= Prisons (Scotland) Act 1989 =

Act of the Parliament of the United Kingdom

Prisons (Scotland) Act 1989 (Note: Section 46(1).)
- Act of Parliament
- Parliament of the United Kingdom
- Long title: An Act to consolidate certain enactments relating to prisons and other institutions for offenders in Scotland and connected matters.
- Citation: 1989 c. 45
- Territorial extent: Scotland (Note: Section 46(3).)

Dates
- Royal assent: 16 November 1989
- Commencement: 16 February 1990 (Note: Section 46(2).)

Other legislation
- Amends: See § Repealed enactments
- Repeals/revokes: See § Repealed enactments
- Amended by: Prisoners and Criminal Proceedings (Scotland) Act 1993; Criminal Justice and Public Order Act 1994; Criminal Procedure (Consequential Provisions) (Scotland) Act 1995; Crime and Disorder Act 1998; Criminal Justice (Scotland) Act 2003; Management of Offenders etc. (Scotland) Act 2005; Management of Offenders (Scotland) Act 2019

Status: Amended

Text of statute as originally enacted

Revised text of statute as amended

Text of the Prisons (Scotland) Act 1989 as in force today (including any amendments) within the United Kingdom, from legislation.gov.uk.

The Prisons (Scotland) Act 1989 (c. 45) is an act of the Parliament of the United Kingdom that consolidated enactments relating to prisons and other institutions for offenders in Scotland.

== Provisions ==
=== Repealed enactments ===
Section 45(2) of the act repealed 12 enactments, listed in schedule 3 to the act.

Enactments repealed by section 45(2)
| Citation | Short title | Extent of repeal |
|---|---|---|
| 1 Edw. 8 & 1 Geo. 6. c. 37 | Children and Young Persons (Scotland) Act 1937 | In section 62(b), the words "subsection (2) of". |
| 15 & 16 Geo. 6 & 1 Eliz. 2. c. 61 | Prisons (Scotland) Act 1952 | The whole act. |
| 9 & 10 Eliz. 2. c. 39 | Criminal Justice Act 1961 | Section 30(4). |
| 1963 c. 39 | Criminal Justice (Scotland) Act 1963 | Section 10. |
| 1963 c. 39 | Criminal Justice (Scotland) Act 1963 | Section 12. |
| 1963 c. 39 | Criminal Justice (Scotland) Act 1963 | Section 14. |
| 1963 c. 39 | Criminal Justice (Scotland) Act 1963 | Section 50. |
| 1963 c. 39 | Criminal Justice (Scotland) Act 1963 | Section 51. |
| 1963 c. 39 | Criminal Justice (Scotland) Act 1963 | Section 54. |
| 1963 c. 39 | Criminal Justice (Scotland) Act 1963 | In Schedule 1, paragraphs 1 to 3 and, in paragraph 14, the words "Part I of this Schedule or". |
| 1963 c. 39 | Criminal Justice (Scotland) Act 1963 | In Schedule 5, the entry relating to the Prisons (Scotland) Act 1952. |
| 1967 c. 80 | Criminal Justice Act 1967 | Sections 59 to 62. |
| 1967 c. 80 | Criminal Justice Act 1967 | Section 64. |
| 1967 c. 80 | Criminal Justice Act 1967 | Section 100(2A). |
| 1967 c. 80 | Criminal Justice Act 1967 | Schedule 2. |
| 1972 c. 71 | Criminal Justice Act 1972 | Section 35. |
| 1975 c. 21 | Criminal Procedure (Scotland) Act 1975 | In section 206, subsections (2) to (7). |
| 1975 c. 21 | Criminal Procedure (Scotland) Act 1975 | Section 206A. |
| 1975 c. 21 | Criminal Procedure (Scotland) Act 1975 | Section 213. |
| 1975 c. 21 | Criminal Procedure (Scotland) Act 1975 | Section 422. |
| 1975 c. 21 | Criminal Procedure (Scotland) Act 1975 | In Schedule 9, paragraphs 16, 31 to 35 and 41. |
| 1977 c. 45 | Criminal Law Act 1977 | In Schedule 12, paragraph 7(4) to (6) of the entry relating to the Criminal Justice Act 1967. |
| 1980 c. 62 | Criminal Justice (Scotland) Act 1980 | Section 44. |
| 1980 c. 62 | Criminal Justice (Scotland) Act 1980 | Section 45(2). |
| 1980 c. 62 | Criminal Justice (Scotland) Act 1980 | Schedule 5. |
| 1980 c. 62 | Criminal Justice (Scotland) Act 1980 | In Schedule 7, paragraphs 1 to 6, 14, 15 and 17 to 20. |
| 1982 c. 48 | Criminal Justice Act 1982 | Section 33(a) and (b). |
| 1982 c. 48 | Criminal Justice Act 1982 | Section 57(2). |
| 1982 c. 48 | Criminal Justice Act 1982 | In Schedule 14, paragraphs 18 to 21. |
| 1985 c. 73 | Law Reform (Miscellaneous Provisions) (Scotland) Act 1985 | Section 42. |
| 1985 c. 73 | Law Reform (Miscellaneous Provisions) (Scotland) Act 1985 | Section 44. |
| 1985 c. 73 | Law Reform (Miscellaneous Provisions) (Scotland) Act 1985 | Section 45. |
| 1988 c. 33 | Criminal Justice Act 1988 | In Schedule 9, paragraph 1. |
| 1988 c. 33 | Criminal Justice Act 1988 | In Schedule 15, paragraph 18. |

== Subsequent developments ==
The act has been amended on several occasions. Following Scottish devolution, the functions of the Secretary of State under the act were transferred to the Scottish Ministers by the Scotland Act 1998 with effect from 1 July 1999. The act has since been amended by the Prisoners and Criminal Proceedings (Scotland) Act 1993, the Criminal Justice and Public Order Act 1994, the Criminal Procedure (Consequential Provisions) (Scotland) Act 1995, the Crime and Disorder Act 1998, the Criminal Justice (Scotland) Act 2003, the Management of Offenders etc. (Scotland) Act 2005 and the Management of Offenders (Scotland) Act 2019, among others.
