= Crime and Disorder Act 1998 =

Act of the Parliament of the United Kingdom

Crime and Disorder Act 1998 (Note: Section 121(1).)
- Act of Parliament
- Parliament of the United Kingdom
- Long title: An Act to make provision for preventing crime and disorder; to create certain racially-aggravated offences; to abolish the rebuttable presumption that a child is doli incapax and to make provision as to the effect of a child’s failure to give evidence at his trial; to abolish the death penalty for treason and piracy; to make changes to the criminal justice system; to make further provision for dealing with offenders; to make further provision with respect to remands and committals for trial and the release and recall of prisoners; to amend Chapter I of Part II of the Crime (Sentences) Act 1997 and to repeal Chapter I of Part III of the Crime and Punishment (Scotland) Act 1997; to make amendments designed to facilitate, or otherwise desirable in connection with, the consolidation of certain enactments; and for connected purposes.
- Citation: 1998 c. 37
- Territorial extent: England and Wales; Scotland; (Note: Section 121(4)–(10).)

Dates
- Royal assent: 31 July 1998
- Commencement: 1 August 1998 and later (Note: Section 121(2)–(3).)
Other legislation
Amends	Treason Act (Ireland) 1537; Crown of Ireland Act 1542; Act of Supremacy (Ireland) 1560; Treason Act 1702; Treason Act (Ireland) 1703; Treason Act 1814; Piracy Act 1837; Children and Young Persons Act 1933; Administration of Justice (Miscellaneous Provisions) Act 1933; Criminal Justice Act (Northern Ireland) 1945; Criminal Procedure (Attendance of Witnesses) Act 1965; Criminal Justice Act 1967; Criminal Appeal Act 1968; Firearms Act 1968; Children and Young Persons Act 1969; Superannuation Act 1972; Criminal Justice Act 1972; Powers of Criminal Courts Act 1973; Rehabilitation of Offenders Act 1974; House of Commons Disqualification Act 1975; Bail Act 1976; Magistrates' Courts Act 1980; Senior Courts Act 1981; Civic Government (Scotland) Act 1982; Criminal Justice Act 1982; Mental Health Act 1983; Mental Health (Scotland) Act 1984; Repatriation of Prisoners Act 1984; Police and Criminal Evidence Act 1984; Prosecution of Offences Act 1985; Housing (Scotland) Act 1987; Criminal Justice Act 1988; Legal Aid Act 1988; Housing (Scotland) Act 1988; Football Spectators Act 1989; Children Act 1989; Prisons (Scotland) Act 1989; Criminal Justice Act 1991; Prisoners and Criminal Proceedings (Scotland) Act 1993; Probation Service Act 1993; Criminal Justice and Public Order Act 1994; Drug Trafficking Act 1994; Proceeds of Crime (Scotland) Act 1995; Criminal Procedure (Scotland) Act 1995; Criminal Law (Consolidation) (Scotland) Act 1995; Criminal Procedure and Investigations Act 1996; Crime (Sentences) Act 1997; Crime and Punishment (Scotland) Act 1997; Police Act 1997; Sex Offenders Act 1997; See § Repealed enactments
Repeals/revokes	Treason Act 1790; Treason Act 1795; Death (Expectant Mothers) Act 1931; See § Repealed enactments
Amended by	Youth Justice and Criminal Evidence Act 1999; Powers of Criminal Courts (Sentencing) Act 2000; Regulation of Investigatory Powers Act 2000; Football (Disorder) Act 2000; Criminal Justice and Police Act 2001; Anti-terrorism, Crime and Security Act 2001; Domestic Violence, Crime and Victims Act 2004; Violent Crime Reduction Act 2006; Criminal Justice and Immigration Act 2008; Statute Law (Repeals) Act 2008; Criminal Justice and Courts Act 2015; Policing and Crime Act 2017; Sentencing (Pre-consolidation Amendments) Act 2020; Sentencing Act 2020; Domestic Abuse Act 2021; Police, Crime, Sentencing and Courts Act 2022
Relates to	Civic Government (Scotland) Act 1982; Anti-social Behaviour Act 2003

Status: Amended

Text of statute as originally enacted

Revised text of statute as amended

The Crime and Disorder Act 1998 (c. 37) is an act of the Parliament of the United Kingdom. The Bill which led to the act was published on 2 December 1997 and received royal assent in July 1998. Its main areas were the introduction of Anti-Social Behaviour Orders, Sex Offender Orders, Parenting Orders, granting local authorities more responsibilities with regard to strategies for reducing crime and disorder, and the introduction of law specific to 'racially aggravated' offences. The act also abolished rebuttable presumption that a child is doli incapax (the presumption that a person between ten and fourteen years of age is incapable of committing an offence) and formally abolished the death penalty for the last civilian offences carrying it, namely treason and piracy.

The bill had also included a reduction in the age of consent for homosexual acts from 18 to 16. However, this provision was removed by the House of Lords; it would eventually be enacted two years later by the Sexual Offences (Amendment) Act 2000.

== Purpose ==
The legislation was intended to reduce the time between an arrest and sentencing of a young person.

== Main provisions ==
=== Anti-Social Behaviour Orders ===
The act introduced a civil remedy called the anti-social behaviour order (or ASBO). These orders are made against people who have engaged in anti-social behaviour, which is defined as "conduct which caused or was likely to cause alarm, harassment, or distress to one or more persons not of the same household as him or herself and where an ASBO is seen as necessary to protect relevant persons from further anti-social acts by the Defendant".

In England and Wales, the orders were made by the magistrates' courts; in Scotland, they are still made by the sheriff courts. The provisions of the 1998 act have since been modified by the Anti-social Behaviour Act 2003; they were abolished in England and Wales in 2014.

=== Sex Offender Orders ===
In England and Wales, a Sex Offender Order was a similar concept to the Anti-Social Behaviour Order with the main difference being that it was specifically aimed at those people in society that are deemed "sex offenders". The act allowed a police officer to approach the magistrates' court and show that they have reasonable cause to believe that there is a need for an order to be made to protect the public from harm. The conditions placed in such an order were those that are needed to prevent harm to the public. The order could be made for a minimum of 5 years unless the court upheld a complaint for the order to be varied or discharged.

A breach of a Sex Offender Order rendered the person to which the order applies liable for imprisonment, on summary conviction, for up to six months, or on conviction on indictment, up to five years and/or a fine.

The act only applied to those people that are defined as a 'sex offender' per Section 3(1) of the act, namely that the person has been convicted of an offence that is subject to notification requirements (as specified in Part I of the Sex Offenders Act 1997); was found not guilty as a result of insanity; or has been cautioned for such an offence (except in Scotland) and at the time admitted it: or has been convicted of a similar offence in any country outside of the UK and the offence would have been deemed a sexual offence under UK law.

Sex offender orders were replaced with sexual offences prevention orders with the Sexual Offences Act 2003, and further replaced in England and Wales with sexual harm prevention orders with the Anti-social Behaviour, Crime and Policing Act 2014.

=== Parenting Orders ===
In England and Wales, a Parenting Order is an order made against the parent(s) of a child which has been given an Anti-Social Behaviour Order, has been convicted of an offence, or the parent has been convicted of an offence under section 443 or 444 of the Education Act 1996 (i.e. failure to prevent truancy). Its aim is that parents must adhere to the conditions to stop their child from behaving similarly; failure to do so will lead to their conviction. The order can be made for a period not exceeding 12 months. There are restrictions on orders being made that interfere with the parents' or child's religious beliefs or that interfere with the times which the parent normally attends work or an educational institution. If the parenting order is breached, the parent(s) could be liable to a fine, not exceeding level 3 on the standard scale.

=== Racially or religiously aggravated offences ===
In England and Wales, Sections 28 to 32 of the act create separate offences for crimes that were aggravated by the victim's race or religion or presumed race or religion. They did not originally apply to crimes that are aggravated by the offender's perception of the victim's membership of a religion but it was amended by section 39 of the Anti-terrorism, Crime and Security Act 2001.

When it came into force, section 145 of the Crime and Policing Act 2026 amended these beyond racial and religious hostility to also cover hostility related to disability, sex, sexual orientation and transgender identity.

==== Racially or religiously aggravated assaults ====
===== Serious violent offences =====
Section 29(1)(a) creates the distinct offence of racially or religiously aggravated wounding or infliction of bodily harm. A person is guilty of this offence if he commits an offence under section 20 of the Offences Against the Person Act 1861 (see grievous bodily harm) which is racially or religiously aggravated within the meaning of section 28.

Section 29(1)(b) creates the distinct offence of racially or religiously aggravated assault occasioning actual bodily harm. A person is guilty of this offence if they commit an offence under section 47 of the Offences against the Person Act 1861 (see assault occasioning actual bodily harm) which is racially or religiously aggravated within the meaning of section 28.

A person guilty of either of these offences is liable on conviction on indictment to imprisonment for a term not exceeding seven years, or to a fine, or to both, or on summary conviction to imprisonment for a term not exceeding six months, or to a fine not exceeding the statutory maximum, or to both (s.29(2)).

===== Common assault =====
Section 29(1)(c) creates the distinct offence of racially or religiously aggravated common assault. A person is guilty of this offence if he commits a common assault which is racially or religiously aggravated within the meaning of section 28.

This offence is triable either way.

A person guilty of this offence is liable on conviction on indictment to imprisonment for a term not exceeding two years, or to a fine, or to both, or on summary conviction to imprisonment for a term not exceeding six months, or to a fine not exceeding the statutory maximum, or to both (s.29(3)).

===== Racially or religiously aggravated criminal damage =====
Section 30(1) creates the distinct offence of racially or religiously aggravated criminal damage. A person is guilty of this offence if he commits an offence under section 1(1) of the Criminal Damage Act 1971 (see also criminal damage) which is racially or religiously aggravated within the meaning of section 28.

A person guilty of this offence is liable on conviction on indictment to imprisonment for a term not exceeding fourteen years, or to a fine, or to both, or on summary conviction to imprisonment for a term not exceeding six months, or to a fine not exceeding the statutory maximum, or to both (s.30(2)).

==== Racially or religiously aggravated public order offences ====
===== Fear or provocation of violence and intentional harassment, alarm or distress =====
Section 31(1)(a) creates the distinct offence of racially or religiously aggravated fear or provocation of violence. A person is guilty of this offence if he commits an offence under section 4 of the Public Order Act 1986 (see fear or provocation of violence) which is racially or religiously aggravated within the meaning of section 28.

Section 31(1)(b) creates the distinct offence of racially or religiously aggravated intentional harassment, alarm or distress. A person is guilty of this offence if he commits an offence under section 4A of the Public Order Act 1986 (see intentional harassment, alarm or distress) which is racially or religiously aggravated within the meaning of section 28.

A person guilty of either of these offences is liable on conviction on indictment to imprisonment for a term not exceeding two years, or to a fine, or to both, or on summary conviction to imprisonment for a term not exceeding six months, or to a fine not exceeding the statutory maximum, or to both (s.31(4)).

===== Harassment, alarm or distress =====
Section 31(1)(c) creates the distinct offence of racially or religiously aggravated harassment, alarm or distress. A person is guilty of this offence if he commits an offence under section 5 of the Public Order Act 1986 (see harassment, alarm or distress) which is racially or religiously aggravated within the meaning of section 28.

A person guilty of this offence is liable on summary conviction to imprisonment for a term not exceeding six months, or to a fine not exceeding level 4 on the standard scale (s.29(3)).

===== Arrest =====
Sections 31(2) and (3) formerly provided a statutory power of arrest for offences under section 31(1). They were repealed by section 174 of, and Part 2 of Schedule 17 to, the Serious Organised Crime and Police Act 2005.

==== Racially or religiously aggravated harassment etc. ====
===== Harassment =====
A person is guilty of an offence under section 32(1)(a) if he commits an offence under section 2 of the Protection from Harassment Act 1997 which is racially or religiously aggravated within the meaning of section 28.

A person guilty of this offence is liable on conviction on indictment to imprisonment for a term not exceeding two years, or to a fine, or to both, or on summary conviction to imprisonment for a term not exceeding six months, or to a fine not exceeding the statutory maximum, or to both (s.32(3)).

===== Putting people in fear of violence =====
A person is guilty of an offence under section 32(1)(b) if he commits an offence under section 4 of the Protection from Harassment Act 1997 which is racially or religiously aggravated within the meaning of section 28.

A person guilty of this offence is liable on conviction on indictment to imprisonment for a term not exceeding seven years, or to a fine, or to both, or on summary conviction to imprisonment for a term not exceeding six months, or to a fine not exceeding the statutory maximum, or to both (s.32(4)).

In Scotland, Section 33 amended the Criminal Law (Consolidation) (Scotland) Act 1995 by inserting a new section 50A. This creates the offence of racially aggravated harassment.

=== Local authority responsibilities ===
Each Local Authority in England and Wales was given the responsibility to formulate and implement a strategy to reduce crime and disorder in their area. The act also requires the local authority to work with every police authority, probation authority, Strategic health authority, social landlords, the voluntary sector, and local residents and businesses. Known as Crime and Disorder Reduction Partnerships (CDRPs) in England, and Community Safety Partnerships (CSPs) in Wales, the Home Office may require any Partnership to supply details of their community safety arrangements.

=== Other provisions ===
Section 34 of the act abolished the rebuttable presumption that a child (defined as a person under fourteen but over the age of ten) is incapable of committing an offence (doli incapax).

Section 36 of the act abolished the death penalty for all offences of treason and for the offence of piracy with violence (under the Piracy Act 1837), replacing it with a maximum sentence of life imprisonment (with effect from 30 September 1998). These were the last offences carrying the death penalty, which had not been carried out for any offence since its abolition for murder in 1965. The United Kingdom is now prohibited by treaty (Protocol 6 and Protocol 13 to the European Convention on Human Rights) from reintroducing it for any offence.

The act established the Youth Justice Board.

=== Repealed enactments ===
Section 120(2) of the act repealed 28 enactments, listed in schedule 10 to the act.

Citation	Short title	Extent of repeal
30 Geo. 3. c. 48	Treason Act 1790	The whole act.
36 Geo. 3. c. 7	Treason Act 1795	The whole act.
36 Geo. 3. c. 31	Treason by Women Act (Ireland) 1796	The whole act.
57 Geo. 3. c. 6	Treason Act 1817	The whole act.
11 & 12 Vict. c. 12	Treason Felony Act 1848	Section 2.
21 & 22 Geo. 5. c. 24	Sentence of Death (Expectant Mothers) Act 1931	The whole act.
23 Geo. 5. c. 12	Children and Young Persons Act 1933	In section 47(2), the words from the beginning to "court; and".
23 Geo. 5. c. 12	Children and Young Persons Act 1933	In Schedule 2, in paragraph 15(a), the word "shall", in the second place where it occurs, and, in paragraph 17, the words "or, if a metropolitan stipendiary magistrate, may sit alone".
1945 c. 15 (N.I.)	Criminal Justice Act (Northern Ireland) 1945	Sections 32 and 33.
1967 c. 80	Criminal Justice Act 1967	In section 56, subsections (3), (6) and (13).
1967 c. 80	Criminal Justice Act 1967	Section 67(5)(c).
1968 c. 19	Criminal Appeal Act 1968	In section 10(2), the words "(other than a supervision order within the meaning of that Part)".
1969 c. 54	Children and Young Persons Act 1969	Section 12D.
1969 c. 54	Children and Young Persons Act 1969	Section 13(2).
1969 c. 54	Children and Young Persons Act 1969	In section 16, subsection (10) and, in subsection (11), the words "seventeen or".
1969 c. 54	Children and Young Persons Act 1969	Section 23(14)(a).
1969 c. 54	Children and Young Persons Act 1969	In section 34, in subsection (1), paragraph (a) and, in paragraph (c), the words "or are".
1969 c. 54	Children and Young Persons Act 1969	Section 69(5).
1969 c. 54	Children and Young Persons Act 1969	In Schedule 6, the entries relating to sections 55, 56(1) and 59(1) of the Children and Young Persons Act 1933.
1972 c. 71	Criminal Justice Act 1972	Section 49.
1973 c. 62	Powers of Criminal Courts Act 1973	In section 1, in subsections (8)(b) and (8A) the words "37 or".
1973 c. 62	Powers of Criminal Courts Act 1973	Section 1B(10).
1973 c. 62	Powers of Criminal Courts Act 1973	In section 1C(1), paragraph (b) and the word "and" immediately preceding it.
1973 c. 62	Powers of Criminal Courts Act 1973	In section 2(1), the words "by a probation officer" and the words from "For the purposes" to "available evidence".
1973 c. 62	Powers of Criminal Courts Act 1973	Section 11.
1973 c. 62	Powers of Criminal Courts Act 1973	Section 14(8).
1973 c. 62	Powers of Criminal Courts Act 1973	In section 31, in subsection (3A), the words "Subject to subsections (3B) and (3C) below,", subsections (3B) and (3C), in subsection (4), the words "4 or" and, in subsection (6), the words "about committal by a magistrates' court to the Crown Court".
1973 c. 62	Powers of Criminal Courts Act 1973	Section 32(5).
1973 c. 62	Powers of Criminal Courts Act 1973	Section 42(2).
1973 c. 62	Powers of Criminal Courts Act 1973	In Schedule 1A, paragraph 6(7).
1973 c. 62	Powers of Criminal Courts Act 1973	In Schedule 5, paragraph 35.
1976 c. 63	Bail Act 1976	In section 3(5), the words "If it appears that he is unlikely to remain in Great Britain until the time appointed for him to surrender to custody".
1980 c. 43	Magistrates' Courts Act 1980	Section 37.
1980 c. 43	Magistrates' Courts Act 1980	In sections 38(2) and 38A(2), the words ", in accordance with section 56 of the Criminal Justice Act 1967,".
1980 c. 43	Magistrates' Courts Act 1980	In section 108(2), the words "a probation order or".
1980 c. 43	Magistrates' Courts Act 1980	In section 125(4)(c), the word "and" at the end of sub-paragraph (ii).
1980 c. 43	Magistrates' Courts Act 1980	In section 126, the word "and" at the end of paragraph (c).
1980 c. 43	Magistrates' Courts Act 1980	In Schedule 7, paragraph 120(b).
1982 c. 48	Criminal Justice Act 1982	Section 1A(4A).
1982 c. 48	Criminal Justice Act 1982	Section 1B.
1982 c. 48	Criminal Justice Act 1982	In section 1C(2), the words "but if he is under 18 at the time of the direction, only for a temporary purpose".
1982 c. 48	Criminal Justice Act 1982	In section 3(1)(a), the words "under section 1A above".
1982 c. 48	Criminal Justice Act 1982	Section 18(7).
1982 c. 48	Criminal Justice Act 1982	In section 19, in subsection (3)(a), the words "revoke it and" and, in subsection (5), the words "revoke the attendance centre order and".
1982 c. 48	Criminal Justice Act 1982	Section 66(3).
1982 c. 48	Criminal Justice Act 1982	In Schedule 14, paragraph 28.
1987 c. 42	Family Law Reform Act 1987	Section 8(1).
1987 c. 42	Family Law Reform Act 1987	In Schedule 2, paragraph 26.
1988 c. 33	Criminal Justice Act 1988	Section 69(2).
1988 c. 33	Criminal Justice Act 1988	In Schedule 15, paragraph 40.
1989 c. 45	Prisons (Scotland) Act 1989	In section 39(7), the words from "and the foregoing" to the end.
1991 c. 53	Criminal Justice Act 1991	In section 6(4), the word "and" immediately following paragraph (e).
1991 c. 53	Criminal Justice Act 1991	In section 31(1), in the definition of "custodial sentence", in paragraph (b), the words "or a secure training order under section 1 of the Criminal Justice and Public Order Act 1994".
1991 c. 53	Criminal Justice Act 1991	Section 33(4).
1991 c. 53	Criminal Justice Act 1991	In section 37, in subsection (1), the words "any suspension under section 38(2) below or, as the case may be," and, in subsection (4), the words "(which shall include on his release conditions as to his supervision by a probation officer)".
1991 c. 53	Criminal Justice Act 1991	Section 38.
1991 c. 53	Criminal Justice Act 1991	In section 45(4), the words "any suspension under section 38(2) below; or".
1991 c. 53	Criminal Justice Act 1991	In section 61(1), paragraph (b) and the word "or" immediately preceding that paragraph.
1991 c. 53	Criminal Justice Act 1991	Section 62.
1991 c. 53	Criminal Justice Act 1991	In Schedule 2, in paragraphs 3(1)(d) and 4(1)(d), the words "revoke the order and" and, in paragraph 17(1), the words from "and the court" to the end.
1991 c. 53	Criminal Justice Act 1991	In Schedule 11, paragraphs 10, 11 and 14.
1991 c. 53	Criminal Justice Act 1991	In Schedule 12, paragraph 17(3).
1993 c. 9	Prisoners and Criminal Proceedings (Scotland) Act 1993	Section 11(3)(b) and (4).
1993 c. 9	Prisoners and Criminal Proceedings (Scotland) Act 1993	Section 14(2) and (3).
1993 c. 9	Prisoners and Criminal Proceedings (Scotland) Act 1993	Section 16(7)(b).
1993 c. 9	Prisoners and Criminal Proceedings (Scotland) Act 1993	In paragraph 6B(1) of Schedule 6, the word "and" after head (a).
1993 c. 47	Probation Service Act 1993	Section 17(5A).
1994 c. 33	Criminal Justice and Public Order Act 1994	Sections 1 to 4.
1994 c. 33	Criminal Justice and Public Order Act 1994	Section 20.
1994 c. 33	Criminal Justice and Public Order Act 1994	In section 35, in subsection (1), the words "who has attained the age of fourteen years" and subsection (6).
1994 c. 33	Criminal Justice and Public Order Act 1994	Section 130(4).
1994 c. 33	Criminal Justice and Public Order Act 1994	In Schedule 10, paragraph 42.
1994 c. 37	Drug Trafficking Act 1994	Section 2(7)(a).
1995 c. 46	Criminal Procedure (Scotland) Act 1995	Section 118(4A)(c)(iii).
1995 c. 46	Criminal Procedure (Scotland) Act 1995	In section 175(5C), the words "paragraph (a) of".
1995 c. 46	Criminal Procedure (Scotland) Act 1995	In section 209(1), the words "not less than twelve months but".
1997 c. 43	Crime (Sentences) Act 1997	Section 1.
1997 c. 43	Crime (Sentences) Act 1997	Section 8.
1997 c. 43	Crime (Sentences) Act 1997	Sections 10 to 27.
1997 c. 43	Crime (Sentences) Act 1997	In section 31(2), the words "(which shall include on his release conditions as to his supervision by a probation officer)".
1997 c. 43	Crime (Sentences) Act 1997	In section 35, in subsection (5), paragraph (c) and the word "and" at the end of paragraph (d), and in subsection (8), in paragraph (a), the words "to revoke the order and deal with an offender for the offence in respect of which the order was made" and the word "and" at the end of that paragraph.
1997 c. 43	Crime (Sentences) Act 1997	Section 43(4).
1997 c. 43	Crime (Sentences) Act 1997	Section 54(2).
1997 c. 43	Crime (Sentences) Act 1997	In Schedule 1, in paragraph 9(1), paragraph (a) and, in paragraph (b), the words "to that and", paragraph 9(5), paragraph 10(4), in paragraph 11(6), the words "or Part III of the 1997 Act", in paragraph 12(5), in the Table, the entry relating to the expression "prison rules" and, in paragraph 13(5), in the Table, the entry relating to the expression "prison rules".
1997 c. 43	Crime (Sentences) Act 1997	In Schedule 2, paragraphs 4 and 8.
1997 c. 43	Crime (Sentences) Act 1997	In Schedule 4, paragraph 6(1)(b), paragraphs 9 and 11 and paragraph 12(4).
1997 c. 43	Crime (Sentences) Act 1997	In Schedule 5, paragraphs 1 to 4, paragraph 5(2), paragraph 6, paragraph 8, paragraph 9(1), paragraph 10(1), in paragraph 11, sub-paragraph (1), in sub-paragraph (2)(c), the words "or Part III of the 1997 Act" and, in sub-paragraph (3), the words from the beginning to "1995; and", and in paragraph 12, sub-paragraph (1) and, in sub-paragraph (2)(c), the words "or Part III of the 1997 Act".
1997 c. 48	Crime and Punishment (Scotland) Act 1997	Section 4.
1997 c. 48	Crime and Punishment (Scotland) Act 1997	Chapter I of Part III.
1997 c. 48	Crime and Punishment (Scotland) Act 1997	In Schedule 1, paragraph 1, paragraph 9(7), paragraph 10(2)(a), paragraph 13(3), in paragraph 14, sub-paragraphs (2)(a), (3)(e), (4) to (7), (9), (10)(a), (11)(b), (12), (13) to (15) and (17), and paragraph 21(3).
1997 c. 48	Crime and Punishment (Scotland) Act 1997	Schedule 2.
1997 c. 48	Crime and Punishment (Scotland) Act 1997	In Schedule 3, in the entry relating to the Prisons (Scotland) Act 1989, the words "In section 39, subsection (7)", in the entry relating to the Prisoners and Criminal Proceedings (Scotland) Act 1993, the words relating to sections 1, 3(2), 5, 6(1), 7, 9, 12(3), 16, 17(1), 20, 24, 27(2), (3), (5) and (6) and Schedule 1, in the words relating to section 14, the words "and, in subsection (4), the words "short-term"", in the words relating to section 27(1), the words "the definitions of "short term prisoner" and "long-term prisoner" and" and "and the words from "but" to the end" and, in the entry relating to the Criminal Procedure (Scotland) Act 1995, the words relating to section 44.
1997 c. 50	Police Act 1997	In section 94(4), the word "and" immediately preceding paragraph (c).

== Case law ==
On 28 February 2007, the House of Lords ruled that use of the expletive "bloody foreigner" amounted to racial abuse under the act, and held that the legal definition of "racial group" went beyond colour, race or ethnic origin to include nationality, citizenship and national origin – even if they were not specified in the words used by the offender. Baroness Hale stated that such conduct was not only deeply hurtful, damaging and disrespectful to the victim, but also to the community as a whole "by denying acceptance to members of certain groups not for their own sake but for the sake of something they can do nothing about".

== See also ==
- Capital punishment in the United Kingdom
- High treason in the United Kingdom
- Hate crime
