= Bail Act 1976 =

Act of the Parliament of the United Kingdom

Bail Act 1976 (Note: Section 13(1).)
- Act of Parliament
- Parliament of the United Kingdom
- Long title: An Act to make provision in relation to bail in or in connection with criminal proceedings in England and Wales, to make it an offence to agree to indemnify sureties in criminal proceedings, to make provision for legal aid limited to questions of bail in certain cases and for legal aid for persons kept in custody for inquiries or reports, to extend the powers of coroners to grant bail and for connected purposes.
- Citation: 1976 c. 63
- Territorial extent: England and Wales (Note: Section 13(4).)

Dates
- Royal assent: 15 November 1976
- Commencement: 15 November 1976 (section 13) (Note: Section 13 came into force on the passing of the Act.); 17 April 1978 (rest of act) (Note: Section 13(2). The Bail Act 1976 (Commencement) Order 1978 (SI 1978/132).)

Other legislation
- Amends: See § Repealed enactments
- Repeals/revokes: See § Repealed enactments
- Amended by: Criminal Procedure (Scotland) Act 1975; Criminal Law Act 1977; Interpretation Act 1978; Magistrates' Courts Act 1980; Animal Health Act 1981; Senior Courts Act 1981; Criminal Justice Act 1982; Representation of the People Act 1983; Mental Health Act 1983; Fines and Penalties (Northern Ireland) Order 1984; Prosecution of Offences Act 1985; Criminal Justice Act 1988; Legal Aid Act 1988; Statute Law (Repeals) Act 1989; Criminal Procedure (Insanity and Unfitness to Plead) Act 1991; Criminal Justice Act 1991; Criminal Justice and Public Order Act 1994; Crime and Disorder Act 1998; Powers of Criminal Courts (Sentencing) Act 2000; Carers and Disabled Children Act 2000; Criminal Justice and Court Services Act 2000; Criminal Justice and Police Act 2001; Extradition Act 2003; Courts Act 2003; Criminal Justice Act 2003; Courts Act 2003 (Consequential Provisions) Order 2005; Police and Justice Act 2006; Armed Forces Act 2006; Legal Services Act 2007; Criminal Justice and Immigration Act 2008; Coroners and Justice Act 2009; Legal Aid, Sentencing and Punishment of Offenders Act 2012; Police and Fire Reform (Scotland) Act 2012 (Consequential Provisions and Modifications) Order 2013; Courts and Tribunals (Judiciary and Functions of Staff) Act 2018; Counter-Terrorism and Border Security Act 2019; Sentencing Act 2020; Judicial Review and Courts Act 2022 (Magistrates’ Court Sentencing Powers) (Revocation and Amendment) Regulations 2023; Sentencing Act 2026; Crime and Policing Act 2026

Status: Amended

Text of statute as originally enacted

Revised text of statute as amended

Text of the Bail Act 1976 as in force today (including any amendments) within the United Kingdom, from legislation.gov.uk.

The Bail Act 1976 (c. 63) is an act of the Parliament of the United Kingdom that made provision in relation to bail in or in connection with criminal proceedings in England and Wales.

== Provisions ==
=== Repealed enactments ===
Section 12(2) of the act repealed 13 enactments, listed in schedule 3 to the act.

Enactments repealed by section 12(2)
Citation	Short title	Extent of repeal
31 Chas. 2. c. 2	Habeas Corpus Act 1679	In section 5, the words "by recognizance".
32 Geo. 3. c. 56	Servants' Characters Act 1792	In section 6, the words "and enter into recognizance".
2 & 3 Vict. c. 47	Metropolitan Police Act 1839	In section 69, the words from "to take bail" to the end.
2 & 3 Vict. c. 71	Metropolitan Police Courts Act 1839	Section 36.
52 & 53 Vict. c. 63	Interpretation Act 1889	In section 27, the words from "and shall include" to the end.
11 & 12 Geo. 6. c. 58	Criminal Justice Act 1948	In section 37, subsections (2) and (3) and, in subsection (4), paragraph (a).
15 & 16 Geo. 6 & 1 Eliz. 2. c. 55	Magistrates' Courts Act 1952	In section 16(2), the words "to enter into a recognizance or".
15 & 16 Geo. 6 & 1 Eliz. 2. c. 55	Magistrates' Courts Act 1952	In section 26, subsection (4).
15 & 16 Geo. 6 & 1 Eliz. 2. c. 55	Magistrates' Courts Act 1952	Section 38(3).
15 & 16 Geo. 6 & 1 Eliz. 2. c. 55	Magistrates' Courts Act 1952	Section 97.
8 & 9 Eliz. 2. c. 65	Administration of Justice Act 1960	In section 4(3), the words "the applicant or".
1965 c. 45	Backing of Warrants (Republic of Ireland) Act 1965	In section 5(4) the words "in breach of a recognizance taken from him under this section" and "without prejudice to the enforcement of the recognizance".
1967 c. 80	Criminal Justice Act 1967	Sections 18 and 21.
1967 c. 80	Criminal Justice Act 1967	In section 22(3), the reference to subsection (3) of section 37 of the Criminal Justice Act 1948.
1967 c. 80	Criminal Justice Act 1967	Section 23.
1969 c. 54	Children and Young Persons Act 1969	In section 29, subsection (6).
1971 c. 23	Courts Act 1971	In section 13, subsection (3).
1972 c. 71	Criminal Justice Act 1972	Section 43.
