= Intentional harassment, alarm or distress =

Statutory offence in England and Wales

Intentional harassment, alarm or distress is a statutory offence in England and Wales. It is an aggravated form of the offence of harassment, alarm or distress under section 5 of the Public Order Act 1986.

== The offence ==
The offence is created by section 4A of the Public Order Act 1986, which was inserted by section 154 of the Criminal Justice and Public Order Act 1994:

:(1) A person is guilty of an offence if, with intent to cause a person harassment, alarm or distress, he:

(a) uses threatening, abusive or insulting words or behaviour, or disorderly behaviour, or
(b) displays any writing, sign or other visible representation which is threatening, abusive or insulting

thereby causing that or another person harassment, alarm or distress.
(2) An offence under this section may be committed in a public or a private place, except that no offence is committed where the words or behaviour are used, or the writing, sign or other visible representation is displayed, by a person inside a dwelling and the person who is harassed, alarmed or distressed is also inside that or another dwelling.
(3) It is a defence for the accused to prove:

(a) that he was inside a dwelling and had no reason to believe that the words or behaviour used, or the writing, sign or other visible representation displayed, would be heard or seen by a person outside that or any other dwelling, or
(b) that his conduct was reasonable.

== Mode of trial and sentence ==
This is a summary offence. It is punishable with imprisonment for a term not exceeding six months, or a fine not exceeding level 5 on the standard scale, or both.

== Arrest ==
Section 4A(4) of the 1986 Act formerly provided that a constable (or designated person) could arrest without warrant anyone he reasonably suspected was committing this offence. This was repealed by section 174 of, and Part 2 of Schedule 17 to, the Serious Organised Crime and Police Act 2005.

== Racially or religiously aggravated offence ==
Section 31(1)(b) of the Crime and Disorder Act 1998 (c.37) creates the distinct offence of racially or religiously aggravated intentional harassment, alarm or distress.
