= Section 60 =

Section 60 may refer to:

- The section of Arlington National Cemetery for veterans of the wars in Afghanistan and Iraq
- Section 60: Arlington National Cemetery, a documentary by Jon Alpert about the families of veterans buried in Section 60
- The section relating to 'stop and search' powers of the British police in the Criminal Justice and Public Order Act 1994
- Section 60 of the Indian Penal Code, defining the application of rigorous imprisonment and simple imprisonment
