= Criminal Justice and Public Order Act 1994 =

Act of the Parliament of the United Kingdom

Criminal Justice and Public Order Act 1994 (Note: Section 172(1).)
- Act of Parliament
- Parliament of the United Kingdom
- Long title: An Act to make further provision in relation to criminal justice (including employment in the prison service); to amend or extend the criminal law and powers for preventing crime and enforcing that law; to amend the Video Recordings Act 1984; and for purposes connected with those purposes.
- Citation: 1994 c. 33
- Introduced by: Michael Howard (Commons)
- Territorial extent: England and Wales; Scotland (in part); Northern Ireland (in part); (Note: Section 172(7)–(16).)

Dates
- Royal assent: 3 November 1994
- Commencement: various (Note: Section 172(2)–(6).)
Other legislation
Amends	List: Habeas Corpus Act 1679; Game Act 1831; Game (Scotland) Act 1832; Indictable Offences Act 1848; Criminal Procedure Act 1853; Territorial Waters Jurisdiction Act 1878; Explosive Substances Act 1883; Criminal Evidence Act 1898; Criminal Evidence Act (Northern Ireland) 1923; Criminal Justice Act 1925; Children and Young Persons Act 1933; Administration of Justice (Miscellaneous Provisions) Act 1933; Criminal Justice Act 1948; Prison Act 1952; Army Act 1955; Air Force Act 1955; Sexual Offences Act 1956; Geneva Conventions Act 1957; Naval Discipline Act 1957; Obscene Publications Act 1959; Game Laws (Amendment) Act 1960; Caravan Sites and Control of Development Act 1960; Administration of Justice Act 1960; Criminal Justice Act 1961; Children and Young Persons Act 1963; Police Act 1964; Backing of Warrants (Republic of Ireland) Act 1965; Criminal Procedure (Attendance of Witnesses) Act 1965; Sexual Offences Act 1967; Police (Scotland) Act 1967; Criminal Justice Act 1967; Sea Fisheries (Shellfish) Act 1967; Criminal Appeal Act 1968; Firearms Act 1968; Caravan Sites Act 1968; Theft Act 1968; Criminal Justice (Miscellaneous Provisions) Act (Northern Ireland) 1968; Children and Young Persons Act 1969; Police Act 1969; Police Act (Northern Ireland) 1970; Misuse of Drugs Act 1971; Criminal Justice Act 1972; Powers of Criminal Courts Act 1973; Juries Act 1974; Rehabilitation of Offenders Act 1974; Juries (Northern Ireland) Order 1974; Criminal Procedure (Scotland) Act 1975; Bail Act 1976; Sexual Offences (Amendment) Act 1976; Criminal Law Act 1977; Interpretation Act 1978; Protection of Children Act 1978; Protection of Children (Northern Ireland) Order 1978; Customs and Excise Management Act 1979; Reserve Forces Act 1980; Law Reform (Miscellaneous Provisions) (Scotland) Act 1980; Magistrates' Courts Act 1980; Water (Scotland) Act 1980; Criminal Appeal (Northern Ireland) Act 1980; Imprisonment (Temporary Provisions) Act 1980; Criminal Justice (Scotland) Act 1980; Local Government, Planning and Land Act 1980; Criminal Attempts Act 1981; Contempt of Court Act 1981; Senior Courts Act 1981; Firearms (Northern Ireland) Order 1981; Civic Government (Scotland) Act 1982; Criminal Justice Act 1982; Homosexual Offences (Northern Ireland) Order 1982; Mental Health Act 1983; Telecommunications Act 1984; County Courts Act 1984; Data Protection Act 1984; Video Recordings Act 1984; Police and Criminal Evidence Act 1984; Fines and Penalties (Northern Ireland) Order 1984; Prosecution of Offences Act 1985; Agricultural Holdings Act 1986; Public Order Act 1986; Criminal Justice Act 1987; Criminal Justice (Scotland) Act 1987; Criminal Justice Act 1988; Legal Aid Act 1988; Coroners Act 1988; Copyright, Designs and Patents Act 1988; Criminal Evidence (Northern Ireland) Order 1988; Road Traffic Offenders Act 1988; Criminal Justice (Evidence, etc.) (Northern Ireland) Order 1988; Prevention of Terrorism (Temporary Provisions) Act 1989; Extradition Act 1989; Children Act 1989; Prisons (Scotland) Act 1989; Police and Criminal Evidence (Northern Ireland) Order 1989; Criminal Justice (International Co-operation) Act 1990; Computer Misuse Act 1990; Human Fertilisation and Embryology Act 1990; Broadcasting Act 1990; War Crimes Act 1991; Northern Ireland (Emergency Provisions) Act 1991; Criminal Justice Act 1991; Sexual Offences (Amendment) Act 1992; Parole Board (Transfer of Functions) Order 1992; Prisoners and Criminal Proceedings (Scotland) Act 1993; Criminal Justice Act 1993; Video Recordings Act 1993; Probation Service Act 1993
Amended by	List: Drug Trafficking Act 1994; Environment Act 1995; Criminal Procedure (Consequential Provisions) (Scotland) Act 1995; Police Act 1996; Employment Rights Act 1996; Criminal Procedure and Investigations Act 1996; Juries (Northern Ireland) Order 1996; Employment Rights (Northern Ireland) Order 1996; Criminal Evidence (Amendment) Act 1997; Knives Act 1997; Data Protection Act 1998; Crime and Disorder Act 1998; Registration of Political Parties Act 1998; Football (Offences and Disorder) Act 1999; Youth Justice and Criminal Evidence Act 1999; Scotland Act 1998 (Consequential Modifications) (No. 2) Order 1999; Powers of Criminal Courts (Sentencing) Act 2000; Terrorism Act 2000; Football (Disorder) Act 2000; Countryside and Rights of Way Act 2000; Political Parties, Elections and Referendums Act 2000; Criminal Justice and Court Services Act 2000; Sexual Offences (Amendment) Act 2000; Anti-terrorism, Crime and Security Act 2001; Proceeds of Crime Act 2002; Police Reform Act 2002; Licensing Act 2003; Railways and Transport Safety Act 2003; Crime (International Co-operation) Act 2003; Anti-social Behaviour Act 2003; Crime (International Co-operation) Act 2003; Courts Act 2003; Extradition Act 2003; Sexual Offences Act 2003; Criminal Justice Act 2003; Land Reform (Scotland) Act 2003; Criminal Justice (Scotland) Act 2003; Agricultural Holdings (Scotland) Act 2003; British Transport Police (Transitional and Consequential Provisions) Order 2004; Firearms (Northern Ireland) Order 2004; Constitutional Reform Act 2005; Serious Organised Crime and Police Act 2005; Regulatory Reform (Prison Officers) (Industrial Action) Order 2005; Mental Health (Care and Treatment) (Scotland) Act 2003 (Modification of Enactments) Order 2005; Commons Act 2006; Violent Crime Reduction Act 2006; Armed Forces Act 2006; Finance Act 2007; Offender Management Act 2007; Serious Crime Act 2007; Legal Services Act 2007; Secretary of State for Justice Order 2007; Police and Criminal Evidence (Amendment) (Northern Ireland) Order 2007; Criminal Justice and Immigration Act 2008; Housing and Regeneration Act 2008; Counter-Terrorism Act 2008; Sexual Offences (Northern Ireland Consequential Amendments) Order 2008; Coroners and Justice Act 2009; Criminal Justice and Licensing (Scotland) Act 2010; Northern Ireland Act 1998 (Devolution of Policing and Justice Functions) Order 2010; Housing and Regeneration Act 2008 (Consequential Provisions) Order 2010Protection of Freedoms Act 2012; Legal Aid, Sentencing and Punishment of Offenders Act 2012; Police and Fire Reform (Scotland) Act 2012; Crime and Courts Act 2013; Police and Fire Reform (Scotland) Act 2012 (Consequential Provisions and Modifications) Order 2013; Criminal Justice and Courts Act 2015; Deregulation Act 2015; Public Services Reform (Inspection and Monitoring of Prisons) (Scotland) Order 2015; Criminal Justice (Scotland) Act 2016; Policing and Crime Act 2017; Merchant Shipping (Homosexual Conduct) Act 2017; Criminal Justice (Scotland) Act 2016 (Consequential Provisions) Order 2018; Policing and Crime Act 2017 (Consequential Amendments) Regulations 2018; Criminal Justice (Amendment etc.) (EU Exit) Regulations 2019; Sentencing Act 2020; Counter-Terrorism and Sentencing Act 2021; Domestic Abuse Act 2021; Health and Care Act 2022; Police, Crime, Sentencing and Courts Act 2022; Coronavirus (Recovery and Reform) (Scotland) Act 2022; Energy Act 2023; Historic Environment (Wales) Act 2023; Employment Rights Act 2025

Status: Amended

Text of statute as originally enacted

Text of the Criminal Justice and Public Order Act 1994 as in force today (including any amendments) within the United Kingdom, from legislation.gov.uk.

The Criminal Justice and Public Order Act 1994 (c. 33) is an act of the Parliament of the United Kingdom. It introduced a number of changes to the law, most notably in the restriction and reduction of existing rights, clamping down on unlicensed raves, and greater penalties for certain "anti-social" behaviours. The bill was introduced by Michael Howard, home secretary of Prime Minister John Major's Conservative government, and attracted widespread opposition.

== Background ==
A primary motivation for the act was to curb illegal raves and free parties, especially the traveller festival circuit, which was steadily growing in the early 1990s, culminating in the 1992 Castlemorton Common Festival. Following debates in the House of Commons in its aftermath, Prime Minister John Major alluded to a future clampdown with then Home Secretary Ken Clarke at that year's Conservative Party conference. At the 1993 conference, Michael Howard, who had become Home Secretary, announced details of the new Criminal Justice Bill.

Despite protests and discord against the bill, the opposition Labour Party took an official line to abstain at the third reading, and the act passed into law on 3 November 1994.

== Key measures ==
Key measures of the act that received public attention included:

- Part III, sections 34–39 which substantially changed the right to silence of an accused person, allowing for inferences to be drawn from their silence when cautioned by a constable or other non-police individuals charged with the duty of investigating offences.
- Part IV, sections 54–59 which gave the police greater rights to take and retain intimate body samples.
- Part IV, section 60 which increased police powers of unsupervised stop and search.
- The whole of Part V covered collective trespass and nuisance on land and included sections against raves and further sections against disruptive trespass, squatters, and unauthorised campers – most significantly the criminalisation of previously civil offences. This affected many forms of protest including hunt sabotage and anti-road protests. Sections 63–67 in particular defined any gathering of 20 or more people where:
  63(1)(b) "music" includes sounds wholly or predominantly characterised by the emission of a succession of repetitive beats.
- Part V, section 80, which repealed the duty imposed on councils by the Caravan Sites Act 1968 to provide sites for gypsy and traveller use. Grant aid for the provision of sites was also withdrawn.
- Part VII, which handled "obscenity and pornography", banning simulated child pornography, harshening provisions dealing with the censorship and age restriction of videos (as administered by the British Board of Film Classification BBFC), and also increasing the penalty on obscene phone calls.
- Part XI, which dealt with sexual offences. The definition of rape was extended to include anal rape, previously prosecuted as buggery. This offence was disestablished, as Section 143 – though not given much consideration – legalised anal sex between heterosexual couples over the age of 18. It had been legal for homosexual couples over the age of 21 since 1967. Section 145 lowered the age at which homosexual acts were legal, from 21 years to 18: this latter provision was introduced in the Bill after an amendment by Anthony Durant to that effect had passed in the House of Commons by a vote of 427 to 162 (a majority of 265). In the House of Lords, an attempt to remove section 145 (and as such retain 21 as the age of consent for gay sex) was rejected by a vote of 176 to 113 (a majority of 63). During consideration of the bill, another amendment, introduced by Edwina Currie, which would have further reduced the age of consent for homosexual acts to 16 (thereby equating it with that for heterosexual sex), ended up failing 280–307 (a majority of 27). Analysis of the division list revealed that 42 Conservative MPs had supported equalisation, and the motion would have been carried but for the opposing votes of 38 Labour MPs. In the House of Lords, Lord McIntosh also tried to introduce a provision equalizing the age of consent, but was not successful, with his motion ultimately failing 73–245 (a majority of 172). Most of this section was replaced with the Sexual Offences Act 2003.
- Part XII, which was a miscellany, and included the notice that the "Offence of racially inflammatory publication etc. [was henceforth] to be arrestable", although this was later to be modified by the Serious Organised Crime and Police Act 2005. Part XII also criminalised the use of cells from embryos and foetuses.

== Opposition and protest ==
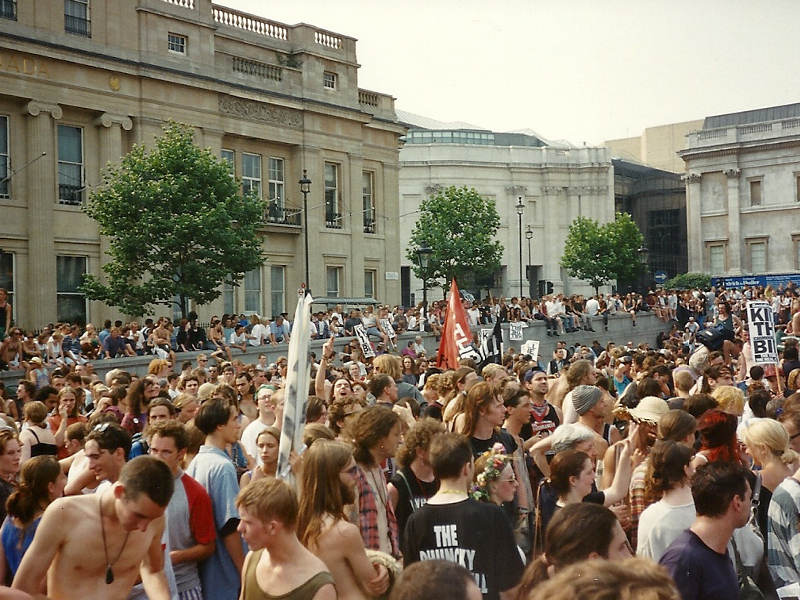
March against the Criminal Justice Bill, London, July 1994.

Whilst the legislation was still under debate, the groups Advance Party and Freedom Network coordinated a campaign of resistance. The group was composed of an alliance of sound systems and civil liberties groups. A movement against the bill grew across "the overlapping squatting, road protest and free party scenes".

Three demonstrations were organised in London throughout 1994. The first of these took place on 1 May (May Day), with an estimated 20,000 people taking part in a march starting at Hyde Park and finishing at Trafalgar Square. The second, on 24 July, followed the same route with numbers estimated between 20,000 and 50,000. The larger turnout was partly attributed to a mobilisation from the Socialist Workers Party and with them placards reading "Kill the Bill", but it also created a degree of "political tension" with the other founding groups.

The third demonstration was called on 9 October, with police estimating 20,000 to 30,000 people attending, while organisers put the figure at over 100,000. The day ended in a riot in Hyde Park that continued into the evening. Accounts stated that, around 5 pm, a confrontation occurred between protesters and police when protesters attempted to bring two sound systems into the park. With such a large number of protesters, the police were overpowered and backed off. Riot and mounted police reinforcements arrived shortly afterwards, and reportedly charged at protesters in an attempt to disperse the estimated 1,500-person crowd.

The civil liberties group Liberty opposed many of the measures proposed by the act at the time, regarding them as "wrong in principle and likely to violate the European Convention on Human Rights".

== Criticism ==
Jon Savage, author of books on youth culture, said of the legislation in Bill form, "It's about politicians making laws on the basis of judging people's lifestyles, and that's no way to make laws". George Monbiot described it as "crude, ill-drafted and repressive". Professor of Cultural Studies Jeremy Gilbert said it was "explicitly aimed at suppressing the activities of certain strands of alternative culture", particularly squatting, direct action, football fan culture, hunt sabotage and the free party.

The sections which specifically refer to parties or raves were, according to Professor of Sociology Nigel South, "badly defined and drafted" in an atmosphere of moral panic following the Castlemorton Common Festival. The law's attempt to define music in terms of "repetitive beats" was described as "bizarre" by Professor of Law Robert Lee.

Reflecting on the time, the journalist Ally Fogg wrote in The Guardian:

Few listened to our warnings then. After all, we were just a bunch of social outcasts with silly hats and questionable personal hygiene. Beyond some welcome support from Liberty and a handful of progressive trades unions, we stood pretty much alone against the whole political and media establishment. This most draconian and illiberal of Conservative laws could only eventually pass through parliament because a young shadow home secretary shocked almost everyone by deciding not to oppose the bill at the final reading. At the time it was assumed that he decided to let the bill through so as not to look soft on crime, or hand a propaganda victory to the Tories. In doing so, he sacrificed several cornerstones of British civil liberties on the altar of political expediency. His name? Tony Blair. Fifteen years on, there is little pleasure to be gained from saying "we told you so". But the manner in which a law designed to prevent the wholesale mayhem of Castlemorton can now be used to foreclose a birthday party should serve as a stark warning to those currently considering a raft of other illiberal legislation, from the coroners and justice bill to the various ID card proposals. Those who deride the contributors to liberty central when they warn about the incessant creep of police powers, or who scoff at "slippery slope" arguments around civil liberties, should bear in mind that we stood at the top of one of those slopes only 15 short years ago, and we have slid a long way down it since.

=== Response from musicians ===
The British IDM duo Autechre released the three-track Anti EP in support of the advocacy group Liberty. The EP contained "Flutter", a song composed to contravene the definition of music in the Act as "repetitive beats" by using 65 distinctive drum patterns. The EP bore a warning advising DJs to "have a lawyer and a musicologist present at all times to confirm the non-repetitive nature of the music in the event of police harassment".

The fifth mix on the Internal version of Orbital's Are We Here? EP was titled "Criminal Justice Bill?". It consisted of approximately four minutes of silence. In their 1995 track Sad But New, Orbital incorporated samples from John Major's 1992 conference speech.

"Their Law", a song by electronic dance acts the Prodigy and Pop Will Eat Itself, was written as a direct response to the bill. A quotation in the booklet of the Prodigy's 1994 album Music for the Jilted Generation read "How can the government stop young people having a good time? Fight this bollocks." The album featured a drawing commissioned by the band from Les Edwards depicting a young male rebel figure protecting a rave from an impending attack of riot police.

In 1993, the band Dreadzone released a single, "Fight the Power", in opposition to the proposed Criminal Justice Bill, featuring samples from Noam Chomsky discussing taking action and "taking control of your lives", advocating political resistance to the proposed bill. The track also features on a 1994 compilation Taking Liberties, released to raise funds to fight the bill. The B-side to Zion Train's 1995 "Dance of Life" single included a track entitled "Resist the Criminal Justice Act".

The Six6 Records compilation album NRB:58 No Repetitive Beats (1994) was released in opposition to the proposed bill. The album's liner notes said:

For every copy of No Repetitive Beats sold Network will pay a royalty to D.I.Y. / All Systems No! (an advance payment of £3,000 was made before the release of the album). The monies will be used by D.I.Y. / All Systems No! towards the cost of a sound system which will be on hand to replace any sound equipment seized by the police using draconian powers granted to them by the Criminal Justice Bill to stop music "wholly or predominantly characterised by the emission of a succession of repetitive beats". The Bill is unjust and tramples across common sense and civil rights. If you want to help throw the CJB out contact the human rights organisation Liberty. Fight for your right to party.

The Streets released the single "Weak Become Heroes", dedicated to the rave culture of the 90s. It featured the lyric "And to the government I stick my middle finger up with regards to the Criminal Justice Bill". It was dedicated to seminal house DJs of the time, such as Paul Oakenfold and Nicky Holloway.

On 6 March 2013, Fatboy Slim (Norman Cook) became the first DJ to perform at the House of Commons in aid of the Last Night a DJ Saved My Life Foundation, which encourages young people to become involved in their communities. Cook said it was a "milestone" to perform there years after the act was passed: "Isn't it brilliant that finally we've wormed our way into the public's consciousness to the extent that we're not seen as a bunch of drug-taking anarchists any more? Dance music is here to stay."

== See also ==
- Public Order Act
- Law of the United Kingdom
- Riot Act
- Stop and Search
- Civil liberties
- Direct action
