= Criminal Justice and Police Act 2001 =

Act of the Parliament of the United Kingdom

Criminal Justice and Police Act 2001 (Note: Section 138(1).)
- Act of Parliament
- Parliament of the United Kingdom
- Long title: An Act to make provision for combatting crime and disorder; to make provision about the disclosure of information relating to criminal matters and about powers of search and seizure; to amend the Police and Criminal Evidence Act 1984, the Police and Criminal Evidence (Northern Ireland) Order 1989 and the Terrorism Act 2000; to make provision about the police, the National Criminal Intelligence Service and the National Crime Squad; to make provision about the powers of the courts in relation to criminal matters; and for connected purposes.
- Citation: 2001 c. 16
- Territorial extent: England and Wales but s 33 -38; Part 2; s 86(1) and (2); s 127; s 136 and 138 Extends to Scotland and Northern Ireland also; s 126 extends to England and Wales and Scotland; s 29, s 39-41, s 72, s 75, s 84 and s 134 extends to England and Wales and Northern Ireland; s 83 and s 86(3) extends to Northern Ireland; An amendment, repeal or revocation contained in schedule 4, 6 or 7 has the same extent as the enactment or instrument to which it relates.; (Note: Section 138(5)–(12).)

Dates
- Royal assent: 11 May 2001
- Commencement: Various (Note: Section 135(2)–(4).)
Other legislation
Amends	Criminal Justice Act 1948; Licensing Act 1964; Firearms Act 1968; Theft Act 1968; Gaming Act 1968; Children and Young Persons Act 1969; Taxes Management Act 1970; Misuse of Drugs Act 1971; Local Government Act 1972; Superannuation Act 1972; Police Pensions Act 1976; Bail Act 1976; Rent Act 1977; Customs and Excise Management Act 1979; County Courts Act 1984; Police and Criminal Evidence Act 1984; Companies Act 1985; Malicious Communications Act 1988; Criminal Justice Act 1988; Police and Criminal Evidence (Northern Ireland) Order 1989; Finance Act 1994; Value Added Tax Act 1994; Finance Act 1996; Police Act 1996; Police Act 1997; Crime and Disorder Act 1998; Protection from Harassment Act 1997; Nuclear Safeguards Act 2000; Powers of Criminal Courts (Sentencing) Act 2000; Terrorism Act 2000; Finance Act 2000
Amended by	Fireworks Act 2003; Crime (International Co-operation) Act 2003; Domestic Violence, Crime and Victims Act 2004; Human Tissue Act 2004; Drugs Act 2005; Terrorism Act 2006; Identity Cards Act 2006; Violent Crime Reduction Act 2006; Criminal Justice and Immigration Act 2008; Human Fertilisation and Embryology Act 2008; Identity Documents Act 2010; Charities Act 2011; Policing and Crime Act 2017; Sentencing Act 2020; Digital Markets, Competition and Consumers Act 2024; Football Governance Act 2025; Renters' Rights Act 2025; Public Authorities (Fraud, Error and Recovery) Act 2025; Border Security, Asylum and Immigration Act 2025
Relates to	International Criminal Court Act 2001

Status: Amended

Text of statute as originally enacted

Revised text of statute as amended

The Criminal Justice and Police Act 2001 (c. 16) is an act of the Parliament of the United Kingdom which gave extra powers to the police, with the aim to tackle crime and disorder more effectively.

== Provisions ==
Key provisions include the introduction of on-the-spot penalties for disorderly behaviour, restrictions on alcohol consumption in public places and the creation of a new criminal offence for protesting outside someone's house in an intimidating manner.

The act enabled local authorities to designate certain areas as having restrictions on drinking alcohol, with the ability to issue fines if people do not stop drinking when asked.

The act enabled police to arrest individuals who were kerb crawling. The act criminalised the distribution of prostitution advertising.

The act reintroduced the ranks of deputy chief constable, deputy assistant commissioner and chief superintendent, which had been abolished by the Police and Magistrates' Courts Act 1994.
