= Violent Crime Reduction Act 2006 =

Act of the Parliament of the United Kingdom

Violent Crime Reduction Act 2006 (Note: Section 66(1).)
- Act of Parliament
- Parliament of the United Kingdom
- Long title: An Act to make provision for reducing and dealing with the abuse of alcohol; to make provision about real and imitation firearms, about ammunition and about knives and other weapons; to amend the Football Spectators Act 1989 and the Football (Disorder) Act 2000; to amend the Sexual Offences Act 2003 and section 8 of the Crime and Disorder Act 1998; to amend section 23 of the Children and Young Persons Act 1969; to amend the Mobile Telephones (Re-programming) Act 2002; and for connected purposes.
- Citation: 2006 c. 38
- Territorial extent: England and Wales (in part); Scotland (in part); Northern Ireland (in part); (Note: Section 66(4)–(8).)

Dates
- Royal assent: 8 November 2006
- Commencement: Various (Note: Section 66(2).)
Other legislation
Amends	Firearms Act 1968; Criminal Appeal Act 1968; Children and Young Persons Act 1969; Licensed Premises (Exclusion of Certain Persons) Act 1980; Magistrates' Courts Act 1980; Mental Health Act 1983; Police and Criminal Evidence Act 1984; Prosecution of Offences Act 1985; Crossbows Act 1987; Criminal Justice Act 1988; Football Spectators Act 1989; Criminal Justice Act 1991; Further and Higher Education Act 1992; Criminal Justice and Public Order Act 1994; Criminal Procedure (Scotland) Act 1995; Criminal Procedure (Consequential Provisions) (Scotland) Act 1995; Education Act 1996; Criminal Justice (Northern Ireland) Order 1996; Data Protection Act 1998; Crime and Disorder Act 1998; Crossbows (Northern Ireland) Order 1988; Football (Offences and Disorder) Act 1999; Access to Justice Act 1999; Powers of Criminal Courts (Sentencing) Act 2000; Football (Disorder) Act 2000; Criminal Justice and Police Act 2001; Private Security Industry Act 2001; Police Reform Act 2002; Football (Disorder) (Amendment) Act 2002; Mobile Telephones (Re-programming) Act 2002; Licensing Act 2003; Anti-social Behaviour Act 2003; Courts Act 2003; Sexual Offences Act 2003; Criminal Justice Act 2003; Anti-Social Behaviour (Northern Ireland) Order 2004; Firearms (Northern Ireland) Order 2004; Protection of Children and Prevention of Sexual Offences (Scotland) Act 2005
Amended by	Criminal Justice and Immigration Act 2008; Sexual Offences (Northern Ireland) Order 2008; Northern Ireland Act 1998 (Devolution of Policing and Justice Functions) Order 2010; Violent Crime Reduction Act 2006 (Specification for Imitation Firearms) Regulations 2011; Police Reform and Social Responsibility Act 2011; Legal Aid, Sentencing and Punishment of Offenders Act 2012; Anti-social Behaviour, Crime and Policing Act 2014; Human Trafficking and Exploitation (Criminal Justice and Support for Victims) Act (Northern Ireland) 2015; Policing and Crime Act 2017; Offensive Weapons Act 2019; Sentencing (Pre-consolidation Amendments) Act 2020; Sentencing Act 2020

Status: Amended

History of passage through Parliament

Text of statute as originally enacted

Revised text of statute as amended

The Violent Crime Reduction Act 2006 (c. 38) is an act of the Parliament of the United Kingdom.

== Origin ==
The United Kingdom Government published a paper "Drinking Responsibly - The Government's Proposals" in January 2005 setting out their proposals for introducing Drinking Banning Orders (DBOs). Schedule 5 of the act repeals the Licensed Premises (Exclusion of Certain Persons) Act 1980 because the exclusions from certain premises under the provisions of that act are made redundant.

== Content ==
The 66 sections and 5 Schedules of the Violent Crime Reduction Act 2006 cover a wide range of measures.

- Part 1 of the Act deals with alcohol-related violence and disorder. (ss. 1 to 27)
- Part 2 deals with weapons. (ss. 28 to 51)
- Part 3 deals with a miscellany: football disorder, sexual offences, anti-social behaviour, parenting orders, mobile phone reprogramming, and licensing in relation to sports grounds. It repealed and replaced large sections of the Football Spectators Act 1989. (ss. 52 to 63)
- Part 4 of the Act deals with general housekeeping like expenses and repeals. (ss. 64 to 66)

== Commencement ==
- The Violent Crime Reduction Act 2006 (Commencement No. 1) Order 2007 (S.I. 2007/74 (C.3)). This Order brings into force sections 42, 54, 55 and 57 of, and Schedule 4 to, the Violent Crime Reduction Act 2006 on 12 February 2007. These provisions-
  - increase the maximum sentences for knife possession offences
  - provide for the forfeiture and detention of vehicles etc. connected with sexual offences
  - ensure the continuity of sexual offences law following the Sexual Offences Act 2003 and
  - amend section 82 of the Sexual Offences Act 2003 (notification periods) for offenders subject to sentences of imprisonment for public protection
- The Violent Crime Reduction Act 2006 (Commencement No. 2) Order 2007 (S.I. 2007/858 (C.35)). This Order brings into force on 6 April 2007 the provisions of the Violent Crime Reduction Act 2006 which are listed in article 2 and brings into force on 31 May 2007 the provisions of that Act which are listed in article 3. The provisions in article 3(a) and (b) are only commenced in England.
- The Violent Crime Reduction Act 2006 (Commencement No. 3) Order 2007 (S.I. 2007/2180 (C.83)). This Order brings into force on 22 August 2007 section 22 of the Violent Crime Reduction Act 2006. This Order also brings into force on 1 October 2007 the provisions of that Act which are listed in article 3 and (to the extent that they are not already in force) article 4.
- The Violent Crime Reduction Act 2006 (Commencement No. 4) Order 2007 (S.I. 2007/2518 (C.95)). This Order brings into force on 1 October 2007 section 41 of the Violent Crime Reduction Act 2006. This Order also brings into force on 1 October 2007 (to the extent that they are not already in force) the provisions of that Act which are listed in article 3.
- The Violent Crime Reduction Act 2006 (Commencement No. 5) Order 2008 (S.I. 2008/791 (C.38))
- The Violent Crime Reduction Act 2006 (Commencement No. 6) Order 2008 (S.I. 2008/1407 (C.62))
- The Violent Crime Reduction Act 2006 (Commencement No. 7) Order 2009 (S.I. 2009/1840 (C.89))
- The Violent Crime Reduction Act 2006 (Commencement No. 8) Order 2010 (S.I. 2010/469 (C.33))
- The Violent Crime Reduction Act 2006 (Commencement No. 9) Order 2010 (S.I. 2010/2541 (C.121))
- The Violent Crime Reduction Act 2006 (Commencement No. 1) (Wales) Order 2010 (S.I. 2010/2426 (W.208) (C.119))

== Reception ==
The legislation was criticised by Chris Keates, general secretary of NASUWT, for exposing teachers to more risk to violence and legal jeopardy.
