= Section 5 of the Public Order Act 1986 =

Element of a statutory offence in England and Wales

Section 5 of the Public Order Act 1986 creates a statutory offence in England and Wales, including the use of "threatening or abusive" words or behaviour likely to cause "harassment, alarm or distress". The word "insulting" was originally included in the first quoted phrase, but was removed when section 5 was amended in 2014.

An aggravated form of the offence, "intentional harassment, alarm or distress", was added as section 4A of the same Act by the Criminal Justice and Public Order Act 1994.

== The offence ==
The offence is created by section 5 of the Public Order Act 1986. Section 5(1) provides:

"(1) A person is guilty of an offence if he/she:

(a) uses threatening or abusive words or behaviour, or disorderly behaviour, or
(b) displays any writing, sign or other visible representation which is threatening or abusive,

within the hearing or sight of a person likely to be caused harassment, alarm or distress thereby."

In February 2014 Parliament passed a redaction of the statute which removed the word "insulting" in subsections "a" and "b" following pressure from citizens.

This offence has the following statutory defences:

(a) The defendant had no reason to believe that there was any person within hearing or sight who was likely to be alarmed or distressed by his action.
(b) The defendant was in a dwelling and had no reason to believe that his behaviour would be seen or heard by any person outside any dwelling.
(c) The conduct was reasonable.

=== Police officers ===
In DPP v Orum [1989] 1 WLR 88, [1988] 3 All ER 449, [1989] 88 Cr App R 261 the Divisional Court confirmed that police officers are not unable to be victims of section 5 of the Public Order Act 1986 caused by swearing and other abusive/threatening behaviour, but this behaviour must be in excess of what the officer is or should be used to.

Glidewell LJ said:

I find nothing in the context of the Act of 1986 to persuade me that a police officer may not be a person who is caused harassment, alarm or distress by the various kinds of words and conduct to which section 5(1) applies. I would therefore answer the question in the affirmative, that a police officer can be a person likely to be caused harassment and so on. However, that is not to say that the opposite is necessarily the case, namely, it is not to say that every police officer in this situation is to be assumed to be a person who is caused harassment. Very frequently words and behaviour with which police officers will be wearily familiar will have little emotional impact on them save that of boredom. It may well be that, in appropriate circumstances, justices will decide (indeed they might decide in the present case) as a question of fact that the words and behaviour were not likely in all the circumstances to cause harassment, alarm or distress to either of the police officers. That is a question of fact for the justices to be decided in all the circumstances, the time, the place, the nature of the words used, who the police officers are, and so on.

In Southard v DPP [2006] EWHC 3449 (Admin), [2006] All ER (D) 101, Fulford J. said "I see no basis for the original written argument that this criminal provision is not available when police officers alone are the likely audience or target.", although the court acknowledged the tide is slowly turning on such incidents:

"Finally, although the court considered that the facts of this case came near to the borderline as to whether the ingredients of the offence were made out, it is clear that they concluded"

Holloway v DPP (Admn 21 Oct 2004) Ref: [2004] EWHC 2621 (Admin)) also states that a charge relying on the fact that someone "might have, or could have seen" the conduct is insufficient, compared to whether or not anyone actually did.

DPP v Harvey (17 Nov 2011) [2011] EWHC 3992 (Admin), [2011] EWHC B1 (Admin) upheld an appeal quashing a conviction for a section 5 offence. The appellant had been searched by two Police Officers and swore at them. Neither officer said they were harassed, alarmed or distressed by the words and could not show how any member of the public was affected. Appeal held.

=== Limits: Freedom of speech ===
Clause (c) allows for a defence on the grounds of reasonable behaviour. This interpretation will depend upon case law.

In Dehal v Crown Prosecution Service, Mr Justice Moses ruled that in cases involving freedom of expression, prosecution is unlawful unless it is necessary to prevent public disorder: "a criminal prosecution was unlawful as a result of section 3 of the Human Rights Act and Article 10 unless and until it could be established that such a prosecution was necessary in order to prevent public disorder". This case involved an individual placing a sign critical of religious leaders.

Case law may go further and revolve around the prevention of violence. In considering another section 5 case, Lord Justice Auld quoted Redmond-Bate v DPP (a case involving breach of the peace), "Free speech includes not only the inoffensive, but the irritating, the contentious, the eccentric, the heretical, the unwelcome and the provocative provided it does not tend to provoke violence".

However, in Abdul v DPP, Lord Justice Gross ruled that to some degree such rules were a matter of fact to be handled by lower courts and not a matter for appeal, stating "If the lower courts themselves approached the matter having duly considered all the relevant principles, the appellate courts will – also on established principles, applicable to appellate courts – be disinclined to interfere." noting that in Dehal v CPS the lower court had not considered Article 10 in any way.

In a similar case in 2003, before "insulting" was removed from the Act, a defendant who displayed a poster saying "Islam out of Britain" was found guilty and denied appeal.

== Mode of trial and sentence ==
The offence created by section 5 is a summary offence. It is punishable with a fine not exceeding level 3 on the standard scale (£1,000 as of 2015).

== Arrest ==
Sections 5(4) and (5) of the 1986 Act formerly provided a statutory power of arrest (which required a warning to be given beforehand). They were repealed by section 174 of, and Part 2 of Schedule 17 to, the Serious Organised Crime and Police Act 2005. Arrest for this offence is now governed by section 24 of the Police and Criminal Evidence Act 1984 (as substituted by the 2005 Act).

== Statistics ==
There were four to five thousand prosecutions for harassment, alarm or distress brought each year in England and Wales during the 2001–2003 period, with approximately three thousand cases resulting in conviction.

== Intentional harassment, alarm or distress ==
Section 4A of the Public Order Act 1986, which was added to the Act by the Criminal Justice and Public Order Act 1994, created the distinct aggravated offence of intentional harassment, alarm or distress.

== Racially or religiously aggravated offence ==
Section 31(1)(c) of the Crime and Disorder Act 1998 (c.37) creates the distinct offence of racially or religiously aggravated harassment, alarm or distress.
