= Football (Disorder) Act 2000 =

Act of the Parliament of the United Kingdom

Football (Disorder) Act 2000 (Note: Section 7.)
- Act of Parliament
- Parliament of the United Kingdom
- Long title: An Act to make further provision for the purpose of preventing violence or disorder at or in connection with association football matches; and for connected purposes.
- Citation: 2000 c. 25
- Introduced by: Jack Straw (Commons)
- Territorial extent: England and Wales (Note: Section 6(1).)

Dates
- Royal assent: 28 July 2000
- Commencement: 28 August 2000 (Note: Section 5. The Football (Disorder) Act 2000 (Commencement) Order 2000.)
Other legislation
Amends	Criminal Appeal Act 1968; Magistrates' Courts Act 1980; Public Order Act 1986; Legal Aid Act 1988; Football Spectators Act 1989; Football (Offences) Act 1991; Criminal Justice and Public Order Act 1994; Police Act 1996; Police Act 1997; Crime and Disorder Act 1998; Football (Offences and Disorder) Act 1999; Powers of Criminal Courts (Sentencing) Act 2000
Amended by	Football (Disorder) (Amendment) Act 2002; Serious Organised Crime and Police Act 2005; Violent Crime Reduction Act 2006

Status: Amended

Text of statute as originally enacted

Revised text of statute as amended

The Football (Disorder) Act 2000 (c. 25) is an act of the Parliament of the United Kingdom enacted during the premiership of Tony Blair. It served as an amendment to the Football Spectators Act 1989, and strengthened football banning orders (FBOs), a civil order imposed to those convicted of football-related offences. FBOs may be issued by courts in the United Kingdom, or following a complaint from a local police force.

The Act was "rushed through Parliament" by then-Home Secretary Jack Straw following violent clashes during UEFA Euro 2000. It allows police in England and Wales to arrest those suspected of travelling abroad to participate in hooliganism at international games, and to withhold their passports up to five days before an international fixture. Straw stated during an opposition day for his Bill that he was keen to enact the new laws in time for England's next international game against France in September 2000.

FBOs, introduced by Football Spectators Act 1989, may ban an individual from football grounds in the United Kingdom for two to ten years, with provisions for individual cases. Supporters may also be barred from using public transport on matchdays, and from town centres and built-up, high-risk areas prior to and following matches.

The Act has been criticised by civil liberties campaigners for being "draconian", fearing it may result in profiling based on fan appearance.

More than 450 supporters were prevented from travelling to Greece for a World Cup qualifier in 2001 under the Act.
