= Tumultuous Petitioning Act 1661 =

Act of the Parliament of England

Tumultuous Petitioning Act 1661 (Note: The citation of this act by this short title was authorised by section 5 of, and the second schedule to, the Statute Law Revision Act 1948. Due to the repeal of those provisions, it is now authorised by section 19(2) of the Interpretation Act 1978.)
- Act of Parliament
- Parliament of England
- Long title: An Act against Tumults and Disorders upon pretence of preparing or presenting Peticions or other Addresses to His Majesty or the Parliament. (Note: These words are printed against this act in the second column of the second schedule to the Statute Law Revision Act 1948, which is headed "Title".)
- Citation: 13 Cha. 2 St. 1. c. 5
- Territorial extent: England and Wales

Dates
- Royal assent: 30 July 1661
- Commencement: 1 August 1661 (Note: Section 1.)
- Repealed: 1 April 1987 (Note: The Public Order Act 1986 (Commencement No. 2) Order 1987 (SI 1987/198).)
Other legislation
Amended by	Criminal Law Act 1967
Repealed by	Public Order Act 1986
Relates to	Sedition Act 1661

Status: Repealed

Text of statute as originally enacted

The Tumultuous Petitioning Act 1661 (13 Cha. 2 St. 1. c. 5) was an act of the Parliament of England. Its long title was "An Act against Tumults and Disorders upon pretence of preparing or presenting publick Peticions or other Addresses to His Majesty or the Parliament".

Petitions to either the House of Commons or House of Lords seem to have been later in origin than petitions to the Crown. They are not referred to in the Bill of Rights (1688 or 1689), but the right of petition is a convention of the constitution. Petitions to the Lords or the whole Parliament can be traced back to Henry III. No petition to the Commons has been found earlier than Richard II; but from the time of Henry IV petitions to the Commons have been freely made. The political importance of petitioning dates from about the reign of Charles I. The development of the practice of petitioning had proceeded so far in the reign of Charles II as to lead to the passing in 1661 of an act against "tumultuous petitioning". It provides that no petition or address shall be presented to the king or either house of Parliament by more than ten persons; nor shall any one procure above twenty persons to consent or set their hands to any petition for alteration of matters established by law in church or state, unless with the previous order of three justices of the county, or the major part of the grand jury.

== Subsequent developments ==
In section 1, the words from " at the Court " to " quarter sessions " were repealed by section 10(2) of, and part I of schedule 3 to, the Criminal Law Act 1967, which came into force on 1 January 1968.

The whole act was repealed by section 40(3) of, and schedule 3 to, the Public Order Act 1986, which came into force on 1 April 1987.

== See also ==
- Sedition Act 1661
