= Fear or provocation of violence =

Criminal offence in England and Wales

Fear or provocation of violence is a statutory offence in England and Wales created under the Public Order Act 1986.

The offence is created by section 4 of the Public Order Act 1986:

(1) A person is guilty of an offence if he -

(a) uses towards another person threatening behaviour, or
(b) distributes or displays to another person any writing, sign or other visible representation which is threatening

with intent to cause that person to believe that immediate unlawful violence will be used against him or another by any person, or to provoke the immediate use of unlawful violence by that person or another, or whereby that person is likely to believe that such violence will be used or it is likely that such violence will be provoked.

(2) An offence under this section may be committed in a public or a private place, except that no offence is committed where the words or behaviour are used, or the writing, sign or other visible representation is distributed or displayed, by a person inside a dwelling and the other person is also inside that dwelling.

It replaces the offence under section 5 of the Public Order Act 1936.

== Mode of trial and sentence ==
This is a summary offence. It is punishable with imprisonment for a term not exceeding six months, or a fine not exceeding level 5 on the standard scale, or both.

== Arrest ==
Section 4(3) of the 1986 Act formerly provided that a constable could arrest without warrant anyone he reasonably suspected was committing this offence. This was repealed by section 174 of, and Part 2 of Schedule 17 to, the Serious Organised Crime and Police Act 2005.

== Racially aggravated offence ==
The Crime and Disorder Act 1998 (c.37) creates a label of "racially-aggravated" in its Section 28, Meaning of “racially aggravated”. It describes here what is indicated by the term "racially aggravated", and describes “racial group”: "means a group of persons defined by reference to race, colour, nationality (including citizenship) or ethnic or national origins."

Section 29 deals with racially aggravated assaults, while Section 30 creates a category of "racially-aggravated criminal damage".

Section 31 Racially-aggravated public order offences creates the distinct offence of racially aggravated fear or provocation of violence.

Section 32 deals with Racially-aggravated harassment etc..
