= Crime (International Co-operation) Act 2003 =

Act of the Parliament of the United Kingdom

Crime (International Co-operation) Act 2003 (Note: Section 96.)
- Act of Parliament
- Parliament of the United Kingdom
- Long title: An Act to make provision for furthering co-operation with other countries in respect of criminal proceedings and investigations; to extend jurisdiction to deal with terrorist acts or threats outside the United Kingdom; to amend section 5 of the Forgery and Counterfeiting Act 1981 and make corresponding provision in relation to Scotland; and for connected purposes.
- Citation: 2003 c. 32
- Territorial extent: England and Wales; Scotland; Northern Ireland; (Note: Section 95.)

Dates
- Royal assent: 30 October 2003
- Commencement: Various (Note: Section 94.)
Other legislation
Amends	Internationally Protected Persons Act 1978; Suppression of Terrorism Act 1978; Forgery and Counterfeiting Act 1981; Road Traffic (Northern Ireland) Order 1981; Nuclear Material (Offences) Act 1983; Child Abduction Act 1984; Criminal Justice Act 1987; Criminal Justice Act 1988; Road Traffic Act 1988; Road Traffic Offenders Act 1988; Criminal Justice (Evidence, Etc.) (Northern Ireland) Order 1988; Criminal Justice (International Co-operation) Act 1990; Criminal Justice and Public Order Act 1994; Road Traffic (New Drivers) Act 1995; Criminal Law (Consolidation) (Scotland) Act 1995; Criminal Procedure (Scotland) Act 1995; United Nations Personnel Act 1997; Data Protection Act 1998; Powers of Criminal Courts (Sentencing) Act 2000; Terrorism Act 2000; Regulation of Investigatory Powers Act 2000; Criminal Justice and Police Act 2001; Armed Forces Act 2001; Anti-terrorism, Crime and Security Act 2001; Proceeds of Crime Act 2002
Amended by	Criminal Justice Act 2003; Criminal Justice (Evidence) (Northern Ireland) Order 2004; Extradition Act 2003 (Repeals) Order 2004; Constitutional Reform Act 2005; Serious Organised Crime and Police Act 2005; Courts Act 2003 (Consequential Provisions) Order 2005; Road Safety Act 2006; Armed Forces Act 2006; Serious Crime Act 2007; Police and Criminal Evidence (Amendment) (Northern Ireland) Order 2007; Criminal Justice and Immigration Act 2008; Northern Ireland Act 1998 (Devolution of Policing and Justice Functions) Order 2010; Treaty of Lisbon (Changes in Terminology) Order 2011; Legal Aid, Sentencing and Punishment of Offenders Act 2012; Crime and Courts Act 2013; Police and Fire Reform (Scotland) Act 2012 (Consequential Provisions and Modifications) Order 2013; Criminal Justice and Courts Act 2015; Road Safety Act 2006 (Consequential Amendments) Order 2015; Justice Act (Northern Ireland) 2015; Law Enforcement and Security (Amendment) (EU Exit) Regulations 2019; Sentencing Act 2020; Crime (International Co-operation) Act 2003 (Freezing Order) (England and Wales and Northern Ireland) Regulations 2021; Crime (International Co-operation) Act 2003 (Freezing Order) (EU Exit) (Scotland) Regulations 2022; Automated Vehicles Act 2024

Status: Amended

Text of statute as originally enacted

Text of the Crime (International Co-operation) Act 2003 as in force today (including any amendments) within the United Kingdom, from legislation.gov.uk.

The Crime (International Co-operation) Act 2003 (c. 32) is an act of the Parliament of the United Kingdom covering mutual legal assistance.

== Provisions ==
The act replaced the Criminal Justice (International Co-operation) Act 1990.

== Applications ==
The act allowed for a successful request by the Police Service of Northern Ireland and the Public Prosecution Service relating to recordings from Dr Anthony McIntyre for the Boston-based Belfast Project.
