= Criminal Defence Service Act 2006 =

Public General Act of Parliament of the United Kingdom

Criminal Defence Service Act 2006 (Note: Section 5(1).)
- Act of Parliament
- Parliament of the United Kingdom
- Long title: An Act to make provision about representation funded as part of the Criminal Defence Service.
- Citation: 2006 c. 9
- Territorial extent: England and Wales (Note: Section 5(4).)

Dates
- Royal assent: 30 March 2006
- Commencement: 30 March 2006 (section 5); 2 October 2006 (section 1–4).; (Note: Section 5(2)–(3). The Criminal Defence Service Act 2006 (Commencement) Order 2006 (SI 2006/2491).)
Other legislation
Amended by	Legal Aid, Sentencing and Punishment of Offenders Act 2012; Sentencing Act 2020

Status: Amended

History of passage through Parliament

Text of statute as originally enacted

Revised text of statute as amended

The Criminal Defence Service Act 2006 (c. 9) is an act of the Parliament of the United Kingdom. It makes provision about legal representation funded as part of the Criminal Defence Service.

Sections 1 to 4 came into force on 2 October 2006.

== Provisions ==
The act introduces means testing to the legal aid system. The Legal Services Commission became responsible for assessing eligibility.

=== Section 1 – Grant of rights to representation ===
This section amends schedule 3 to the Access to Justice Act 1999.

=== Section 2 – Rights to representation: financial eligibility ===
This section amends sections 25 and 26 of, and schedule 3 to, the Access to Justice Act 1999.

=== Section 3 – Rights to representation: contribution orders ===
Section 3(2) amends section 17 of the Access to Justice Act 1999. Section 3(3) inserts section 17A of that act. Section 3(4) amends section 25 of that act.

=== Section 4 – Consequential amendments ===
Section 4(1) amends the Attachment of Earnings Act 1971. Section 4(3) amends the Children and Young Persons Act 1969 and the Powers of Criminal Courts (Sentencing) Act 2000.

=== Section 5 – Short title, commencement and extent ===
This section came into force on 30 March 2006.

The Criminal Defence Service Act 2006 (Commencement) Order 2006 (SI 2006/2491 (C. 83)) was made under section 5(2).
