= Powers of Criminal Courts Act 1973 =

Act of the Parliament of the United Kingdom

Powers of Criminal Courts Act 1973 (Note: Section 60(1).)
- Act of Parliament
- Parliament of the United Kingdom
- Long title: An Act to consolidate certain enactments relating to the powers of courts to deal with offenders and defaulters, to the treatment of offenders and to arrangements for persons on bail.
- Citation: 1973 c. 62
- Territorial extent: England and Wales; Scotland; (Note: Section 58.)

Dates
- Royal assent: 25 October 1973
- Commencement: 1 July 1974 (Note: Section 60(2). The Powers of Criminal Courts Act 1973 (Commencement No. 1) Order 1974 (SI 1974/941). Sections 6(3)(b), (6)(b) and (10) were not brought into force by this order.)
- Repealed: 25 August 2000
Other legislation
Amends	Protection of Military Remains Act 1986; See § Repealed enactments
Repeals/revokes	See § Repealed enactments
Amended by	Legal Aid Act 1974; Criminal Procedure (Scotland) Act 1975; Statute Law (Repeals) Act 1977; Administration of Justice Act 1977; Magistrates' Courts Act 1980; Road Traffic (Consequential Provisions) Act 1988; Extradition Act 1989; Probation Service Act 1993; Crime and Disorder Act 1998
Repealed by	Powers of Criminal Courts (Sentencing) Act 2000

Status: Repealed

Text of statute as originally enacted

Revised text of statute as amended

The Powers of Criminal Courts Act 1973 (c. 62) was an act of the Parliament of the United Kingdom that consolidated enactments relating to the powers of courts to deal with offenders and defaulters, to the treatment of offenders and to arrangements for persons on bail in England and Wales.

== Provisions ==
=== Repealed enactments ===
Section 56(2) of the act repealed 15 enactments, listed in schedule 6 to the act.

Enactments repealed by section 56(2)
Citation	Short title	Extent of repeal
11 & 12 Geo. 6. c. 58	Criminal Justice Act 1948	Sections 3 to 12 and 14.
11 & 12 Geo. 6. c. 58	Criminal Justice Act 1948	Section 17(1), (2) and (6).
11 & 12 Geo. 6. c. 58	Criminal Justice Act 1948	Sections 29, 43 and 45 to 47.
11 & 12 Geo. 6. c. 58	Criminal Justice Act 1948	Section 77, except subsection (6), and, in subsection (1), the words "Any expenses of the Secretary of State under this Act" and the words from "shall" to the end of the subsection.
11 & 12 Geo. 6. c. 58	Criminal Justice Act 1948	In section 80, in subsection (1) the definitions of "approved probation hostel", "approved probation home", "offence the sentence for which is fixed by law", "order for conditional discharge", "period of conditional discharge", "probationer", "probation order", "probation period", "sum adjudged to be paid by a conviction" and "supervising court", and subsection (5).
11 & 12 Geo. 6. c. 58	Criminal Justice Act 1948	Section 81, so far as relates to sections 8, 9, 11 and 12.
11 & 12 Geo. 6. c. 58	Criminal Justice Act 1948	Schedules 1 and 5.
11 & 12 Geo. 6. c. 58	Criminal Justice Act 1948	In Schedule 8, paragraphs 3 to 9.
12, 13 & 14 Geo. 6. c. 94	Criminal Justice (Scotland) Act 1949	In Schedule 11, the entry relating to section 9 of the Criminal Justice Act 1948.
12, 13 & 14 Geo. 6. c. 101	Justices of the Peace Act 1949	Sections 36 and 37.
15 & 16 Geo. 6 & 1 Eliz. 2. c. 55	Magistrates' Courts Act 1952	Section 107(2), (3).
15 & 16 Geo. 6 & 1 Eliz. 2. c. 55	Magistrates' Courts Act 1952	In section 110(1), the words "thirty-nine or".
7 & 8 Eliz. 2. c. 72	Mental Health Act 1959	In Part I of Schedule 7, the entry relating to the Criminal Justice Act 1948.
9 & 10 Eliz. 2. c. 39	Criminal Justice Act 1961	Section 2(2).
9 & 10 Eliz. 2. c. 39	Criminal Justice Act 1961	Section 9.
1964 c. 42	Administration of Justice Act 1964	Section 22.
1964 c. 42	Administration of Justice Act 1964	In section 31, subsection (1) in so far as it amends s. 36 of the Justices of the Peace Act 1949.
1964 c. 42	Administration of Justice Act 1964	In Schedule 3, paragraph 19(2), (3).
1967 c. 58	Criminal Law Act 1967	Section 7.
1967 c. 80	Criminal Justice Act 1967	Sections 37 to 42.
1967 c. 80	Criminal Justice Act 1967	Section 47.
1967 c. 80	Criminal Justice Act 1967	In section 48, in subsection (1) the words "of a magistrates' court or", the words from "section 72A" to "Scotland) or", and the words "magistrates' court or", and subsection (2).
1967 c. 80	Criminal Justice Act 1967	In section 50, the words from "and in" to the end of the section.
1967 c. 80	Criminal Justice Act 1967	Sections 52 and 53.
1967 c. 80	Criminal Justice Act 1967	In section 54, subsections (1) to (3), (5) and (7).
1967 c. 80	Criminal Justice Act 1967	Sections 55 and 57.
1967 c. 80	Criminal Justice Act 1967	Section 95 except subsection (1).
1967 c. 80	Criminal Justice Act 1967	Section 96.
1967 c. 80	Criminal Justice Act 1967	Section 99.
1967 c. 80	Criminal Justice Act 1967	Section 106(3)(b), so far as relates to section 38(7).
1967 c. 80	Criminal Justice Act 1967	In Schedule 6, paragraph 6.
1968 c. 69	Justices of the Peace Act 1968	Section 4(5) and (6).
1969 c. 54	Children and Young Persons Act 1969	Section 7(2).
1969 c. 54	Children and Young Persons Act 1969	In Schedule 4, paragraph 5(2).
1969 c. 54	Children and Young Persons Act 1969	In Schedule 5, paragraph 45.
1971 c. 23	Courts Act 1971	Section 53(2)(a).
1971 c. 23	Courts Act 1971	In Schedule 8: in paragraph 24, sub-paragraph (a) and in sub-paragraph (b) the words "14(5)"; paragraphs 25 to 27; paragraph 48(a), so far as relates to sections 40, 41, 47, 48 and 54 of the Criminal Justice Act 1967; paragraphs 51, 53 and 54.
1971 c. 72	Industrial Relations Act 1971	In Schedule 3, in paragraph 28(1) the words "to a court of assize or".
1972 c. 70	Local Government Act 1972	In section 217(5), the words from "but" to the end of the subsection.
1972 c. 71	Criminal Justice Act 1972	Part I except sections 6, 23(5) and (6), and 24(2) to (4).
1972 c. 71	Criminal Justice Act 1972	Sections 37, 40, 51(3), 52 to 57, and 66(3) and (4).
1972 c. 71	Criminal Justice Act 1972	Schedule 1.
1972 c. 71	Criminal Justice Act 1972	In Schedule 5, the entry relating to the Criminal Justice Act 1948, paragraphs (b), (e), (f) and (g) of the entry relating to the Criminal Justice Act 1967, and paragraph (b) of the entry relating to Part I of Schedule 9 to the Administration of Justice Act 1970.

== Subsequent developments ==
The whole act was repealed by sections 165 and 168(1) of, and part I of schedule 12 to, the Powers of Criminal Courts (Sentencing) Act 2000, which came into force on 25 August 2000.
