= Public Order Act 1986 =

Act of the Parliament of the United Kingdom for public order offences

Public Order Act 1986 (Note: Section 43.)
- Act of Parliament
- Parliament of the United Kingdom
- Long title: An Act to abolish the common law offences of riot, rout, unlawful assembly and affray and certain statutory offences relating to public order; to create new offences relating to public order.
- Citation: 1986 c. 64
- Introduced by: Douglas Hurd
- Territorial extent: England and Wales; Scotland (in part); Northern Ireland (in part); (Note: Section 42.)

Dates
- Royal assent: 7 November 1986
- Commencement: 1 January 1987 (in part) (Note: The Public Order Act 1986 (Commencement No. 1) Order 1986 (SI 1986/2041).); 1 April 1987 (in part) (Note: The Public Order Act 1986 (Commencement No. 2) Order 1987 (SI 1987/198).); 1 August 1987 (rest of act) (Note: The Public Order Act 1986 (Commencement No. 3) Order 1987 (SI 1987/852).); (Note: Section 41.)
Other legislation
Amends	Prevention of Crime Act 1953; See § Repealed enactments
Repeals/revokes	See § Repealed enactments
Amended by	Football Spectators Act 1989; Broadcasting Act 1990; Trade Union and Labour Relations (Consolidation) Act 1992; Criminal Justice and Public Order Act 1994; Merchant Shipping Act 1995; Scotland Act 1998; Football (Offences and Disorder) Act 1999; Football (Disorder) Act 2000; Anti-terrorism, Crime and Security Act 2001; Racial and Religious Hatred Act 2006; Government of Wales Act 2006; Criminal Justice and Immigration Act 2008; Crime and Courts Act 2013; Marriage (Same Sex Couples) Act 2013; Riot Compensation Act 2016; Sentencing Act 2020; Public Order Act 2023

Status: Amended

Text of statute as originally enacted

Revised text of statute as amended

Text of the Public Order Act 1986 as in force today (including any amendments) within the United Kingdom, from legislation.gov.uk.

The Public Order Act 1986 (c. 64) is an act of the Parliament of the United Kingdom that creates a number of public order offences. They replace similar common law offences and parts of the Public Order Act 1936 (1 Edw. 8 & 1 Geo. 6. c. 6). At first the law implemented the 1983 recommendations of the Law Commission; later on it was amended by the Blair government to include Parts 3 and 3A.

== Background ==
Before the introduction of the act, policing public order was based on various relevant common law offences, and the Public Order Act 1936 (1 Edw. 8 & 1 Geo. 6. c. 6). Several factors influenced the introduction of the Public Order Act 1986. Significant public disorder, such as the Southall riot in 1979, the Brixton riot that extended to other cities in 1981, and the national miners' strike and associated disorder between 1984 and 1985 – in particular the Battle of Orgreave in June 1984 – and the Battle of the Beanfield in June 1985. Furthermore, the 1983 Law Commission report, Criminal Law: Offences Relating to Public Order recommended updating the law.

The Law Commission stated its desire to further to extend the codification of the law in England and Wales. It advocated the abolition of the common law offences of affray, riot, rout, and unlawful assembly. It argued the changes it recommended to public order legislation made it more practical to use, and make the law more comprehensible to the courts and juries.

The long title of the act details the intention of the Public Order Act 1986:

An Act to abolish the common law offences of riot, rout, unlawful assembly and affray and certain statutory offences relating to public order; to create new offences relating to public order; to control public processions and assemblies; to control the stirring up of racial hatred; to provide for the exclusion of certain offenders from sporting events; to create a new offence relating to the contamination of or interference with goods; to confer power to direct certain trespassers to leave land; to amend section 7 of the Conspiracy, and Protection of Property Act 1875, section 1 of the Prevention of Crime Act 1953, Part V of the Criminal Justice (Scotland) Act 1980 and the Sporting Events (Control of Alcohol etc.) Act 1985; to repeal certain obsolete or unnecessary enactments; and for connected purposes.

== Offences ==
=== Part 1 – New offences ===
- Section 1 – Riot
- Section 2 – Violent disorder
- Section 3 – Affray
- Section 4 – Fear or provocation of violence
- Section 4A – Intentional harassment, alarm or distress: added by section 154 of the Criminal Justice and Public Order Act 1994
- Section 5 – Harassment, alarm or distress

==== Section 8 – Interpretation ====
This section defines the words "dwelling" and "violence".

==== Section 9 – Offences abolished ====
Section 9(1) abolished the common law offences of riot, rout, unlawful assembly and affray.

Section 9(2) abolished the offences under:

- section 1 of the Tumultuous Petitioning Act 1661
- section 1 of the Shipping Offences Act 1793
- section 23 of the Seditious Meetings Act 1817
- section 5 of the Public Order Act 1936

=== Part 2 – Processions and assemblies ===
Section 11 – Advance notice of public processions
Requires at least six clear days' written notice to be given to the police before most public processions, including details of the intended time and route, and giving the name and address of at least one person proposing to organise it; creates offences for the organisers of a procession if they do not give sufficient notice, or if the procession diverges from the notified time or route.

Section 12 – Imposing conditions on public processions
Provides police the power to impose conditions on processions "to prevent serious public disorder, serious criminal damage or serious disruption to the life of the community".

Section 13 – Prohibiting public processions
A chief police officer has the power to ban public processions up to three months by applying to local authority for a banning order which needs subsequent confirmation from the Home Secretary.

Section 14 – Imposing conditions on public assemblies
Provides police the power to impose conditions on assemblies "to prevent serious public disorder, serious criminal damage or serious disruption to the life of the community". The conditions are limited to the specifying of:
- the number of people who may take part,
- the location of the assembly, and
- its maximum duration.

The Police, Crime, Sentencing and Courts Act 2022 amended Section 14 to permit police to impose conditions on public assemblies in England and Wales in cases where the noise produced may 'seriously disrupt' nearby organisations or have a 'significant impact' on people in the vicinity. This amendment has been widely criticized by civil liberties organisations such as Liberty, which argued that noise is an essential element of effective protest.

Section 14A – Prohibiting trespassory assemblies
Added by section 70 of the Criminal Justice and Public Order Act 1994, to control "raves".

Section 16 – Public assembly
Originally meant an assembly of 20 or more persons in a public place which is wholly or partly open to the air. The Anti-social Behaviour Act 2003 amended the act to reduce the minimum numbers of people in an assembly to two, and removed the requirement to be in the open air.

=== Parts 3 and 3A – Speech laws ===
==== Racial and religious hatred ====
If the act is intended to stir up racial hatred Part 3 of the act creates offences of

- use of words or behaviour or display of written material (section 18),
- publishing or distributing written material (section 19),
- public performance of a play (section 20),
- distributing, showing or playing a recording (section 21),
- broadcasting (section 22), or
- possession of racially inflammatory material (section 23).

Acts intended to stir up religious hatred are proscribed in POA Part 3A by the Racial and Religious Hatred Act 2006 (RRHA) with the insertion of new sections 29A to 29N. The RRHA bill, which was introduced by Home Secretary David Blunkett, was amended several times in the House of Lords and ultimately the Blair government was forced to accept the substitute words.

==== Hatred on the grounds of sexual orientation ====
To stir up hatred on the grounds of sexual orientation was to be proscribed by the Criminal Justice and Immigration Act 2008 in POA Part 3A section 29AB. This legislation was introduced by David Hanson during his time as Minister of State affected to the Secretary of State for Justice under Jack Straw.

=== Repealed enactments ===
Section 40(3) of the act repealed 25 enactments, listed in schedule 3 to the act.

Enactments repealed by section 40(3)
Citation	Short title	Extent of repeal
13 Chas. 2. Stat. 1. c. 5	Tumultuous Petitioning Act 1661	The whole act.
33 Geo. 3. c. 67	Shipping Offences Act 1793	The whole act.
57 Geo. 3. c. 19	Seditious Meetings Act 1817	The whole act.
5 Geo. 4. c. 83	Vagrancy Act 1824	In section 4, the words from "every person being armed" to "arrestable offence" and from "and every such gun" to the end.
2 & 3 Vict. c. 47	Metropolitan Police Act 1839	In section 54, paragraph 13.
2 & 3 Vict. c. xciv	City of London Police Act 1839	In section 35, paragraph 13.
3 Edw. 7. c. ccl	Erith Tramways and Improvement Act 1903	Section 171.
1 Edw. 8 & 1 Geo. 6. c. 6	Public Order Act 1936	Section 3. Section 4. Section 5. Section 5A. In section 7, in subsection (2) the words "or section 5 or 5A" and in subsection (3) the words ", four or five". Section 8(6). In section 9, in subsection (1) the definition of "public procession" and in subsection (3) the words "by the council of any borough or district or".
7 & 8 Geo. 6. c. xxi	Middlesex County Council Act 1944	Section 309.
1967 c. 58	Criminal Law Act 1967	Section 11(3). In schedule 2, paragraph 2(1)(b).
1968 c. 54	Theatres Act 1968	Section 5. In sections 7(2), 8, 9(1), 10(1)(a) and (b), 15(1)(a) and 18(2), the references to section 5.
1976 c. 74	Race Relations Act 1976	Section 70. Section 79(6).
1976 c. xxxv	County of South Glamorgan Act 1976	Section 25. In part I of schedule 3, the entry relating to section 25.
1980 c. 62	Criminal Justice (Scotland) Act 1980	In section 75(e)(i), the word "or" at the end.
1980 c. x	County of Merseyside Act 1980	In section 30(2), paragraph (b), the word "and" preceding that paragraph and the words from "and may make" to the end. In section 30(5), the words "in the said section 31 or". Section 31. In section 137(2), the reference to section 31.
1980 c. xi	West Midlands County Council Act 1980	Section 38, except subsection (4). In section 116(2), the reference to section 38.
1980 c. xiii	Cheshire County Council Act 1980	Section 28, except subsection (4). In section 108(2), the reference to section 28.
1980 c. xv	Isle of Wight Act 1980	Section 26, except subsection (4). In section 63(2), the reference to section 26.
1981 c. ix	Greater Manchester Act 1981	Section 56, except subsection (4). In section 179(2), the reference to section 56.
1981 c. xxv	East Sussex Act 1981	Section 29. In section 102(2), the reference to section 29.
1982 c. 45	Civic Government (Scotland) Act 1982	Section 62(10). In section 63(3)(a)(i), the word "or" at the end. In section 66, in paragraph (a), the words "or that order", and in paragraph (b) the words "or order under the said section 3".
1982 c. 48	Criminal Justice Act 1982	In part I of schedule 1, the entries relating to riot and affray.
1984 c. 46	Cable and Broadcasting Act 1984	Section 27. In section 33(2), the words "an offence under section 27 above or".
1984 c. 60	Police and Criminal Evidence Act 1984	In section 17(1)(c)(i) the words from "4" to "peace)".
1985 c. 57	Sporting Events (Control of Alcohol etc.) Act 1985	In section 8, the word "and" at the end of paragraph (b).

== The act and Article 11 of ECHR ==
The act should be considered in connection with Article 11 of European Convention on Human Rights, which grants people the rights of (peaceful) assembly and freedom of association with others. Articles 10 and 11 together protect the right to peaceful protest. The House of Commons Library notes that these rights are not absolute and that the Public Order Act 1986 allows the police to impose restrictions and conditions on protests to maintain public order or protect the rights and freedoms of others.

== Controversies ==
=== Misuse of section 14 ===
The UK police have been accused by protestors and journalists of misusing the powers in section 14 on several occasions. During the 2009 G-20 London summit protests journalists were forced to leave the protests by police who threatened them with arrest.

=== The campaign to reform section 5 ===
The "Reform Section 5" campaign was established in May 2012 to garner support for an alteration of section 5, and led to an increase in the threshold from "abusive or insulting" to strictly "abusive" for speech restricted by the act. It was reported that under section 5 alone, 51,285 people were convicted between 2001 and 2003, 8,489 of whom were between 10 and 17 years of age.

The campaign was supported by a range of groups and famous individuals. These included the National Secular Society, the Christian Institute, the Bow Group, Big Brother Watch, the Peter Tatchell Foundation and The Freedom Association. Actors Rowan Atkinson and Stephen Fry also voiced their support.

In 2013, a House of Lords amendment to a forthcoming Crime and Court Bill meant the removal of "insulting" from the definition of section 5 of the Public Order Act 1986. A subsequent House of Commons briefing paper acknowledged the government's acceptance of the amendment and detailed the reasons for its decision.

== Amendments ==
In 2021 the government published the Police, Crime, Sentencing and Courts Bill which would amend and strengthen the Public Order Act 1986 in certain ways, including widening the restrictions police can place on protests and demonstrations, impose conditions on one-person protests, and define what is meant by protests causing "serious disruption" to wider communities.

These amendments were enacted by the Police, Crime, Sentencing and Courts Act 2022 including new sections 12(12) and 14(11) giving the Home Secretary the power to make regulations defining the meaning of phrases in the act, a so-called Henry VIII power.

In May 2025, the Court of Appeal ruled that two regulations issued under this amendment were not lawful, in that defining certain powers under the act to apply to "more than minor" disruption in protests was incompatible with the act's "serious disruption" requirement.

== See also ==
- Public Order Act 2023
- Public Order Act
- 2009 G20 London summit protests § Policing
- Riot Act
- Public Order Bill
