= Police Act 1997 =

Act of the Parliament of the United Kingdom

Police Act 1997 (Note: Section 138.)
- Act of Parliament
- Parliament of the United Kingdom
- Long title: An Act to make provision for the National Criminal Intelligence Service and the National Crime Squad; to make provision about entry on and interference with property and with wireless telegraphy in the course of the prevention or detection of serious crime; to make provision for the Police Information Technology Organisation; to provide for the issue of certificates about criminal records; to make provision about the administration and organisation of the police; to repeal certain enactments about rehabilitation of offenders; and for connected purposes.
- Citation: 1997 c. 50
- Territorial extent: United Kingdom (Note: Section 137.)

Dates
- Royal assent: 21 March 1997
- Commencement: Various (Note: Section 135.)
Other legislation
Amends	Explosives Act 1875; Law Reform (Miscellaneous Provisions) (Scotland) Act 1980; Housing Associations Act 1985; Town and Country Planning Act 1990; Police Act 1996; Employment Rights Act 1996
Amended by	Audit Commission Act 1998; Crime and Disorder Act 1998; Regulation of Investigatory Powers Act 2000; Football (Disorder) Act 2000; Criminal Justice and Police Act 2001; Smoking, Health and Social Care (Scotland) Act 2005; National Lottery Act 2006; Safeguarding Vulnerable Groups Act 2006; Investigatory Powers Act 2016; Policing and Crime Act 2017; Space Industry Act 2018; Sentencing Act 2020

Status: Amended

Text of statute as originally enacted

Text of the Police Act 1997 as in force today (including any amendments) within the United Kingdom, from legislation.gov.uk.

The Police Act 1997 (c. 50) is an act of the Parliament of the United Kingdom passed on 21 March 1997. Its main purposes are:

- to make provision for the National Criminal Intelligence Service (NCIS) and the National Crime Squad;
- to make provision about entry onto, and interference with, property and with wireless telegraphy for the prevention or detection of serious crime;
- to make provision for the Police Information Technology Organisation;
- to provide for the issue of criminal record certificates;
- to address aspects of the administration and organisation of the police; and
- to repeal certain legislation relating to the rehabilitation of offenders.

The case of R v Khan (1996), which was heard by the House of Lords, was one on the factors leading to the regulation of police powers embodied in this legislation.

The function of the NCIS was to gather and analyse intelligence data in order to provide insight and intelligence to national police forces. Its role was later taken over by the Serious Organised Crime Agency.

The Criminal Records Bureau, now known as the Disclosure and Barring Service, was established under Part V of the Police Act 1997 and was launched in March 2002.
