= Football (Offences) Act 1991 =

Act of the Parliament of the United Kingdom

Football (Offences) Act 1991 (Note: Section 6(1).)
- Act of Parliament
- Parliament of the United Kingdom
- Long title: An Act to make further provision with respect to disorderly conduct by persons attending football matches; and for connected purposes.
- Citation: 1991 c. 19
- Territorial extent: England and Wales (Note: Section 6(3).)

Dates
- Royal assent: 27 June 1991
- Commencement: 10 August 1991 (Note: Section 6(2). The Football (Offences) Act 1991 (Commencement) Order 1991)

Other legislation
- Amends: Police and Criminal Evidence Act 1984; Football Spectators Act 1989
- Amended by: Football (Offences and Disorder) Act 1999; Football (Disorder) Act 2000; Serious Organised Crime and Police Act 2005; Unauthorised Entry to Football Matches Act 2026

Status: Amended

Text of statute as originally enacted

Revised text of statute as amended

Text of the Football (Offences) Act 1991 as in force today (including any amendments) within the United Kingdom, from legislation.gov.uk.

The Football Offences Act 1991 (c. 19) is an act of the Parliament of the United Kingdom signed into law on 27 June 1991. Its creation was intended to curb "disorderly conduct", otherwise known as football hooliganism. It banned the throwing of missiles, indecent and racist chants, and pitch invasions (among other "disorderly conduct").

At the end of the 2021–2022 season, there were several pitch invasions, which led clubs to be more rigorous in seeking prosecutions under the act, which previously had not been stringently enforced. Prosecution will now be considered the "default response."
