= Probation Service Act 1993 =

Act of the Parliament of the United Kingdom

Probation Service Act 1993 (Note: Section 33(1).)
- Act of Parliament
- Parliament of the United Kingdom
- Long title: An Act to consolidate certain enactments relating to the probation service and its functions and to arrangements for persons on bail and the rehabilitation of offenders, with amendments to give effect to recommendations of the Law Commission.
- Citation: 1993 c. 47
- Territorial extent: England and Wales (Note: Section 33(3).)

Dates
- Royal assent: 5 November 1993
- Commencement: 5 February 1994 (Note: Section 33(2).)
- Repealed: 1 April 2001 (Note: The Criminal Justice and Court Services Act 2000 (Commencement No. 4) Order 2001. (SI 2001/919).)

Other legislation
- Amends: See § Repealed enactments
- Repeals/revokes: See § Repealed enactments
- Amended by: Audit Commission Act 1998; Crime and Disorder Act 1998; Powers of Criminal Courts (Sentencing) Act 2000
- Repealed by: Criminal Justice and Court Services Act 2000

Status: Repealed

Text of statute as originally enacted

Revised text of statute as amended

The Probation Service Act 1993 (c. 47) was an act of the Parliament of the United Kingdom that consolidated enactments related to the probation service and its functions, and to arrangements for persons on bail and the rehabilitation of offenders, in England and Wales.

== Provisions ==
=== Repealed enactments ===
Section 32(3) of the act repealed 9 enactments, listed in schedule 4 to the act.

Citation	Short title	Extent of repeal
1971 c. 23	Courts Act 1971	In section 53, in subsection (6), the words "subsection (2)" and "probation and after care committee" and, in subsection (7), paragraph (a).
1973 c. 62	Powers of Criminal Courts Act 1973	Section 47.
1973 c. 62	Powers of Criminal Courts Act 1973	Section 49.
1973 c. 62	Powers of Criminal Courts Act 1973	In section 51, in subsection (1), paragraph (a) and subsections (2) to (8).
1973 c. 62	Powers of Criminal Courts Act 1973	In section 54, in subsection (3), the words "to rules under section 49 of this Act nor" and "or paragraph 1 of Schedule 3 to" and, in subsection (4), the words from "and an order" to the end.
1973 c. 62	Powers of Criminal Courts Act 1973	Schedule 3.
1973 c. 62	Powers of Criminal Courts Act 1973	In Schedule 4, paragraph 2.
1973 c. 62	Powers of Criminal Courts Act 1973	In Schedule 5, paragraphs 10, 14, 35, 36, 37, 38 and 41.
1974 c. 23	Juries Act 1974	In Schedule 1, in Group B of Part I, the words "probation home".
1977 c. 45	Criminal Law Act 1977	In Schedule 12, in the entry relating to the Powers of Criminal Courts Act 1973, paragraphs 6, 7, 8, 9 and 11.
1982 c. 48	Criminal Justice Act 1982	Section 65.
1982 c. 48	Criminal Justice Act 1982	Schedule 11.
1982 c. 48	Criminal Justice Act 1982	In Schedule 17, paragraphs 16 and 17.
1985 c. 51	Local Government Act 1985	Section 15.
1988 c. 33	Criminal Justice Act 1988	Section 132.
1988 c. 33	Criminal Justice Act 1988	Schedule 11.
1988 c. 33	Criminal Justice Act 1988	In Schedule 15, paragraphs 42 and 105.
1989 c. 41	Children Act 1989	In Schedule 13, paragraph 34.
1991 c. 53	Criminal Justice Act 1991	In section 15, in subsection (1), paragraphs (a) and (b), subsection (2) and subsection (4).
1991 c. 53	Criminal Justice Act 1991	Sections 73 to 75.
1991 c. 53	Criminal Justice Act 1991	Section 94.
1991 c. 53	Criminal Justice Act 1991	Sections 96 and 97.
1991 c. 53	Criminal Justice Act 1991	In section 98(a), the words from "or payments" to the end.
1991 c. 53	Criminal Justice Act 1991	In Schedule 11, paragraph 17.

== Subsequent developments ==
The whole act was repealed by section 75 of, and schedule 8 to, the Criminal Justice and Court Services Act 2000, which came into force on 1 April 2001. (Note: The Criminal Justice and Court Services Act 2000 (Commencement No. 4) Order 2001 (SI 2001/919).)
