= Criminal Justice Act 1991 =

Act of the Parliament of the United Kingdom

Criminal Justice Act 1991 (Note: Section 120(1).)
- Act of Parliament
- Parliament of the United Kingdom
- Long title: An Act to make further provision with respect to the treatment of offenders and the position of children and young persons and persons having responsibility for them; to make provision with respect to certain services provided or proposed to be provided for purposes connected with the administration of justice or the treatment of offenders; to make financial and other provision with respect to that administration; and for connected purposes.
- Citation: 1991 c. 53
- Introduced by: Kenneth Baker (Lords)
- Territorial extent: England and Wales (Note: Section 120(4), but see 120(5)–(8).)

Dates
- Royal assent: 25 July 1991
- Commencement: various (Note: Section 120(2)–(3).)
Other legislation
Amends	Metropolitan Police Act 1839; Administration of Justice (Miscellaneous Provisions) Act 1933; Theft Act 1968; Attachment of Earnings Act 1971; Bail Act 1976
Amended by	Protection of Badgers Act 1992; Criminal Justice Act 1993; Probation Service Act 1993; Vehicle Excise and Registration Act 1994; Criminal Procedure (Consequential Provisions) (Scotland) Act 1995; Justices of the Peace Act 1997; Crime and Disorder Act 1998; Youth Justice and Criminal Evidence Act 1999; Powers of Criminal Courts (Sentencing) Act 2000; Sexual Offences (Amendment) Act 2000; Criminal Justice Act 2003; Domestic Violence, Crime and Victims Act 2004; Violent Crime Reduction Act 2006; Statute Law (Repeals) Act 2008; Criminal Justice and Courts Act 2015; Modern Slavery Act 2015; Sentencing Act 2020

Status: Amended

Text of statute as originally enacted

Revised text of statute as amended

Text of the Criminal Justice Act 1991 as in force today (including any amendments) within the United Kingdom, from legislation.gov.uk.

The Criminal Justice Act 1991 (c. 53) is an act of the Parliament of the United Kingdom. Most of it only applies to England and Wales, with certain clauses extended to either Northern Ireland or Scotland. The Act enabled the introduction of private prisons to the United Kingdom, attempted to reform the system of fines in England and Wales, established HM Inspectorate of Probation as a statutory body, and allowed for the Home Secretary to release foreign prisoners from prison to enable their deportation.

As of 2025, the act remains in force with many of its provisions amended by subsequent Criminal Justice Acts.

== History ==
The Conservative MP John Greenway attempted to have the Act amended during its passage to introduce the death penalty for the murder of a police officer.

== Provisions ==
=== Early Removal Scheme ===
The Act mode provision for an Early Removal Scheme. Under the Scheme, the Home Secretary can release foreign national prisoners early from prison where they were subject to deportation or administrative removal. The Scheme is currently regulated by the Criminal Justice Act 2003 and was modified in 2008 by Statutory Instrument to reduce the qualifying period before a prisoner could be released for deportation.

=== Prisoner custody officers ===
The Act also defined the position of a Prisoner Custody Officer, a person employed by a private contractor to transport prisoners and detained person between custodial establishments and escort them around courts.

=== Unit fines ===
Section 18 made provision for fines to be imposed using a mathematical formula that took into account the seriousness of the crime and the offenders ability to pay. This was subject to criticism from magistrates and others for imposing significant fines on wealthier individuals for minor offences, and insignificant fines on poorer individuals for more serious offences. Eventually, Kenneth Clarke introduced the Criminal Justice Act 1993 to remove the system of unit fines.

=== Drug rehabilitation ===
Schedule 1A6 made provision for attendance at drug treatment for an offender on probation who suffered from alcohol or drug dependence.

=== HM Inspectorate of Probation ===
Section 73 placed HM Inspectorate of Probation on a statutory footing.

=== Private prisons ===
Sections 84 to 88 made it possible for the establishment of private prisons in England and Wales. Subsequently, HM Prison Wolds opened as the first privately managed prison in the UK in 1992.
