= Powers of Criminal Courts (Sentencing) Act 2000 =

Act of the Parliament of the United Kingdom

Powers of Criminal Courts (Sentencing) Act 2000 (Note: Section 166.)
- Act of Parliament
- Parliament of the United Kingdom
- Long title: An Act to consolidate certain enactments relating to the powers of courts to deal with offenders and defaulters and to the treatment of such persons, with amendments to give effect to recommendations of the Law Commission and the Scottish Law Commission.
- Citation: 2000 c. 6
- Introduced by: Jack Straw (Commons)
- Territorial extent: England and Wales; Scotland (in part); Northern Ireland (in part); (Note: Section 167.)

Dates
- Royal assent: 25 May 2000
- Commencement: 25 August 2000 (Note: Section 168(1).)
Other legislation
Amends	Criminal Justice Act 1967; Theft Act 1968; Bail Act 1976; Senior Courts Act 1981; Social Security Administration Act 1992; See § Repealed enactments
Repeals/revokes	See § Repealed enactments
Amended by	Football (Disorder) Act 2000; Criminal Justice and Court Services Act 2000; Armed Forces Act 2001; Anti-terrorism, Crime and Security Act 2001; Crime (International Co-operation) Act 2003; Anti-social Behaviour Act 2003; Courts Act 2003; Criminal Justice Act 2003; Children Act 2004; Constitutional Reform Act 2005; Criminal Defence Service Act 2006; Wireless Telegraphy Act 2006; Police and Justice Act 2006; Armed Forces Act 2006; Criminal Justice and Immigration Act 2008; Children and Young Persons Act 2008; Coroners and Justice Act 2009; Crime and Courts Act 2013; Anti-social Behaviour, Crime and Policing Act 2014; Counter-Terrorism and Border Security Act 2019; Offensive Weapons Act 2019; Sentencing (Pre-consolidation Amendments) Act 2020; Sentencing Act 2020; Counter-Terrorism and Sentencing Act 2021

Status: Partially repealed

Text of statute as originally enacted

Revised text of statute as amended

The Powers of Criminal Courts (Sentencing) Act 2000 (c. 6) is an act of the Parliament of the United Kingdom that consolidated enactments relating to sentencing treatment of offenders and defaulters.

== Provisions ==
The act brings together parts of several other acts dealing with the sentencing treatment of offenders and defaulters. It was drafted by the Law Commission and the Scottish Law Commission.

With amendments, it consolidated sentencing legislation previously spread across twelve separate Acts. Much of the Act has been repealed by the Criminal Justice Act 2003, which introduced significant changes to sentencing from 2005, Most of the rest was replaced by the Sentencing Act 2020.

The act reduced the conditions before custodial orders can be imposed on children. The act allowed a Crown Court to sentence young people found guilty of certain offences. The act allows judges to resentence individuals if fresh information becomes apparent.

=== Repealed enactments ===
Section 165(4) of the act repealed 36 enactments and revoked 5 instruments, listed in parts I and II of schedule 12 to the act, respectively.

==== Part I — Acts of Parliament repealed ====
Citation	Short title	Extent of repeal
23 Geo. 5. c. 12	Children and Young Persons Act 1933	Section 53. Sections 55 and 56. In section 106, in subsection (1), the words from "or, in the case" to "officer", and subsection (2).
9 & 10 Eliz. 2. c. 39	Criminal Justice Act 1961	In Schedule 4, the entry relating to section 53 of the Children and Young Persons Act 1933.
1963 c. 37	Children and Young Persons Act 1963	In Schedule 3, paragraph 14.
1965 c. 71	Murder (Abolition of Death Penalty) Act 1965	In section 1, in subsection (1), the words ", subject to subsection (5) below," and subsection (5).
1967 c. 80	Criminal Justice Act 1967	Section 56.
1968 c. 60	Theft Act 1968	Section 28.
1969 c. 54	Children and Young Persons Act 1969	In section 7, subsections (7), (8), (8A), (8B) and (9). Sections 11 to 19. In section 70, in subsection (1), in the definition of "reside", the words from "except" to the end, and subsection (2). In Schedule 4, paragraph 12(3). In Schedule 5, paragraphs 6 and 11.
1971 c. 23	Courts Act 1971	In Schedule 9, in Part I, in the entry relating to the Children and Young Persons Act 1969, the word "16(8),".
1972 c. 71	Criminal Justice Act 1972	Section 6. In Schedule 5, the entries relating to the Theft Act 1968 and section 7(8) of the Children and Young Persons Act 1969.
1973 c. 62	Powers of Criminal Courts Act 1973	The whole act.
1977 c. 45	Criminal Law Act 1977	Section 46. Section 49. Section 57. In Schedule 12, the entry relating to the Theft Act 1968 and paragraphs 1 and 4 of the entry relating to the Powers of Criminal Courts Act 1973.
1979 c. 2	Customs and Excise Management Act 1979	In Schedule 4, in paragraph 12, in Part I of the Table, the entry relating to the Powers of Criminal Courts Act 1973.
1980 c. 43	Magistrates' Courts Act 1980	Sections 30 and 31. Section 36. Sections 38 to 40. In Schedule 6A, the entries relating to the Children and Young Persons Act 1969, the Powers of Criminal Courts Act 1973, the Criminal Justice Act 1982 and the Criminal Justice Act 1991. In Schedule 7, paragraphs 65, 67, 81, 82, 119 to 123, 143, 144 and 146.
1981 c. 54	Supreme Court Act 1981	Section 47. In section 81(1)(g), sub-paragraph (iv) and the word "or" immediately preceding it.
1981 c. 56	Transport Act 1981	In Schedule 9, Part II.
1982 c. 48	Criminal Justice Act 1982	Section 1(1), (2), (5) and (5A). Section 1A. Section 1C. Section 3. Sections 8 and 9. Sections 12 and 13. Sections 16 to 21. Section 26. Section 63. Section 67. Section 69(1). In Schedule 12, paragraph 1. In Schedule 14, paragraphs 4, 9, 33, 48 and 51. In Schedule 17, paragraph 1(2).
1988 c. 33	Criminal Justice Act 1988	Section 42. Section 60(2). Section 69. Sections 104 and 105. Section 107. Section 123(4). Sections 127 to 129. Section 163. In Schedule 8, paragraph 11(2). Schedule 10. In Schedule 15, paragraphs 33, 38, 39, 41, 52 and 79.
1988 c. 54	Road Traffic (Consequential Provisions) Act 1988	In Schedule 3, paragraphs 3, 11 and 20.
1989 c. 41	Children Act 1989	In Schedule 12, paragraphs 22 and 23, and, in paragraph 29, paragraph (b) and the word "and" immediately preceding it.
1990 c. 41	Courts and Legal Services Act 1990	In Schedule 16, paragraphs 4 and 5.
1991 c. 40	Road Traffic Act 1991	Section 36. Section 38.
1991 c. 53	Criminal Justice Act 1991	Sections 1 to 15. In section 16, paragraph (a). In section 17(2), in paragraph (a), the words from "and section 36(1)" to "court)", and, in paragraph (b), the words from "and section 36(2)" to "court)". Section 18. Section 20. Section 21. Section 25. Sections 28 and 29. In section 30(2), the words "(other than an order under section 12(4) above)". Section 31. Section 40. Section 44 as it applies to persons sentenced for sexual offences committed before 30th September 1998. In section 51(2B), paragraph (d) and the word "and" immediately preceding it. Sections 57 and 58. Section 63. Sections 66 and 67. In section 102, in subsection (5)(c), the words "paragraph 15 of Schedule 11 to this Act", and, in subsection (6), the words "paragraph 16 of Schedule 11 to this Act". Schedules 1 and 2. In Schedule 3, Part I. In Schedule 4, in Part I, the entries relating to section 27(3) of the Powers of Criminal Courts Act 1973 and section 40(1) of the Magistrates' Courts Act 1980. Schedule 7. In Schedule 8, in paragraph 6(1), paragraphs (c) and (d). In Schedule 11, paragraphs 4 to 8, 12, 13, 15, 16, 19, 20(a), 21, 26, 30 to 34, 38 and 39 and, in paragraph 40(2), in paragraph (a), the word ", 56", in paragraph (g), the words "7," and "15, 16,", paragraph (i), and, in paragraph (o), the words "section 16(2) and". In Schedule 12, paragraphs 1 to 6, 8(3), 14, 17, 20 and 21.
1991 c. 62	Armed Forces Act 1991	In Schedule 2, paragraph 9(1).
1993 c. 36	Criminal Justice Act 1993	Section 65(1). Section 66. In Schedule 3, paragraphs 2, 3, 5 and 6(1), (2), (6) and (7).
1993 c. 47	Probation Service Act 1993	In Schedule 3, paragraphs 3(2) and 10.
1994 c. 33	Criminal Justice and Public Order Act 1994	Section 16. Section 18(1) and (2). Section 48. In Schedule 9, paragraphs 10, 15, 16, 21, 40 to 42, 44, 45, 47 and 50. In Schedule 10, paragraphs 4, 5, 49 and 65 to 67.
1994 c. 39	Local Government etc. (Scotland) Act 1994	In Schedule 13, paragraph 173.
1995 c. 40	Criminal Procedure (Consequential Provisions) (Scotland) Act 1995	In Schedule 4, paragraph 80(3).
1996 c. 25	Criminal Procedure and Investigations Act 1996	In Schedule 1, paragraph 20.
1996 c. 56	Education Act 1996	In Schedule 37, paragraphs 15 and 16.
1997 c. 25	Justices of the Peace Act 1997	In Schedule 5, paragraph 15.
1997 c. 30	Police (Property) Act 1997	Section 2. Section 7(3)(b).
1997 c. 43	Crime (Sentences) Act 1997	Part I. Sections 9 and 9A. Sections 36 to 39. Sections 43 and 44. Sections 50 and 51. Section 55(2)(a). In Schedule 4, paragraphs 5(1), 8, 15(1) to (9) and (11) to (13) and 17.
1998 c. 37	Crime and Disorder Act 1998	In section 47(1), paragraph (b) and the word "or" immediately preceding it, and the words "or, as the case may be, for sentence". Section 58. Sections 61 to 64. Sections 67 to 79. Section 82. Section 85. Section 102. Section 107(3) to (5). Section 121(6)(f). Schedules 4 and 5. In Schedule 7, paragraphs 1 to 7, 13 to 16, 18 to 31, 33 to 38, 40 to 49, 50(2) to (5), 51 and 52. In Schedule 8, paragraphs 2, 3, 4, 9, 10, 16 to 21, 25 to 34, 46, 47, 49 to 53, 72 to 78, 85, 92, 96, 109, 112 and 132(2) and (3). In Schedule 9, paragraphs 3 and 4.
1999 c. 22	Access to Justice Act 1999	Section 58(1) and (6). Section 66. In Schedule 4, paragraphs 5, 9, 24 and 25. Schedule 9. In Schedule 13, paragraphs 11(b) and (c), 63, 83 to 85, 123 and 166.
1999 c. 23	Youth Justice and Criminal Evidence Act 1999	Sections 1 to 15. In section 64, the words "regulations or", wherever occurring, and, in subsection (2), the words "6(4) or", and, in subsection (3), the word "2(3)," and paragraph (b) and the word "or" immediately preceding that paragraph. Section 67(2). Section 68(7). Schedule 1. In Schedule 4, paragraphs 5, 20, 29 and 30. Schedule 5. In Schedule 7, paragraph 2.

==== Part II — Subordinate legislation revoked ====
S.I. number	Title	Extent of revocation
S.I. 1990/144	Driving Licences (Community Driving Licence) Regulations 1990	In Schedule 4, paragraph 2.
S.I. 1996/1974	Driving Licences (Community Driving Licence) Regulations 1996	In Schedule 4, paragraph 1.
S.I. 1996/3161	Criminal Justice (Northern Ireland Consequential Amendments) Order 1996	In Article 2, paragraphs (a) to (c).
S.I. 2000/90	Health Act 1999 (Supplementary, Consequential etc. Provisions) Order 2000	In Schedule 2, paragraph 3.
S.I. 2000/694	Health Act 1999 (Supplementary, Consequential etc. Provisions) (No. 2) Order 2000	In the Schedule, paragraph 1.
