= Football Spectators Act 1989 =

Act of the Parliament of the United Kingdom

Football Spectators Act 1989 (Note: Section 27(1).)
- Act of Parliament
- Parliament of the United Kingdom
- Long title: An Act to control the admission of spectators at designated football matches in England and Wales by means of a national membership scheme and licences to admit spectators; to provide for the safety of spectators at such matches by means of such licences and the conferment of functions on the licensing authority in relation to safety certificates for grounds at which such matches are played; and to provide for the making by courts and the enforcement of orders imposing restrictions on persons convicted of certain offences for the purpose of preventing violence or disorder at or in connection with designated football matches played outside England and Wales.
- Citation: 1989 c. 37
- Territorial extent: England and Wales (Note: Section 27(6).)

Dates
- Royal assent: 16 November 1989
- Commencement: various (Note: Section 27(2)–(4).)
Other legislation
Amends	Criminal Appeal Act 1968; Magistrates' Courts Act 1980
Amended by	Football (Offences) Act 1991; Crime and Disorder Act 1998; Football (Offences and Disorder) Act 1999; Football (Disorder) Act 2000; Anti-social Behaviour Act 2003; Courts Act 2003; Fire and Rescue Services Act 2004; Identity Cards Act 2006; Violent Crime Reduction Act 2006; Serious Crime Act 2007; Criminal Justice and Immigration Act 2008; Policing and Crime Act 2009; Identity Documents Act 2010; Sports Grounds Safety Authority Act 2011; Legal Aid, Sentencing and Punishment of Offenders Act 2012; Sentencing Act 2020; Police, Crime, Sentencing and Courts Act 2022; Football Spectators (Relevant Offences) Regulations 2022; Online Safety Act 2023

Status: Amended

Text of statute as originally enacted

Revised text of statute as amended

Text of the Football Spectators Act 1989 as in force today (including any amendments) within the United Kingdom, from legislation.gov.uk.

The Football Spectators Act 1989 (c. 37) is an act of the Parliament of the United Kingdom enacted during the premiership of Margaret Thatcher. Its provisions apply primarily to football matches played in England and Wales. Amendments to the act were made through the Football (Offences and Disorder) Act 1999, the Football (Disorder) Act 2000, and the Violent Crime Reduction Act 2006, the last of which repealed large sections of the Football Spectators Act 1989.

The aim of the act was to identify individuals known to cause disorder at and around football matches, whether in the UK itself or abroad. It was originally intended that fans would have to give a passport number to become part of a membership scheme and receive an identity card so as to go to away matches, but eventually this was not enacted.

== Football-related offences ==
The act and its amendments identifies a number of specific offences related to fan behaviour, including the throwing of objects onto the field or into the crowd; racist or obscene chanting at a match; violence against persons or property, including threats and endangerment of any person's life; a variety of alcohol-related offences; and the bringing or being in possession of fireworks into or at a designated sporting event. However, almost any criminal offence connected with a game that occurs within 24 hours on either end of a football match can also be designated as a football-related offence.

The act also introduced the football banning order (FBO), under which a magistrate can ban an individual from attending football matches (whether either domestic or foreign) for a period of 2–10 years and can also impose additional restrictions. FBOs are usually imposed by the court after someone has been convicted of a football-related offence, although they can be imposed even on individuals charged but acquitted of such offences, or in response to police representations that the FBO would prevent football-related violence or disorder.

== See also ==
- Football hooliganism in the United Kingdom
