= Criminal Justice Act 1967 =

Act of the Parliament of the United Kingdom

Criminal Justice Act 1967 (Note: Section 106(1).)
- Act of Parliament
- Parliament of the United Kingdom
- Long title: An Act to amend the law relating to the proceedings of criminal courts, including the law relating to evidence, and to the qualification of jurors, in such proceedings and to appeals in criminal cases; to reform existing methods and provide new methods of dealing with offenders; to make further provision for the treatment of offenders, the management of prisons and other institutions and the arrest of offenders unlawfully at large; to make further provision with respect to legal aid and advice in criminal proceedings; to amend the law relating to firearms and ammunition; to alter the penalties which may be imposed for certain offences; and for connected purposes.
- Citation: 1967 c. 80
- Territorial extent: England and Wales; Scotland (in part); Northern Ireland (in part); Channel Islands (in part); Isle of Man (in part); (Note: Section 106(2)–(4).)

Dates
- Royal assent: 27 July 1967
- Commencement: various (Note: Section 106(5).)
Other legislation
Amends	London Hackney Carriages Act 1843
Amended by	Criminal Appeal Act 1968; Courts Act 1971; Criminal Justice Act 1972; Powers of Criminal Courts Act 1973; Statute Law (Repeals) Act 1977; Criminal Law Act 1977; Customs and Excise Management Act 1979; Magistrates Courts Act 1980; Criminal Justice Act 1982; Powers of Criminal Courts (Sentencing) Act 2000

Status: Amended

Text of statute as originally enacted

Revised text of statute as amended

Text of the Criminal Justice Act 1967 as in force today (including any amendments) within the United Kingdom, from legislation.gov.uk.

The Criminal Justice Act 1967 (c. 80) is an act of the Parliament of the United Kingdom.

Section 9 allows uncontroversial witness statements to be read in court instead of having to call the witness to give live testimony in the courtroom, if it will not be necessary to challenge their evidence in cross-examination. The rule in section 9 was not new in 1967; it was a re-enactment of a law which had previously appeared in the Criminal Justice Act 1925 and the Criminal Justice Act 1948.

Section 13 removed the requirement for unanimous verdicts and permitted majority verdicts for juries in England and Wales. (This section was repealed and replaced by the Juries Act 1974.)

Sections 39 to 42 introduced the ability for courts to suspend a sentence.

Section 89 makes it an offence to lie in a witness statement (since perjury only applies to lies told in court).

== See also ==
- Criminal Justice Act

== Bibliography ==
- "Criminal Justice Act 1967". Halsbury's Statutes of England and Wales. Fourth Edition. LexisNexis. 2010 Reissue. Volume 11(1). Page 429. 2008 Reissue. Volume 12(1). Page 451.
- John Burke (ed). "Criminal Justice Act 1967". Current Law Statutes Annotated 1967. Sweet & Maxwell. Stevens & Sons. London. W Green & Son. Edinburgh. 1967. Chapter 80. Google Books.
- Brian Harris. "A Short Guide to the Criminal Justice Act 1967." Justice of the Peace Ltd. 1968. Reviewed at 41 Police Journal 128.
