= Criminal Justice Act 1972 =

Act of the Parliament of the United Kingdom

Criminal Justice Act 1972 (Note: Section 66(1).)
- Act of Parliament
- Parliament of the United Kingdom
- Long title: An Act to make further provision with respect to the administration of criminal justice, the criminal courts and the penal system, and to the methods of dealing with offenders (including the provision of new methods); to amend the law about qualification for jury service, the summoning of jurors and the payment of allowances in respect of jury service; to increase the penalties for certain offences and amend section 21 of the Firearms Act 1968 and section 9 of the Public Order Act 1936; and for purposes connected with those matters.
- Citation: 1972 c. 71
- Territorial extent: England and Wales (Note: Section 66(4). Certain specified provisions also extend to Scotland, Northern Ireland, the Channel Islands and the Isle of Man.)

Dates
- Royal assent: 26 October 1972
- Commencement: 1 January 1973 (various provisions) (Note: Section 66(3). The act's provisions were brought into force by commencement orders made under that section; the first tranche of provisions came into force on 1 January 1973 by virtue of the Criminal Justice Act 1972 (Commencement No. 1) Order 1972 (SI 1972/1763).)

Other legislation
- Amends: See § Repealed enactments
- Repeals/revokes: See § Repealed enactments
- Amended by: Statute Law (Repeals) Act 1977; Criminal Justice and Public Order Act 1994; Criminal Procedure and Investigations Act 1996; Justices of the Peace Act 1997; Crime and Disorder Act 1998; Courts Act 2003; Sexual Offences Act 2003; Criminal Justice Act 2003; Constitutional Reform Act 2005; Road Safety Act 2006; Armed Forces Act 2006; Tribunals, Courts and Enforcement Act 2007; Statute Law (Repeals) Act 2008; Transfer of Tribunal Functions (Lands Tribunal and Miscellaneous Amendments) Order 2009; Legal Aid, Sentencing and Punishment of Offenders Act 2012; Housing and Planning Act 2016; Courts and Tribunals (Judiciary and Functions of Staff) Act 2018

Status: Partially repealed

Text of statute as originally enacted

Revised text of statute as amended

Text of the Criminal Justice Act 1972 as in force today (including any amendments) within the United Kingdom, from legislation.gov.uk.

The Criminal Justice Act 1972 (c. 71) is an act of the Parliament of the United Kingdom that made further provision for the administration of criminal justice, the criminal courts and the penal system in England and Wales, including new methods of dealing with offenders such as compensation orders and criminal bankruptcy orders.

== Provisions ==
The act introduced compensation orders, enabling courts to require convicted persons to pay compensation for personal injury, loss or damage resulting from an offence, and restitution orders in respect of stolen property. It also introduced criminal bankruptcy orders, empowering the Crown Court to make a bankruptcy order against an offender where loss or damage exceeding a specified amount had resulted from the offence. Section 36 introduced the procedure whereby the Attorney General may refer a point of law to the Court of Appeal following an acquittal on indictment, a mechanism that remains in current use as the "Attorney General's Reference" procedure. The act also amended the law on jury service, increased penalties for certain firearms and public order offences, and made minor and consequential amendments to earlier enactments.

=== Repealed enactments ===
Section 64(2) of the act repealed 66 enactments, listed in parts I and II of schedule 6 to the act.

==== Part I: Juries ====
Part I — Juries
Citation	Short title	Extent of repeal
31 Geo. 3. c. 32	Roman Catholic Relief Act 1791	In section 8 the words "from serving upon any jury or".
6 Geo. 4. c. 50	Juries Act 1825	Sections 1, 27 and 50.
33 & 34 Vict. c. 77	Juries Act 1870	Sections 4, 5, 7 to 10, 25 and the Schedule.
53 & 54 Vict. c. 21	Inland Revenue Regulation Act 1890	In section 8, the words "or on any jury or inquest whatsoever".
53 & 54 Vict. c. ccxliii	London County Council (General Powers) Act 1890	Section 26.
7 Edw. 7. c. cxl	City of London (Union of Parishes) Act 1907	Section 26.
9 & 10 Geo. 5. c. 71	Sex Disqualification (Removal) Act 1919	In section 1 the words "and a person shall not be exempted by sex or marriage from the liability to serve as a juror".
9 & 10 Geo. 5. c. 71	Sex Disqualification (Removal) Act 1919	In section 4(2) the words from "and any enactment relating to juries" onwards.
9 & 10 Geo. 5. c. 92	Aliens Restriction (Amendment) Act 1919	Section 8.
12 & 13 Geo. 5. c. 11	Juries Act 1922	The whole act.
19 & 20 Geo. 5. c. 17	Local Government Act 1929	Section 79(1).
11 & 12 Geo. 6. c. 65	Representation of the People Act 1948	In Schedule 10, Part II, paragraph 7(2).
12, 13 & 14 Geo. 6. c. 86	Electoral Registers Act 1949	Section 3(1).
12, 13 & 14 Geo. 6. c. 86	Electoral Registers Act 1949	Schedule 2.
14 & 15 Geo. 6. c. 53	Midwives Act 1951	Section 22.
15 & 16 Geo. 6 & 1 Eliz. 2. c. 44	Customs and Excise Act 1952	In section 2(1) the words "or on any jury whatsoever".
1 & 2 Eliz. 2. c. 50	Auxiliary Forces Act 1953	In section 39(3) the words "and shall be exempt from serving on any jury" and the proviso.
2 & 3 Eliz. 2. c. 70	Mines and Quarries Act 1954	Section 144(5).
3 & 4 Eliz. 2. c. 18	Army Act 1955	Section 183.
3 & 4 Eliz. 2. c. 19	Air Force Act 1955	Section 183.
5 & 6 Eliz. 2. c. 28	Dentists Act 1957	In section 32, in subsection (1), the words "serving on all juries and inquests whatsoever and from"; subsection (2).
9 & 10 Eliz. 2. c. 34	Factories Act 1961	Section 145(5).
10 & 11 Eliz. 2. c. xlii	British Transport Commission Act 1962	Section 43(2).
1964 c. 42	Administration of Justice Act 1964	Section 21.
1964 c. 42	Administration of Justice Act 1964	Schedule 3 paragraph 13.
1964 c. 48	Police Act 1964	In Schedule 9, the entry relating to the Juries Act 1870.
1965 c. 16	Airports Authority Act 1965	Section 10(5).
1966 c. 36	Veterinary Surgeons Act 1966	Section 24(1).
1967 c. 80	Criminal Justice Act 1967	Sections 14 to 16.
1968 c. xxxii	Port of London Act 1968	Section 154(4).
1968 c. xxxii	Port of London Act 1968	In Schedule 2, Part I, paragraph 14.
1970 c. 9	Taxes Management Act 1970	Section 5(2).
1971 c. 23	Courts Act 1971	In section 31, in subsection (3), the words from "and in section 1" onwards; and subsection (7).
1971 c. 23	Courts Act 1971	Section 33(3).
1971 c. 23	Courts Act 1971	In Schedule 4, paragraphs 1 and 2.
1971 c. 23	Courts Act 1971	In Schedule 8, paragraphs 11 and 50.

==== Part II: Other Repeals ====
Part II — Other Repeals
Citation	Short title	Extent of repeal
33 & 34 Vict. c. 23	Forfeiture Act 1870	Section 4.
8 Edw. 7. c. 65	Summary Jurisdiction (Scotland) Act 1908	In section 77(4) the words "forty-four".
1 & 2 Geo. 5. c. 27	Protection of Animals Act 1911	Section 4.
16 & 17 Geo. 5. c. 60	Legitimacy Act 1926	In the Schedule, in paragraph 6 the words from "and any sum" onwards.
11 & 12 Geo. 6. c. 58	Criminal Justice Act 1948	Section 11(2).
11 & 12 Geo. 6. c. 58	Criminal Justice Act 1948	Section 14(2).
11 & 12 Geo. 6. c. 58	Criminal Justice Act 1948	In section 77(3), the proviso.
11 & 12 Geo. 6. c. 58	Criminal Justice Act 1948	In section 80(6) the word "damages".
11 & 12 Geo. 6. c. 58	Criminal Justice Act 1948	In Schedule 1, in paragraph (b) of the proviso to paragraph 3, the words "or to submit to treatment for his mental condition".
11 & 12 Geo. 6. c. 58	Criminal Justice Act 1948	In Schedule 5, in paragraph 2(1)(a), the words from "and, if the order so provides" onwards; paragraph 3(4); and in paragraph 3(6) the words "in individual cases".
12, 13 & 14 Geo. 6. c. 101	Justices of the Peace Act 1949	In section 27, in subsection (5) the words "and any question whether expenditure was properly incurred shall also be so determined"; and subsections (10)(a) and (11).
12, 13 & 14 Geo. 6. c. 101	Justices of the Peace Act 1949	Section 28.
15 & 16 Geo. 6 & 1 Eliz. 2. c. 48	Costs in Criminal Cases Act 1952	In section 17, in subsection (1) the definition of "prosecutor" and subsection (4).
15 & 16 Geo. 6 & 1 Eliz. 2. c. 52	Prison Act 1952	Section 38 except as provided in section 59 of this act.
15 & 16 Geo. 6. c. 55	Magistrates' Courts Act 1952	Section 34.
1 & 2 Eliz. 2. c. 20	Births and Deaths Registration Act 1953	Section 38(2).
2 & 3 Eliz. 2. c. 70	Mines and Quarries Act 1954	Section 167.
3 & 4 Eliz. 2. c. 18	Army Act 1955	Section 221.
3 & 4 Eliz. 2. c. 19	Air Force Act 1955	Section 219.
5 & 6 Eliz. 2. c. 53	Naval Discipline Act 1957	Section 100(3).
6 & 7 Eliz. 2. c. 31	First Offenders Act 1958	The whole act.
7 & 8 Eliz. 2. c. 22	County Courts Act 1959	Section 181.
8 & 9 Eliz. 2. c. 16	Road Traffic Act 1960	Section 247(1).
9 & 10 Eliz. 2. c. 15	Post Office Act 1961	Section 24(2).
9 & 10 Eliz. 2. c. 34	Factories Act 1961	In section 164(6) the words from the beginning to "Exchequer; and".
9 & 10 Eliz. 2. c. 39	Criminal Justice Act 1961	Section 8(4).
1963 c. 39	Criminal Justice (Scotland) Act 1963	In Schedule 5 the amendment of the First Offenders Act 1958.
1964 c. 42	Administration of Justice Act 1964	Section 22(2)(a).
1964 c. 42	Administration of Justice Act 1964	In Schedule 3, paragraph 19(4) and in paragraph 20(7) the words from "and in section 27(2)" onwards.
1965 c. 24	Severn Bridge Tolls Act 1965	Section 20(4).
1967 c. 10	Forestry Act 1967	Section 46(6).
1967 c. 58	Criminal Law Act 1967	In Schedule 2, paragraph 9.
1967 c. 76	Road Traffic Regulation Act 1967	Section 94(1).
1967 c. 80	Criminal Justice Act 1967	Section 39(3) to (6).
1967 c. 80	Criminal Justice Act 1967	In section 47(10) the words "and as being Exchequer moneys".
1967 c. 80	Criminal Justice Act 1967	In section 54(5) the words from "and the maximum fine" onwards.
1967 c. 80	Criminal Justice Act 1967	In section 60(2), the words "between conviction and sentence".
1967 c. 83	Sea Fisheries (Shellfish) Act 1967	Section 19(3).
1968 c. 27	Firearms Act 1968	In Schedule 6, in column 4 of Part I, in the entries relating to sections 16, 17(1) and (2) and 18(1), the words "in England or Wales".
1968 c. 60	Theft Act 1968	Section 26(4).
1969 c. 54	Children and Young Persons Act 1969	In Schedule 5, paragraph 1.
1970 c. 31	Administration of Justice Act 1970	Section 50(a).
1970 c. 31	Administration of Justice Act 1970	In Schedule 9, in paragraph 12, the word "damages".
1971 c. 10	Vehicles (Excise) Act 1971	Section 35(1).
1971 c. 23	Courts Act 1971	Section 53(2)(b).
1971 c. 23	Courts Act 1971	In Schedule 8 paragraph 43(2) and, in paragraph 48(a), the reference to section 73(5).
1971 c. 48	Criminal Damage Act 1971	Section 7(1).
1971 c. 48	Criminal Damage Act 1971	Section 8.
1971 c. 77	Immigration Act 1971	In Schedule 2, in paragraph 23(3) the words "and as being Exchequer moneys", and the same words in paragraph 31(4).
1972 c. 20	Road Traffic Act 1972	Section 185(1).

== Subsequent developments ==
The act has been amended and partially repealed by numerous subsequent enactments. Section 48, concerning proceedings under the Indecency with Children Act 1960, was repealed by schedule 7 to the Sexual Offences Act 2003. Section 49, on community service orders in lieu of a warrant of commitment for failure to pay a fine, was repealed by the Crime and Disorder Act 1998. Section 31 (punishment for certain offences of Sunday trading) and section 59 (abolition of duty to re-convey certain prisons to local authorities), together with the proviso to section 66(6) and words in section 66(7)(a), were repealed by the Statute Law (Repeals) Act 2008. Section 24(3) was repealed by the Road Safety Act 2006. Section 60, on powers of entry in connection with the acquisition of land for prisons, was omitted by the Housing and Planning Act 2016. Section 51(4), on the execution of process between England and Wales and Scotland, was omitted by the Courts and Tribunals (Judiciary and Functions of Staff) Act 2018.

Section 46, on the admissibility of written statements made outside England and Wales, was substantially repealed by the Criminal Justice and Public Order Act 1994 and the Criminal Procedure and Investigations Act 1996, with the provisions inserted by the latter subsequently repealed by the Criminal Justice Act 2003. Section 36, which provides for references by the Attorney General to the Court of Appeal of a point of law following an acquittal on indictment, remains in force and continues to be used as the "Attorney General's Reference" procedure; it has been amended by the Constitutional Reform Act 2005 and the Legal Aid, Sentencing and Punishment of Offenders Act 2012.
