= Criminal Justice Act =

Legislation in various countries

Criminal Justice Act (with its many variations) is a stock short title used for legislation in Canada, Malaysia, Ireland, and the United Kingdom relating to criminal law (including both substantive and procedural aspects of that law). It tends to be used for Acts that do not have a single cohesive subject matter.

The Bill for an Act with this short title will be known as the Criminal Justice Bill during its passage through Parliament.

Criminal Justice Act may be a generic name either for legislation bearing that short title or for all legislation relating to criminal law. It is not a term of art.

See also the Criminal Law Act and the Criminal Law Amendment Act.

== List ==
=== Canada ===
- The Youth Criminal Justice Act (2002, c.1)

=== Malaysia ===
- The Criminal Justice Act 1953

=== Ireland ===
- The Criminal Justice (Evidence) Act 1924 (No.37)
- The Criminal Justice (Administration) Act 1924 (No.44)
- The Criminal Justice Act 1951 (No.2)
- The Criminal Justice Act 1960 (No.27)
- The Criminal Justice (Legal Aid) Act 1962 (No.12)
- The Criminal Justice Act 1964 (No.5)
- The Criminal Justice (Verdicts) Act 1976 (No.34)
- The Criminal Justice (Community Service) Act 1983 (No.23)
- The Criminal Justice Act 1984 (No.22)
- The Criminal Justice Act 1990 (No.16)
- The Criminal Justice (Forensic Evidence) Act 1990 (No.34)
- The Criminal Justice Act 1993 (No.6)
- The Criminal Justice (Public Order) Act 1994 (No.2)
- The Criminal Justice Act 1994 (No.15)
- The Criminal Justice (Drug Trafficking) Act 1996 (No.29)
- The Criminal Justice (Miscellaneous Provisions) Act 1997 (No.4)
- The Criminal Justice (Release of Prisoners) Act 1998 (No.36)
- The Criminal Justice (Locations of Victims' Remains) Act 1999 (No.9)
- The Criminal Justice Act 1999 (No.10)
- The Criminal Justice (United Nations Convention Against Torture) Act 2000 (No.11)
- The Criminal Justice (Safety of United Nations Workers) Act 2000 (No.16)
- The Criminal Justice (Theft and Fraud Offences) Act 2001 (No.50)
- The Criminal Justice (Public Order) Act 2003 (No.16)
- The Criminal Justice (Illicit Traffic by Sea) Act 2003 (No.18)
- The Criminal Justice (Temporary Release of Prisoners) Act 2003 (No.34)
- The Criminal Justice (Joint Investigation Teams) Act 2004 (No.20)
- The Criminal Justice (Terrorist Offences) Act 2005 (No.2)
- The Criminal Justice Act 2006 (No.26)
- The Criminal Justice Act 2007 (No.29)
- The Criminal Justice (Mutual Assistance) Act 2008 (No.7)
- The Criminal Justice (Surveillance) Act 2009 (No 19)
- The Criminal Justice (Miscellaneous Provisions) Act 2009 (No 28)
- The Criminal Justice (Amendment) Act 2009 (No 32)
- The Criminal Justice (Money Laundering and Terrorist Financing) Act 2010 (No 6)
- The Criminal Justice (Psychoactive Substances) Act 2010 (No 22)
- The Criminal Justice (Public Order) Act 2011 (No 5)
- The Criminal Justice Act 2011 (No 22)
- The Criminal Justice (Community Service) (Amendment) Act 2011 (No 24)
- The Criminal Justice (Female Genital Mutilation) Act 2012 (No 11)

=== United Kingdom ===
- The Criminal Justice Administration Act 1851 (14 & 15 Vict. c. 55)
- The Criminal Justice Act 1855 (18 & 19 Vict. c. 126)
- The Criminal Justice Act 1856 (19 & 20 Vict. c. 118)
- The Criminal Justice Administration Act 1914 (4 & 5 Geo. 5. c. 58)
- The Criminal Justice Act 1925 (15 & 16 Geo. 5. c. 86)
- The Criminal Justice Act 1948 (11 & 12 Geo. 6. c. 58)
- The Criminal Justice Act 1961 (9 & 10 Eliz. 2. c. 39)
- The Criminal Justice Administration Act 1962 (10 & 11 Eliz. 2. c. 15)
- The Criminal Justice Act 1967 (c. 80)
- The Criminal Justice Act 1972 (c. 71)
- The Criminal Justice (Amendment) Act 1981 (c. 27)
- The Criminal Justice Act 1982 (c. 48)
- The Criminal Justice Act 1987 (c. 38)
- The Criminal Justice Act 1988 (c. 33)
- The Criminal Justice (International Co-operation) Act 1990 (c. 5)
- The Criminal Justice Act 1991 (c. 53)
- The Criminal Justice Act 1993 (c. 36)
- The Criminal Justice and Public Order Act 1994 (c. 33)
- The Criminal Justice (Terrorism and Conspiracy) Act 1998 (c. 40)
- The Criminal Justice (International Co-operation) (Amendment) Act 1998 (c. 27)
- The Criminal Justice and Court Services Act 2000 (c. 43)
- The Criminal Justice and Police Act 2001 (c. 16)
- The Criminal Justice Act 2003 (c. 44)
- The Criminal Justice and Immigration Act 2008 (c. 4)
- The Criminal Justice and Courts Act 2015 (c. 2)

==== Scotland ====
- The Criminal Justice (Scotland) Act 1949 (12, 13 & 14 Geo. 6. c. 94)
- The Criminal Justice (Scotland) Act 1963 (c. 39)
- The Criminal Justice (Scotland) Act 1980 (c. 62)
- The Criminal Justice (Scotland) Act 1987 (c. 41)
- The Criminal Justice (Scotland) Act 1995 (c. 20)
- The Criminal Justice (Scotland) Act 2003 (asp. 7)
- The Police, Public Order and Criminal Justice (Scotland) Act 2006 (asp. 10)
- The Criminal Justice and Licensing (Scotland) Act 2010 (asp. 13)
- The Criminal Justice (Scotland) Act 2016 (asp. 1)

==== Northern Ireland ====
- The Criminal Justice Act (Northern Ireland) 1933 (23 & 24 Geo. 5. c. 31 (N.I.))
- The Summary Jurisdiction and Criminal Justice Act (Northern Ireland) 1935 (25 & 26 Geo. 5. c. 13 (N.I.))
- The Criminal Justice Act (Northern Ireland) 1945 (c. 15) (N.I.)
- The Criminal Justice Act (Northern Ireland) 1953 (c. 14) (N.I.)
- The Summary Jurisdiction and Criminal Justice Act (Northern Ireland) 1958 (c. 9) (N.I.)
- The Criminal Justice Act (Northern Ireland) 1966 (c. 20) (N.I.)
- The Criminal Justice (Miscellaneous Provisions) Act (Northern Ireland) 1968 (c. 28) (N.I.)
- The Criminal Justice Act (Northern Ireland) 2013 (c. 7) (N.I.)
- The Criminal Justice (Committal Reform) Act (Northern Ireland) 2022 (c. 4) (N.I.)

Criminal Justice Order

Several Orders in Council with this title have been passed. The change in nomenclature is due to the demise of the Parliament of Northern Ireland and the imposition of direct rule. These orders are considered to be primary legislation.

- The Criminal Justice (Northern Ireland) Order 1980 (SI 1980/704 (N.I.6))
- The Criminal Justice (Northern Ireland) Order 1986 (SI 1986/1883 (N.I.15))
- The Criminal Justice (Serious Fraud) (Northern Ireland) Order 1988 (SI 1988/1846 (N.I.16))
- The Criminal Justice (Evidence, Etc.) (Northern Ireland) Order 1988 (SI 1988/1847 (N.I.17))
- The Criminal Justice (Confiscation) (Northern Ireland) Order 1990 (SI 1990/2588 (N.I.17))
- The Criminal Justice (Northern Ireland) Order 1991 (SI 1991/1711 (N.I.16))
- The Criminal Justice (Confiscation) (Northern Ireland) Order 1993 (SI 1993/3146 (N.I.13))
- The Criminal Justice (Northern Ireland) Order 1994 (SI 1994/2795 (N.I.15))
- The Criminal Justice (Northern Ireland) Order 1996 (SI 1996/3160 (N.I.24))
- The Criminal Justice (Northern Ireland) Order 1998 (SI 1998/2839 (N.I.20))
- The Criminal Justice (Children) (Northern Ireland) Order 1998 (SI 1998/1504 (N.I.9))
- The Criminal Justice (Northern Ireland) Order 2003 (SI 2003/1247 (N.I.13))
- The Criminal Justice (No.2) (Northern Ireland) Order 2003 (SI 2003/3194 (N.I.18))
- The Criminal Justice (Northern Ireland) Order 2004 (SI 2004/1500 (N.I.9))
- The Criminal Justice (Evidence) (Northern Ireland) Order 2004 (SI 2004/1501 (N.I.10))
- The Criminal Justice (No.2) (Northern Ireland) Order 2004 (SI 2004/1991 (N.I.15))
- The Criminal Justice (Northern Ireland) Order 2005 (SI 2005/1965 (N.I.15))
- The Criminal Justice (Northern Ireland) Order 2008 (SI 2008/1216 (N.I.1))

=== United States ===
- The "Criminal Justice Act" which was codified as 18 U.S.C. § 3006

== See also ==
- List of short titles
