= Criminal Procedure (Consequential Provisions) (Scotland) Act 1995 =

Act of the Parliament of the United Kingdom

Criminal Procedure (Consequential Provisions) (Scotland) Act 1995 (Note: Section 7(1).)
- Act of Parliament
- Parliament of the United Kingdom
- Long title: An Act to make provision for repeals, consequential amendments, transitional and transitory matters and savings in connection with the consolidation of enactments in the Criminal Procedure (Scotland) Act 1995, the Proceeds of Crime (Scotland) Act 1995 and the Criminal Law (Consolidation) (Scotland) Act 1995.
- Citation: 1995 c. 40
- Territorial extent: Scotland (Note: Paragraph 5 of schedule 3 and section 7 also extend to England and Wales and Northern Ireland, as does any amendment contained in schedule 4 which extends to those territories. Section 7(3)–(5).)

Dates
- Royal assent: 8 November 1995
- Commencement: 1 April 1996 (Note: Section 7(2).)
Other legislation
Amends	Protection of Animals Act 1934; Local Government (Scotland) Act 1973; Fatal Accidents and Sudden Deaths Inquiry (Scotland) Act 1976; Law Reform (Miscellaneous Provisions) (Scotland) Act 1980; Criminal Justice Act 1988; Social Security Administration Act 1992; See § Repealed enactments
Repeals/revokes	See § Repealed enactments
Amended by	Northern Ireland (Emergency Provisions) Act 1996; Housing Grants, Construction and Regeneration Act 1996; Crime and Punishment (Scotland) Act 1997; Petroleum Act 1998; Powers of Criminal Courts (Sentencing) Act 2000; Regulation of Care (Scotland) Act 2001; Proceeds of Crime Act 2002; Mental Health (Care and Treatment) (Scotland) Act 2003; Salmon and Freshwater Fisheries (Consolidation) (Scotland) Act 2003; Communications Act 2003; Antisocial Behaviour etc. (Scotland) Act 2004; Statute Law (Repeals) Act 2004; Pensions Act 2004; Fire (Scotland) Act 2005; Serious Organised Crime and Police Act 2005; Licensing (Scotland) Act 2005; Joint Inspection of Children's Services and Inspection of Social Work Services (Scotland) Act 2006; Police, Public Order and Criminal Justice (Scotland) Act 2006; Animal Health and Welfare (Scotland) Act 2006 (Consequential Provisions) Order 2006; Scotland Act 1998 (River Tweed) Order 2006; Wireless Telegraphy Act 2006; Violent Crime Reduction Act 2006; Companies Act 2006; Police and Justice Act 2006; Finance Act 2007; Public Health etc. (Scotland) Act 2008; Finance Act 2009; Public Services Reform (Scotland) Act 2010; Criminal Justice and Licensing (Scotland) Act 2010; Finance (No. 3) Act 2010; Treaty of Lisbon (Changes in Terminology) Order 2011; Police and Fire Reform (Scotland) Act 2012; Children's Hearings (Scotland) Act 2011 (Modification of Primary Legislation) Order 2013; Road Safety Act 2006 (Consequential Amendments) Order 2015; Inquiries into Fatal Accidents and Sudden Deaths etc. (Scotland) Act 2016; Bankruptcy (Scotland) Act 2016; Forestry and Land Management (Scotland) Act 2018 (Consequential Amendments) Regulations 2019; European Union Withdrawal (Consequential Modifications) (EU Exit) Regulations 2020
Relates to	Criminal Procedure (Scotland) Act 1995; Proceeds of Crime (Scotland) Act 1995; Criminal Law (Consolidation) (Scotland) Act 1995

Status: Partially repealed

Text of statute as originally enacted

Revised text of statute as amended

Text of the Criminal Procedure (Consequential Provisions) (Scotland) Act 1995 as in force today (including any amendments) within the United Kingdom, from legislation.gov.uk.

The Criminal Procedure (Consequential Provisions) (Scotland) Act 1995 (c. 40) is an act of the Parliament of the United Kingdom that made provision for repeals, consequential amendments, transitional and transitory matters and savings in connection with the consolidation of enactments relating to criminal procedure, proceeds of crime, and criminal law in Scotland.

== Provisions ==
=== Repealed enactments ===
Section 6(1) of the act repealed 35 enactments, listed in schedule 5 to the act.

Citation	Short title	Extent of repeal
11 Geo. 4 & 1 Will. 4. c. 69	Court of Session Act 1830	Section 18
50 & 51 Vict. c. 35	Criminal Procedure (Scotland) Act 1887	The whole act.
4 & 5 Geo. 5. c. 58	Criminal Justice Administration Act 1914	Section 28(3)
12, 13 & 14 Geo. 6. c. 94	Criminal Justice (Scotland) Act 1949	The whole act.
1 & 2 Eliz. 2. c. 14	Prevention of Crime Act 1953	Section 1
2 & 3 Eliz. 2. c. 48	Summary Jurisdiction (Scotland) Act 1954	The whole act.
1968 c. 49	Social Work (Scotland) Act 1968	Section 31(1)
1975 c. 20	District Courts (Scotland) Act 1975	Sections 2 to 4
1975 c. 20	District Courts (Scotland) Act 1975	Section 6
1975 c. 20	District Courts (Scotland) Act 1975	In Schedule 1, paragraph 27
1975 c. 21	Criminal Procedure (Scotland) Act 1975	The whole act.
1977 c. 45	Criminal Law Act 1977	In Schedule 6, the entries relating to the Criminal Procedure (Scotland) Act 1975
1977 c. 45	Criminal Law Act 1977	In Schedule 7, paragraph 2
1977 c. 45	Criminal Law Act 1977	Schedule 11
1978 c. 29	National Health Service (Scotland) Act 1978	In Schedule 16, paragraph 41
1978 c. 49	Community Service by Offenders (Scotland) Act 1978	Sections 1 to 8
1978 c. 49	Community Service by Offenders (Scotland) Act 1978	Sections 10 to 13
1978 c. 49	Community Service by Offenders (Scotland) Act 1978	Section 15
1978 c. 49	Community Service by Offenders (Scotland) Act 1978	In Schedule 2, paragraphs 2 and 3
1979 c. 16	Criminal Evidence Act 1979	In section 1(1) the words "sections 141 and 346 of the Criminal Procedure (Scotland) Act 1975"
1980 c. 4	Bail (Scotland) Act 1980	The whole act.
1980 c. 62	Criminal Justice (Scotland) Act 1980	Sections 1 to 3
1980 c. 62	Criminal Justice (Scotland) Act 1980	Sections 4 to 7
1980 c. 62	Criminal Justice (Scotland) Act 1980	Sections 9 to 43
1980 c. 62	Criminal Justice (Scotland) Act 1980	Section 45(1)
1980 c. 62	Criminal Justice (Scotland) Act 1980	Sections 46 to 50
1980 c. 62	Criminal Justice (Scotland) Act 1980	Sections 52 to 54
1980 c. 62	Criminal Justice (Scotland) Act 1980	Sections 58 to 67
1980 c. 62	Criminal Justice (Scotland) Act 1980	Part V
1980 c. 62	Criminal Justice (Scotland) Act 1980	Sections 78 and 80
1980 c. 62	Criminal Justice (Scotland) Act 1980	Schedules 1 to 4
1980 c. 62	Criminal Justice (Scotland) Act 1980	In Schedule 7, paragraphs 25 to 78
1981 c. 45	Forgery and Counterfeiting Act 1981	Section 26
1982 c. 48	Criminal Justice Act 1982	Part IV
1982 c. 48	Criminal Justice Act 1982	Schedules 6 and 7
1982 c. 49	Transport Act 1982	In section 40, paragraph (c) of subsection (5)
1984 c. 39	Video Recordings Act 1984	Section 20
1985 c. 66	Bankruptcy (Scotland) Act 1985	In section 5(4) the words "by section 1(1) of the Criminal Justice (Scotland) Act 1987"
1985 c. 66	Bankruptcy (Scotland) Act 1985	In section 7(1) the words "by section 1(1) of the Criminal Justice (Scotland) Act 1987"
1985 c. 73	Law Reform (Miscellaneous Provisions) (Scotland) Act 1985	Section 21
1985 c. 73	Law Reform (Miscellaneous Provisions) (Scotland) Act 1985	Sections 36 and 37
1985 c. 73	Law Reform (Miscellaneous Provisions) (Scotland) Act 1985	Section 40
1985 c. 73	Law Reform (Miscellaneous Provisions) (Scotland) Act 1985	Section 43
1985 c. 73	Law Reform (Miscellaneous Provisions) (Scotland) Act 1985	Section 45
1985 c. 73	Law Reform (Miscellaneous Provisions) (Scotland) Act 1985	In Schedule 2, paragraphs 16 to 20 and paragraph 23
1985 c. 73	Law Reform (Miscellaneous Provisions) (Scotland) Act 1985	In Schedule 3, paragraphs 1, 3 and 4
1987 c. 41	Criminal Justice (Scotland) Act 1987	Part I
1987 c. 41	Criminal Justice (Scotland) Act 1987	Sections 56 to 68
1987 c. 41	Criminal Justice (Scotland) Act 1987	In Schedule 1, paragraphs 4 to 18
1988 c. 53	Road Traffic Offenders Act 1988	In section 60, paragraph (c) of subsection (6)
1988 c. 54	Road Traffic (Consequential Provisions) Act 1988	In Schedule 3, paragraph 34
1990 c. 5	Criminal Justice (International Co-operation) Act 1990	Section 15
1990 c. 5	Criminal Justice (International Co-operation) Act 1990	In Schedule 4, paragraph 5
1990 c. 40	Law Reform (Miscellaneous Provisions) (Scotland) Act 1990	Sections 56 and 57
1990 c. 40	Law Reform (Miscellaneous Provisions) (Scotland) Act 1990	Section 62
1990 c. 40	Law Reform (Miscellaneous Provisions) (Scotland) Act 1990	Schedule 6
1991 c. 53	Criminal Justice Act 1991	In Schedule 3, paragraph 8
1991 c. 62	Armed Forces Act 1991	In Schedule 2, paragraph 9(2)
1993 c. 9	Prisoners and Criminal Proceedings (Scotland) Act 1993	Section 8
1993 c. 9	Prisoners and Criminal Proceedings (Scotland) Act 1993	Section 14(1)
1993 c. 9	Prisoners and Criminal Proceedings (Scotland) Act 1993	Sections 28 to 35
1993 c. 9	Prisoners and Criminal Proceedings (Scotland) Act 1993	Sections 37 to 43
1993 c. 9	Prisoners and Criminal Proceedings (Scotland) Act 1993	In section 46, the definition of "the 1975 Act"
1993 c. 9	Prisoners and Criminal Proceedings (Scotland) Act 1993	Schedules 3 and 4
1993 c. 9	Prisoners and Criminal Proceedings (Scotland) Act 1993	In Schedule 5, paragraph 1
1993 c. 13	Carrying of Knives Etc. (Scotland) Act 1993	The whole act.
1993 c. 36	Criminal Justice Act 1993	Sections 68 and 69
1993 c. 36	Criminal Justice Act 1993	In Schedule 5, paragraph 2
1994 c. 33	Criminal Justice and Public Order Act 1994	Section 47(4)
1994 c. 33	Criminal Justice and Public Order Act 1994	In section 129, subsections (1) to (3)
1994 c. 33	Criminal Justice and Public Order Act 1994	Section 132
1994 c. 33	Criminal Justice and Public Order Act 1994	In section 157, subsection (7)
1994 c. 37	Drug Trafficking Act 1994	In section 37, the words "that Part of" where they occur and in paragraph (a)(ii) of subsection (2) the words "Part I of"
1995 c. 20	Criminal Justice (Scotland) Act 1995	The whole act.
1995 c. 36	Children (Scotland) Act 1995	Section 49
1995 c. 36	Children (Scotland) Act 1995	In Schedule 4, paragraphs 24, 27 and 29
