= Drug Trafficking Act 1994 =

Act of the Parliament of the United Kingdom

Drug Trafficking Act 1994 (Note: Section 69(1).)
- Act of Parliament
- Parliament of the United Kingdom
- Long title: An Act to consolidate the Drug Trafficking Offences Act 1986 and certain provisions of the Criminal Justice (International Co-operation) Act 1990 relating to drug trafficking.
- Citation: 1994 c. 37
- Territorial extent: England and Wales; Scotland (in part); Northern Ireland (in part); (Note: Section 68.)

Dates
- Royal assent: 3 November 1994
- Commencement: 3 February 1995 (Note: Section 69(2).)

Other legislation
- Amends: Bankruptcy Act 1914; Land Registration Act 1925; Criminal Appeal Act 1968; Misuse of Drugs Act 1971Rehabilitation of Offenders Act 1974; Civil Jurisdiction and Judgments Act 1982; Criminal Justice Act 1982; Police and Criminal Evidence Act 1984; Bankruptcy (Scotland) Act 1985; Drug Trafficking Offences Act 1986Insolvency Act 1986; Criminal Justice (Scotland) Act 1987; Criminal Justice Act 1988; Housing Act 1988; Extradition Act 1989; Criminal Justice (International Co-operation) Act 1990; Criminal Justice (Confiscation) (Northern Ireland) Order 1990; Criminal Justice Act 1993; See § Repealed enactments
- Amended by: Criminal Procedure (Consequential Provisions) (Scotland) Act 1995; Private International Law (Miscellaneous Provisions) Act 1995; Proceeds of Crime (Scotland) Act 1995; Proceeds of Crime (Northern Ireland) Order 1996; Justices of the Peace Act 1997; Crime and Disorder Act 1998; Criminal Justice (Terrorism and Conspiracy) Act 1998; Proceeds of Crime Act 2002; Land Registration Act 2002; Courts Act 2003; Commissioners for Revenue and Customs Act 2005; Serious Organised Crime and Police Act 2005; Public Bodies (Merger of the Director of Public Prosecutions and the Director of Revenue and Customs Prosecutions) Order 2014; Criminal Justice and Courts Act 2015; Bankruptcy (Scotland) Act 2016 (Consequential Provisions and Modifications) Order 2016
- Relates to: Criminal Courts Act 1973

Status: Partially repealed

Text of statute as originally enacted

Revised text of statute as amended

Text of the Drug Trafficking Act 1994 as in force today (including any amendments) within the United Kingdom, from legislation.gov.uk.

The Drug Trafficking Act 1994 (c. 37) is an act of the Parliament of the United Kingdom. It largely replaced the Drug Trafficking Offences Act 1986.

Where the defendant is convicted of a drug trafficking offence and the prosecutor applies to the Crown Court for a confiscation order the court must determine whether the defendant has benefited from drug trafficking.

If at any time the defendant has received any payment or other reward in connection with drug trafficking carried out by him or another he will be deemed to have benefited from drug trafficking and the court must make a confiscation order. The Drug Trafficking Act 1994 came into force on 3 February 1995 and any benefit received by the defendant in connection with drug trafficking prior to that date must be included when calculating the defendant's benefit.

== Provisions ==
The act embraces 69 sections and is divided into 4 parts with 3 schedules.

=== Repealed enactments ===
Section 67(1) of the act repealed 10 enactments, listed in schedule 3 to the act.

Enactments repealed by section 67(1)
Citation	Short title	Extent of repeal
15 & 16 Geo. 5. c. 21	Land Registration Act 1925	In section 49(1)(g), the words "the Drug Trafficking Offences Act 1986 or".
1984 c. 60	Police and Criminal Evidence Act 1984	Section 116(2)(aa).
1985 c. 66	Bankruptcy (Scotland) Act 1985	In section 7(1), in the definition of "charging order", the words "by section 9(2) of the Drug Trafficking Offences Act 1986 or".
1986 c. 32	Drug Trafficking Offences Act 1986	The whole act, except sections 24(6), 32, 34, and 40(1) and (3) to (5).
1987 c. 41	Criminal Justice (Scotland) Act 1987	Section 31.
1987 c. 41	Criminal Justice (Scotland) Act 1987	Section 45(3) and (7).
1988 c. 33	Criminal Justice Act 1988	Section 103(1).
1988 c. 33	Criminal Justice Act 1988	In Schedule 5, Part I.
1988 c. 50	Housing Act 1988	In Schedule 17, paragraphs 71 and 72.
1990 c. 5	Criminal Justice (International Co-operation) Act 1990	Section 14.
1990 c. 5	Criminal Justice (International Co-operation) Act 1990	In section 15, in subsection (1), the words "under section 31(1) of the Powers of Criminal Courts Act 1973 or", and in subsection (3) the words from "shall be that" to "Scotland".
1990 c. 5	Criminal Justice (International Co-operation) Act 1990	Section 16.
1990 c. 5	Criminal Justice (International Co-operation) Act 1990	Section 23A.
1990 c. 5	Criminal Justice (International Co-operation) Act 1990	Sections 25 to 29.
1990 c. 5	Criminal Justice (International Co-operation) Act 1990	Section 30(2) and (3).
1990 c. 5	Criminal Justice (International Co-operation) Act 1990	Section 31(2).
1990 c. 5	Criminal Justice (International Co-operation) Act 1990	In Schedule 4, paragraph 4.
1993 c. 36	Criminal Justice Act 1993	Sections 7 to 16.
1993 c. 36	Criminal Justice Act 1993	Section 18.
1993 c. 36	Criminal Justice Act 1993	Section 20(1).
1993 c. 36	Criminal Justice Act 1993	Section 21(2) and (3)(a) and (b).
1993 c. 36	Criminal Justice Act 1993	Section 22(1).
1993 c. 36	Criminal Justice Act 1993	Section 24(1) to (11).
1993 c. 36	Criminal Justice Act 1993	Section 25.
1993 c. 36	Criminal Justice Act 1993	Section 26(1).
1993 c. 36	Criminal Justice Act 1993	Section 78(7).
1993 c. 36	Criminal Justice Act 1993	In section 79, in subsection (2), the references to section 25 and to paragraph 5 of Schedule 4; and in subsection (3), the words "13(9) to (11)," and "24(2), (3) and (7) to (10),".
1993 c. 36	Criminal Justice Act 1993	In Schedule 4, paragraphs 1 and 5.
1993 c. 36	Criminal Justice Act 1993	In Schedule 5, paragraphs 5 and 6.
1994 c. 33	Criminal Justice and Public Order Act 1994	In Schedule 9, paragraph 28.
