= Proceeds of Crime (Scotland) Act 1995 =

Act of the Parliament of the United Kingdom

Proceeds of Crime (Scotland) Act 1995 (Note: Section 50(1).)
- Act of Parliament
- Parliament of the United Kingdom
- Long title: An Act to consolidate as regards Scotland certain enactments relating to the confiscation of the proceeds of, and forfeiture of property used in, crime.
- Citation: 1995 c. 43
- Territorial extent: Scotland (Note: Section 50(3). Section 44, Schedule 2 and section 50 of the act also extend to England and Wales by virtue of section 50(4). Section 42 extends only to England and Wales by virtue of section 50(5).)

Dates
- Royal assent: 8 November 1995
- Commencement: 1 April 1996 (Note: Section 50(2).)

Other legislation
- Amends: See § Provisions
- Repeals/revokes: See § Provisions
- Amended by: Criminal Procedure (Consequential Provisions) (Scotland) Act 1995; Crime and Punishment (Scotland) Act 1997; Crime and Disorder Act 1998; Criminal Justice (Terrorism and Conspiracy) Act 1998; Proceeds of Crime Act 2002; Debt Arrangement and Attachment (Scotland) Act 2002; Bankruptcy and Diligence etc. (Scotland) Act 2007; Criminal Justice and Licensing (Scotland) Act 2010; Courts Reform (Scotland) Act 2014 (Consequential Provisions No. 2) Order 2015; Bankruptcy (Scotland) Act 2016; Courts Reform (Scotland) Act 2014 (Relevant Officer and Consequential Provisions) Order 2016; Bankruptcy (Scotland) Act 2016 (Consequential Provisions and Modifications) Order 2016
- Relates to: Proceeds of Crime Act 1995; Criminal Procedure (Scotland) Act 1995; Criminal Law (Consolidation) (Scotland) Act 1995; Criminal Procedure (Consequential Provisions) (Scotland) Act 1995

Status: Amended

Text of statute as originally enacted

Revised text of statute as amended

Text of the Proceeds of Crime (Scotland) Act 1995 as in force today (including any amendments) within the United Kingdom, from legislation.gov.uk.

The Proceeds of Crime (Scotland) Act 1995 (c. 43) is an act of the Parliament of the United Kingdom that consolidated enactments relating to the confiscation of the proceeds of, and forfeiture of property used in, crime in Scotland.

The enactments consolidated by the act were repealed by section 6(1) of, and schedule 5 to, the Criminal Procedure (Consequential Provisions) (Scotland) Act 1995.

== Provisions ==
The act contains five parts. Part I (sections 1–20) dealt with the confiscation of the proceeds of crime, consolidating provisions primarily from the Criminal Justice (Scotland) Act 1987 and the Criminal Justice (Scotland) Act 1995 (c. 20). Part II (sections 21–27) provides for the forfeiture of property used in crime. Part III (sections 28–34) provides for restraint orders in relation to realisable or forfeitable property. Part IV (sections 35–43) makes provision for reciprocal arrangements for the enforcement of orders, including orders made in England and Wales and outside the United Kingdom. Part V (sections 44–50) contains miscellaneous and general provisions.

The act also contains two schedules: Schedule 1 deals with the appointment, functions and supervision of administrators, and Schedule 2 deals with the sequestration of persons holding realisable or forfeitable property. A table of derivations, setting out the derivation of each provision of the act from its predecessor legislation, is appended to Schedule 2.

The repeals of the enactments consolidated by the act were effected by the Criminal Procedure (Consequential Provisions) (Scotland) Act 1995 (c. 40), which accompanied the act and also made provision for the consolidations in the Criminal Procedure (Scotland) Act 1995 (c. 46) and the Criminal Law (Consolidation) (Scotland) Act 1995 (c. 39).

== Subsequent developments ==
Part I (sections 1–20, except section 2(7)) of the act was repealed by the Proceeds of Crime Act 2002 (c. 29), with effect from 24 February 2003 in so far as the repeal related to sections 18 to 20, and otherwise from 24 March 2003. The Proceeds of Crime Act 2002 introduced a new unified regime for confiscation of the proceeds of crime across the United Kingdom, replacing the Scottish confiscation provisions of this act.

The remaining parts of the act have been amended on several occasions. Section 32 was substantially amended by the Bankruptcy and Diligence etc. (Scotland) Act 2007 (asp 3). Section 27, relating to appeals, was amended by the Courts Reform (Scotland) Act 2014 (Consequential Provisions No. 2) Order 2015 (SSI 2015/338) to substitute references to the appropriate appeal court. Schedule 2 was amended by the Bankruptcy (Scotland) Act 2016 (Consequential Provisions and Modifications) Order 2016 (SI 2016/1034) to update references to the bankruptcy legislation.
