= Drug Trafficking Offences Act 1986 =

Act of the Parliament of the United Kingdom

Drug Trafficking Offences Act 1986 (Note: Section 40(1).)
- Act of Parliament
- Parliament of the United Kingdom
- Long title: An Act to make provision for the recovery of the proceeds of drug trafficking and other provision in connection with drug trafficking, to make provision about the supply of articles which may be used or adapted for use in the administration of controlled drugs or used to prepare a controlled drug for administration and to increase the number of assistant commissioners of police for the metropolis.
- Citation: 1986 c. 32
- Territorial extent: England and Wales; Scotland (in part); Northern Ireland (in part); (Note: Section 40(3)–(5).)

Dates
- Royal assent: 8 July 1986
- Commencement: various (Note: Section 40(2).)

Other legislation
- Amends: Metropolitan Police Act 1856; Bankruptcy Act 1914; Land Registration Act 1925; Misuse of Drugs Act 1971; Rehabilitation of Offenders Act 1974; Civil Jurisdiction and Judgments Act 1982; Criminal Justice Act 1982; Police and Criminal Evidence Act 1984; Bankruptcy (Scotland) Act 1985
- Repeals/revokes: Metropolitan Police Act 1933; Insolvency Act 1986
- Amended by: Criminal Justice (Scotland) Act 1987; Land Registration Act 1988; Prevention of Terrorism (Temporary Provisions) Act 1989; Criminal Justice Act 1993; Police and Magistrates' Courts Act 1994; Drug Trafficking Act 1994

Status: Partially repealed

Text of statute as originally enacted

Revised text of statute as amended

Text of the Drug Trafficking Offences Act 1986 as in force today (including any amendments) within the United Kingdom, from legislation.gov.uk.

The Drug Trafficking Offences Act 1986 (c. 32) is an act of the Parliament of the United Kingdom.

== Provisions ==
The act was the first act specifically dealing with laundering the proceeds of drug trafficking. The legislation was enacted as a direct response to the failure of the courts' power making it impossible under the law, as it stood, to confiscate some £750,000 of drug trafficking proceeds which were traced directly to the offenders convicted in consequence of Operation Julie.

The act enables the forfeiture of unlawful proceeds.

== Further developments ==
The act was replaced the Drug Trafficking Act 1995.
