= Bankruptcy (Scotland) Act 2016 =

Act of the Scottish Parliament

Bankruptcy (Scotland) Act 2016 (Note: Section 238.)
- Act of the Scottish Parliament
- Scottish Parliament
- Long title: An Act of the Scottish Parliament to consolidate the Bankruptcy (Scotland) Act 1985, the Bankruptcy (Scotland) Act 1993, Part 1 of the Bankruptcy and Diligence etc. (Scotland) Act 2007, Part 2 of the Home Owner and Debtor Protection (Scotland) Act 2010, the Bankruptcy and Debt Advice (Scotland) Act 2014, the Protected Trust Deeds (Scotland) Regulations 2013 and related enactments.
- Citation: 2016 asp 21
- Territorial extent: Scotland

Dates
- Royal assent: 28 April 2016
- Commencement: various (Note: Section 237.)
Other legislation
Amends	Administration of Justice Act 1956; Local Government (Scotland) Act 1973; Legal Aid (Scotland) Act 1986; Debtors (Scotland) Act 1987; Crofters (Scotland) Act 1993; Proceeds of Crime (Scotland) Act 1995; Criminal Procedure (Consequential Provisions) (Scotland) Act 1995
Repeals/revokes	Bankruptcy (Scotland) Act 1985; Bankruptcy (Scotland) Act 1993; Bankruptcy and Debt Advice (Scotland) Act 2014
Amended by	Bankruptcy and Diligence etc. (Scotland) Act 2007; Protected Trust Deeds (Forms) (Scotland) Regulations 2016; Public Services Reform (Corporate Insolvency and Bankruptcy) (Scotland) Order 2017; Insolvency (Regulation (EU) 2015/848) (Miscellaneous Amendments) (Scotland) Regulations 2017; Private Housing (Tenancies) (Scotland) Act 2016 (Consequential Provisions) Regulations 2017; Banks and Building Societies (Priorities on Insolvency) Order 2018; Damages (Investment Returns and Periodical Payments) (Scotland) Act 2019; Insolvency (EU Exit) (Scotland) (Amendment) Regulations 2019; Insolvency (Scotland) Rules 2018 (Miscellaneous Amendments) Rules 2019; Coronavirus (Scotland) Act 2020; Coronavirus (Scotland) (No.2) Act 2020; Finance Act 2020; Bankruptcy (Miscellaneous Amendments) (Scotland) Regulations 2021; Financial Services Act 2021 (Prudential Regulation of Credit Institutions and Investment Firms) (Consequential Amendments and Miscellaneous Provisions) Regulations 2021; Coronavirus (Recovery and Reform) (Scotland) Act 2022; Financial Services Act 2021 (Prudential Regulation of Credit Institutions and Investment Firms) (Consequential Amendments and Miscellaneous Provisions) Regulations 2022; Bankruptcy and Debt Arrangement Scheme (Miscellaneous Amendment) (Scotland) Regulations 2023; Economic Crime and Corporate Transparency Act 2023; Bankruptcy and Diligence (Scotland) Act 2024; Protected Trust Deeds (Miscellaneous Amendment) (Scotland) Regulations 2024; Judicial Factors (Scotland) Act 2025; Employment Rights Act 2025

Status: Amended

Text of statute as originally enacted

Revised text of statute as amended

Text of the Bankruptcy (Scotland) Act 2016 as in force today (including any amendments) within the United Kingdom, from legislation.gov.uk.

The Bankruptcy (Scotland) Act 2016 (asp 21) is an act of the Scottish Parliament. It forms the key legislative provisions behind the law of bankruptcy in Scotland, with the different parts of the act generally following the steps one would take to sequestrate oneself in Scotland.

The act consolidated and codified the provisions of a number of acts relating to bankruptcy, including the Bankruptcy (Scotland) Act 1985 and Bankruptcy (Scotland) Act 1993, as well as the Bankruptcy and Debt Advice (Scotland) Act 2014.

The act commenced on 30 November 2016.
