= Criminal Procedure (Scotland) Act 1995 =

Act of the Parliament of the United Kingdom

Criminal Procedure (Scotland) Act 1995 (Note: Section 309(1).)
- Act of Parliament
- Parliament of the United Kingdom
- Long title: An Act to consolidate certain enactments relating to criminal procedure in Scotland.
- Citation: 1995 c. 46
- Territorial extent: Scotland (Note: Section 309(3). Certain provisions also extend to England and Wales (section 309(4)), Northern Ireland (section 309(5)), and the Isle of Man (section 309(6)).)

Dates
- Royal assent: 8 November 1995
- Commencement: 1 April 1996 (Note: Section 309(2).)

Other legislation
- Amended by: List: Criminal Procedure (Consequential Provisions) (Scotland) Act 1995; Proceeds of Crime (Scotland) Act 1995; Criminal Procedure and Investigations Act 1996; Community Service by Offenders (Hours of Work) (Scotland) Order 1996; Driving Licences (Community Driving Licence) Regulations 1996; Protection from Harassment Act 1997; Crime and Punishment (Scotland) Act 1997; Criminal Procedure (Intermediate Diets) (Scotland) Act 1998; Crime and Disorder Act 1998; Scotland Act 1998; Act of Adjournal (Extension of Time Limit for Service of Transcript of Examination) 1998; Mental Health (Public Safety and Appeals) (Scotland) Act 1999; Access to Justice Act 1999; Scotland Act 1998 (Consequential Modifications) (No.1) Order 1999; Scottish Criminal Cases Review Commission (Application to Summary Proceedings) Order 1999; Scotland Act 1998 (Consequential Modifications) (No.2) Order 1999; Adults with Incapacity (Scotland) Act 2000; Sexual Offences (Amendment) Act 2000; Debt Arrangement and Attachment (Scotland) Act 2002; Justice (Northern Ireland) Act 2002; Proceeds of Crime Act 2002; Act of Adjournal (Criminal Appeals) 2002; Protection of Children (Scotland) Act 2003; Criminal Justice (Scotland) Act 2003; Building (Scotland) Act 2003; Mental Health (Care and Treatment) (Scotland) Act 2003; Communications Act 2003; Crime (International Co-operation) Act 2003; Extradition Act 2003; Criminal Justice Act 2003; Extended Sentences for Violent Offenders (Scotland) Order 2003; Act of Adjournal (Criminal Appeals) 2003; Vulnerable Witnesses (Scotland) Act 2004; Criminal Procedure (Amendment) (Scotland) Act 2004; Antisocial Behaviour etc. (Scotland) Act 2004; Constitutional Reform Act 2005; Prohibition of Female Genital Mutilation (Scotland) Act 2005; Protection of Children and Prevention of Sexual Offences (Scotland) Act 2005; Management of Offenders etc. (Scotland) Act 2005; Criminal Procedure (Amendment) (Scotland) Act 2004 (Incidental, Supplemental and Consequential Provisions) Order 2005; Mental Health (Care and Treatment) (Scotland) Act 2003 (Modification of Enactments) Order 2005; Courts Act 2003 (Consequential Provisions) Order 2005; Manufacture and Storage of Explosives Regulations 2005; Police, Public Order and Criminal Justice (Scotland) Act 2006; Wireless Telegraphy Act 2006; Violent Crime Reduction Act 2006; Armed Forces Act 2006; Water Environment (Consequential and Savings Provisions) (Scotland) Order 2006; Animal Health and Welfare (Scotland) Act 2006 (Consequential Provisions) Order 2006; Bankruptcy and Diligence etc. (Scotland) Act 2007; Criminal Proceedings etc. (Reform) (Scotland) Act 2007; Adult Support and Protection (Scotland) Act 2007; Finance Act 2007; Protection of Vulnerable Groups (Scotland) Act 2007; Custodial Sentences and Weapons (Scotland) Act 2007; Criminal Justice and Immigration Act 2008; Judiciary and Courts (Scotland) Act 2008; Criminal Proceedings etc. (Reform) (Scotland) Act 2007 (Supplemental Provisions) Order 2008; Offender Management Act 2007 (Consequential Amendments) Order 2008; Sexual Offences (Scotland) Act 2009; Coroners and Justice Act 2009; Act of Adjournal (Amendment of the Criminal Procedure (Scotland) Act 1995) (Appeals by Stated Case) 2009; Licensing (Scotland) Act 2005 (Consequential Provisions) Order 2009; Mutual Recognition of Criminal Financial Penalties in the European Union (Scotland) Order 2009; Health Care and Associated Professions (Miscellaneous Amendments and Practitioner Psychologists) Order 2009; Criminal Justice and Licensing (Scotland) Act 2010; Criminal Procedure (Legal Assistance, Detention and Appeals) (Scotland) Act 2010; Sexual Offences (Scotland) Act 2009 (Supplemental and Consequential Provisions) Order 2010; Northern Ireland Act 1998 (Devolution of Policing and Justice Functions) Order 2010; Postal Services Act 2011; Wildlife and Natural Environment (Scotland) Act 2011; Double Jeopardy (Scotland) Act 2011; Criminal Justice and Licensing (Scotland) Act 2010 (Consequential and Supplementary Provisions) Order 2011; Public Services Reform (Scotland) Act 2010 (Consequential Modifications) Order 2011; Act of Adjournal (Amendment of the Criminal Procedure (Scotland) Act 1995) (Refixing diets) 2011; Libya (Asset-Freezing) Regulations 2011; Treaty of Lisbon (Changes in Terminology) Order 2011; Criminal Justice and Licensing (Scotland) Act 2010 (Consequential Provisions and Modifications) Order 2011; Health and Social Care Act 2012; Criminal Cases (Punishment and Review) (Scotland) Act 2012; Police and Fire Reform (Scotland) Act 2012; Protection of Freedoms Act 2012; Scotland Act 2012; Wildlife and Natural Environment (Scotland) Act 2011 (Consequential Modifications) Order 2012; Act of Adjournal (Amendment of the Criminal Procedure (Scotland) Act 1995) (Transcripts) 2012; Treaty of Lisbon (Changes in Terminology or Numbering) Order 2012; Partnerships (Prosecution) (Scotland) Act 2013; Crime and Courts Act 2013; Police and Fire Reform (Scotland) Act 2012 (Consequential Modifications and Savings) Order 2013; Children's Hearings (Scotland) Act 2011 (Modification of Primary Legislation) Order 2013; Children's Hearings (Scotland) Act 2011 (Consequential and Transitional Provisions and Savings) Order 2013; Victims and Witnesses (Scotland) Act 2014; Regulatory Reform (Scotland) Act 2014; Children and Young People (Scotland) Act 2014; Anti-social Behaviour, Crime and Policing Act 2014; Courts Reform (Scotland) Act 2014; Act of Adjournal (Amendment of the Criminal Procedure (Scotland) Act 1995 and Criminal Procedure Rules 1996) (Miscellaneous) 2014; Mutual Recognition of Criminal Financial Penalties in the European Union (Scotland) (No. 1) Order 2014; Mutual Recognition of Criminal Financial Penalties in the European Union (Scotland) (No. 2) Order 2014; Serious Crime Act 2015; Mental Health (Scotland) Act 2015; Air Weapons and Licensing (Scotland) Act 2015; Human Trafficking and Exploitation (Scotland) Act 2015; European Protection Order (Scotland) Regulations 2015; Courts Reform (Scotland) Act 2014 (Consequential Provisions) Order 2015; Public Bodies (Joint Working) (Scotland) Act 2014 (Consequential Modifications and Saving) Order 2015; Courts Reform (Scotland) Act 2014 (Consequential Provisions No. 2) Order 2015; Courts Reform (Scotland) Act 2014 (Consequential and Supplemental Provisions) Order 2015; Children and Young People (Scotland) Act 2014 (Consequential and Saving Provisions) Order 2015; Criminal Justice (Scotland) Act 2016; Community Justice (Scotland) Act 2016; Health (Tobacco, Nicotine etc. and Care) (Scotland) Act 2016; Abusive Behaviour and Sexual Harm (Scotland) Act 2016; Children and Social Work Act 2017; Criminal Finances Act 2017; Criminal Justice (Scotland) Act 2016 (Consequential and Transitional Provisions) Regulations 2017; Criminal Justice (Scotland) Act 2016 (Consequential and Supplementary Modifications) Regulations 2017; Criminal Justice (European Investigation Order) Regulations 2017; Domestic Abuse (Scotland) Act 2018; European Union (Withdrawal) Act 2018; Courts and Tribunals (Judiciary and Functions of Staff) Act 2018; Criminal Justice (Scotland) Act 2016 (Consequential Provisions) Order 2018; Counter-Terrorism and Border Security Act 2019; Age of Criminal Responsibility (Scotland) Act 2019; Vulnerable Witnesses (Criminal Evidence) (Scotland) Act 2019; Management of Offenders (Scotland) Act 2019; Offensive Weapons Act 2019; Presumption Against Short Periods of Imprisonment (Scotland) Order 2019; Victims and Witnesses (Scotland) Act 2014 (Supplementary Provision) Order 2019; Law Enforcement and Security (Amendment) (EU Exit) Regulations 2019; Coronavirus Act 2020; Coronavirus (Scotland) Act 2020; Coronavirus (Scotland) (No.2) Act 2020; Sentencing Act 2020; Act of Adjournal (Criminal Procedure (Scotland) Act 1995 Amendment) (Miscellaneous) 2020; Criminal Justice (EU Exit) (Scotland) (Amendment etc.) Regulations 2020; Counter-Terrorism and Sentencing Act 2021; Domestic Abuse Act 2021; Victims and Witnesses (Scotland) Act 2014 (Supplementary Provisions) Order 2021; Coronavirus (Recovery and Reform) (Scotland) Act 2022; Fireworks and Pyrotechnic Articles (Scotland) Act 2022; Health and Care Act 2022; Police, Crime, Sentencing and Courts Act 2022; Civil Protection Measures, European Protection Order and Victims' Rights (EU Exit) (Scotland) (Amendment Etc.) Regulations 2022; European Union (Withdrawal) Act 2018 (Repeal of EU Restrictions in Devolution Legislation, etc.) Regulations 2022; Bail and Release from Custody (Scotland) Act 2023; National Security Act 2023; National Security Act 2023 (Consequential Amendments of Primary Legislation) Regulations 2023; United Nations Convention on the Rights of the Child (Incorporation) (Scotland) Act 2024; Children (Care and Justice) (Scotland) Act 2024; Bail and Release from Custody (Scotland) Act 2023 (Consequential Modifications) Order 2024; Prisoners (Early Release) (Scotland) Act 2025; Victims, Witnesses, and Justice Reform (Scotland) Act 2025; Criminal Justice Modernisation and Abusive Domestic Behaviour Reviews (Scotland) Act 2025; Environmental Authorisations (Scotland) Amendment Regulations 2025; Sentencing Act 2026; Crime and Policing Act 2026; Prisoners (Early Release) (Miscellaneous Amendment and Transitional Provisions) (Scotland) Regulations 2026; National Security (State Threats) Act 2026
- Relates to: Proceeds of Crime (Scotland) Act 1995; Criminal Law (Consolidation) (Scotland) Act 1995; Criminal Procedure (Consequential Provisions) (Scotland) Act 1995

Status: Amended

Text of statute as originally enacted

Revised text of statute as amended

Text of the Criminal Procedure (Scotland) Act 1995 as in force today (including any amendments) within the United Kingdom, from legislation.gov.uk.

The Criminal Procedure (Scotland) Act 1995 (c. 46) is an act of the Parliament of the United Kingdom that consolidated enactments related to criminal procedure in Scotland.

The enactments consolidated by the act were repealed by section 6(1) of, and schedule 5 to, the Criminal Procedure (Consequential Provisions) (Scotland) Act 1995.

== Provisions ==
The act comprised 309 sections and 6 schedules. It consolidated provision for the conduct of criminal proceedings in Scotland, covering solemn procedure (trial on indictment before a judge and jury), summary procedure (trial before a sheriff or justice of the peace without a jury), and ancillary matters including bail, appeals, sentencing, and the treatment of offenders.
