= List of acts of the Parliament of the United Kingdom from 1995 =

This is a list of acts of the Parliament of the United Kingdom passed in 1995.

Acts passed since 1963 are cited by calendar year, as opposed to the convention used for earlier acts of citing the regnal year(s) in which the relevant parliamentary session was held. Each act passed in a respective year is given a chapter number (abbreviated "c."), denoted by Arabic numerals in the case of public general acts, lowercase Roman numerals in the case of local acts, or italicised Arabic numerals in the case of personal acts. These run as separate series.

65 acts of Parliament were passed in 1995: 54 public general acts and 11 local acts.

indicates that an act has been transcribed on Wikisource, indicates that an act is available to view at legislation.gov.uk, and indicates the location of the original act in the Parliamentary Archives.

== Public general acts ==
Short title	Citation	Royal assent
Long title
European Communities (Finance) Act 1995 (repealed)	1995 c. 1	16 January 1995
An Act to amend the definition of "the Treaties" and "the Community Treaties" in section 1(2) of the European Communities Act 1972 (Note: European Communities Act 1972 (c. 68)) so as to include the decision of 31st October 1994 of the Council on the Communities' system of own resources and so as to remove a spent provision. (Repealed by European Communities (Finance) Act 2001 (c. 22))
Consolidated Fund Act 1995 (repealed)	1995 c. 2	23 March 1995
An Act to apply certain sums out of the Consolidated Fund to the service of the years ending on 31st March 1994 and 1995. (Repealed by Appropriation Act 1997 (c. 31))
South Africa Act 1995	1995 c. 3	23 March 1995
An Act to make provision in connection with the re-admission of South Africa as a member of the Commonwealth.
Finance Act 1995	1995 c. 4	1 May 1995
An Act to grant certain duties, to alter other duties, and to amend the law relating to the National Debt and the Public Revenue, and to make further provision in connection with Finance.
Building Societies (Joint Account Holders) Act 1995	1995 c. 5	1 May 1995
An Act to secure the rights of second-named account holders in building society joint accounts; and for connected purposes.
Civil Evidence (Family Mediation) (Scotland) Act 1995	1995 c. 6	1 May 1995
An Act to make provision for the inadmissibility as evidence in civil proceedings in Scotland of information as to what occurred during family mediation.
Requirements of Writing (Scotland) Act 1995	1995 c. 7	1 May 1995
An Act to reform the law of Scotland with regard to the requirement of writing for certain matters and the formal validity of contractual and other documents and presumptions relating thereto; to abolish any rule of law restricting the proof of any matter to writ or oath and to abolish the procedure of reference to oath; and for connected purposes.
Agricultural Tenancies Act 1995	1995 c. 8	9 May 1995
An Act to make further provision with respect to tenancies which include agricultural land.
Commonwealth Development Corporation Act 1995 (repealed)	1995 c. 9	28 June 1995
An Act to alter the limits under sections 9A and 10 of the Commonwealth Development Corporation Act 1978; (Note: Commonwealth Development Corporation Act 1978 (c. 2)) to make provision in relation to interest on advances to the Commonwealth Development Corporation; and to make provision in relation to the remuneration, pensions and compensation of members of the Corporation. (Repealed by Commonwealth Development Corporation Act 1999 (c. 20))
Home Energy Conservation Act 1995	1995 c. 10	28 June 1995
An Act to make provision for the drawing up of local energy conservation reports in relation to residential accommodation; to give the Secretary of State functions in connection therewith; and for related purposes.
Proceeds of Crime Act 1995	1995 c. 11	28 June 1995
An Act to make further provision for and in relation to the recovery of the proceeds of criminal conduct; to make further provision for facilitating the enforcement of overseas forfeiture and restraint orders; and for connected purposes.
Carers (Recognition and Services) Act 1995	1995 c. 12	28 June 1995
An Act to provide for the assessment of the ability of carers to provide care; and for connected purposes.
Road Traffic (New Drivers) Act 1995	1995 c. 13	28 June 1995
An Act to make provision about newly qualified drivers who commit certain offences, including provision with respect to tests of competence to drive.
Land Registers (Scotland) Act 1995	1995 c. 14	28 June 1995
An Act to make prepayment of the appropriate statutory fees a condition of acceptance of writs for recording in the Register of Sasines and of applications for registration in the Land Register of Scotland.
Activity Centres (Young Persons' Safety) Act 1995	1995 c. 15	28 June 1995
An Act to make provision for the regulation of centres and providers of facilities where children and young persons under the age of 18 engage in adventure activities, including provision for the imposition of requirements relating to safety.
Prisoners (Return to Custody) Act 1995	1995 c. 16	28 June 1995
An Act to make provision, by the creation of an offence and the conferring of powers of entry, for the punishment and return to lawful custody of persons unlawfully at large.
Health Authorities Act 1995	1995 c. 17	28 June 1995
An Act to abolish Regional Health Authorities, District Health Authorities and Family Health Services Authorities, require the establishment of Health Authorities and make provision in relation to Health Authorities and Special Health Authorities and for connected purposes.
Jobseekers Act 1995	1995 c. 18	28 June 1995
An Act to provide for a jobseeker's allowance and to make other provision to promote the employment of the unemployed and the assistance of persons without a settled way of life.
Appropriation Act 1995 (repealed)	1995 c. 19	19 July 1995
An Act to apply a sum out of the Consolidated Fund to the service of the year ending on 31st March 1996; to appropriate the supplies granted in this Session of Parliament; and to repeal certain Consolidated Fund and Appropriation Acts. (Repealed by Appropriation Act 1997 (c. 31))
Criminal Justice (Scotland) Act 1995 (repealed)	1995 c. 20	19 July 1995
An Act to amend the criminal justice system of Scotland as respects criminal proceedings, the investigation of offences, the sentences and other disposals applicable in respect of certain offences, legal aid in relation to certain appeals, and the treatment of offenders; to amend the law of Scotland in relation to confiscation of the proceeds of, and forfeiture of property used in, crime; to make further provision as respects Scotland in relation to the preparation of jury lists for the purposes of criminal and civil trials; and for connected purposes. (Repealed by Criminal Procedure (Consequential Provisions) (Scotland) Act 1995 (c. 40))
Merchant Shipping Act 1995	1995 c. 21	19 July 1995
An Act to consolidate the Merchant Shipping Acts 1894 to 1994 and other enactments relating to merchant shipping.
Shipping and Trading Interests (Protection) Act 1995	1995 c. 22	19 July 1995
An Act to consolidate certain enactments for the protection of shipping and trading interests.
Goods Vehicles (Licensing of Operators) Act 1995	1995 c. 23	19 July 1995
An Act to consolidate Part V of the Transport Act 1968 (Note: Transport Act 1968 (c. 73)) and related provisions concerning the licensing of operators of certain goods vehicles.
Crown Agents Act 1995	1995 c. 24	19 July 1995
An Act to provide for the vesting of the property, rights and liabilities of the Crown Agents in a company nominated by the Secretary of State and for the subsequent dissolution of the Crown Agents; and for connected purposes.
Environment Act 1995	1995 c. 25	19 July 1995
An Act to provide for the establishment of a body corporate to be known as the Environment Agency and a body corporate to be known as the Scottish Environment Protection Agency; to provide for the transfer of functions, property, rights and liabilities to those bodies and for the conferring of other functions on them; to make provision with respect to contaminated land and abandoned mines; to make further provision in relation to National Parks; to make further provision for the control of pollution, the conservation of natural resources and the conservation or enhancement of the environment; to make provision for imposing obligations on certain persons in respect of certain products or materials; to make provision in relation to fisheries; to make provision for certain enactments to bind the Crown; to make provision with respect to the application of certain enactments in relation to the Isles of Scilly; and for connected purposes.
Pensions Act 1995	1995 c. 26	19 July 1995
An Act to amend the law about pensions and for connected purposes.
Geneva Conventions (Amendment) Act 1995	1995 c. 27	19 July 1995
An Act to make provision for the amendment of the Geneva Conventions Act 1957 (Note: Geneva Conventions Act 1957 (5 & 6 Eliz. 2. c. 52)) to enable effect to be given to the Protocols additional to the Geneva Conventions of 1949 done at Geneva on 10 June 1977; and for connected purposes.
Sale of Goods (Amendment) Act 1995	1995 c. 28	19 July 1995
An Act to amend the law relating to the sale of unascertained goods forming part of an identified bulk and the sale of undivided shares in goods.
Insurance Companies (Reserves) Act 1995 (repealed)	1995 c. 29	19 July 1995
An Act to provide for the maintenance by insurance companies of reserves in respect of certain classes of business; and for connected purposes. (Repealed by Financial Services and Markets Act 2000 (Consequential Amendments and Repeals) Order 2001 (SI 2001/3649))
Landlord and Tenant (Covenants) Act 1995	1995 c. 30	19 July 1995
An Act to make provision for persons bound by covenants of a tenancy to be released from such covenants on the assignment of the tenancy, and to make other provision with respect to rights and liabilities arising under such covenants; to restrict in certain circumstances the operation of rights of re-entry, forfeiture and disclaimer; and for connected purposes.
National Health Service (Amendment) Act 1995	1995 c. 31	19 July 1995
An Act to make provision in relation to persons disqualified, or subject to proceedings for disqualification, under section 46 of the National Health Service Act 1977; (Note: National Health Service Act 1977 (c. 49)) to make provision about the constitution of the tribunal under that section; to make corresponding provision for Scotland; and for connected purposes.
Olympic Symbol etc. (Protection) Act 1995	1995 c. 32	19 July 1995
An Act to make provision about the use for commercial purposes of the Olympic symbol and certain words associated with the Olympic games; and for connected purposes.
Licensing (Sunday Hours) Act 1995 (repealed)	1995 c. 33	19 July 1995
An Act to amend the provisions of the Licensing Act 1964 (Note: Licensing Act 1964 (c. 26)) relating to permitted hours in licensed premises and clubs on Sundays and Good Friday; and for connected purposes. (Repealed by Licensing Act 2003 (c. 17))
Child Support Act 1995	1995 c. 34	19 July 1995
An Act to make provision with respect to child support maintenance and other maintenance; and to provide for a child maintenance bonus.
Criminal Appeal Act 1995	1995 c. 35	19 July 1995
An Act to amend provisions relating to appeals and references to the Court of Appeal in criminal cases; to establish a Criminal Cases Review Commission and confer functions on, and make other provision in relation to, the Commission; to amend section 142 of the Magistrates' Courts Act 1980 (Note: Magistrates' Courts Act 1980 (c. 43)) and introduce in Northern Ireland provisions similar to those of that section; to amend section 133 of the Criminal Justice Act 1988; (Note: Criminal Justice Act 1988 (c. 33)) and for connected purposes.
Children (Scotland) Act 1995	1995 c. 36	19 July 1995
An Act to reform the law of Scotland relating to children, to the adoption of children and to young persons who as children have been looked after by a local authority; to make new provision as respects the relationship between parent and child and guardian and child in the law of Scotland; to make provision as respects residential establishments for children and certain other residential establishments; and for connected purposes.
Atomic Energy Authority Act 1995	1995 c. 37	8 November 1995
An Act to make provision for the transfer of property, rights and liabilities of the United Kingdom Atomic Energy Authority to other persons; and for connected purposes.
Civil Evidence Act 1995	1995 c. 38	8 November 1995
An Act to provide for the admissibility of hearsay evidence, the proof of certain documentary evidence and the admissibility and proof of official actuarial tables in civil proceedings; and for connected purposes.
Criminal Law (Consolidation) (Scotland) Act 1995	1995 c. 39	8 November 1995
An Act to consolidate for Scotland certain enactments creating offences and relating to criminal law there.
Criminal Procedure (Consequential Provisions) (Scotland) Act 1995	1995 c. 40	8 November 1995
An Act to make provision for repeals, consequential amendments, transitional and transitory matters and savings in connection with the consolidation of enactments in the Criminal Procedure (Scotland) Act 1995, (Note: Criminal Procedure (Scotland) Act 1995 (c. 46)) the Proceeds of Crime (Scotland) Act 1995 (Note: Proceeds of Crime (Scotland) Act 1995 (c. 43)) and the Criminal Law (Consolidation) (Scotland) Act 1995. (Note: Criminal Law (Consolidation) (Scotland) Act 1995 (c. 39))
Law Reform (Succession) Act 1995	1995 c. 41	8 November 1995
An Act to amend the law relating to the distribution of the estates of deceased persons and to make provision about the effect of the dissolution or annulment of marriages on wills and appointments of guardians.
Private International Law (Miscellaneous Provisions) Act 1995	1995 c. 42	8 November 1995
An Act to make provision about interest on judgment debts and arbitral awards expressed in a currency other than sterling; to make further provision as to marriages entered into by unmarried persons under a law which permits polygamy; to make provision for choice of law rules in tort and delict; and for connected purposes.
Proceeds of Crime (Scotland) Act 1995	1995 c. 43	8 November 1995
An Act to consolidate as regards Scotland certain enactments relating to the confiscation of the proceeds of, and forfeiture of property used in, crime.
Statute Law (Repeals) Act 1995	1995 c. 44	8 November 1995
An Act to promote the reform of the statute law by the repeal, in accordance with recommendations of the Law Commission and the Scottish Law Commission, of certain enactments which (except in so far as their effect is preserved) are no longer of practical utility, and to make other provision in connection with the repeal of those enactments.
Gas Act 1995	1995 c. 45	8 November 1995
An Act to amend Parts I and III of the Gas Act 1986; (Note: Gas Act 1986 (c. 44)) to make provision for requiring the owners of certain gas processing facilities to make them available to other persons; and for connected purposes.
Criminal Procedure (Scotland) Act 1995	1995 c. 46	8 November 1995
An Act to consolidate certain enactments relating to criminal procedure in Scotland.
Northern Ireland (Remission of Sentences) Act 1995	1995 c. 47	8 November 1995
An Act to provide for the release on licence of persons serving sentences to which section 14 of the Northern Ireland (Emergency Provisions) Act 1991 (Note: Northern Ireland (Emergency Provisions) Act 1991 (c. 24)) applies; and for connected purposes.
Charities (Amendment) Act 1995 (repealed)	1995 c. 48	8 November 1995
An Act to make provision for the treatment of two or more charities as a single charity for all or any of the purposes of the Charities Act 1993. (Note: Charities Act 1993 (c. 10)) (Repealed by Charities Act 2011 (c. 25))
Town and Country Planning (Costs of Inquiries etc.) Act 1995 (repealed)	1995 c. 49	8 November 1995
An Act to make provision authorising or requiring certain local authorities with functions under the enactments relating to Town and Country Planning to make to, or to persons appointed by, certain Ministers of the Crown, or to persons appointed by those authorities, payments in respect of the administrative cost of, or otherwise connected with, certain local inquiries or other hearings, examinations in public, or the consideration of certain objections, under those enactments; to validate the imposition by such Ministers on those authorities of requirements to make such payments, and the making by those authorities of such payments, whether before or after the passing of this Act; to make provision with respect to the remuneration and allowances payable to persons appointed to hold such local inquiries or other proceedings; and for connected purposes. (Repealed by Statute Law (Repeals) Act 2008 (c. 12))
Disability Discrimination Act 1995	1995 c. 50	8 November 1995
An Act to make it unlawful to discriminate against disabled persons in connection with employment, the provision of goods, facilities and services or the disposal or management of premises; to make provision about the employment of disabled persons; and to establish a National Disability Council.
Medical (Professional Performance) Act 1995	1995 c. 51	8 November 1995
An Act to amend the Medical Act 1983 (Note: Medical Act 1983 (c. 54)) to make provision relating to the professional performance of registered medical practitioners and the voluntary removal of names from the register of medical practitioners; to amend section 42 of that Act; and for connected purposes.
Mental Health (Patients in the Community) Act 1995	1995 c. 52	8 November 1995
An Act to make provision for certain mentally disordered patients in England and Wales to receive after-care under supervision after leaving hospital; to provide for the making of community care orders in the case of certain mentally disordered patients in Scotland; to amend the law relating to mentally disordered patients absent without leave or on leave of absence from hospital; and for connected purposes.
Criminal Injuries Compensation Act 1995	1995 c. 53	8 November 1995
An Act to provide for the establishment of a scheme for compensation for criminal injuries.
Consolidated Fund (No. 2) Act 1995 (repealed)	1995 c. 54	19 December 1995
An Act to apply certain sums out of the Consolidated Fund to the service of the years ending on 31st March 1996 and 1997. (Repealed by Appropriation Act 1997 (c. 31))

== Local acts ==
Short title	Citation	Royal assent
Long title
British Waterways Act 1995	1995 c. i	16 January 1995
An Act to confer powers on the British Waterways Board to enter land and repair or maintain, or carry out other operations with respect to, the waterways owned or managed by them and other works; to confer further powers on the Board for the regulation and management of their waterways and in relation to their undertaking; to amend or repeal statutory provisions relating to the Board or their undertaking; and for other purposes.
Letchworth Garden City Heritage Foundation Act 1995	1995 c. ii	1 May 1995
An Act to provide for the dissolution of Letchworth Garden City Corporation and the vesting of their undertaking in a society registered under the Industrial and Provident Societies Act 1965; (Note: Industrial and Provident Societies Act 1965 (c. 12)) to repeal the Letchworth Garden City Corporation Act 1962; (Note: Letchworth Garden City Corporation Act 1962 (10 & 11 Eliz. 2. c. xxxix)) and for connected purposes.
Malvern Hills Act 1995	1995 c. iii	28 June 1995
An Act to amend certain enactments relating to the Malvern Hills Conservators and the management of the Malvern Hills; to confer further powers on the Malvern Hills Conservators; to make further provision in relation to the Malvern Hills; and for other purposes.
Bell's Bridge Order Confirmation Act 1995	1995 c. iv	19 July 1995
An Act to confirm a Provisional Order under the Private Legislation Procedure (Scotland) Act 1936, (Note: Private Legislation Procedure (Scotland) Act 1936 (26 Geo. 5 & 1 Edw. 8. c. 52)) relating to Bell's Bridge.
	Bell's Bridge Order 1995 Provisional Order to empower Scottish Enterprise to construct works to make Bell's Bridge a permanent footbridge over the river Clyde; and for related purposes.	
Sheffield Assay Office Act 1995	1995 c. v	19 July 1995
An Act to amend section 16 of the Hallmarking Act 1973 (Note: Hallmarking Act 1973 (c. 43)) in its application to the Sheffield Assay Office; to extend the functions of the Office; and for other purposes incidental thereto.
Birmingham Assay Office Act 1995	1995 c. vi	19 July 1995
An Act to amend section 16 of the Hallmarking Act 1973 in its application to the Birmingham Assay Office; to extend the functions of the Office; and for other purposes incidental thereto.
Loch Leven and Lochaber Water Power Order Confirmation Act 1995	1995 c. vii	8 November 1995
An Act to confirm a Provisional Order under the Private Legislation Procedure (Scotland) Act 1936, relating to Loch Leven and Lochaber Water Power.
	Loch Leven and Lochaber Water Power Order 1995 Provisional Order to amend the Loch Leven Water Power Act 1901, (Note: Loch Leven Water Power Act 1901 (1 Edw. 7. c. cclxx)) the Loch Leven Water Power (Transfer) Order 1910 and the Lochaber Water Power Acts 1921 to 1984; (Note: Lochaber Water Power Act 1921 (11 & 12 Geo. 5. c. xliv)) (Note: Lochaber Water Power Act 1930 (20 & 21 Geo. 5. c. cx)) to enable the transfer of the undertaking of the Lochaber Power Company to Alcan Aluminium UK Limited; and for other purposes.	
Accommodation Level Crossings Act 1995	1995 c. viii	8 November 1995
An Act to make further provision with respect to offences of failing to secure gates on certain railways.
Queen Mary and Westfield College Act 1995	1995 c. ix	8 November 1995
An Act to unite The Medical College of St. Bartholomew's Hospital in the City of London and The London Hospital Medical College with Queen Mary and Westfield College, University of London; to provide for the transfer to Queen Mary and Westfield College of rights, properties, assets and obligations of those other Colleges; and for connected and other purposes.
London Local Authorities Act 1995	1995 c. x	8 November 1995
An Act to confer further powers upon local authorities in London; and for other purposes.
Church of Scotland (Property and Endowments) Amendment Order Confirmation Act 1995	1995 c. xi	19 December 1995
An Act to confirm a Provisional Order under the Private Legislation Procedure (Scotland) Act 1936, relating to Church of Scotland (Property and Endowments) Amendment.
	Church of Scotland (Property and Endowments) Amendment Order 1995 Provisional Order to amend the Church of Scotland (Property and Endowments) Act 1925 (Note: Church of Scotland (Property and Endowments) Act 1925 (15 & 16 Geo. 5. c. 33)) and the Church of Scotland (Property and Endowments) Amendment Act 1933, (Note: Church of Scotland (Property and Endowments) Amendment Act 1933 (23 & 24 Geo. 5. c. 44)) and to modify the effect of certain Orders made under the Churches (Scotland) Act 1905, (Note: Churches (Scotland) Act 1905 (5 Edw. 7. c. 12)) so as to increase the discretionary powers of the General Assembly of the Church of Scotland in relation to certain property and endowments of the Church.	

== See also ==
- List of acts of the Parliament of the United Kingdom
