= Criminal Justice (Terrorism and Conspiracy) Act 1998 =

Act of the Parliament of the United Kingdom

Criminal Justice (Terrorism and Conspiracy) Act 1998 (Note: Section 11.)
- Act of Parliament
- Parliament of the United Kingdom
- Long title: An Act to make provision about procedure and forfeiture in relation to offences concerning proscribed organisations, and about conspiracy to commit offences outside the United Kingdom.
- Citation: 1998 c. 40
- Territorial extent: United Kingdom (Note: Section 10.)

Dates
- Royal assent: 3 September 1998
- Commencement: 3 September 1998 (Note: Section 4(b) of the Interpretation Act 1978.)
Other legislation
Amends	Criminal Law Act 1977; Criminal Attempts and Conspiracy (Northern Ireland) Order 1983; Criminal Justice Act 1988; Prevention of Terrorism (Temporary Provisions) Act 1989; Computer Misuse Act 1990; Criminal Justice Act 1993; Drug Trafficking Act 1994; Criminal Law (Consolidation) (Scotland) Act 1995; Proceeds of Crime (Scotland) Act 1995; Criminal Procedure (Scotland) Act 1995; Sexual Offences (Conspiracy and Incitement) Act 1996; Criminal Justice (Northern Ireland) Order 1996
Repeals/revokes	Prevention of Terrorism (Temporal Provisions) Act 1974
Amended by	Terrorism Act 2000; Criminal Justice and Immigration Act 2008; Sexual Offences (Scotland) Act 2009
Relates to	Terrorism Act 2000; Criminal Justice Act 1999 (Ireland)

Status: Amended

History of passage through Parliament

Text of statute as originally enacted

Revised text of statute as amended

The Criminal Justice (Terrorism and Conspiracy) Act 1998 (c. 40) is an act of the Parliament of the United Kingdom, which came into force on 4 September 1998. It stipulated that it is an offence to participate in a conspiracy to carry out a course of conduct that leads to an offence in another jurisdiction. It gave courts in England and Wales the authority to try conspiracies to commit offences abroad. The law also provided stricter punishment for being a member of a terror group. Parts of it were replaced by the Terrorism Act 2000 and the Proceeds of Crime Act passed in 2002.

== Background ==
The act was adopted after the August 15, 1998 Real IRA bombing in Omagh, Northern Ireland. It followed statutes drafted in response to acts of terrorism such as the Prevention of Terrorism (Temporal Provisions) Act 1974 introduced following the 1974 Birmingham bombings. During the parliamentary debate, then Prime Minister Tony Blair said that the decision to include the offence was made as part of the government's total commitment to defeating terrorism wherever it is plotted or executed. A related law called Criminal Justice Act 1999 was also passed in Ireland in response to the Omagh bombing.

Several other laws combating terrorism were introduced afterward and a number of these replaced parts of the Criminal Justice Act. For instance, the terrorism provisions (sections 1-4) have been repealed and incorporated in the Terrorism Act 2000, leaving the conspiracy provisions (sections 5-7). The high number of terrorism-related statutes is attributed to the emergent legal activism in the UK, which is driven by the fear on the part of legislators of being blamed for inaction after the incidence of a terror event. There is also the public's increasing willingness to give up civil liberties in favor of counter-terrorism.

== Offence ==
In the legislation, an act would constitute an offence to conspire to carry out an offence in another jurisdiction if:

- the conduct would also amount to an offence in England and Wales; and
- a party to the conspiracy or his agent does something in England or Wales in relation to it before its formation; or
- a party became a party to the conspiracy in England or Wales; or
- a party to the conspiracy did or omitted to do something in England or Wales in pursuance of the agreement.

An offender accused of violating the Criminal Justice (Terrorism and Conspiracy) Act 1998 was charged contrary to s1(A) of the Criminal Law Act 1977.

Section 8 of the act required the Secretary of State to report before Parliament the working of the statute at least once every year. This particular provision was abolished in 2002 based on a recommendation that the annual review did not contribute any real value to scrutinising how the act was working.

== Criticism ==
There were critics who argued that the provisions of the Criminal Justice Act were obscurely worded and were hastily introduced in response to the Omagh bombing incident as well as the terrorist activities in Dar es Salaam and Kenya, which transpired prior to the law's passage. In a briefing, the Belfast-based Committee on the Administration of Justice (CAJ) stated that the legislation was not only draconian but it also violated the UK's human rights obligations under international law.
