= Laws regarding rape =

Laws relating to the crime of rape

Rape is a type of sexual assault initiated by one or more persons against another person without that person's consent. The act may be carried out by physical force, under threat or manipulation, by impersonation, or with a person who is incapable of giving valid consent.

Definitions of rape vary, but they generally require some degree of sexual penetration without consent. The term "consent" varies by law as well. Minors, for example, are often considered too young to consent to sexual relations with older persons (see statutory rape and age of consent). Consent is also considered invalid if obtained under duress, or from a person who does not have the ability to understand the nature of the act, due to factors such as young age, mental disability, or substance intoxication.

Many jurisdictions, such as Canada and several US and Australian states, no longer have a traditional common law offence of rape, which always required that sexual penetration had occurred. Some of these jurisdictions instead have created new statutory offences, such as sexual assault or criminal sexual conduct, which criminalise sexual contact without consent, and without any requirement that sexual intercourse occurred.

== Terminology and definitions ==
=== Classification ===
Depending on the jurisdiction, rape may be characterized as a sexual offence (Note: For example, by the Sexual Offences Act 1956 and the Sexual Offences Act 2003) or an offence against the person. (Note: For example, by the Offences against the Person Act 1828, the Offences against the Person Act 1861 and the Visiting Forces Act 1952) Rape may also be characterized as a form of aggravated assault or battery, or both, indecent assault (Note: For example, in England and Wales before the enactment of the Sexual Offences Act 2003: R v Hodgson [1973] QB 565 (indecent assault on a woman held to be an alternative verdict to rape in a case where the accused was acquitted of rape on grounds of the consent of the victim, who was aged under 16, which was not, by virtue of section 14(2) of the Sexual Offences Act 1956, a defence to indecent assault)) or sexual assault (Note: For example, in England and Wales after the enactment of the Sexual Offences Act 2003) or battery, or both.

=== Actus reus ===
To sustain a conviction, rape might require proof that the defendant had sexual penetration with another person. Depending on the jurisdiction, the actus reus of rape may consist of "having carnal knowledge of" a woman, (Note: For example, under the common law of England, and at common law in Scotland) or "having sexual intercourse with" a woman (including a girl) specifically, (Note: For example, under the Sexual Offences (Amendment) Act 1976 as read with section 46 of the Sexual Offences Act 1956) or either a woman or a man (including a girl or a boy) generally, (Note: For example, under section 1 of the Sexual Offences Act 1956, as substituted by section 142 of the Criminal Justice and Public Order Act 1994, and read with section 46 of the former mentioned Act) or engaging in sexual intercourse with a person (which term includes an intersex person who might arguably be neither a woman nor a man) (Note: For example, under section 261 of the California Penal Code,) or having "sexual connection" with a person affected by penile penetration of that person's genitalia, (Note: For example, under section 128(2) of the Crimes Act 1961) or penile penetration of the vagina, anus or mouth (these terms construed as including surgically constructed organs) of a person. (Note: For example, under section 1 of the Sexual Offences Act 2003)

In Prosecutor v. Anto Furundžija, the International Criminal Tribunal for the former Yugoslavia included fellatio in the definition of rape, because [para 183]: "The Trial Chamber holds that the forced penetration of the mouth by the male sexual organ constitutes a most humiliating and degrading attack upon human dignity. The essence of the whole corpus of international humanitarian law as well as human rights law lies in the protection of the human dignity of every person, whatever his or her gender."

=== Mens rea ===
Countries around the world differ in how they deal with the mens rea element in the law regarding rape, (i.e. the belief of the accused that the victim is not consenting or might not be consenting), and in how they place the onus of proof with regard to belief of consent.

For example, under the Sexual Offences Act 2003, the belief must be "reasonable" and "Whether a belief is reasonable is to be determined having regard to all the circumstances, including any steps A has taken to ascertain whether B consents."

In some jurisdictions the mens rea is quite complex, such as in New South Wales, where the law reads:

Section 61HA Consent in relation to sexual assault offences

(3) Knowledge about consent

A person who has sexual intercourse with another person without the consent of the other person knows that the other person does not consent to the sexual intercourse if:

- (a) the person knows that the other person does not consent to the sexual intercourse, or
- (b) the person is reckless as to whether the other person consents to the sexual intercourse, or
- (c) the person has no reasonable grounds for believing that the other person consents to the sexual intercourse.

For the purpose of making any such finding, the trier of fact must have regard to all the circumstances of the case:

- (d) including any steps taken by the person to ascertain whether the other person consents to the sexual intercourse, but
- (e) not including any self-induced intoxication of the person.

The Explanatory Report of the Istanbul Convention, states at para 189: "The interpretation of the word 'intentionally' is left to domestic law, but the requirement for intentional conduct relates to all the elements of the offence." [in regard to Article 36 of the convention – Sexual violence, including rape].

=== Attendant circumstances ===
Rape has been defined so as to require proof that the sexual act in question was done without the victim's consent, (Note: For example, by section 1 of the Sexual Offences Act 2003) or so as to require proof that it was done either without their consent or, alternatively, against their will. (Note: For example, by section 261 of the California Penal Code)

There is not always a requirement that the victim did not consent. In the England and Wales, section 5 of the Sexual Offences Act 2003 creates the offence of "rape of a child under 13" and contains no reference to consent. After describing the sexual act the offence prohibits, the explanatory notes to the Act say "whether or not the child consented to this act is irrelevant."

In M. C. v. Bulgaria, the European Court of Human Rights ruled that the victim does not necessarily have to resist physically for the crime of rape to be committed [para 166]:

[T]he Court is persuaded that any rigid approach to the prosecution of sexual offences, such as requiring proof of physical resistance in all circumstances, risks leaving certain types of rape unpunished and thus jeopardising the effective protection of the individual's sexual autonomy. In accordance with contemporary standards and trends in that area, the member States' positive obligations under Articles 3 and 8 of the Convention [Convention for the Protection of Human Rights and Fundamental Freedoms] must be seen as requiring the penalisation and effective prosecution of any non-consensual sexual act, including in the absence of physical resistance by the victim.

Some circumstances, such as where the victim is kidnapped or in detention, or under conditions of war or genocide, may be viewed as so coercive, that they presume non-consent altogether; for example in ICTY, The Prosecutor v. Kunarac, Kovac and Vukovic, it was ruled, in regard to the rape during the Bosnian War, where women were kept in detention centers, under extremely harsh conditions, and were selected for sex by soldiers and policemen, that [para 132]: "Such detentions amount to circumstances that were so coercive as to negate any possibility of consent."

The issue arises in law as who can legally consent, for example with regard to persons who suffer from mental or physical disability. Although laws differ by jurisdiction, emerging international standards suggest that a person's mental or physical disability, should not, in and of itself, render the sexual interaction illegal, but rather the exploitation or abuse of such disability by the perpetrator should do so: in the European Union, the Directive 2011/93/EU of the European Parliament and of the Council of 13 December 2011 reads (with regard to the determination of legal consent of a child who is above the age of consent): "(10) Disability, by itself, does not automatically constitute an impossibility to consent to sexual relations. However, the abuse of the existence of such a disability in order to engage in sexual activities with a child should be criminalised."

=== Redefinitions and statute ===
==== General ====
From the second part of the 20th century onwards, the crime of rape has undergone major changes in definition in many countries, especially in Western countries. It has evolved from its narrow traditional definition of forced penetration of a vagina by a penis, outside of marriage, to a broader definition, which includes forced sex in marriage (marital rape), and may also include other sexual acts (such as anal or oral sexual penetration); the latter were traditionally dealt with under sodomy laws. This redefinition of rape had the effect of defining rape of males, in particular female-on-male rape (made to penetrate). There have also been changes in the legal definition of consent/coercion.

Two different changes have been made in recent decades in many jurisdictions in regard to the criminal offense of rape as it relates to marital status:

- the criminalization of rape between spouses ('marital rape').
- the removal of the stipulation that, if after the act of rape the victim and the perpetrator marry each other, the prosecution ends ('marry-your-rapist law').

==== Marital rape ====
Throughout much of the history, rape in marriage was not a crime. Most cultures subscribed to the idea of the existence of 'conjugal rights' to sexual intercourse with one's spouse, and, until well into the 20th century, most legal systems generally accepted, overtly or tacitly, that such 'rights' could be taken by force, against the will of the wife. Traditional understanding and views of marriage, rape, sexuality, gender roles and self determination have started to be challenged in most Western countries during the 1960s and 1970s, which has led to the subsequent criminalization of marital rape during the following decades. With a few notable exceptions, it was during the past 30 years when most laws against marital rape have been enacted. Several countries in Eastern Europe and Scandinavia made spousal rape illegal before 1970, but other countries in Western Europe and the English-speaking Western World outlawed it much later, mostly in the 1980s and 1990s.

Marital rape is included in the 1993 Declaration on the Elimination of Violence Against Women as a form of violence against women, which reads:

Violence against women shall be understood to encompass, but not be limited to, the following: (a) Physical, sexual and psychological violence occurring in the family, including battering, sexual abuse of female children in the household, dowry-related violence, marital rape, female genital mutilation and other traditional practices harmful to women, non-spousal violence and violence related to exploitation ...

It is also included in the Council of Europe Recommendation Rec(2002)5 of the Committee of Ministers to member states on the protection of women against violence, which reads:

This [violence against women] includes, but is not limited to, the following: a. violence occurring in the family or domestic unit, including, inter alia, physical and mental aggression, emotional and psychological abuse, rape and sexual abuse, incest, rape between spouses, regular or occasional partners and cohabitants, crimes committed in the name of honour, female genital and sexual mutilation and other traditional practices harmful to women, such as forced marriages ...

In addition, the World Health Organization, defines sexual violence as: "any sexual act, attempt to obtain a sexual act, unwanted sexual comments or advances, or acts to traffic, or otherwise directed, against a person's sexuality using coercion, by any person regardless of their relationship to the victim, in any setting, including but not limited to home and work."

The countries which choose to ratify the Council of Europe Convention on preventing and combating violence against women and domestic violence, the first legally binding instrument in Europe in the field of violence against women, are bound by its provisions to ensure that non-consensual sexual acts committed against a spouse or partner are illegal. The convention came into force in August 2014.

==== Marry-your-rapist laws ====
A marry-your-rapist law or rape-marriage law states that a rapist will not be prosecuted if they marry their victim. Although the terms for this phenomenon were only coined in the 2010s, the practice has been supported by the rape laws in many legal systems throughout history. In the late 20th and early 21st century, the remaining laws of this type were increasingly challenged and repealed in a series of countries.

==== As a crime of abduction ====
Originally, in Ancient Rome, 'rape' was a crime-defining primarily the act of a male abducting a female without the consent of the man under whose authority she was (typically father or husband); sexual intercourse was not necessary. Furthermore, in many legal systems (such as 17th century France) the consent of the woman to sexual intercourse was not a defense – the act was still a crime if done without the consent of her father. While the laws on rape differed by historical period and culture, some elements were common to most jurisdictions until the second part of the 20th century (when rape laws underwent major changes): "rape" was a crime that could be committed only between parties who were not married to each other, and only by a male against a female.

== Punishment ==
=== Punishment of assailants ===
Punishment for rape in most countries today is imprisonment. Controversially, some U.S. jurisdictions allow shorter sentences for sex criminals who agree to voluntary chemical castration.

In the past, rape was often punished with death, and it is punishable by death in at least nine countries today: China, Afghanistan, United Arab Emirates, Egypt, Iran, Saudi Arabia, Pakistan, and North Korea. In some of these instances, special circumstances apply. For example, rape is only punishable by death in India if the victim dies or is put in a persistent vegetative state, and/or if the rapist is a repeat offender, and in Iran, a death sentence for rape can be substituted with compensation, with or without imprisonment and flogging, if the victim so chooses.

In 1977, in Coker v. Georgia the Supreme Court of the United States held that the death penalty for the crime of rape of an adult woman was cruel and unusual punishment, and thus banned it as a violation of the Eighth Amendment to the United States Constitution. In 2008 in Kennedy v. Louisiana it ruled the same in regard to rape of a child.

Prison sentences for rape are not uniform. A study made by the U.S. Department of Justice of prison releases in 1992, involving about 80 percent of the prison population, found that the average sentence for convicted rapists was 9.8 years, while the actual time served was 5.4 years. This follows the typical pattern of violent crimes in the US, where those convicted typically serve no more than half of their sentence.

Between 2002 and 2003, more than one in ten convicted rapists in Victoria, Australia, served a wholly suspended sentence, and the average total effective sentence for rape was seven years. In the Republic of Ireland, the average sentence given for rape is 5–7 years.

=== Punishment of victims ===
Some societies punish the victims of rape as well as the perpetrators. According to such cultures, being raped dishonors the victim and, in many cases, the victim's family. In some countries (e.g. Libya, Afghanistan) rape victims are sometimes killed to restore honor to the family's name.

Certain cultures have historically promoted a system of honor, dishonor, and shame, which was applied with particular strictness to females. A victim of rape would be considered to have lost her honorable reputation and place in society, a loss of honor which entailed shame on the woman's family group as well. In early ancient Rome, ancient China, and other cultures, a pressure has existed which has led women to commit suicide after becoming victims of rape. In the Shakespeare drama Titus Andronicus, the title character kills his raped, maimed daughter in what he believes to be a mercy killing. Likewise, the suicide of female rape victims for reasons of shame is also historically documented in Chinese and Japanese culture.

In countries which outlaw fornication or adultery, rape victims may become subject to these laws (if they cannot prove the rape case and/or if it is revealed they were not virgins at the time of the assault – in the case of unmarried victims).

== International guidelines, recommendations, and obligations ==
In recent years, there have been various guidelines and recommendations from international human rights organizations in regard to rape and sexual violence. One view that is advanced is that the offense of 'rape' should be replaced with a broader offense of "sexual assault." For instance, the Handbook for Legislation on Violence against Women from the UN Department of Economic and Social Affairs Division for the Advancement of Women gives these suggestions about legislation on sexual violence:

Legislation should:

- Define sexual assault as a violation of bodily integrity and sexual autonomy;
- Replace existing offences of rape and "indecent" assault with a broad offence of sexual assault graded based on harm;
- Provide for aggravating circumstances including, but not limited to, the age of the survivor, the relationship of the perpetrator and survivor, the use or threat of violence, the presence of multiple perpetrators, and grave physical or mental consequences of the attack on the victim;
- Remove any requirement that sexual assault be committed by force or violence, and any requirement of proof of penetration, and minimize secondary victimization of the complainant/survivor in proceedings by enacting a definition of sexual assault that either:
  - Requires the existence of "unequivocal and voluntary agreement" and requiring proof by the accused of steps taken to ascertain whether the complainant/survivor was consenting; or
  - Requires that the act take place in "coercive circumstances" and includes a broad range of coercive circumstances; and
- Specifically criminalize sexual assault within a relationship (i.e., "marital rape"), either by:
  - Providing that sexual assault provisions apply "irrespective of the nature of the relationship" between the perpetrator and complainant; or
  - Stating that "no marriage or other relationship shall constitute a defence to a charge of sexual assault under the legislation."

The Council of Europe Convention on preventing and combating violence against women and domestic violence, also known as the Istanbul Convention, which creates legally binding obligations for countries which choose to ratify it, reads:

Article 36 – Sexual violence, including rape

1. Parties shall take the necessary legislative or other measures to ensure that the following intentional conducts are criminalised:
  1. engaging in non-consensual vaginal, anal or oral penetration of a sexual nature of the body of another person with any bodily part or object;
  2. engaging in other non-consensual acts of a sexual nature with a person;
  3. causing another person to engage in non-consensual acts of a sexual nature with a third person.
2. Consent must be given voluntarily as the result of the person's free will assessed in the context of the surrounding circumstances.
3. Parties shall take the necessary legislative or other measures to ensure that the provisions of paragraph 1 also apply to acts committed against former or current spouses or partners as recognised by internal law.

Article 36 must also be read together with Article 43 which reads:

Article 43 – Application of criminal offences

- The offences established in accordance with this Convention shall apply irrespective of the nature of the relationship between victim and perpetrator.

== Laws by country ==
=== Common law countries ===
Rape was an offense under the common law of England. That offense became an offense under the law of other countries, including Australia and the United States, as a result of colonization or conquest, or the following cession (see British Empire). It is discussed at Rape in English law § History.

Under this law, rape traditionally describes the act of a male forcing a female to have sexual intercourse (sexual penetration of the vagina by the penis) with him. Common law rape required the utmost physical resistance by the victim, as well as substantial force by the defendant. Until the late twentieth century, spousal rape was not considered a true rape case because both spouses were deemed to have consented to a lifelong sexual relationship through the wedding vows. However, with changes to the marital rape exemption, as well as with the significant development of women's rights, the belief of a marital right to force sexual intercourse has become less widely held.

Rape was also an offense at common law in Scotland. This offense was not derived from the English offense as Scotland retained its own system of criminal law under the terms of the Acts of Union 1707.

=== Bangladesh ===
Section 375 of the Bangladesh Penal Code highlights rape. The Prevention of Violence Against Women and Children Act, 2000, defines rape specifically concerning women and children.

In Bangladesh, the legal definition of rape is specific. It is a gender-based crime committed exclusively by males against females, involving penile-vaginal non-consensual intercourse. Other forms of penetration, including anal or oral, and penetrations by objects, are not recognized as rape under the law. Under Section 375 of the Penal Code, women cannot be tried as perpetrators of rape.

Rape

375. A man is said to commit "rape" who except in the case hereinafter excepted, has sexual intercourse with a woman under circumstances falling under any of the five following descriptions:
  - Firstly. Against her will.
  - Secondly. Without her consent.
  - Thirdly. With her consent, when her consent has been obtained by putting her in fear of death, or of hurt.
  - Fourthly. With her consent, when the man knows that he is not her husband, and that her consent is given because she believes that he is another man to whom she is or believes herself to be lawfully married.
  - Fifthly. With or without her consent, when she is under fourteen years of age.
  - Explanation. Penetration is sufficient to constitute the sexual intercourse necessary to the offence of rape.
  - Exception. Sexual intercourse by a man with his own wife, the wife not being under thirteen years of age, is not rape.

=== Bhutan ===
Chapter 14 (Sexual Offenses) of the 2004 Penal Code of Bhutan outlaws rape and other sexual offenses. Under the criminal code, there are several categories of rape, which are punished differently, depending on factors such as the age of the victim, the relationship between the victim and the perpetrator, the number of participants (gang rape), whether the victim was pregnant, whether injury occurred. Marital rape is also recognized as an offense under the 2004 laws, being classified as a petty misdemeanour. The most serious form of rape is gang rape of a child under twelve years of age, classified as a felony of the first degree.

Rape

177. A defendant shall be guilty of the offence of rape, if the defendant has sexual intercourse with another person:
  - (a) Without the person's consent or with consent, when consent is obtained by putting the person or a third person in fear of death or of grievous hurt;
  - (b) Compels the other person to submit to sexual intercourse by force, or by threat of imminent death, bodily injury or serious bodily injury or the commission of a felony to that person or a third person;
  - (c) Substantially impairs the other persons ability to appraise or control the conduct by administering drugs, intoxicants, or other substances without consent for the purpose of preventing the person's resistance to the sexual intercourse, or
  - (d) Renders the other person unconscious for the purpose of committing sexual intercourse

The most serious sexual offense is gang rape of a child under 12.

Gang rape of a child below twelve years of age

191. A defendant shall be guilty of the offence of gang rape of a child below the age of twelve years, when two or more persons engage in a sexual intercourse with a child below the age of twelve years. Grading of Gang rape of a child below twelve years of age
192. The offence of gang rape of a child below twelve years of age shall be a felony of the first degree

Marital rape is illegal:

Marital rape

- A defendant shall be guilty of marital rape, if the defendant engages in sexual intercourse with one's own spouse without consent or against the will of the other spouse. Grading of Marital rape
- The offence of marital rape shall be a petty misdemeanour.

=== Canada ===
The Criminal Code does not contain an offence of "rape," which historically required proof of penile penetration for a conviction. Instead, the law criminalizes "sexual assault," which is defined as sexual contact with another person without that other person's consent. The offence of sexual assault is broader than the historical offence of rape. Proof of penetration is not required to ground the offence of sexual assault, nor is the offence gender specific. Consent is defined in section 273.1(1) of the Criminal Code as "the voluntary agreement of the complainant to engage in the sexual activity in question."

=== France ===
In the French penal code, any act of sexual penetration, whatever its nature, committed against another person or on the perpetrator, by violence, constraint, threat or surprise, is rape. Rape is punished by a maximum of fifteen years' criminal imprisonment.

Rape is punished by a maximum of twenty years' criminal imprisonment in certain aggravating factors (including victim under age of 15).

Rape is punished by a maximum of thirty years' criminal imprisonment where it caused the death of the victim.

Rape is punished by a maximum of imprisonment for life when it is preceded, accompanied or followed by torture or acts of barbarity.

=== Ireland ===
In Republic of Ireland law, there are two separate offences of rape:

- "rape [at common law]," restricted to vaginal penetration by penis
- "rape under section 4 [of the Criminal Law (Rape) (Amendment) Act 1990 as amended]," for anal or oral penetration by penis, or vaginal penetration by inanimate object

The offences have the same penalty, of life imprisonment, and the same provisions regarding conduct of trials, except that rape under section 4 is an alternative verdict in a rape trial, but not conversely.

The common law offence was codified by the Offences against the Person Act 1861 and the Criminal Law (Rape) Act 1981. A statutory definition was introduced by section 2(1) of the 1981 act; as amended it states:

A man commits rape if—

- (a) he has sexual intercourse with a woman who at the time of the intercourse does not consent to it, and
- (b) at that time he knows that she does not consent to the intercourse or he is reckless as to whether she does or does not consent to it,

and references to rape in this Act and any other enactment shall be construed accordingly.

The act also restricted reference to the alleged victim's past sexual history, and provided anonymity for both parties. Originally, the act referred to "unlawful sexual intercourse"; the word unlawful, intended to preserve the exemption for marital rape, was deleted by the 1990 act.

Section 4 of the 1990 act defines "rape under section 4" as follows:

In this Act "rape under section 4" means a sexual assault that includes—

- (a) penetration (however slight) of the anus or mouth by the penis, or
- (b) penetration (however slight) of the vagina by any object held or manipulated by another person.

By section 2 of the 1990 act, "sexual assault" is defined in terms of "indecent assault," which is not otherwise defined. The 1988 Law Reform Commission (LRC) report on "rape and allied offences," on which the 1990 act was based, recommended expanding the common-law definition rather than creating a new offence, and the inclusion of penetration of the anus in the scope of section 4(b). The 1990 act mandated that trials for both rape offences be at the Central Criminal Court, removed the rule that males under 14 were considered incapable of sexual offences, and relaxed the obligation to warn the jury about an alleged victim's uncorroborated testimony. It also specifies that failure to offer resistance is not evidence of consent.

=== Greece ===
Penal Code, Art. 336 par. 1 creates the offence of rape. It reads:

1. Whoever with physical violence or with threat of grave and direct danger forces another to intercourse or to tolerance or action of an indecent act, is punished with incarceration.

In 2019 a new paragraph was added (Art. 336 par. 5), practically making lack of consent the sole criterion for rape. It reads:

5. Whoever, apart from the case of paragraph 1, attempts intercourse without the consent of the victim, is punished with incarceration of up to ten years.

Marital rape was made illegal in 2006.

=== Guatemala ===
The 2009 Law against Sexual Violence, Exploitation, and Trafficking in Persons defines rape as follows:

Rape

Whoever, by physical or psychological violence, has vaginal, anal, or oral sexual intercourse with another person, or inserts any body part or object by these methods, or compels another to do so, shall be punished with imprisonment from eight to twelve years. Also, the offense is committed when a victim is a person younger than fourteen years, or a person with a volitional or cognitive impairment, even in the absence of physical or psychological violence. The penalty shall be imposed without prejudice to the penalties that may apply for the commission of other offenses.

=== India ===
In 2019, the Indian Supreme Court ruled that sex on a false promise of marriage constitutes rape.

=== Iran ===
Defined as "any sexual act without full, voluntary consent from an adult or any sexual act with a minor", the sentence for a rape case in Iran is death by hanging in public squares or prisons.

=== Israel ===
In Israel, the definition of the criminal offence of rape is as follows:

Rape 345.(a)

If a person had intercourse with a woman

- (1) without her freely given consent;
- (2) with the woman's consent, which was obtained by deceit in respect of the identity of the person or the nature of the act;
- (3) when the woman is a minor below age 14, even with her consent;
- (4) by exploiting the woman's state of unconsciousness or other condition that prevents her from giving her free consent;
- (5) by exploiting the fact that she is mentally ill or deficient, if –because of her illness or mental deficiency–her consent to intercourse did not constitute free consent;

then he committed rape and is liable to sixteen years imprisonment.

=== New Zealand ===
Rape is part of the statutory offence of sexual violation. Sexual violation is created by section 128 of the Crimes Act 1961.

Sexual violation is defined as follows:

- (1) Sexual violation is the act of a person who—
  - (a) rapes another person; or
  - (b) has unlawful sexual connection with another person.
- (2) Person A rapes person B if person A has sexual connection with person B, effected by the penetration of person B's genitalia by person A's penis,—
  - (a) without person B's consent to the connection; and
  - (b) without believing on reasonable grounds that person B consents to the connection.
- (3) Person A has unlawful sexual connection with person B if person A has sexual connection with person B—
  - (a) without person B's consent to the connection; and `(b) without believing on reasonable grounds that person B consents to the connection.
- (4) One person may be convicted of the sexual violation of another person at a time when they were married to each other.

==== Consent ====
A person allowing sexual connection to be performed on them does not automatically mean that they are legally consenting. If that person allows sexual connection due to coercion (e.g., under force, threats or fear of force; when he/she is asleep or affected by alcohol or a drug; if he/she is affected by an intellectual, mental, or physical condition or impairment of a certain nature and degree; when he/she is mistaken about the partner's identity), then he/she is not legally consenting.

128A Allowing sexual activity does not amount to consent in some circumstances

- (1) A person does not consent to sexual activity just because he or she does not protest or offer physical resistance to the activity.
- (2) A person does not consent to sexual activity if he or she allows the activity because of—
  - (a) force applied to him or her or some other person; or
  - (b) the threat (express or implied) of the application of force to him or her or some other person; or
  - (c) the fear of the application of force to him or her or some other person.
- (3) A person does not consent to sexual activity if the activity occurs while he or she is asleep or unconscious.
- (4) A person does not consent to sexual activity if the activity occurs while he or she is so affected by alcohol or some other drug that he or she cannot consent or refuse to consent to the activity.
- (5) A person does not consent to sexual activity if the activity occurs while he or she is affected by an intellectual, mental, or physical condition or impairment of such a nature and degree that he or she cannot consent or refuse to consent to the activity.
- (6) One person does not consent to sexual activity with another person if he or she allows the sexual activity because he or she is mistaken about who the other person is.
- (7) A person does not consent to an act of sexual activity if he or she allows the act because he or she is mistaken about its nature and quality.
- (8) This section does not limit the circumstances in which a person does not consent to sexual activity.
- (9) For the purposes of this section,— allows includes acquiesces in, submits to, participates in, and undertakes sexual activity, in relation to a person, means—
  - (a) sexual connection with the person; or
  - (b) the doing on the person of an indecent act that, without the person's consent, would be an indecent assault of the person.

Attempted sexual violation and assault with intent to commit sexual violation are also punished (Article 129).

Article 129A is entitled Sexual conduct with consent induced by certain threats and makes it illegal for a person to have sexual connection with another person or to do an indecent act on another person when the accused knows that the other person has been induced to consent to the connection/act by threat. However, a person is guilty of this crime "if (and only if) he or she knows that the other person has been induced to consent" to the sexual connection/indecent act "by an express or implied threat." Subsection (5), (a), (b), (c) of this article defines "threat" for the purpose of this article.

Article 135 outlaws Indecent assault. Article 138 outlaws Sexual exploitation of a person with a significant impairment.

=== Norway ===
In Norway, rape is defined under the Norwegian Penal Code § 192 as either:

1. engaging in sexual activity by means of violence or threatening behaviour,
2. engaging in sexual activity with somebody who is unconscious or for any other reason incapable of resisting the act, or
3. by means of violence or threatening behaviour compelling any person to engage in sexual activity with another person, or to carry out similar actions with him or herself.

When any of these circumstances occur, a person guilty of rape is punishable by up to 10 years imprisonment. However, if a person is guilty of rape through gross negligence they are liable to imprisonment for a period not exceeding five years.

If the activity in question was sexual intercourse or the offender has rendered a person unconscious or unable to resist the sexual activity, the penalty imposed shall be no less than three years imprisonment.

Further, the same section defines aggravated rape as a rape committed

1. by multiple persons in cooperation (gang rape)
2. in a particularly painful or offensive manner
3. by a person previously convicted of rape under § 192 or of sexual activity with a child under the age of 14 (as per § 195 of the penal code)
4. in such a way that the victim either dies or receives grievous bodily harm.

The section recognizes sexually transmitted infections (defined in the Infection Protection Act) as grievous bodily harm.

=== Philippines ===
Article 266-A of the Revised Penal Code (Title Eight of Act No. 3815) provides that:

Article 266-A. Rape: When And How Committed. – Rape is committed:

- 1) By a man who shall have carnal knowledge of a woman under any of the following circumstances:
  - a) Through force, threat, or intimidation;
  - b) When the offended party is deprived of reason or otherwise unconscious;
  - c) By means of fraudulent machination or grave abuse of authority; and
  - d) When the offended party is under twelve (12) years of age or is demented, even though none of the circumstances mentioned above be present.
- 2) By any person who, under any of the circumstances mentioned in paragraph 1 hereof, shall commit an act of sexual assault by inserting his penis into another person's mouth or anal orifice, or any instrument or object, into the genital or anal orifice of another person.

Chapter 3 of this Code, which relates to rape, was inserted by the Anti-Rape Law of 1997. By section 2 of that Act, the crime of rape is classified as a crime against persons under that Code.

On March 3, 2022, Republic Act (RA) No. 11648 was signed and it changed the definition of rape into "By a person who shall have carnal knowledge of another person", effectively making male rape a crime.

=== Russia ===
According to Article 131 of the Criminal Code of Russia, rape is defined as heterosexual vaginal intercourse using violence or threat of violence or if the victim is in a helpless state. The other forms of a violent sexual intercourse (male–male, female–male, female–female and non-vaginal male–female) are called "coercive sexual actions" and are punishable by Article 132. These two crimes, however, are punishable identically. Besides, such crimes as sexual relations with a person under the age of consent (16 years as of 2013, article 134) and depraved actions (Article 135), if committed against a person under 12 years since 2012 are considered rape or coercive sexual actions (depending on sex of the offender and the victim and the type of intercourse) and punished according to articles 131 or 132, because such victim is deemed to be in a helpless state due to his/her age. However, Article 134 punishes sexual activity between same-sex pairings more harshly than sexual activity between opposite-sex pairings when one of the persons is under 16 years old.

Rape or coercive sexual actions without any aggravating circumstances are punishable with 3 to 6 years of imprisonment. If the crime:

- was committed repeatedly (against one or more than one victim)
- was committed by a group of criminals
- was committed with a threat of murder or grievous harm to health
- was committed with particular cruelty (e.g. the criminal used violence that caused severe physical pain or the crime was committed in presence of relatives of the victim)
- caused an STD infection

then it is punishable with 4 to 10 years of imprisonment with possible subsequent restraint of liberty for up to 2 years (i.e. the criminal may not change or leave residence without permission and must register himself at local penal inspectorate 1 to 4 times a month; court may also impose additional restrictions such as the criminal may not leave home in certain hours, visit certain locations, change work without permission).

If the crime

- was committed against a person between 14 and 18 years
- caused grievous harm to health, HIV infection or other grievous consequences (e.g. suicide of the victim)

then it is punishable with 8 to 15 years of imprisonment with the subsequent mandatory restraint of liberty for up to 2 years and a possible ban on certain occupations or employment positions for up to 20 years.

If the crime

- caused the death of the victim by inadvertency
- was committed against a person under 14 years

then it is punishable with 12 to 20 years of imprisonment with the subsequent mandatory restraint of liberty for up to 2 years and a possible ban on certain occupations or employment positions for up to 20 years.

If the crime was committed against a person under 14 years by the criminal who had previously been sentenced for a sexual crime against a minor then it is punishable with 15 to 20 years of imprisonment with mandatory ban on certain occupations or employment positions for up to 20 years or with life imprisonment.

=== Slovakia ===
Law no. 300/2005 - Criminal law

Paragraph 199

Rape

- (1) Whoever forces a woman to have intercourse by force or the threat of immediate violence or who exploits her defenselessness for such an act shall be punished by imprisonment for five to ten years.
- (2) The offender shall be punished by imprisonment for seven to fifteen years if he commits the act referred to in section 1
  - a) a more serious way of acting,
  - b) on a protected person,
  - c) for a special motive,
  - d) on a woman in detention or serving a prison sentence, or
  - e) joint action of at least two persons.
- (3) The offender shall be punished by imprisonment for fifteen to twenty years if he commits the act referred to in section 1 and
  - a) causes serious injury to health, or
  - b) immediately endangers the life of the child.
- (4) The offender shall be punished by imprisonment for twenty to twenty-five years if he commits the act referred to in section 1
  - a) and causes death by it, or
  - b) in a crisis situation.

=== South Africa ===
In South Africa, rape is defined by the Criminal Law (Sexual Offences and Related Matters) Amendment Act, 2007 (Act No. 32 of 2007). This act abolished the common law offence of rape and replaced it with a new expanded statutory offence of rape, applicable to all forms of sexual penetration without consent, irrespective of gender. Rape is defined in section 3 of the act as follows:

Any person ("A") who unlawfully and intentionally commits an act of sexual penetration with a complainant ("B"), without the consent of B, is guilty of the offence of rape.

and "sexual penetration" is defined as:

any act which causes penetration to any extent whatsoever by—

- (a) the genital organs of one person into or beyond the genital organs, anus, or mouth of another person;
- (b) any other part of the body of one person or, any object, including any part of the body of an animal, into or beyond the genital organs or anus of another person; or
- (c) the genital organs of an animal, into or beyond the mouth of another person[.]

The law also clarifies that marital rape is illegal; section 56 of the Act provides that:

Whenever an accused person is charged with an offence under section 3, 4, 5, 6 or 7 it is not a valid defence for that accused person to contend that a marital or other relationship exists or existed between him or her and the complainant.

=== Switzerland ===
Rape is defined as follows:

Art. 190

Any person who forces a person of the female sex by threats or violence, psychological pressure or by being made incapable of resistance to submit to sexual intercourse is liable to a custodial sentence of from one to ten years.

Marital rape was made illegal in 1992, and since 2004 marital rape is prosecutable ex officio (meaning it can be prosecuted even if the wife does not complain).

Rape of a male is considered a heavy sexual assault/thread and is prosecuted under Art. 189 of the Swiss Penalty Code.

=== Trinidad and Tobago ===
Rape under the law of Trinidad and Tobago is an indictable offence, created by section 4 of the Sexual Offenses Act:

Section 4. Rape

- (1) Subject to subsection (2), a person ("the accused") commits the offence of rape when he has sexual intercourse with another person ("the complainant")—
  - (a) without the consent of the complainant where he knows that the complainant does not consent to the intercourse or he is reckless as to whether the complainant consents; or
  - (b) with the consent of the complainant where the consent—
    - (i) is extorted by threat or fear of bodily harm to the complainant or to another;
    - (ii) is obtained by personating someone else;
    - (iii) is obtained by false or fraudulent representations as to the nature of the intercourse; or
    - (iv) is obtained by unlawfully detaining the complainant

Marital rape is also illegal; subsection (5) states: "(5) This section also applies to a husband in relation to the commission of the offence of rape on his wife."

=== United Kingdom ===
==== England and Wales ====
Rape was formerly a common law offence, with a statutory penalty first given by the Offences against the Person Act 1861, and given a statutory definition by the Sexual Offences (Amendment) Act 1976. This has itself been superseded by the Sexual Offences Act 2003. Rape is currently defined, in section 1 of that act, as follows:

1. Rape
  - (1) A person (A) commits an offence if—
    - (a) he intentionally penetrates the vagina, anus or mouth of another person (B) with his penis,
    - (b) B does not consent to the penetration, and
    - (c) A does not reasonably believe that B consents.

It follows that it is not possible for a person who does not have a penis to commit rape (Note: Other than by joint enterprise; see e.g. Blosse, Benjamin; Beck, Laycie (22 December 2025). "Man and woman jailed after 'horrific' rape in village". Manchester Evening News.). (By general rules of statutory interpretation "words importing the masculine gender include the feminine," so the use of the male pronoun does not preclude a person who is legally recognized as female being convicted of rape.) Section 2 of that act defines assault by penetration:

2. Assault by penetration
  - (1) A person (A) commits an offence if—
    - (a) he intentionally penetrates the vagina or anus of another person (B) with a part of his body or anything else,
    - (b) the penetration is sexual,
    - (c) B does not consent to the penetration, and
    - (d) A does not reasonably believe that B consents.

Both are indictable offences carrying a maximum sentence of life imprisonment.

Rape by a woman (where it does not involve penetration of the victim) falls under the more general section 4, Causing a person to engage in sexual activity without consent, and/or section 3, Sexual assault (sexual touching without consent), both either way offences with a maximum sentence of 10 years' imprisonment.

Other sections create parallel offences where the victim is under 16 years of age; in these cases, consent is irrelevant.

==== Northern Ireland ====
The law on sexual offences closely follows that of England. Rape is a statutory offence created by article 5 of the Sexual Offences (Northern Ireland) Order 2008 (S.I. 1769/2008 (N.I. 2)), which contains the same definition as in England. Likewise assault by penetration, sexual assault, causing a person to engage in sexual activity without consent, and child sex offences are copied from the Sexual Offences Act 2003.

Pursuant to article 5(5), any reference to rape in a statutory provision must be construed in accordance with article 5(1).

No person is liable in tort under the law of Northern Ireland on the ground only of having deprived another of the services of his female servant by raping her.

==== Scotland ====
Rape is a statutory offence. It is created by section 1 of the Sexual Offences (Scotland) Act 2009. It is defined as follows:

Rape

- (1) If a person ("A"), with A's penis—
  - (a) without another person ("B") consenting, and
  - (b) without any reasonable belief that B consents,
  penetrates to any extent, either intending to do so or reckless as to whether there is penetration, the vagina, anus or mouth of B then A commits an offence, to be known as the offence of rape.

Subsection (2) defines that "penetration" involves a penis.

Similarly to the English law, this act also creates various child sex offences in which consent is irrelevant if the victim is under 16. "Rape of a young child" under section 18 applies only if the child is under 13; otherwise it is "having intercourse with an older child."

===== History =====
Prior to the Sexual Offences (Scotland) Act 2009, rape in Scots law differed from the definition of rape in other legal systems. In Scotland, rape was defined as "a crime at common law which consisted of the carnal knowledge of a female by a male person without her consent." Under Scots law, rape could only be carried out by a male who penetrated a female's vagina. If a man's anus was penetrated by another man's penis, this was called sodomy and was tried under indecent assault, a form of aggravated assault. Likewise, if a male penetrated a female's anus by his penis without her consent, he would also be charged with indecent assault.

In Scotland, rape can only be prosecuted in the High Court of Justiciary and if convicted, the maximum penalty available to the court is life imprisonment. Evidence of distress can be used as corroborating evidence. Evidence of distress would be recognised by the first person or friend that the victim sees after the event. This should not be confused with hearsay evidence, which is not normally allowed to be led.

One of the key elements to prosecute a male for rape is to prove that the male had sexual intercourse without the female's consent. For sexual intercourse not to be rape, the active consent of the female is needed. This means it is not enough for a woman to be "passive;" she must actively consent. This was established by Lord Advocate's Reference (No. 1 of 2001). Therefore, a male could still be convicted of rape, even though the female did not say anything or show any resistance. This is a change in the law, as previously men who had sexual intercourse with sleeping women (as in the case of Charles Sweenie) or women who were unconscious due to voluntarily taking drugs or alcohol (see HMA v Logan) were charged with the lesser crime of indecent assault, rather than rape, as they had not used force to achieve penetration. Lord Advocate's Reference (No 1 of 2001), by requiring "active consent," had opened up the law to decide whether a voluntarily drunk or intoxicated woman can consent to sexual intercourse. This was clarified under the new laws of 2009 which state that sexual intercourse is non-consensual, and therefore considered rape if it occurs

... where the conduct occurs at a time when B is incapable because of the effect of alcohol or any other substance of consenting to it.

Penetration is sufficient for a sexual intercourse to be deemed rape: there need not be any excretion of semen and the female's hymen does not have to be ruptured.

In Scotland, rape continued to be a gender-specific crime until the Sexual Offences (Scotland) Act 2009. This Act came into force on 1 December 2010. The Act expanded the definition of rape to include male rape.

The victims' commissioner for England and Wales, Dame Vera Baird, warned in 2020 that only 14 per cent of sexual violence victims report the assault to police. And even if sexual assault and rape are reported, prosecutions and convictions remain depressingly low. In Britain, only 1.6 per cent of rapes reported to the police result in a charge – a rate so low that Baird, has said that "we are witnessing the decriminalisation of rape."

=== United States ===
==== State laws ====
There is no federal rape law in the United States, due to the United States v. Morrison ruling that parts of the Violence Against Women Act of 1994 were unconstitutional. Each state has its own laws concerning sexual aggression, some laws from the founding of the US and during the 1950s were based in racial discrimination against black people, in labelling consensual sex between a black man and white woman rape, and the fact that rape laws at the time did not apply when the victim was a black woman. There is also no national standard in the US for defining and reporting male–male or female-perpetrated rapes. State laws vary considerably, and in most states, the term "rape" is no longer used, and the offense has been replaced by crimes such as "sexual assault," "criminal sexual conduct," "sexual abuse," "sexual battery" etc. The US laws on sexual violence are complex, with states having numerous sex offenses, dealing with different situations. The laws on sex crimes have been changed and modernized significantly during the last decades and they continue to change.

==== Uniform Code of Military Justice ====
Uniform Code of Military Justice [USC Title 10, Subtitle A, Chapter 47X, Section 920, Article 120] defines rape as:

- (a) Rape.— Any person subject to this chapter who commits a sexual act upon another person by:
  - (1) using unlawful force against that other person;
  - (2) using force causing or likely to cause death or grievous bodily harm to any person;
  - (3) threatening or placing that other person in fear that any person will be subjected to death, grievous bodily harm, or kidnapping;
  - (4) first rendering that other person unconscious; or
  - (5) administering to that other person by force or threat of force, or without the knowledge or consent of that person, a drug, intoxicant, or other similar substance and thereby substantially impairing the ability of that other person to appraise or control conduct;
  is guilty of rape and shall be punished as a court-martial may direct.

Marital rape is banned; the law states: "Marriage is not a defense for any conduct in issue in any prosecution under this section."

==== Rape reporting ====
According to the USA Today reporter Kevin Johnson, "no other major category of crime – not murder, assault or robbery – has generated a more serious challenge to the credibility of national crime statistics" as has the crime of rape. He says:

There are good reasons to be cautious in drawing conclusions from reports on rape. The two most accepted studies available – the FBI's annual Uniform Crime Report and the Justice Department's annual National Crime Victimization Survey – each have widely acknowledged weaknesses.

— Kevin Johnson, Rape statistics not crystal clear, https://archive.today/20070928002007/http://www.junkscience.com/nov98/rape2.html

The FBI's report fails to report rapes with male victims, both adults and children, fails to report non-forcible rapes of either gender by either gender, and reflects only the number of rapes reported to police. The Justice Department's survey solicits information from people 12 and older, excluding the youngest victims of rape (and incest). However, by using a random national telephone survey of households, the National Crime Victimization Survey could pick up rapes unreported to the police. In addition, since both official reports collect rape data from states with widely divergent standards and definitions on what constitutes rape, uniform reporting is impossible.

In an attempt to improve the tracking of rape, the National Violence Against Women survey was first published in 1998 by the National Institute of Justice and the federal Centers for Disease Control and Prevention. Its authors acknowledged that they used different methodologies with relatively high margins of error. The 2000 report notes that "because annual rape victimization estimates (nationwide) are based on responses from only 24 women and 8 men (emphasis added) who reported being raped, they should be viewed with caution." It goes on to note that it fails to report rapes perpetrated against children, adolescents, the homeless, or people living in institutions, group facilities, or in households without telephones.

The 2006 report of the National Violence Against Women survey was based on the much larger sample size of 8,000 men and 8,000 women. It estimated that "17.7 million women and 2.8 million men in the United States were forcibly raped at some time in their lives, with 302,091 women and 92,748 men forcibly raped in the year preceding the survey." The report defines "rape" to include completed and attempted rapes. However, the vast majority of rapes were completed: "Among all respondents, 14.8 percent of the women and 2.1 percent of the men said they were victims of a completed rape at some time in their life, whereas 2.8 percent of the women and 0.9 percent of the men said they were victims of an attempted rape only."

In addition, many states define sexual crimes other than male-on-female penetration as sexual assault rather than rape. There are no national standards for defining and reporting male-on-male, female-on-female or female-on-male offenses, so such crimes are generally not included in rape statistics unless these statistics are compiled using information from states which count them as rape.

==== Rape statistics ====
Rape crisis statistics can be found from the FBI and the Bureau of Justice as well as the CDC and RAINN (which uses the other resources as its source).
