= Criminal Justice Act 1993 =

Act of the Parliament of the United Kingdom

Criminal Justice Act 1993 (Note: Section 79(1).)
- Act of Parliament
- Parliament of the United Kingdom
- Long title: An Act to make provision about the jurisdiction of courts in England and Wales in relation to certain offences of dishonesty and blackmail; to amend the law about drug trafficking offences and to implement provisions of the Community Council Directive No. 91/308/EEC; to amend Part VI of the Criminal Justice Act 1988; to make provision with respect to the financing of terrorism, the proceeds of terrorist-related activities and the investigation of terrorist activities; to amend Part I of the Criminal Justice Act 1991; to implement provisions of the Community Council Directive No. 89/592/EEC and to amend and restate the law about insider dealing in securities; to provide for certain offences created by the Banking Coordination (Second Council Directive) Regulations 1992 to be punishable in the same way as offences under sections 39, 40 and 41 of the Banking Act 1987 and to enable regulations implementing Article 15 of the Community Council Directive No. 89/646/EEC and Articles 3, 6 and 7 of the Community Council Directive No. 92/30/EEC to create offences punishable in that way; to make provision with respect to the penalty for causing death by dangerous driving or causing death by careless driving while under the influence of drink or drugs; to make it an offence to assist in or induce certain conduct which for the purposes of, or in connection with, the provisions of Community law is unlawful in another member State; to provide for the introduction of safeguards in connection with the return of persons under backing of warrants arrangements; to amend the Criminal Procedure (Scotland) Act 1975 and Part I of the Prisoners and Criminal Proceedings (Scotland) Act 1993; and for connected purposes.
- Citation: 1993 c. 36
- Territorial extent: United Kingdom (Note: Section 79(2)–(12).)

Dates
- Royal assent: 27 July 1993
- Commencement: various (Note: Section 78.)

Other legislation
- Amends: Backing of Warrants (Republic of Ireland) Act 1965; Criminal Appeal Act 1968; Children and Young Persons Act 1969; Powers of Criminal Courts Act 1973; Criminal Procedure (Scotland) Act 1975; Criminal Law Act 1977; Magistrates' Courts Act 1980; Criminal Appeal (Northern Ireland) Act 1980; Criminal Attempts Act 1981; Contempt of Court Act 1981; Civil Jurisdiction and Judgments Act 1982; Criminal Justice Act 1982; Police and Criminal Evidence Act 1984; Companies Act 1985; Drug Trafficking Offences Act 1986; Financial Services Act 1986; Companies (Northern Ireland) Order 1986; Banking Act 1987; Criminal Justice Act 1987; Criminal Justice (Scotland) Act 1987; Criminal Justice Act 1988; Road Traffic Offenders Act 1988; Prevention of Terrorism (Temporary Provisions) Act 1989; Companies Act 1989; Companies (Northern Ireland) Order 1989; Insolvency (Northern Ireland) Order 1989; Criminal Justice (International Co-operation) Act 1990; Companies (No.2) (Northern Ireland) Order 1990; Northern Ireland (Emergency Provisions) Act 1991; Criminal Justice Act 1991; Banking Coordination (Second Council Directive) Regulations 1992; Prisoners and Criminal Proceedings (Scotland) Act 1993
- Repeals/revokes: Company Securities (Insider Dealing) Act 1985; Company Securities (Insider Dealing) (Northern Ireland) Order 1986
- Amended by: Banking Coordination (Second Council Directive) Regulations 1992; Criminal Justice and Public Order Act 1994; Drug Trafficking Act 1994; Criminal Procedure (Consequential Provisions) (Scotland) Act 1995; Northern Ireland (Emergency Provisions) Act 1996; Theft (Amendment) Act 1996; Criminal Justice (Terrorism and Conspiracy) Act 1998; Northern Ireland Act 1998; Powers of Criminal Courts (Sentencing) Act 2000; Terrorism Act 2000; Financial Services and Markets Act 2000 (Consequential Amendments and Repeals) Order 2001; Proceeds of Crime Act 2002; Extradition Act 2003; Identity Cards Act 2006; Fraud Act 2006; Serious Crime Act 2007; Companies Act 2006 (Consequential Amendments, Transitional Provisions and Savings) Order 2009; Identity Documents Act 2010; Treaty of Lisbon (Changes in Terminology) Order 2011; Capital Requirements Regulations 2013; Financial Services and Markets Act 2000 (Market Abuse) Regulations 2016; Market Abuse (Amendment) (EU Exit) Regulations 2019; Financial Services (Miscellaneous) (Amendment) (EU Exit) (No. 3) Regulations 2019; Financial Services Act 2021; Retained EU Law (Revocation and Reform) Act 2023 (Consequential Amendment) Regulations 2023; Insider Dealing (Securities and Regulated Markets) Order 2023

Status: Amended

Text of statute as originally enacted

Revised text of statute as amended

Text of the Criminal Justice Act 1993 as in force today (including any amendments) within the United Kingdom, from legislation.gov.uk.

The Criminal Justice Act 1993 (c. 36) is an act of the Parliament of the United Kingdom that set out new rules regarding drug trafficking, proceeds and profit of crime, financing of terrorism and insider dealing.

== Overview ==
Section 52 creates an offence of insider dealing, or using private information to trade in shares or securities when the same information is not yet available to the public. It outlines offenses related to drug trafficking, including penalties for those who profit from illegal drug activities as well as established measures for the confiscation of assets derived from drug-related crimes.

== Case law ==
- Patel v Mirza [2016] UKSC 42, on the illegality principle, and right to recover money paid even though it was to be used for insider dealing, contrary to section 52

== See also ==
- Criminal Justice Act - other acts with similar titles
- English criminal law
- UK company law
