= Sexual Offences (Scotland) Act 2009 =

Act of the Scottish Parliament

Sexual Offences (Scotland) Act 2009 (Note: Section 62(1).)
- Act of the Scottish Parliament
- Scottish Parliament
- Long title: An Act of the Scottish Parliament to make new provision about sexual offences, and for connected purposes.
- Citation: 2009 asp 9
- Territorial extent: Scotland

Dates
- Royal assent: 14 July 2009
- Commencement: various (Note: Section 62(2).)

Other legislation
- Amends: Criminal Procedure (Scotland) Act 1995; Criminal Justice (Terrorism and Conspiracy) Act 1998; Sexual Offences (Amendment) Act 2000
- Amended by: Domestic Abuse Act 2021
- Relates to: Sexual Offences Act 2003

Status: Amended

Text of statute as originally enacted

Revised text of statute as amended

Text of the Sexual Offences (Scotland) Act 2009 as in force today (including any amendments) within the United Kingdom, from legislation.gov.uk.

The Sexual Offences (Scotland) Act 2009 (asp 9) is an act of the Scottish Parliament. It creates a code of sexual offences that is said to be intended to reform that area of the law. The corresponding legislation in England and Wales is the Sexual Offences Act 2003 and in Northern Ireland the Sexual Offences (Northern Ireland) Order 2008.

== Background ==
In 2004, the Scottish Law Commission began working on a reference from the Scottish Executive to "examine the law relating to rape and other sexual offences, and the evidential requirements for proving such offences, and to make recommendations for reform" and completed its report in December 2007. The Scottish Government gave a commitment to bring forward legislation in the light of the commission's review. Before the enactment of this act, Scotland had very few statutory sexual offences, with most of its sexual legislation being defined at common law, which was increasingly seen as a problem.

On 17 June 2008, the Scottish Government introduced the Sexual Offences (Scotland) Bill to the Scottish Parliament. The bill was passed by the Parliament on 10 June 2009. The act came into force on 1 December 2010 (except for sections 52 and 53(2)).

The act provides for a definition of consent; it states that "“consent” means free agreement (and related expressions are to be construed accordingly)". Under the act, a number of circumstances where the victim is unable to give consent (such as incapacitation due to alcohol consumption) are illegal. A spokesperson for the Scottish Government has said that the act provides "a clear legal framework that reflects the values of modern society."

== The offence of rape ==
This section creates the offence of rape. This is the first statutory definition of rape in Scots law; prior to this act, the offence was defined at common law. Male rape (male on male assault) is also included in the offence of rape; before this new definition, rape was defined as non-consensual vaginal intercourse imposed by a male against a female.

Rape is defined as follows:

Rape

(1) If a person ("A"), with A's penis—
(a) without another person ("B") consenting, and
(b) without any reasonable belief that B consents,

penetrates to any extent, either intending to do so or reckless as to whether there is penetration, the vagina, anus or mouth of B then A commits an offence, to be known as the offence of rape.

== Other offences under the act ==
The act creates several other offences in the law of Scotland.

- Sexual assault – This offence may include any non-consensual: penetration that would not meet the definition of rape, sexual touching, any form of sexual activity (whether or not through clothing), ejaculation of semen or emission of urine/saliva onto a person for sexual purposes.
- Sexual coercion
- Coercing a person to be present during a sexual activity
- Coercing a person into looking at a sexual image
- Communicating indecently – For instance, sending a sexually explicit text message against the receiver's wishes.
- Sexual exposure – This offence involves the exposure of his or her genitals purely for sexual purposes. It differs from indecent exposure, which can only be committed in a public place.
- Voyeurism – Where a person operates equipment to record or observe someone's genitals, buttocks or underwear; or while they undertake a private action such as changing clothes, using a toilet, washing, or engaging in a sex act themselves.
- Administering a substance for sexual purposes

== Meaning of 'consent' ==
Consent is defined in the act as 'free agreement'. In determining whether an accused had 'reasonable belief' that consent existed, "regard is to be had to whether the person took any steps to ascertain whether there was consent or, as the case may be, knowledge; and if so, to what those steps were". The following examples are given in sections 13 to 15 of the act where consent would not be established. The person carrying out the offence would be 'Person A' and the victim, 'Person B'.

- Where Person B “was incapable due to the effects of alcohol or any other substance of consenting to it” What exact level should be reached before Person B would be incapable of consent is to be decided by the court but once it is reached there is no consent.
- Where Person B was asleep or unconscious.
- Where Person B only consented due to being threatened with violence by Person A.
- Where B consents whilst unlawfully detained by A.
- Where B only consents because they are mistaken as to the nature of the conduct, due to A's misrepresentation.
- Where B only consents as a result of A impersonating a personality known to B.
- Where someone other than B consents on their behalf.
- Where B initially consents, but then withdraws their consent during the sexual act.
- Where B is mentally disordered and so incapable of understanding the nature of the activity.

== Offences relating to children ==
Sections 18-47 of the act are on the subject of sexual offences relating to children, and to people under a duty of care such as mentally disordered persons. The age of consent in Scots law is 16, with the law defining offences against "young children" (under 13), including "Rape of a young child" (section 18, the equivalent of statutory rape) as well as offences against "older children" (aged at least 13 but less than 16) including "Having intercourse with an older child" (section 28).

== See also ==
- Sexual Offences Act
- Sexual offences in the United Kingdom
- Protection of Children and Prevention of Sexual Offences (Scotland) Act 2005
