= Criminal Justice (Scotland) Act 1980 =

Act of the Parliament of the United Kingdom

Criminal Justice (Scotland) Act 1980 (Note: Section 84(1).)
- Act of Parliament
- Parliament of the United Kingdom
- Long title: An Act to make further provision as regards criminal justice in Scotland; and for connected purposes.
- Citation: 1980 c. 62
- Territorial extent: England and Wales (in part); Scotland; Northern Ireland (in part); (Note: Section 84(4)–(7).)

Dates
- Royal assent: 13 November 1980
- Commencement: various (Note: Section 84(2)–(3).)

Other legislation
- Amends: Treason Act 1708; Railways Clauses Consolidation (Scotland) Act 1845; Immigration Act 1971
- Repeals/revokes: Treason Act 1800
- Amended by: Road Traffic Regulation Act 1984; Mental Health (Scotland) Act 1984; Sporting Events (Control of Alcohol etc.) Act 1985; Law Reform (Miscellaneous Provisions) (Scotland) Act 1985; Statute Law (Repeals) Act 1986; Legal Aid (Scotland) Act 1986; Public Order Act 1986; Road Traffic (Consequential Provisions) Act 1988; Prevention of Terrorism (Temporary Provisions) Act 1989; Prisons (Scotland) Act 1989; Criminal Procedure (Consequential Provisions) (Scotland) Act 1995; Animal Health and Welfare (Scotland) Act 2006 (Consequential Provisions) Order 2006

Status: Amended

Text of statute as originally enacted

Revised text of statute as amended

Text of the Criminal Justice (Scotland) Act 1980 as in force today (including any amendments) within the United Kingdom, from legislation.gov.uk.

The Criminal Justice (Scotland) Act 1980 (c. 62) is an act of the Parliament of the United Kingdom. Most of the act's provisions were merely a consolidation of already existing legislation, and as such subject to little controversy, with the notable exception was section 80, which partially decriminalised private homosexual acts between consenting adults in Scotland.

Subject to the provisions of this section, a homosexual act in private shall not be an offence provided that the parties consent thereto and have attained the age of twenty-one years. — Criminal Justice (Scotland) Act 1980, section 80(1)

The homosexual age of consent fixed by the act (21) was much higher than the heterosexual age of consent in the United Kingdom, which had been set at 16 since the Criminal Law Amendment Act 1885 (48 & 49 Vict. c. 69). The ages of consent for homosexual and heterosexual acts in Scotland were eventually equalised twenty years later with the passage of the Sexual Offences (Amendment) Act 2000.

== Passage ==
=== Provisions dealing with homosexual acts in Scotland ===
==== Background ====
As a result of policy directions by the Lord Advocate, private and consensual homosexual acts between people over 21 had ceased to be actively prosecuted by the late 1970's.

In 1977, the House of Lords had passed, by a vote of 125 to 27, Lord Boothby's Sexual Offences (Scotland) Bill, which would have formally decriminalised homosexuality in Scotland to the same extent as in England and Wales. The Bill, however, was not considered a priority by the Government and therefore was never put up to a vote in the House of Commons.

==== Criminal Justice (Scotland) Bill ====
The provisions decriminalising homosexuality were introduced through an amendment proposed by Robin Cook MP. While moving it, he stated, "The clause bears the names of hon. Members from all three major parties. I regret that the only party represented among Scottish Members of Parliament from which there has been no support for the clause is the Scottish National Party. I am pleased to see both representatives of that party in their place, and I hope to convert them in the remainder of my remarks." Cook's amendment was eventually passed by a vote of 203 to 80 (a majority of 123); Gordon Wilson and Donald Stewart, the only two MPs belonging to the SNP, were among those voting against.

== Amendments ==
- Most of the provisions of the act were repealed and re-enacted as the Criminal Law (Consolidation) (Scotland) Act 1995.
- The act of 1995 was itself amended by the Sexual Offences (Amendment) Act 2000 (which made the age of consent for gay sex equal to the one for straight sex), and by the Sexual Offences (Scotland) Act 2009, which altered most of its provisions in regards to sexual offences.

== See also ==
- LGBT rights in the United Kingdom
- Sexual Offences Act 1967, the act which decriminalized homosexual acts in England and Wales.
- Homosexual Offences (Northern Ireland) Order 1982, the Order in Council which decriminalized homosexual acts in Northern Ireland.
