= Criminal Law (Consolidation) (Scotland) Act 1995 =

Act of the Parliament of the United Kingdom

Criminal Law (Consolidation) (Scotland) Act 1995 (Note: Section 53(1).)
- Act of Parliament
- Parliament of the United Kingdom
- Long title: An Act to consolidate for Scotland certain enactments creating offences and relating to criminal law there.
- Citation: 1995 c. 39
- Territorial extent: Scotland (whole act); England and Wales (sections 35(10)–(12) and 27–29); Northern Ireland (sections 27–29); (Note: Section 53(3)–(4).)

Dates
- Royal assent: 8 November 1995
- Commencement: 1 April 1996 (Note: Section 53(2).)

Other legislation
- Amended by: Sex Offenders Act 1997; Criminal Justice (Terrorism and Conspiracy) Act 1998; Crime and Disorder Act 1998; Sexual Offences (Amendment) Act 2000; Crime (International Co-operation) Act 2003; Human Fertilisation and Embryology Act 2008; Criminal Justice (Scotland) Act 2016
- Relates to: Forgery of Foreign Bills Act 1803

Status: Amended

Text of statute as originally enacted

Revised text of statute as amended

Text of the Criminal Law (Consolidation) (Scotland) Act 1995 as in force today (including any amendments) within the United Kingdom, from legislation.gov.uk.

The Criminal Law (Consolidation) (Scotland) Act 1995 (c. 39) is an act of the Parliament of the United Kingdom passed to consolidate certain enactments creating offences and relating to the criminal law of Scotland.

== Part I - Sexual Offences ==
=== Incest and related offences ===
- Section 1 consolidates the offence of incest. It applies when a male and a female related in certain ways have sexual intercourse. It applies only to close relatives (father, son, grandfather, grandson, great grandfather, great grandson, brother, uncle, nephew, and female equivalents) and to current or former adoptive fathers, mothers, sons and daughters, and applies to both full blood and half blood relationships. There are defences where the accused proves that he did not know that the relationship existed, where the accused did not consent and where the parties were married outside Scotland. This section consolidates section 2A of the Sexual Offences (Scotland) Act 1976, as inserted by the Incest and Related Offences (Scotland) Act 1986.
- Section 2 deals with sexual intercourse between step-parents and stepchildren. It provides that any stepparent or former stepparent who has sexual intercourse with his or her stepchild or former stepchild shall be guilty of an offence if that stepchild is either under the age of 21 years or has at any time before attaining the age of 18 years lived in the same household and been treated as a child of his or her family. The same defences apply as for section 1, together with a further defence of reasonable belief that the person had attained the age of 21. This section consolidates section 2B of the Sexual Offences (Scotland) Act 1976, as inserted by the Incest and Related Offences (Scotland) Act 1986.
- Section 3 made it an offence for a person over the age of 16 to have sexual intercourse with a child under 16 where that person is a member of the same household as the child and is in a position of trust and authority in relation to that child. There were defences where the accused reasonably believed that the child had attained the age of 16, where the accused did not consent and where the parties were married outside Scotland. This section consolidated section 2C of the Sexual Offences (Scotland) Act 1976, as inserted by the Incest and Related Offences (Scotland) Act 1986. This section was repealed by the Sexual Offences (Scotland) Act 2009 on 1 December 2010.
- Section 4 deals with procedural matters and the penalties for offences under sections 1 to 3. The maximum penalty on indictment for any of the offences is life imprisonment, and 12 months on summary conviction. This section consolidates section 2D of the Sexual Offences (Scotland) Act 1976, as inserted by the Incest and Related Offences (Scotland) Act 1986.

=== Offences against children ===
Sections 5 and 6 were repealed by the Sexual Offences (Scotland) Act 2009 on 1 December 2010.

=== Procuring, prostitution, etc. ===
- Section 7 creates a number of offences relating to procuring young women or girls to have unlawful sexual intercourse or to become prostitutes or to become an inmate of or frequent brothels. It also formerly criminalised the use of threats and intimidation, false pretences or drugs to procure a female (of any age) to have unlawful sexual intercourse. It also formerly criminalised inducing a woman to have sex by pretending to be her husband. The Sexual Offences (Scotland) Act 2009 repealed and replaced the second and third sets of offences under this section.
- Section 8 makes it illegal to detain a female against her will in a brothel, or in other premises for the purposes of unlawful sexual intercourse with men. The withholding of clothing is treated as a form of detention.
- Section 9 makes it an offence for the owner, occupier or manager of premises to induce or knowingly suffer a girl under 16 to use premises for unlawful sexual intercourse. It is a defence to this offence that the accused, being a man under the age of 24 years who had not previously been charged with a like offence, had reasonable cause to believe that the girl was of or over the age of 16 years. The Sexual Offences (Scotland) Act 2009 amended the defence in section 9 so that it applies to any person (with some exceptions), and not just to a man under the age of 24.
- Section 10 makes it an offence for a person with parental responsibilities in relation to a girl under 16 to cause or encourage the seduction or prostitution, unlawful sexual intercourse or the commission of an indecent assault on her.
- Section 11 (Trading in prostitution and brothel keeping) makes it an offence for a male to knowingly live, wholly or partly on the earnings of prostitution. It is also an offence for a female, for the purpose of gain, to exercise control, direction or influence over the movements of a prostitute in such a manner as to show that she is aiding, abetting or compelling her prostitution with any other person, or generally. The maximum penalty on indictment for these offences is 7 years imprisonment, or 12 months on summary conviction.

Section 11 also makes it an offence for a person to keep, manage, or act or assist in the management of a brothel; for a tenant, lessee etc. to knowingly permit premises to be used as a brothel or for habitual prostitution; or for the lessor or landlord (or agent), knowing that premises are used as a brothel, to permit their continued use. The maximum penalty for these offences is 7 years imprisonment, or 12 months on summary conviction.

- Section 12 (Allowing child to be in brothel) makes it an offence for any person having parental responsibilities (as defined in the Children (Scotland) Act 1995) to allow a child between the ages of 4 and 16 to reside in or frequent a brothel. The maximum penalty, on indictment or summary conviction, is a level 2 fine (with provision for 6 months imprisonment on default). Special provision is made allowing a person prosecuted on indictment under section 9 to be found guilty of an offence under this section.
- Section 13 ensures that premises are treated for the purposes of sections 11 and 12 of this Act as a brothel whether they are used for homosexual or heterosexual activities.

=== Homosexual offences ===
- Section 13 (homosexual offences) provided that a homosexual act (defined as sodomy or an act of gross indecency or shameless indecency by one male person with another male person) in private was not an offence, provided that the parties consented and had attained the age of 16. This section was largely repealed by the Sexual Offences (Scotland) Act 2009 on 1 December 2010, leaving only the offences of living off the earnings of male prostitution.
- The former provisions of section 13 provided a limited decriminalisation of same-sex sexual contact. Acts in public lavatories continued to be criminal. It remained an offence to commit or be party to the commission of, or to procure or attempt to procure a homosexual act other than in private, or without the consent of the parties, or with any person under 16 years of age. It was a defence to the latter leg of the offence that the accused was aged under 24 years of age and they had reasonable cause to believe that the other man was aged at least 16 years. Boys aged under 16 years did not commit the offence where the other party was over 16.
- It was also an offence to procure or attempt to procure the commission of a homosexual act between two other male persons. The maximum penalty for these offences on indictment was 2 years' imprisonment and an unlimited fine, and 12 months' imprisonment on summary conviction.
- Section 13 continues to make it an offence for a person to live wholly or in part on the earnings of another from male prostitution or to solicit or importune any male person for the purpose of procuring the commission of a homosexual act. The maximum penalty for these offences on indictment is 2 years' imprisonment, and on summary conviction is 12 months' imprisonment.
- In the parliamentary debates which led to the repeal of much of section 13, the Scottish Government's representative explained that:

[S]ection 13(4) of the 1995 act defines “a homosexual act” as an act of "sodomy or an act of gross indecency or shameless indecency". There are two problems with that. The first is that “shameless indecency” no longer exists as an offence, and the terms “sodomy” and “gross indecency” are, in effect, repealed[…] The second is that the language is very offensive. It is discriminatory to define any homosexual act between men as sodomy, gross indecency or shameless indecency. Section 13(4) of the 1995 act must be amended, by a simple consequential amendment to the bill, to define “a homosexual act” in straightforward terms as a sexual act between men.

Another problem is that section 13(9) of the 1995 act goes beyond prostitution. It criminalises any soliciting or importuning by “any male person for the purpose of procuring the commission of a homosexual act”. We think that that criminalises a man asking another man to have sex with him, because doing so is regarded as soliciting the procuring of a homosexual act by the other man. The words “for the purposes of prostitution” are missing from section 13(9) of the 1995 act. That is the key point. In all other legislation on prostitution, the words “for the purposes of prostitution” are there to qualify the words “soliciting” or “importuning”. We therefore recommend that the phrase be inserted[…] to ensure that the scope of what remains catches only prostitution[…] and does not accidentally catch things that should be legal for gay men, just as they are legal for everybody else.

=== Miscellaneous ===
Sections 14 to 18 contain miscellaneous provisions relating to sexual offences.

- Section 14 (Power, on indictment for rape, etc., to convict of other offences.) provided that when is tried on indictment for [rape] or an offence under section 5(1) (unlawful sexual intercourse with girl under 13) and the jury are not satisfied that the accused is guilty of that offence (or an attempt), the accused may instead be convicted of an offence under -
  - section 5(2) - attempt to have unlawful sexual intercourse with girl under 13
  - section 5(3) - unlawful sexual intercourse (or attempt) with girl of or over 13 and under 16
  - section 7(2) - threats, intimidation, false pretences &c, or administration of drugs to procure unlawful sexual intercourse
  - section 7(3) - impersonation of husband
  - or of the common law offence of indecent assault.

This section was repealed by the Sexual Offences (Scotland) Act 2009 on 1 December 2010.

- Section 15 (defence to charge of indecent assault), which formerly provided that it was a defence to a charge of indecent assault committed against a girl under the age of 16 years that the person so charged has reasonable cause to believe that the girl was his wife, was repealed by the Criminal Justice (Scotland) Act 2003
- Section 16 (power of search) provides a power to obtain a search warrant where there is reasonable cause to suspect that a woman or girl is unlawfully detained for immoral purposes.
- Section 16A (Conspiracy or incitement to commit certain sexual acts outside the United Kingdom) makes it an offence for a person in Scotland to incite the commission of certain sexual offences outside the UK. The section was inserted by the Sexual Offences (Conspiracy and Incitement) Act 1996. The section formerly dealt with conspiracy as well as incitement, but this was removed by the Criminal Justice (Terrorism and Conspiracy) Act 1998, which made general provision for extraterritorial conspiracy offences. This section was repealed by the Sexual Offences (Scotland) Act 2009 on 1 December 2010.
- Section 16B (Commission of certain sexual acts outside the United Kingdom) makes it an offence for a British citizen or resident to commit certain sexual offences outside the UK, provided that the conduct is also an offence in the country where it is committed. This section was inserted by the Sex Offenders Act 1997. This section was repealed by the Sexual Offences (Scotland) Act 2009 on 1 December 2010.
- Section 17 (Liability to other criminal proceedings) preserves the effect of the common law and other enactments dealing with sexual offences, but prevents a person being punished twice for the same conduct.

== Part II - Sporting Events: Control of Alcohol etc. ==
Part II of the act (sections 18 to 23) allow the Scottish Ministers (formerly the Secretary of State for Scotland) to designate sports grounds or sports events, to which certain special controls apply.

Section 19 creates offences of being in possession of alcohol, allowing the possession of alcohol, or being drunk on vehicles going to or from a designated sporting event.

Section 20 creates offences of being in possession of a controlled container, a controlled article or substance or alcohol in a relevant area of a designated sports ground, or of attempting to enter the ground while in possession. Controlled articles/substances include fireworks, distress flares, fog signals and other substances that can be used as a flare. Controlled containers are those that could be used as a missile, e.g. a beer bottle. It is also an offence for a person to be drunk in the relevant area of a designated sports ground, or to attempt to enter the ground while drunk.

Section 21 gives the police powers of entry and search.

These provisions were previously in the Criminal Justice (Scotland) Act 1980.

Current designations are under the Sports Grounds and Sporting Events (Designation)(Scotland) Order 2014. The Sports Grounds and Sporting Events (Designation)(Scotland) Amendment Order 2007 de-designated Senior Men's International Rugby Union Matches played at Murrayfield Stadium and Hampden Park, allowing alcohol to be sold at matches during the 2007 Rugby World Cup.

== Part III - Detention by Customs Officers ==
Part III of the act deals with detention and questioning by customs officers. These sections were formerly sections 48 to 50 of the Criminal Justice (Scotland) Act 1987.

Section 24 gives officers of Her Majesty's Revenue and Customs power to detain a person for up to 6 hours to facilitate the carrying out of investigations into a criminal offence and/or whether criminal proceedings should be instigated for that offence. The power applies only to offences relating to "assigned matters" (defined in section 1 of the Customs and Excise Management Act 1979 which are punishable by imprisonment. Subsections (5) and (8) set out various protections for the rights of the detained person.

Section 25 provides that where a person is detained under section 24, he is entitled to have intimation of his detention and of the place of detention sent to a solicitor and to one other person named by him without delay, and the person is to be informed of this entitlement. Where some delay is necessary in the interest of the investigation or the prevention of crime or the apprehension of offenders, this is to be done with no more delay than is so necessary. Where the detained person is a child (under 16), notification is to be sent to the child's parent, who is entitled to attend.

Section 26 provides further powers in connection with drug smuggling offences, where it is believed that a controlled drug is secreted in a person's body. The section authorises detention for up to 24 hours, the taking of blood and urine samples, intimate searches by a registered medical practitioner. The period of detention can be extended up to 7 days in certain circumstances on application by the procurator fiscal to the sheriff.

== Part IV - Investigation of Serious or Complex Fraud ==
Part IV of the act deals with the investigation of serious or complex fraud. These sections were formerly sections 51 to 54 of the Criminal Justice (Scotland) Act 1987.

Section 27 empowers the Lord Advocate to make a direction where it appears to the Lord Advocate—

(a) that a suspected offence may involve serious or complex fraud; and
(b) that, for the purpose of investigating the affairs or any aspect of the affairs of any person, there is good reason to do so.

Where a direction has been made, the special investigatory powers in section 28 apply.

The Lord Advocate may also give a direction under this section by virtue of section 15(4) of the Crime (International Co-operation) Act 2003 or on a request being made to him by the Attorney-General of the Isle of Man, Jersey or Guernsey acting under corresponding legislation.

Section 28 sets out special powers of investigation which are available when a direction has been made. A person nominated by the Lord Advocate may require the person under investigation, or anyone else who may have relevant information, to answer questions or furnish information or provide documents relevant to the investigation. There is power to obtain a search warrant where documents are not provided or for other special reasons. There are also protections for information subject to legal professional privilege.

== Part V - Drug Trafficking ==
Part V of the act formerly dealt with drug trafficking. It was repealed by the Proceeds of Crime Act 2002

== Part VI - Miscellaneous and General ==
Part VI of the act contains a number of miscellaneous provisions.

- False oaths (sections 44 to 46). Section 44 provides that it is an offence to make a false statement on oath or in a variety of declarations, returns etc. It is also an offence to seek to be entered in any professional register by means of false declarations or certificates. Section 45 provides that aiding, abetting, counselling, procuring or inciting an offence under section 44 is also an offence, and preserves the common law of perjury and fraud. Section 46 provides that the forms and ceremonies used in taking an oath are immaterial for the purpose of the section 44 offence, and provides for extraterritorial jurisdiction. These provisions were formerly in the False Oaths (Scotland) Act 1933.
- False monetary instruments (section 46A). Section 46A was inserted by the Crime (International Co-operation) Act 2003. It provides that it is an offence for a person to counterfeit or falsify a specified monetary instrument with the intention that it be uttered as genuine, and for a person to have in his custody or control, without lawful authority or excuse, a counterfeit or falsified monetary instrument or devices or materials designed or adapted for making such instruments. The penalties for these offences are up to 10 years imprisonment. The section applies to instruments specified in the False Monetary Instruments (Scotland) Order 2005 (SSI 2005/321), i.e. money orders, postal orders, United Kingdom postage stamps, share certificates, cheques and other bills of exchange, travellers' cheques, bankers' drafts, promissory notes, cheque cards, debit cards, and credit cards.
- Offensive weapons (section 47 to 50). Section 47 makes it an offence for a person to have any offensive weapon with him in a public place without lawful authority or reasonable excuse. Section 49 makes it an offence to have a bladed or sharply pointed article in a public place without good reason or lawful authority. There is a defence where the person had the article with him for use at work, for religious reasons or as part of any national costume (e.g. a sgian dubh or kirpan). The maximum penalty for these offences is 4 years imprisonment. Sections 48 and 50 provide for powers of search. These provisions were formerly in the Prevention of Crime Act 1953, the Criminal Justice (Scotland) Act 1980, and the Carrying of Knives etc. (Scotland) Act 1993.
- Racially aggravated harassment (section 50A). Section 50A was inserted by the Crime and Disorder Act 1998. It makes it an offence if a person-

(a) pursues a racially aggravated course of conduct which amounts to harassment of a person and—

(i) is intended to amount to harassment of that person; or
(ii) occurs in circumstances where it would appear to a reasonable person that it would amount to harassment of that person; or

(b) acts in a manner which is racially aggravated and which causes, or is intended to cause, a person alarm or distress.
The maximum penalty on conviction on indictment is seven years imprisonment and/or an unlimited fine.

- Reset (section 51). Section 51 ensures that the offence of resetting of property extends to the receiving of property appropriated by breach of trust and embezzlement and by falsehood, fraud and wilful imposition, as well as the receiving of property taken by theft or robbery. This provision was previously in the Criminal Procedure (Scotland) Act 1975.
- Vandalism (section 52). Section 52 provides that a person who, without reasonable excuse, wilfully or recklessly destroys or damages any property belonging to another shall be guilty of the offence of vandalism. Acts of wilful fireraising are excluded. The offence is triable summarily, with a maximum penalty of 6 months imprisonment. This provision was previously contained in the Criminal Justice (Scotland) Act 1980.

== See also ==
- Criminal Law Act
