= Perjury Act 1911 =

Act of the Parliament of the United Kingdom

Perjury Act 1911 (Note: Section 19.)
- Act of Parliament
- Parliament of the United Kingdom
- Long title: An Act to consolidate and simplify the Law relating to Perjury and kindred offences.
- Citation: 1 & 2 Geo. 5. c. 6
- Territorial extent: England and Wales (Note: Section 18.)

Dates
- Royal assent: 29 June 1911
- Commencement: 1 January 1912 (Note: Section 19.)
Other legislation
Amends	See § Repealed enactments
Repeals/revokes	See § Repealed enactments
Amended by	Criminal Justice Act 1925; Statute Law Revision Act 1927; Administration of Justice (Miscellaneous Provisions) Act 1933; Criminal Justice Act 1948; Criminal Justice Act 1967; Criminal Law Act 1967; Courts Act 1971; Evidence (Proceedings in other Jurisdictions) Act 1975; Administration of Justice Act 1977; Criminal Attempts Act 1981; Prosecution of Offences Act 1985; Marriage (Prohibited Degrees of Relationship) Act 1986

Status: Amended

Text of statute as originally enacted

Revised text of statute as amended

Text of the Perjury Act 1911 as in force today (including any amendments) within the United Kingdom, from legislation.gov.uk.

The Perjury Act 1911 (1 & 2 Geo. 5. c. 6) is an act of the Parliament of the United Kingdom. It creates the offence of perjury and a number of similar offences.

The act has effect as if section 89 of the Criminal Justice Act 1967 and section 80 of the Civil Partnership Act 2004 were contained in this act.

== Provisions ==
=== Section 1 - Perjury ===
Section 1 of the act creates the offence of perjury.

=== Section 1A - False unsworn statement under Evidence (Proceedings in other Jurisdictions) Act 1975 ===
Section 1A of the act was inserted by section 8(1) of, and schedule 1 to, the Evidence (Proceedings in other Jurisdictions) Act 1975. It provides:

If any person, in giving any testimony (either orally or in writing) otherwise than on oath, where required to do so by an order under section 2 of the Evidence (Proceedings in other Jurisdictions) Act 1975, makes a statement -

(a) which he knows to be false in a material particular, or
(b) which is false in a material particular and which he does not believe to be true,

he shall be guilty of an offence and shall be liable on conviction on indictment to imprisonment for a term not exceeding two years or a fine or both.

This offence is triable either way. A person guilty of this offence is liable, on conviction on indictment, to imprisonment for a term not exceeding two years, or to a fine, or to both, or, summary conviction, to imprisonment for a term not exceeding six months, or to a fine not exceeding the prescribed sum, or to both.

=== Section 7 - Aiders, abettors, suborners, etc ===
Section 7(1) of the act is redundant.

=== Section 13 - Corroboration ===
Section 13 of the act provides:

A person shall not be liable to be convicted of any offence against this Act, or of any offence declared by any other Act to be perjury or subornation of perjury, or to be punishable as perjury or subornation of perjury, solely upon the evidence of one witness as to the falsity of any statement alleged to be false.

The following cases are relevant to the interpretation of this section:

- R v Mayhew (1834) 6 C & P 315
- R v Threlfall, 10 Cr App R 112, 23 Cox 230
- R v O'Connor [1980] Crim LR 43, CA
- R v Rider, 83 Cr App R 207, [1986] Crim LR 626, CA
- R v Stokes [1988] Crim LR 110, CA
- R v Peach [1990] 1 WLR 976, [1990] 2 All ER 966, 91 Cr App R 379, [1990] Crim LR 741, CA
- R v Carroll, 99 Cr App R 381, CA

== Section 17 - Repeals ==
Section 17 of the act repealed 140 enactments, listed in the schedule to the act.

Citation	Short title	Description	Extent of repeal
32 Hen. 8. c. 9	Maintenance and Embracery Act 1540	Agenst maintenaunee and embracery byeng of titles, &c.	In section three, the words " or " suborne any witnes by tres, " rewardis, promises, or by " any other sinistre labour or " meanes," and the words " or " to the procurement or occasion of any manner of pjury " by false verdict or otherwise."
5 Eliz. c. 9	Perjury Act 1562	An Act for the Punyshement of suche persones as shall procure or comit any wyllfiu Perjurye.	The whole act.
1 Ann. stat. 2. c. 9	Witnesses on Trial for Treason, etc. Act 1702	An Act for punishing of Accessories to feloneys and Receivers of stolen Goods, and to prevent the wilful burning and destroying of Ships.	Section three from "and if convicted " to the end of the section.
12 Geo. 1. c. 29	Frivolous Arrests Act 1725	The Frivolous Arrests Act, 1725.	In section four, the words " or of " wilful and corrupt perjury or " of subornation of perjury."
2 Geo. 2. c. 25	Perjury Act 1728	The Perjury Act, 1728	The whole act.
24 Geo. 3. sess. 2. c. 25	East India Company Act 1784	The East India Company Act, 1781.	Section seventy-five from " and if any such witness" to the end of the section.
42 Geo. 3. c. 85.	Criminal Jurisdiction Act 1802	The Criminal Jurisdiction Act, 1802.	Section five.
42 Geo. 3. c. 116	Land Tax Redemption Act 1802	The Land Tax Redemption Act, 1802.	Section one hundred and ninety-three.
48 Geo. 3. c. 149	Probate and Legacy Duties Act 1808	The Probate and Legacy Duties Act, 1808.	Section thirty-seven from " and if " any person or persons making " any such affidavit" to the end of the section.
54 Geo. 3. c. 159	Harbours Act 1814	The Harbours Act, 1814.	Section twenty-five.
56 Geo. 3. c. 46	Civil List Audit Act 1816	The Civil List Audit Act, 1816.	Section eleven.
1 & 2 Geo. 4. c. 121	Commissariat Accounts Act 1821	The Commissariat Accounts Act, 1821.	Section twenty-eight.
3 Geo. 4. c. 114	Hard Labour Act 1822	The Hard Labour Act, 1822.	In section one, the words " wilful " and corrupt perjury or of " subornation of perjury."
7 Geo. 4. c. 16	Chelsea and Kilmainham Hospitals Act 1826	The Chelsea and Kilmainham Hospitals Act. 1826.	Section twenty-eight.
7 Geo. 4. c. 46	Country Bankers Act 1826	The Country Bankers Act, 1826.	Section eighteen from " and if any such secretary" to the end of the section.
7 & 8 Geo. 4. c. 53	Excise Management Act 1827	The Excise Management Act, 1827.	Section thirty-one.
10 Geo. 4. c. 24	Government Annuities Act 1829	The Government Annuities Act, 1829.	Section forty-four.
10 Geo. 4. c. 50	Crown Lands Act 1829	The Crown Lands Act, 1829.	Section eighty-three.
1 Will. 4. c. 22	Evidence on Commission Act 1831	The Evidence on Commission Act, 1831.	Section seven from " and if upon such oath or affirmation " to the end of the section.
2 & 3 Will. 4. c. 53	Army Prize Money Act 1832	The Army Prize Money Act, 1832.	Section forty-five.
2 & 3 Will. 4. c. 53	Army Prize Money Act 1832	The Army Prize Money Act, 1832.	In section forty-six, the words " the " offence of taking a false oath " or suborning any person so to " do or."
2 & 3 Will. 4. c. 53	Army Prize Money Act 1832	The Army Prize Money Act, 1832.	Section forty-nine from "or shall knowingly take a false oath . . ." to " other military service."
3 & 4 Will. 4. c. 41	Judicial Committee Act 1833	The Judicial Committee Act, 1833.	Section nine from " and every such witness" to the end of the section.
3 & 4 Will. 4. c. 49	Quakers and Moravians Act 1833	The Quakers and Moravians Act, 1833.	Section one from " and if any such person" to "notwithstanding."
5 & 6 Will. 4. c. 62	Statutory Declarations Act 1835	The Statutory Declarations Act, 1835.	Section five.
5 & 6 Will. 4. c. 62	Statutory Declarations Act 1835	The Statutory Declarations Act, 1835.	Section twelve from " and all and every" to the end of the section.
5 & 6 Will. 4. c. 62	Statutory Declarations Act 1835	The Statutory Declarations Act, 1835.	Section eighteen from " and if any declaration" to the end of the section.
5 & 6 Will. 4. c. 62	Statutory Declarations Act 1835	The Statutory Declarations Act, 1835.	Section twenty-one.
6 & 7 Will. 4. c. 71	Tithe Act 1836	The Tithe Act, 1836	Section ninety-three from the beginning of the section to " penalties of perjury, and ".
6 & 7 Will. 4. c. 86	Births and Deaths Registration Act 1836	The Births and Deaths Registration Act, 1836.	Section forty-one.
1 & 2 Vict. c. 77	Central Criminal Court Act 1837	The Quakers and Moravians Act, 1838.	Section one from " and if any such person" to "are or shall be subject."
1 & 2 Vict. c. 105.	Oaths Act 1838	The Oaths Act, 1838	In section one, the word " either" and the words "or a witness or a deponent" and from " and every such person" to the end of the section.
2 & 3 Vict. c. 71	Metropolitan Police Courts Act 1839	The Metropolitan Police Courts Act, 1839.	Section twenty-three.
3 & 4 Vict. c. 18	Tobacco Act 1840	The Tobacco Act, 1840	Section ten from "and if such declaration " to the end of the section.
3 & 4 Vict. c. 72	Marriage Act 1840	The Marriage Act, 1840	Section four.
3 & 4 Vict. c. 86	Church Discipline Act 1840	The Church Discipline Act, 1840.	Section eighteen from " and every such witness " to the end of the section.
3 & 4 Vict. c. 97	Railway Regulation Act 1840	The Railway Regulation Act, 1840.	Section four.
5 & 6 Vict. c. 29	Pentonville Prison Act 1842	The Pentonville Prison Act, 1842.	Section twenty-seven.
5 & 6 Vict. c. 35	Income Tax Act 1842	The Income Tax Act, 1842.	Section one hundred and eighty.
5 & 6 Vict. c. 38.	Quarter Sessions Act 1842	The Quarter Sessions Act, 1842.	In section one, the following words:— “6Perjury and subornation of " perjury: 7Making or suborning any " other person to make a false " oath, affirmation, or declaration, " punishable as perjury or as a " misdemeanour:”
6 & 7 Vict. c. 18	Parliamentary Voters Registration Act 1843	The Parliamentary Voters Registration Act, 1843.	In section forty-one, the words " and every person taking any " oath or affirmation under this " Act who shall wilfully swear or " affirm falsely shall be guilty of " perjury."
6 & 7 Vict. c. 18	Parliamentary Voters Registration Act 1843	The Parliamentary Voters Registration Act, 1843.	In section eighty-one, the words " and if any person shall wilfully " make a false answer to either of " the questions aforesaid he shall " be deemed guilty of a misdemeanor, and shall and may be " indicted and punished accordingly."
8 & 9 Vict. c. 18	Lands Clauses Consolidation Act 1845	The Lands Clauses Consolidation Act, 1845.	Section one hundred and forty-nine.
8 & 9 Vict. c. 20	Railways Clauses Consolidation Act 1845	The Railways Clauses Consolidation Act, 1845.	Section one hundred and sixty.
8 & 9 Vict. c. 118	Inclosure Act 1845	The Inclosure Act, 1845.	In section one hundred and sixty-four, the words "shall wilfully " give false evidence, or shall " make or subscribe a false declaration for the purposes of " this Act, or".
10 & 11 Vict. c. 14	Markets and Fairs Clauses Act 1847	The Markets and Fairs Clauses Act, 1847.	Section fifty-seven.
10 & 11 Vict. c. 15	Gasworks Clauses Act 1847	The Gas Works Clauses Act, 1847.	Section forty-four.
10 & 11 Vict. c. 16	Commissioners Clauses Act 1847	The Commissioners Clauses Act, 1847.	Sections thirteen and one hundred and eight.
10 & 11 Vict. c. 17	Waterworks Clauses Act 1847	The Waterworks Clauses Act, 1847.	Section eighty-nine.
10 & 11 Vict. c. 27	Harbours, Docks, and Piers Clauses Act 1847	The Harbours, Docks, and Piers Clauses Act, 1847.	Section ninety-six.
10 & 11 Vict. c. 34	Towns Improvement Clauses Act 1847	The Towns Improvement Clauses Act, 1847.	Section two hundred and thirteen.
10 & 11 Vict. c. 65	Cemeteries Clauses Act 1847	The Cemeteries Clauses Act, 1847.	Section sixty-five
10 & 11 Vict. c. 69	House of Commons Costs Taxation Act 1847	The House of Commons Costs Taxation Act, 1847.	Section five from " and any person " to the end of the section.
10 & 11 Vict. c. 89	Town Police Clauses Act 1847	The Town Police Clauses Act, 1847.	Section seventy-six.
10 & 11 Vict. c. 109	Poor Law Board Act 1847	The Poor Law Board Act, 1847.	Section twenty-six from the beginning of the section to " penalties of perjury; and ".
11 & 12 Vict. c. 46	Criminal Procedure Act 1848	The Criminal Procedure Act, 1848.	Section four from "both with regard " to "and otherwise."
12 & 13 Vict. c. 45	Quarter Sessions Act 1849	The Quarter Sessions Act, 1849.	Section ten from " both with regard" to "and otherwise."
12 & 13 Vict. c. 78	House of Lords Costs Taxation Act 1849	The House of Lords Costs Taxation Act, 1849.	Section five from " and any person " to the end of the section.
14 & 15 Vict. c. 100	Criminal Procedure Act 1851	The Criminal Procedure Act, 1851.	In section one, the words " both with " respect to the liability of witnesses to be prosecuted for " perjury and otherwise."
14 & 15 Vict. c. 100	Criminal Procedure Act 1851	The Criminal Procedure Act, 1851.	Sections nineteen, twenty, twenty-one, and twenty-two.
15 & 16 Vict. c. 56	Pharmacy Act 1852	The Pharmacy Act, 1852.	Section sixteen from " shall wilfully " to " under this Act or ".
15 & 16 Vict. c. 57	Election Commissioners Act 1852	The Election Commissioners Act, 1852.	Section thirteen.
16 & 17 Vict. c. 45	Government Annuities Act 1853	The Government Annuities Act, 1853.	Section thirty-two.
16 & 17 Vict. c. 137	Charitable Trusts Act 1853	The Charitable Trusts Act, 1853.	Section thirteen.
19 & 20 Vict. c. 54	Grand Juries Act 1856	The Grand Juries Act, 1856.	In section one, the words " and " every person taking any oath " or affirmation in support of " any bill of indictment who " shall wilfully swear or affirm " falsely shall be deemed guilty " of perjury."
19 & 20 Vict. c. 113	Foreign Tribunals Evidence Act 1856	The Foreign Tribunals Evidence Act, 1856.	Section three from " and if upon such oath ..." to the end of the section.
19 & 20 Vict. c. 119	Marriage and Registration Act 1856	The Marriage and Registration Act, 1856.	Section two from "and every person who shall knowingly" to the end of the section: and section eighteen.
20 & 21 Vict. c. 85	Matrimonial Causes Act 1857	The Matrimonial Causes Act, 1857.	Section fifty.
21 & 22 Vict. c. 78	Parliamentary Witnesses Act 1858	The Parliamentary Witnesses Act, 1858.	Section three.
21 & 22 Vict. c. 90	Medical Act 1858	The Medical Act, 1858	Section thirty-nine.
22 Vict. c. 20	Evidence by Commission Act 1859	The Evidence by Commission Act, 1859.	Section two.
22 & 23 Vict. c. 17	Vexatious Indictments Act 1859	The Vexatious Indictments Act, 1859.	In section one, the words " perjury, subornation of perjury."
24 & 25 Vict. c. 10	Admiralty Court Act 1861	The Admiralty Court Act, 1861.	Section twenty-six from " and any person" to the end of the section.
24 & 25 Vict. c. 53	University Elections Act 1861	The University Elections Act, 1861.	In section five, the words "falsely " making any such declaration as " aforesaid, or such declaration " as is contained in the Schedule, " or," and the words " and any " person wilfully making a false " answer to any question put to " him by the returning or other " officer as herein-before provided ".
25 & 26 Vict. c. 53	Land Registry Act 1862	The Land Registry Act, 1862.	In section one hundred and five, the words " make or assist or join in or be privy to the making of " any material false statement or " representation, or ".
25 & 26 Vict. c. 67	Declaration of Title Act 1862	The Declaration of Title Act, 1862.	In section forty-four, the words " make or assist or join in or be " privy to the making of any " material false statement or " representation or ".
25 & 26 Vict. c. 103	Union Assessment Committee Act 1862	The Union Assessment Committee Act, 1862.	In section forty, the words " or who " upon any examination before " any such committee wilfully " gives false evidence."
26 & 27 Vict. c. 87	Trustee Savings Banks Act 1863	The Trustee Savings Banks Act, 1863.	Section forty-nine from "and if upon such oath" to the end of the section.
27 & 28 Vict. c. 25	Naval Prize Act 1864	The Naval Prize Act, 1864.	Section fifty.
27 & 28 Vict. c. 114	Improvement of Land Act 1864	The Improvement of Land Act, 1864.	Section five.
28 & 29 Vict. c. 36	County Voters Registration Act 1865	The County Voters Registration Act, 1865.	In section eleven, the words "and " any person knowingly and wilfully making any false statement of fact in such declaration."
29 & 30 Vict. c. 62	Crown Lands Act 1866	The Crown Lands Act, 1866.	Section twenty-nine.
29 & 30 Vict. c. 108	Railway Companies Securities Act 1866	The Railway Companies Securities Act, 1866.	In section seventeen, the words " on 5 " conviction thereof on indictment to fine or imprisonment, " or," so far as relates to indictable offences under section sixteen of the same Act.
29 & 30 Vict. c. 109	Naval Discipline Act 1866	The Naval Discipline Act, 1866.	Section sixty-seven from " and where any such offence " to the end of the section.
30 & 31 Vict. c. 84	Vaccination Act 1867	The Vaccination Act, 1867.	Section thirty from " and every person" to the end of the section.
30 & 31 Vict. c. 136	Parliamentary Costs Act 1867	The Parliamentary Costs Act, 1867.	Section two.
31 & 32 Vict. c. 24	Capital Punishment Amendment Act 1868	The Capital Punishment Amendment Act, 1868.	Section nine.
31 & 32 Vict. c. 45	Sea Fisheries Act 1868	The Sea Fisheries Act, 1868.	Section thirty-two from " and any person who wilfully " to " guilty of perjury."
31 & 32 Vict. c. 71	County Courts Admiralty Jurisdiction Act 1868	The County Courts Admiralty Jurisdiction Act, 1868.	Section nineteen from " and any person" to the end of the section.
31 & 32 Vict. c. 119	Regulation of Railways Act 1868	The Regulation of Railways Act, 1868.	In section five, the words " on conviction thereof on indictment to " fine and imprisonment, or".
31 & 32 Vict. c. 119	Regulation of Railways Act 1868	The Regulation of Railways Act, 1868.	In section eight, the words " Any " person who, when so examined "on oath, makes any false statement, knowing the same to be " false, shall be guilty of per-" jury."
31 & 32 Vict. c. 121	Pharmacy Act 1868	The Pharmacy Act, 1868.	Section fourteen from " and any person who shall " to " assisting him therein."
31 & 32 Vict. c. 125	Parliamentary Elections Act 1868	The Parliamentary Elections Act, 1868.	In section thirty-one, the words " and shall be subject to the " same penalties for perjury."
32 & 33 Vict. c. 111	Bishops Resignation Act 1869	The Bishops Resignation Act, 1869.	In section six, the words " and any "person, when examined by " such persons, who wilfully " makes a false statement, " whether on oath or not, shall " be guilty of a misdemeanor."
33 & 34 Vict. c. 102	Naturalization Oath Act 1870	The Naturalization Oath Act, 1870.	Section two.
34 & 35 Vict. c. 36	Pensions Commutation Act 1871	The Pensions Commutation Act, 1871.	In section nine, the words " shall " be deemed to be guilty of a " misdemeanour and" and the words " and to be imprisoned " for any term not exceeding " two years with or without " hard labour."
34 & 35 Vict. c. 78	Regulation of Railways Act 1871	The Regulation of Railways Act, 1871.	In section ten, the words " on conviction thereof on indictment " to fine and imprisonment, or".
34 & 35 Vict. c. 83	Parliamentary Witnesses Oaths Act 1871	The Parliamentary Witnesses Oaths Act, 1871.	In section one, the words " Any " person examined as aforesaid " who wilfully gives false evidence shall be liable to the " penalties of perjury."
35 & 36 Vict. c. 8	Deans and Canons Resignation Act 1872	The Deans and Canons Resignation Act, 1872.	Section four from " and any " person " to " guilty of a misdemeanour."
35 & 36 Vict. c. 93	Pawnbrokers Act 1872	The Pawnbrokers Act, 1872.	Section twenty-nine from " If any "person makes a declaration" .... to the end of the section.
36 & 37 Vict. c. 60	Extradition Act 1873	The Extradition Act, 1873.	Section five from "Every person who " to " perjury."
37 & 38 Vict. c. 88	Births and Deaths Registration Act 1874	The Births and Deaths Registration Act, 1874.	In section forty, subsection one: and, in subsection two, the words " wilfully makes any false certificate or declaration under " or for the purposes of this " Act or " : and subsections three and four.
38 & 39 Vict. c. 55	Public Health Act 1875	The Public Health Act, 1875.	Section two hundred and sixty-three.
38 & 39 Vict. c. 87	Land Transfer Act 1875	The Land Transfer Act, 1875.	Section one hundred and one.
38 & 39 Vict. c. 89	Public Works Loans Act 1875	The Public Works Loans Act, 1875.	Section forty-four from "when examined" to " false evidence or".
39 & 40 Vict. c. 36	Customs Consolidation Act 1876	The Customs Consolidation Act, 1876.	Section thirty-six from " and any witness" to " penalties thereof."
41 & 42 Vict. c. 26	Parliamentary and Municipal Registration Act 1878	The Parliamentary and Municipal Registration Act, 1878.	a section twenty-five, the words " or knowingly and wilfully " makes any false statement of " fact in any declaration of the " nature aforesaid."
41 & 42 Vict. c. 31	Bills of Sale Act 1878	The Bills of Sale Act 1878.	Section seventeen from " Whoever " to the end of the section.
41 & 42 Vict. c. 33	Dentists Act 1878	The Dentists Act, 1878	Section thirty five.
43 & 44 Vict. c. 13	Births and Deaths Registration Act (Ireland) 1880	The Births and Deaths Registration (Ireland) Act, 1880.	In section thirty, subsection one: and, in subsection two, the words " wilfully makes any false certificate or declaration under " or for the purposes of this " Act, or " and subsections three and four.
43 & 44 Vict. c. 19	Taxes Management Act 1880	The Taxes Management Act, 1880.	In section sixty-three, the words " If any person wilfully and " corruptly makes a false statement in any such oath of " service he shall be guilty of " misdemeanor, and shall be " liable to imprisonment for six " months with or without a fine " not exceeding fifty pounds" (being subsection four of the said section).
43 & 44 Vict. c. 41	Burial Laws Amendment Act 1880	The Burials Act, 1880	In section ten, the words "any " person who shall wilfully make " any false statement in such " certificate and ".
44 & 45 Vict. c. 62	Veterinary Surgeons Act 1881	The Veterinary Surgeons Act, 1881.	Section eleven.
45 & 46 Vict. c. 37	Corn Returns Act 1882	The Corn Returns Act, 1882.	In section twelve, the words " false or".
45 & 46 Vict. c. 50	Municipal Corporations Act 1882	The Municipal Corporations Act, 1882.	In section fifty-nine, the words " If " any person wilfully makes a " false answer thereto he shall " be guilty of a misdemeanor " (being subsection three of the said section).
45 & 46 Vict. c. 50	Municipal Corporations Act 1882	The Municipal Corporations Act, 1882.	In section ninety-four, the words " and shall be liable to the same " penalties for perjury."
45 & 46 Vict. c. 51	Government Annuities Act 1882	The Government Annuities Act, 1882.	Section eleven from " If a person " . . .to " twelve months " (being subsection three of the said section).
46 & 47 Vict. c. 51	Corrupt and Illegal Practices Prevention Act 1883	The Corrupt and Illegal Practices Prevention Act, 1883.	In section thirty-three, subsection seven, the words " and on conviction thereof on indictment " shall be liable to the punishment for wilful and corrupt " perjury."
47 & 48 Vict. c. 54	Yorkshire Registries Act 1884	The Yorkshire Registries Act, 1884.	Section forty-seven.
47 & 48 Vict. c. 70	Municipal Elections (Corrupt and Illegal Practices) Act 1884	The Municipal Elections (Corrupt and Illegal Practices) Act, 1884.	In section twenty-one, subsection five, the words " and on conviction thereof on indictment " shall be liable to the punishment for wilful and corrupt " perjury."
48 & 49 Vict. c. 54	Pluralities Acts Amendment Act 1885	The Pluralities Act Amendment Act, 1885.	Section seven from " and every witness " to the end of the section.
50 & 51 Vict. c. 28	Merchandise Marks Act 1887	The Merchandise Marks Act, 1887.	In section eight, subsection (3) the words " on conviction on indictment to the penalties of perjury " and ".
50 & 51 Vict. c. 47	Trustee Savings Banks Act 1887	The Trustee Savings Banks Act, 1887.	In section two, the words " If any " person on examination on oath "or affirmation under this section wilfully gives false evidence, he shall be liable to the " penalties for perjury" (being subsection five of the said section).
51 & 52 Vict. c. 46	Oaths Act 1888	The Oaths Act, 1888.	Section one from " and if any person" to the end of the section.
52 & 53 Vict. c. 10	Commissioners for Oaths Act 1889	The Commissioners of Oaths Act, 1889.	Section seven.
52 & 53 Vict. c. 49	Arbitration Act 1889	The Arbitration Act, 1889.	Section twenty-two.
54 & 55 Vict. c. 70	Markets and Fairs (Weighing of Cattle) Act 1891	The Markets and Pairs (Weighing of Cattle) Act, 1891.	In section three, the words " false or ".
55 & 56 Vict. c. 23	Foreign Marriage Act 1892	The Foreign Marriage Act, 1892.	Section fifteen.
57 & 58 Vict. c. 46	Copyhold Act 1894	The Copyhold Act, 1894.	In section fifty-four, the words " If " any person wilfully gives false " evidence in any proceeding " under this Act he shall be " guilty of perjury" (being subsection five of the said section).
59 & 60 Vict. c. 25	Friendly Societies Act 1896	The Friendly Societies Act, 1896.	In section eighty-seven, the words " false or ".
61 & 62 Vict. c. 48	Benefices Act 1898	The Benefices Act, 1898.	Section four from " For the declaration " . . . to " perjury" (being subsection four of the said section).
62 & 63 Vict. c. 23	Anchors and Chain Cables Act 1899	The Anchors and Chain Cables Act, 1899.	In section thirteen, the words " or " (iii) make any false statement " in a certificate of proof."
2 Edw. 7. c. 8	Cremation Act 1902	The Cremation Act, 1902.	In section eight, subsection two, the words " declaration or ".
2 Edw. 7. c.17	Midwives Act 1902	The Midwives Act, 1902.	Section eleven.
6 Edw. 7. c. 40	Marriage with Foreigners Act 1906	The Marriage with Foreigners Act, 1906.	Section one from "If a person knowingly . . . . " to " country or place" (being subsection two of the said section).
7 Edw. 7. c. 24	Limited Partnerships Act 1907	The Limited Partnerships Act, 1907.	Section twelve.
8 Edw. 7. c. 28	Agricultural Holdings Act 1908	The Agricultural Holdings Act, 1908.	Section thirteen from " Any person who" to " punished accordingly " (being subsection five of the said section).
8 Edw. 7. c. 53	Law of Distress Amendment Act 1908	The Law of Distress Amendment Act, 1908.	Section one from " and if any under tenant" to the end of the section.
8 Edw. 7. c. 69	Companies (Consolidation) Act 1908	The Companies (Consolidation) Act, 1908.	Section two hundred and eighteen: and, in section two hundred and eighty-one, the words " on conviction on indictment to imprisonment for a term not exceeding " two years, with or without hard labour, and", and the words " in either case."
9 Edw. 7. c. 49	Assurance Companies Act 1909	The Assurance Companies Act, 1909.	In section twenty-four, the words " on conviction on indictment to " fine and imprisonment, or".

=== Section 18 - Extent ===
Section 18 of the act reads:

This Act shall not extend to Scotland or Ireland.

The reference to Ireland must now be construed as a reference to Northern Ireland.

== Subsequent developments ==
Section 17, so much of section 19 as related to commencement, and schedule to, act was repealed by section 1 of, and the part I of the schedule to, the Statute Law Revision Act 1927 (17 & 18 Geo. 5. c. 42), which came into force on 22 December 1927.

Section 11 of the act was repealed by section 10 of, and schedule 3 to, the Administration of Justice (Miscellaneous Provisions) Act 1933 (23 & 24 Geo. 5. c. 36), which came into force on 1 September 1933.

Section 10 of the act was repealed by section 10(2) of, and part II of schedule 3 to, the Criminal Law Act 1967, which came into force on 1 January 1968.

Section 9 of the act was repealed by sections 28 and 31(6) of, and schedule 2 to, the Prosecution of Offences Act 1985, which came into force on 1 April 1986.
