= Courts Act 1971 =

Act of the Parliament of the United Kingdom enacted court reform

Courts Act 1971 (Note: Section 59(1).)
- Act of Parliament
- Parliament of the United Kingdom
- Long title: An Act to make further provision as respects the [Senior Courts] and county courts, judges and juries, to establish a Crown Court as part of the [Senior Courts] to try indictments and exercise certain other jurisdiction, to abolish courts of assize and certain other courts and to deal with their jurisdiction and other consequential matters, and to amend in other respects the law about courts and court proceedings. (Note: The words in brackets were substituted on 1 October 2009 by the sections 59 and 148 of, and paragraph 4 of Schedule 11 to, the Constitutional Reform Act 2005. As to commencement see articles 2(b) and (d) of SI 2009/1604.)
- Citation: 1971 c. 23
- Territorial extent: England and Wales (Note: Section 59(5)–(7).)

Dates
- Royal assent: 12 May 1971
- Commencement: 1 October 1971 (in part) (Note: section 20(3), so far as it relates to judges of the Court of Appeal and of the High Court; section 39; section 46; section 56(1) and (4), so far as it relates to the provisions of schedule and schedule 11 referred to below; sections 58 and 59; schedule 8, paragraphs 18(3), 34(2) and 46; schedule 11, part I, so far as it relates to section 96(3) of the County Courts Act 1959(c) and part IV, so far as it relates to section 1(4) of the Magistrates’ Courts Act 1952(d) and to section 1(3) of the Criminal Appeal Act 1966(e)); 1 January 1972 (rest of act)
Other legislation
Amends	Railways Clauses Consolidation Act 1845; Prevention of Damage by Pests Act 1949; Obscene Publications Act 1959; Late Night Refreshment Houses Act 1969See § Repealed enactments
Repeals/revokes	See § Repealed enactments
Amended by	List: Town and Country Planning Act 1971; Poisons Act 1972; Criminal Justice Act 1972; Costs in Criminal Cases Act 1973; Matrimonial Causes Act 1973; Statute Law (Repeals) Act 1973; Powers of Criminal Courts Act 1973; Legal Aid Act 1974; Juries Act 1974; Consumer Credit Act 1974; Friendly Societies Act 1974; House of Commons Disqualification Act 1975; Northern Ireland Assembly Disqualification Act 1975; Inheritance (Provision for Family and Dependants) Act 1975; Lotteries and Amusements Act 1976; Land Drainage Act 1976; Bail Act 1976; Administration of Justice Act 1977; Customs and Excise Management Act 1979; Prosecution of Offences Act 1979; Foster Children Act 1980; Magistrates' Courts Act 1980; Highways Act 1980; Judicial Pensions Act 1981; Animal Health Act 1981; Senior Courts Act 1981; Representation of the People Act 1983; Mental Health Act 1983; County Courts Act 1984; Food Act 1984; Housing (Consequential Provisions) Act 1985; Agricultural Holdings Act 1986; Statute Law (Repeals) Act 1986; Probation Service Act 1993; Statute Law (Repeals) Act 1993; Police and Magistrates' Courts Act 1994; Deregulation and Contracting Out Act 1994; Criminal Procedure and Investigations Act 1996; Secretary of State for the Environment, Transport and the Regions Order 1997; Employment Rights (Dispute Resolution) Act 1998; Statute Law (Repeals) Act 1998; Access to Justice Act 1999; Licensing Act 2003; Courts Act 2003; Criminal Justice Act 2003; Secretary of State for Constitutional Affairs Order 2003; Statute Law (Repeals) Act 2004; Constitutional Reform Act 2005; Mental Capacity Act 2005; Gambling Act 2005; Tribunals, Courts and Enforcement Act 2007; Coroners and Justice Act 2009; Transfer of Tribunal Functions and Revenue and Customs Appeals Order 2009; Transfer of Tribunal Functions (Lands Tribunal and Miscellaneous Amendments) Order 2009; Family Procedure (Modification of Enactments) Order 2011; Crime and Courts Act 2013; Alteration of Judicial Titles (Registrar in Bankruptcy of the High Court) Order 2018; Public Service Pensions and Judicial Offices Act 2022; Judicial Review and Courts Act 2022

Status: Amended

Text of statute as originally enacted

Revised text of statute as amended

Text of the Courts Act 1971 as in force today (including any amendments) within the United Kingdom, from legislation.gov.uk.

The Courts Act 1971 (c. 23) is an act of the Parliament of the United Kingdom, the purpose of which was to reform and modernise the courts system of England and Wales, as well as effectively separating the business of the criminal and civil courts.

It established the Crown Court, introduced the posts of circuit judge and recorder, and abolished various local courts across the country. Many of its provisions have since been repealed by the Senior Courts Act 1981, but the essential structure described in the act is still in place.

== Provisions ==
The first part of the act concerns the new Crown Court. It is established as part of the Supreme Court of Judicature, replacing courts of assize and quarter sessions. The appellate jurisdiction of these courts is transferred, and the new court given exclusive jurisdiction in "trial on indictment". It is described as a "superior court of record" for England and Wales. This section has now been superseded by the Senior Courts Act 1981.

=== Short title, commencement and extent ===
Section 59(1) of the act provided that the act may be cited as the "Courts Act 1971".

Section 59(2) of the act provided that the act would come into force on a day (or days) appointed by the Lord Chancellor by statutory instrument.

Courts Act 1971 (Commencement) Order 1971
- Statutory Instrument
- Parliament of the United Kingdom
- Citation: SI 1971/1151
- Introduced by: Quintin Hogg, Baron Hailsham of St Marylebone (Commons)

Dates
- Made: 14 July 1971
- Laid before Parliament: 27 July 1971
- Commencement: 1 October 1971
Other legislation
Made under	Courts Act 1971

Status: Current legislation

Text of statute as originally enacted

The Courts Act 1971 (Commencement) Order 1971 (SI 1971/1151) provided that the act would come into force on 1 January 1972, except that the following provisions would come into force on 1 October 1971:

- section 20(3), so far as it relates to judges of the Court of Appeal and of the High Court
- section 39
- section 46
- section 56(1) and (4), so far as it relates to the provisions of schedule and schedule 11 referred to below
- sections 58 and 59 schedule 8, paragraphs 18(3), 34(2) and 46
- schedule 11, Part I, so far as it relates to section 96(3) of the County Courts Act 1959 and Part IV, so far as it relates to section 1(4) of the Magistrates' Courts Act 1952 and to section 1(3) of the Criminal Appeal Act 1966

Section 59(5) of the act provided that the act would not extend to Scotland unless expressly provided in the subsections.

Section 59(6) of the act provided that the act would not extend to Ireland unless expressly provided in the subsections.

Section 59(7) of the act provided that schedule 8 to the act would extend to the Isle of Man and the Channel Islands so far as it amends section 13 of the Indictable Offences Act 1848 (11 & 12 Vict. c. 42).

== History ==
Report of the Royal Commission on Assizes and Quarter Sessions (Sessional Papers, House of Commons, Cmnd 4153, 1966–69, XXVIII, 433) was published in 1969 and chaired by Dr. Beeching. The act was based on most of the report recommendations.

The courts abolished by this act are:

- all assize courts
- all quarter sessions
- The Court of Chancery of the County Palatine of Lancaster (merged with the High Court)
- The Court of Chancery of the County Palatine of Durham and Sadberge (merged with the High Court)
- The Mayor's and City of London Court (a new county court is established with the same name)
- The Tolzey and Pie Poudre Courts of the City and County of Bristol
- The Liverpool Court of Passage
- The Norwich Guildhall Court
- The Court of Record for the Hundred of Salford

The officers of these courts were generally eligible to become circuit judges.

The post of circuit judge is introduced in the second part of the act. They sit in the Crown Court and county courts, are appointed by the monarch on the Lord Chancellor's advice, and retire at the age of 72 (this has now been changed to 70 by the Judicial Pensions and Retirement Act 1993). The Lord Chancellor may also sack a circuit judge on the grounds of "incapacity or misbehaviour". Judges are to have a salary and pension, and must take an oath of office. The act also introduces part-time Crown Court judges, known as recorders—also appointed by the Lord Chancellor. (Since the Constitutional Reform Act 2005, appointing judges has been reformed and is now done by the Judicial Appointments Commission in England and Wales, and equivalent bodies in Scotland and Northern Ireland.)

The fourth part of the act governs the selection of juries and related rules; it has since been repealed by the Juries Act 1974. Most of the remainder of the act is about other miscellaneous administrative provisions relating to appointments, payment, and accommodation; these have almost all been repealed by the Supreme Court Act and other justice legislation.

== Provisions ==
=== Repealed enactments ===
Section 56(4) of the act repealed 256 enactments, listed in schedule 11 to the act.

Part I - Juries
Citation	Short title	Extent of repeal
6 Geo. 4. c. 50	Juries Act 1825	The whole act except sections 1, 27, 29 and 50.
6 Geo. 4. c. 50	Juries Act 1825	In section 27 the words from " provided that nothing " to the end of the section.
6 Geo. 4. c. 50	Juries Act 1825	In section 50 the words from " Provided also " to the end of the section.
7 Geo. 4. c. 64	Criminal Law Act 1826	Section 21.
1 & 2 Vict. c. 4	Quarter Sessions Act 1837	The whole act.
15 & 16 Vict. c. 76	Common Law Procedure Act 1852	Sections 105 to 115.
17 & 18 Vict. c. 125	Common Law Procedure Act 1854	Section 59.
25 & 26 Vict. c. 107	Juries Act 1862	The whole act.
33 & 34 Vict. c. 77	Juries Act 1870	Section 6.
33 & 34 Vict. c. 77	Juries Act 1870	Section 19.
33 & 34 Vict. c. 77	Juries Act 1870	Section 20 except as respects service at a coroner's court.
33 & 34 Vict. c. 77	Juries Act 1870	Section 21.
33 & 34 Vict. c. 77	Juries Act 1870	In section 23 the words from " be allowed at" to " court, and ".
33 & 34 Vict. c. 77	Juries Act 1870	Section 24.
33 & 34 Vict. c. 77	Juries Act 1870	In the Schedule, in the entry beginning " Officers of the courts " the words " and the clerks of the peace or their deputies " and the penultimate three entries, that is the words from " Members of the council" to " he is a justice ".
45 & 46 Vict. c. 50	Municipal Corporations Act 1882	Section 186.
50 & 51 Vict. c. 55	Sheriffs Act 1887	Section 12.
50 & 51 Vict. c. 55	Sheriffs Act 1887	In section 26 the words "to impanel or return any inquest, jury or tales, or ".
50 & 51 Vict. c. 55	Sheriffs Act 1887	In the second form in Schedule 2 all the words following " I shall remain therein ".
10 Edw. 7 & 1 Geo. 5. c. 17	County Common Juries Act 1910	The whole act.
9 & 10 Geo. 5. c. 71	Sex Disqualification (Removal) Act 1919	In section 1 the words from the last " and " in proviso (a) to " the Indictments Act 1915 ".
12 & 13 Geo. 5. c. 11	Juries Act 1922	Sections 3, 4 and 5.
12 & 13 Geo. 5. c. 11	Juries Act 1922	In section 7 the definition of " sheriff".
12 & 13 Geo. 5. c. 11	Juries Act 1922	In section 8(2)(b) the words "(without prejudice to the provisions of section thirty-seven of the Juries Act 1825) ".
11 & 12 Geo. 6. c. 58	Criminal Justice Act 1948	Section 35(3).
12, 13 & 14 Geo. 6. c. 27	Juries Act 1949	Sections 2 to 9.
12, 13 & 14 Geo. 6. c. 27	Juries Act 1949	Section 11.
12, 13 & 14 Geo. 6. c. 27	Juries Act 1949	In section 14 paragraphs (c) and (d).
12, 13 & 14 Geo. 6. c. 27	Juries Act 1949	Sections 18 and 19.
12, 13 & 14 Geo. 6. c. 27	Juries Act 1949	Section 22.
12, 13 & 14 Geo. 6. c. 86	Electoral Registers Act 1949	In Schedule 2 the amendment of section 1(8) of the Juries Act 1922.
7 & 8 Eliz. 2. c. 22	County Courts Act 1959	Section 95.
7 & 8 Eliz. 2. c. 22	County Courts Act 1959	Section 96(3)
1964 c. 42	Administration of Justice Act 1964	In section 21, subsections (3) and (4), subsection (5)(b)(c) and subsections (7), (8) and (9).
1967 c. 80	Criminal Justice Act 1967	Section 14(5).
1969 c. 48	Post Office Act 1969	In Schedule 4, in paragraph 14 the words " section 11 of the Juries Act 1862 and " and the word " each ".
1970 c. 9	Taxes Management Act 1970	In section 5(2) the words " in the county wherein he dwells ".

Part II - Local Courts
Citation	Short title	Extent of repeal
26 Hen. 8. c. 14	Jurisdiction in Liberties Act 1535	Section 3 so far as saved from repeal by Schedule 5 to the Justices of the Peace Act 1968.
6 & 7 Will. 4. c. 19	Durham (County Palatine) Act 1836	In section 1, the proviso.
13 & 14 Vict. c. 43	Court of Chancery of Lancaster Act 1850	The whole act.
15 & 16 Vict. c. lxxvii	London (City) Small Debts Extension Act 1852	The whole act.
17 & 18 Vict. c. 82	Court of Chancery of Lancaster Act 1854	The whole act.
31 & 32 Vict. c. cxxx	Salford Hundred Court of Record Act 1868	The whole act.
35 & 36 Vict. c. 86	Borough and Local Courts of Record Act 1872	Section 8.
51 & 52 Vict. c. 57	Statute Law Revision (No. 2) Act 1888	In section 2 the words " to the court of the county palatine of Lancaster or ".
52 & 53 Vict. c. 47	Palatine Court of Durham Act 1889	The whole act.
53 & 54 Vict. c. 23	Chancery of Lancaster Act 1890	The whole act.
53 & 54 Vict. c. 33	Statute Law Revision Act 1890	In section 4 the words " to the court of the county palatine of Lancaster or ".
53 & 54 Vict. c. 39	Partnership Act 1890	In section 23(2) the words " or the Chancery Court of the County Palatine of Lancaster ".
53 & 54 Vict. c. 51	Statute Law Revision (No. 2) Act 1890	In section 2 the words " to the court of the county palatine of Lancaster or ".
55 & 56 Vict. c. 19	Statute Law Revision Act 1892	In section 2 the words " to the court of the county palatine of Lancaster or ".
56 & 57 Vict. c. 14	Statute Law Revision Act 1893	In section 2 the words " to the court of the county palatine of Lancaster or ".
56 & 57 Vict. c. 54	Statute Law Revision (No. 2) Act 1893	In section 2 the words " to the court of the county palatine of Lancaster or ".
57 & 58 Vict. c. 56	Statute Law Revision Act 1894	In section 2 the words " to the court of the county palatine of Lancaster or ".
59 & 60 Vict. c. 8	Life Insurance Companies (Payment into Court) Act 1896	In section 3 the words from " or where " to " Court " in the last place where it occurs.
59 & 60 Vict. c. 8	Life Insurance Companies (Payment into Court) Act 1896	In section 4 the words " or the Palatine Court, as the case may be ".
59 & 60 Vict. c. 35	Judicial Trustees Act 1896	In section 2 the words " and as respects trusts within its jurisdiction by a Palatine Court ".
8 Edw. 7. c. 49	Statute Law Revision Act 1908	In section 2 the words " to the court of the county palatine of Lancaster or ".
1 & 2 Geo. 5. c. clxxii	Salford Hundred Court of Record Act 1911	The whole act.
11 & 12 Geo. 5. c. lxxiv	Liverpool Corporation Act 1921	Sections 244 to 263.
12 & 13 Geo. 5. c. 16	Law of Property Act 1922	In section 188(6) the words from " and also " to " have jurisdiction", except the words " or the county court ".
15 & 16 Geo. 5. c. 18	Settled Land Act 1925	Section 113(2).
15 & 16 Geo. 5. c. 19	Trustee Act 1925	In section 67, in subsection (1) the words from " and also " to " Durham " and in subsection (2) the words " Palatine Courts and ".
15 & 16 Geo. 5. c. 20	Law of Property Act 1925	In section 203(3) the words from "and also" to " Durham ".
15 & 16 Geo. 5. c. 21	Land Registration Act 1925	In section 3(ii) the words from " and also " to " Durham ".
15 & 16 Geo. 5. c. 21	Land Registration Act 1925	In section 138(1) the words from "and also" to " Durham ".
15 & 16 Geo. 5. c. 21	Land Registration Act 1925	In section 143(3) the words " or by the Court of Chancery of Lancaster or Durham " and the words " or such Court of Chancery respectively".
15 & 16 Geo. 5. c. 23	Administration of Estates Act 1925	In section 55(1)(iv) the words from " and as respects " to the end of paragraph (iv).
15 & 16 Geo. 5. c. 22	Land Charges Act 1925	In section 20(2) the words from " also " to " Durham ".
15 & 16 Geo. 5. c. 49	Supreme Court of Judicature (Consolidation) Act 1925	Section 28.
15 & 16 Geo. 5. c. 49	Supreme Court of Judicature (Consolidation) Act 1925	In section 209 the words " to the Court of the County Palatine of Lancaster. or ".
17 & 18 Geo. 5. c. 42	Statute Law Revision Act 1927	In section 2 the words " to the court of the county palatine of Lancaster or ".
18 & 19 Geo. 5. c. 26	Administration of Justice Act 1928	Section 14(1).
23 & 24 Geo. 5. c. 13	Foreign Judgments (Reciprocal Enforcement) Act 1933	In section 11(1), in the definition of " Judgments given in the superior courts of the United Kingdom " the words from "the Court of Chancery" in the first place where they occur to " Durham ".
1 & 2 Geo. 6. c. 22.	Trade Marks Act 1938	Section 39(12).
1 & 2 Geo. 6. c. 45.	Inheritance (Family Provision) Act 1938	In section 5(1), in the definition of " the court ", as originally enacted, the words from " and also " to " jurisdiction ", and in that definition as set out in Schedule 3 to the Family Provision Act 1966, the words from "the Court of Chancery ", where those words first occur, to " Durham or ".
1 & 2 Geo. 6. c. 63.	Administration of Justice (Miscellaneous Provisions) Act 1938	Section 15.
11 & 12 Geo. 6. c. 38.	Companies Act 1948	Section 218(2).
11 & 12 Geo. 6. c. 38.	Companies Act 1948	Section 365(4).
11 & 12 Geo. 6. c. 62.	Statute Law Revision Act 1948	In section 2 the words " to the court of the county palatine of Lancaster or ".
14 Geo. 6. c. 6.	Statute Law Revision Act 1950	In section 2 the words " to the court of the county palatine of Lancaster or ".
15 & 16 Geo. 6. & 1 Eliz. 2. c. 49	Court of Chancery of Lancaster Act 1952	The whole act.
2 & 3 Eliz. 2. c. 5	Statute Law Revision Act 1953	In section 2 the words " to the court of the county palatine of Lancaster or ".
2 & 3 Eliz. 2. c. xlviii	Manchester Corporation Act 1954	Section 83.
4 & 5 Eliz. 2. c. 46	Administration of Justice Act 1956	Section 2.
4 & 5 Eliz. 2. c. 46	Administration of Justice Act 1956	In section 3, in subsections (1) and (3) the words "the Liverpool Court of Passage ", in subsection (4) the words from " and (where" to " Passage " and in subsections (5), (6) and (7) the words " the Liverpool Court of Passage ".
4 & 5 Eliz. 2. c. 46	Administration of Justice Act 1956	In section 4(6) the words " the Liverpool Court of Passage ".
4 & 5 Eliz. 2. c. 46	Administration of Justice Act 1956	Section 52.
5 & 6 Eliz. 2. c. 56	Housing Act 1957	In section 164(3) the words from " and the Court" to " Durham ".
6 & 7 Eliz. 2. c. 51	Public Records Act 1958	In section 8(1), the proviso.
6 & 7 Eliz. 2. c. 51	Public Records Act 1958	In Schedule 1, paragraph 4(1)(c).
7 & 8 Eliz. 2. c. 22	County Courts Act 1959	In section 55(1), the proviso.
7 & 8 Eliz. 2. c. 22	County Courts Act 1959	In section 140(3) the words from " and includes " to the end of the subsection.
7 & 8 Eliz. 2. c. 22	County Courts Act 1959	Section 169.
7 & 8 Eliz. 2. c. 22	County Courts Act 1959	In section 174(2) the words " or the Mayor's and City of London Court Funds' Rules, as the case may be ".
7 & 8 Eliz. 2. c. 22	County Courts Act 1959	In section 175 the words from "or the Mayor's" to the end of the section.
7 & 8 Eliz. 2. c. 22	County Courts Act 1959	In section 176 the words from " Mayor's " to " of this Act ".
7 & 8 Eliz. 2. c. 22	County Courts Act 1959	In section 180(2) the words from " (other " to " court) ".
7 & 8 Eliz. 2. c. 22	County Courts Act 1959	Section 183(3).
7 & 8 Eliz. 2. c. 22	County Courts Act 1959	Section 197.
7 & 8 Eliz. 2. c. 72	Mental Health Act 1959	In Schedule 7, the amendments of the Court of Chancery of Lancaster Act 1850.
8 & 9 Eliz. 2. c. 58	Charities Act 1960	In section 46, the definition of " Attorney General".
8 & 9 Eliz. 2. c. 65	Administration of Justice Act 1960	In section 13(2)(b) the words " of the Chancery Court of a County Palatine ".
9 & 10 Eliz. 2. c. 38	Court of Chancery of Lancaster (Amendment) Act 1961	The whole act.
1965 c. 2.	Administration of Justice Act 1965	Section 11.
1965 c. 2.	Administration of Justice Act 1965	In section 19(1), the words " or the Mayor's and City of London Court".
1968 c. 23.	Rent Act 1968	In section 95(6), the words from " or the Court of Chancery" to "Durham".
1969 c. 46.	Family Law Reform Act 1969	In section 6(1) the words from " the Court of Chancery " in the first place where they occur to " Durham ".
1969 c. 46.	Family Law Reform Act 1969	In section 7(1), the words from " the Court of Chancery " in the first place where thev occur to " Durham ".
1969 c. 58.	Administration of Justice Act 1969	Section 32.
1970 c. 31.	Administration of Justice Act 1970	In section 37(1) the words " or the county palatine of Lancaster ".

Part III - Costs in Criminal Cases
Chapter	Short Title	Extent of Repeal
15 & 16 Geo. 6 & 1 Eliz. 2. c. 48	Costs in Criminal Cases Act 1952	Sections 1 to 4.
15 & 16 Geo. 6 & 1 Eliz. 2. c. 48	Costs in Criminal Cases Act 1952	In section 5, in subsections (3) and (4), the words " and giving evidence ".
15 & 16 Geo. 6 & 1 Eliz. 2. c. 48	Costs in Criminal Cases Act 1952	Section 11.
15 & 16 Geo. 6 & 1 Eliz. 2. c. 48	Costs in Criminal Cases Act 1952	Section 15.
15 & 16 Geo. 6 & 1 Eliz. 2. c. 48	Costs in Criminal Cases Act 1952	Section 17(5).
8 & 9 Eliz. 2. c. 65	Administration of Justice Act 1960	In Schedule 3, the amendments of the Costs in Criminal Cases Act 1952.
10 & 11 Eliz. 2. c. 15	Criminal Justice Administration Act 1962	Section 18.
1963 c. 2.	Betting, Gaming and Lotteries Act 1963	In Schedule 1, sub-paragraphs (2) to (4) of paragraph 23.
1964 c. 26.	Licensing Act 1964	In section 25, subsections (2) to (4).
1964 c. 42.	Administration of Justice Act 1964	In Schedule 3, paragraph 21 and paragraph 31(2)(3).
1967 c. 52.	Tokyo Convention Act 1967	Section 7(5).
1967 c. 58.	Criminal Law Act 1967	In Schedule 2, paragraph 15(2) from " and in relation" to the end of the paragraph.
1967 c. 80.	Criminal Justice Act 1967	In section 31, subsections (3) to (6).
1967 c. 80.	Criminal Justice Act 1967	Section 32(1).
1967 c. 80.	Criminal Justice Act 1967	In section 81, subsections (5), (6) and (7).
1967 c. 80.	Criminal Justice Act 1967	In Schedule 4, paragraphs 21 and 22.
1968 c. 19.	Criminal Appeal Act 1968	Section 28(3).
1968 c. 19.	Criminal Appeal Act 1968	In Schedule 5, the amendments to sections 7, 8, 10 and 11 of the Costs in Criminal Cases Act 1952.
1968 c. 65.	Gaming Act 1968	In Schedule 2, sub-paragraphs (3) to (5) of paragraph 30 and in paragraph 32(2) the words " to (5)".
1968 c. 65.	Gaming Act 1968	In Schedule 9, sub-paragraphs (3) to (5) of paragraph 14.
1968 c. 69.	Justices of the Peace Act 1968	In Schedule 3, in paragraph 4, sub-paragraph (1) from " or " in the first place where it occurs to the end of the sub-paragraph and sub-paragraph (3).

Part IV - Other Repeals
Citation	Short title	Extent of repeal
33 Hen. 8. c. 39	Crown Debts Act 1541	Section 37.
34 & 35 Hen. 8. c. 26.	Laws in Wales Act 1542	Section 21.
31 Chas. 2. c. 2	Habeas Corpus Act 1679	Section 6.
31 Chas. 2. c. 2	Habeas Corpus Act 1679	Sections 17 and 18.
16 Geo. 2. c. 18	Justices Jurisdiction Act 1742	Section 3.
25 Geo. 2. c. 36	Disorderly Houses Act 1751	Section 10.
32 Geo. 3. c. 56	Servants' Characters Act 1792	Section 10.
38 Geo. 3. c. 52	Counties of Cities Act 1798	The whole act.
44 Geo. 3. c. 102	Habeas Corpus Act 1804	In section 1 the words from " or any justice of oyer " to " baron as aforesaid " and the words " or any sitting of nisi prius" and the words " grand, petit or other ".
51 Geo. 3. c. 100	Counties of Cities Act 1811	The whole act.
52 Geo. 3. c. 155	Places of Religious Worship Act 1812	In section 7 the words from " before or at " to the end of the section.
52 Geo. 3. c. 155	Places of Religious Worship Act 1812	In section 10 the words " or the courts of the counties palatine of Lancaster, and Durham (as the case shall require)".
52 Geo. 3. c. 155	Places of Religious Worship Act 1812	Section 12.
52 Geo. 3. c. 155	Places of Religious Worship Act 1812	Sections 16 and 17.
54 Geo. 3. c. 159	Harbours Act 1814	Section 23.
54 Geo. 3. c. 159	Harbours Act 1814	Section 26.
57 Geo. 3. c. 91	Clerks of the Peace (Fees) Act 1817	The whole act.
57 Geo. 3. c. 93	Distress (Costs) Act 1817	In section 7 the words " either " and " Quarter or other ".
59 Geo. 3. c. 7	Cutlery Trade Act 1819	Section 9.
59 Geo. 3. c. 7	Cutlery Trade Act 1819	In section 10 the words " and also for the said justices in quarter sessions assembled " and the word " respectively ".
60 Geo. 3 & 1 Geo. 4. c. 1	Unlawful Drilling Act 1819	In section 2 the words from " and it shall be lawful " to the end of the section.
4 Geo. 4. c. 48	Judgment of Death Act 1823	The whole act.
7 Geo. 4. c. 63	County Buildings Act 1826	The whole act.
7 Geo. 4. c. 64	Criminal Law Act 1826	Sections 12 and 13.
7 Geo. 4. c. 64	Criminal Law Act 1826	Section 31.
9 Geo. 4. c. 69	Night Poaching Act 1828	Sections 6, 7 and 8.
11 Geo. 4. & 1 Will. 4. c. 70	Law Terms Act 1830	Section 15.
1 & 2 Will. 4. c. 32	Game Act 1831	Section 44.
3 & 4 Will. 4. c. 35	Inclosure and Drainage (Rates) Act 1833	In section 3 the words from " which shall be holden " to the end of the section.
3 & 4 Will. 4. c. 35	Inclosure and Drainage (Rates) Act 1833	In section 4 the words " or adjudication made on appeal therefrom ".
3 & 4 Will. 4. c. 41	Judicial Committee Act 1833	Sections 10, 11 and 12.
5 & 6 Will. 4. c. 50	Highways Act 1835	Sections 105 to 108.
7 Will. 4. & 1 Vict. c. 24	County Buildings Act 1837	The whole act.
7 Will. 4. & 1 Vict. c. 77	Central Criminal Court Act 1837	The whole act.
1 & 2 Vict. c. 38	Vagrancy Act 1838	Section 1.
2 & 3 Vict. c. 69	Judges' Lodgings Act 1839	The whole act.
2 & 3 Vict. c. 71	Metropolitan Police Courts Act 1839	Section 32.
3 & 4 Vict. c. 92	Non-Parochial Registers Act 1840	In section 11, the words " on the trial of any cause in any of the courts of common law, or " and the words from " at any session " to " Wales ".
3 & 4 Vict. c. 110	Loan Societies Act 1840	In section 4, the words following " general quarter sessions " to " transmitted to him as aforesaid", and the words " without motion ".
4 & 5 Vict. c. 30	Ordnance Survey Act 1841	In section 2, the words from " who shall hear " to the end of the section.
4 & 5 Vict. c. 30	Ordnance Survey Act 1841	In section 5 the words from " and in case it shall happen " to " in the execution of the purposes of this Act ".
4 & 5 Vict. c. 30	Ordnance Survey Act 1841	In section 6 the words " or by such inhabitants as aforesaid ".
5 & 6 Vict. c. 38	Quarter Sessions Act 1842	The whole act.
6 & 7 Vict. c. 98	Slave Trade Act 1843	In section 4 the words from " or information" to " Queen's Bench ", the words " or informations respectively " and the words " in Her Majesty's said Court of Queen's Bench".
7 & 8 Vict. c. 33	County Rates Act 1844	Section 7.
8 & 9 Vict. c. 16	Companies Clauses Consolidation Act 1845	Section 160.
10 & 11 Vict. c. 16	Commissioners Clauses Act 1847	In section 3 the definition of " quarter sessions ".
10 & 11 Vict. c. 16	Commissioners Clauses Act 1847	Section 93.
10 & 11 Vict. c. 27	Harbours, Docks and Pier Clauses Act 1847	Section 26.
10 & 11 Vict. c. 27	Harbours, Docks and Pier Clauses Act 1847	In section 85 the words " England or ".
10 & 11 Vict. c. 27	Harbours, Docks and Pier Clauses Act 1847	In section 90 the words " or the court of quarter sessions", the words " or of the chairman of the court " and the words " or chairman ".
10 & 11 Vict. c. 28	County Buildings Act 1847	The whole act.
10 & 11 Vict. c. 34	Towns Improvement Clauses Act 1847	In section 3 the definition beginning " The expression ' quarter sessions ' ".
10 & 11 Vict. c. 34	Towns Improvement Clauses Act 1847	In section 185 the words from " holden " to " poor rates ", and the words from " but no such appeal " to the end of the section.
10 & 11 Vict. c. 34	Towns Improvement Clauses Act 1847	In section 186 the words from " holden " to the end of the section.
10 & 11 Vict. c. 34	Towns Improvement Clauses Act 1847	Section 187.
10 & 11 Vict. c. 34	Towns Improvement Clauses Act 1847	In section 189 the words from " and shall likewise" to " within their jurisdiction ".
10 & 11 Vict. c. 34	Towns Improvement Clauses Act 1847	Section 190.
10 & 11 Vict. c. 89	Town Police Clauses Act 1847	In section 3 the definition beginning " The expression ' Quarter sessions ' ".
11 & 12 Vict. c. 42	Indictable Offences Act 1848	In section 32 the words from " and also nothing " to the end of the section.
11 & 12 Vict. c. 43	Summary Jurisdiction Act 1848	The whole act.
12 & 13 Vict. c. 45	Quarter Sessions Act 1849	The whole act.
12 & 13 Vict. c. 109	Petty Bag Act 1849	The whole act.
13 & 14 Vict. c. 26	Piracy Act 1850	In section 6 the words from " in Her Majesty's " to the end of the section except for the words " in England ".
14 & 15 Vict. c. 100	Criminal Procedure Act 1851	Section 27.
14 & 15 Vict. c. 100	Criminal Procedure Act 1851	In section 30 the words " and any nisi prius record ".
16 & 17 Vict. c. 30	Criminal Procedure Act 1853	Section 2.
18 & 19 Vict. c. 15	Judgments Act 1855	The whole act.
21 & 22 Vict. c. 73	Stipendiary Magistrates Act 1858	In section 3, the words from " acts to be " to " sessions or to".
21 & 22 Vict. c. 73	Stipendiary Magistrates Act 1858	Sections 9 to 12
24 & 25 Vict. c. 45	General Pier and Harbour Act 1861	In section 15 the words " England and ".
24 & 25 Vict. c. 97	Malicious Damage Act 1861	Section 68.
24 & 25 Vict. c. 97	Malicious Damage Act 1861	In section 69 the words " or adjudication made on appeal therefrom ".
25 & 26 Vict. c. 114	Poaching Prevention Act 1862	In section 5 the words " or adjudication made on appeal therefrom ".
25 & 26 Vict. c. 114	Poaching Prevention Act 1862	Section 6.
27 & 28 Vict. c. 25	Naval Prize Act 1864	In section 46 the words from " to be proceeded against " to " Admiralty, and ".
27 & 28 Vict. c. 39	Union Assessment Committee Amendment Act 1864	The whole act.
28 & 29 Vict. c. 104	Crown Suits Act 1865	The whole act.
30 & 31 Vict. c. 35	Criminal Law Amendment Act 1867	In section 6 (as amended by the Magistrates' Courts Act 1952) the words " clerk of assize, clerk of the peace or other ".
30 & 31 Vict. c. 36	Chester Courts Act 1867	The whole act.
30 & 31 Vict. c. 48	Sale of Land by Auction Act 1867	In section 8 the words " or of the Court of Chancery in the County Palatine of Lancaster ".
30 & 31 Vict. c. 115	Justices of the Peace Act 1867	The whole act.
32 & 33 Vict. c. 62	Debtors Act 1869	In section 10 the words from "As respects any other court " to " judge of such court ".
32 & 33 Vict. c. 62	Debtors Act 1869	Section 29.
35 & 36 Vict. c. 51	Judges Salaries Act 1872	In section 4 the words " county court judge ".
37 & 38 Vict. c. 45	County of Hertford and Liberty of St. Alban Act 1874	Sections 16 to 20.
37 & 38 Vict. c. 45	County of Hertford and Liberty of St. Alban Act 1874	Sections 36 and 37.
37 & 38 Vict. c. 45	County of Hertford and Liberty of St. Alban Act 1874	Section 42.
38 & 39 Vict. c. 17	Explosives Act 1875	In section 75 the words from " where the justices" to " other local authority " and " itself".
38 & 39 Vict. c. 55	Public Health Act 1875	In section 4 the definition of "court of quarter sessions ".
38 & 39 Vict. c. 86	Conspiracy and Protection of Property Act 1875	Section 12.
38 & 39 Vict. c. 89	Public Works Loans Act 1875	In section 33 the words from " The Court of Exchequer " to " the proceeding ".
39 & 40 Vict. c. 57	Winter Assizes Act 1876	The whole act.
39 & 40 Vict. c. 77	Cruelty to Animals Act 1876	Section 16.
40 & 41 Vict. c. 46	Winter Assizes Act 1877	The whole act.
41 & 42 Vict. c. 50	County of Hertford Act 1878	The whole act.
42 & 43 Vict. c. 1	Spring Assizes Act 1879	The whole act.
42 & 43 Vict. c. 19	Habitual Drunkards Act 1879	Section 30.
42 & 43 Vict. c. 49	Summary Jurisdiction Act 1879	The whole act.
44 & 45 Vict. c. 60	Newspaper Libel and Registration Act 1881	In section 16 the words from " and enforced " to the end of the section.
45 & 46 Vict. c. 31	Inferior Courts Judgments Extension Act 1882	In section 4 the words from " or, in the City " to " London Court".
45 & 46 Vict. c. 50	Municipal Corporations Act 1882	In section 105 the words " quarter and " and the words " or an assize courthouse with or without judge's lodgings ".
45 & 46 Vict. c. 50	Municipal Corporations Act 1882	Section 150, but not so as to affect the areas which are rating areas at the commencement of this Act.
45 & 46 Vict. c. 50	Municipal Corporations Act 1882	Section 151.
45 & 46 Vict. c. 50	Municipal Corporations Act 1882	In section 152(1) the words from "in addition" to " section ".
45 & 46 Vict. c. 50	Municipal Corporations Act 1882	In section 153(1) the words " and having a separate court of quarter sessions" and paragraph (a).
45 & 46 Vict. c. 50	Municipal Corporations Act 1882	In section 154(2) the words " exercisable out of quarter sessions ".
45 & 46 Vict. c. 50	Municipal Corporations Act 1882	In section 158(1) the words from " except that" to the end of the subsection.
45 & 46 Vict. c. 50	Municipal Corporations Act 1882	In section 159(3) the words " at any court of gaol delivery or quarter sessions ".
45 & 46 Vict. c. 50	Municipal Corporations Act 1882	Sections 162 to 168.
45 & 46 Vict. c. 50	Municipal Corporations Act 1882	Sections 175 to 177.
45 & 46 Vict. c. 50	Municipal Corporations Act 1882	Section 185.
45 & 46 Vict. c. 50	Municipal Corporations Act 1882	In section 187 the words " or of a separate court of quarter sessions ".
45 & 46 Vict. c. 50	Municipal Corporations Act 1882	Sections 188 and 189.
45 & 46 Vict. c. 50	Municipal Corporations Act 1882	Section 219(2).
45 & 46 Vict. c. 50	Municipal Corporations Act 1882	Section 225(7).
45 & 46 Vict. c. 50	Municipal Corporations Act 1882	In section 234 the words " by the clerk of the peace (if any) for the borough " and paragraph (c).
45 & 46 Vict. c. 50	Municipal Corporations Act 1882	In section 248(2) the words " court of quarter sessions " (where they first occur), " recorder " and the words " and clerk of the peace ".
45 & 46 Vict. c. 50	Municipal Corporations Act 1882	Section 252.
45 & 46 Vict. c. 50	Municipal Corporations Act 1882	In Schedule 5 paragraphs 4 and 6.
45 & 46 Vict. c. 50	Municipal Corporations Act 1882	Schedule 6.
45 & 46 Vict. c. 72	Revenue, Friendly Societies and National Debt Act 1882	Section 24(c).
46 & 47 Vict. c. 18	Municipal Corporations Act 1883	In subsections (2) and (3) of section 15 the word " Recorder ".
50 & 51 Vict. c. 55	Sheriffs Act 1887	Section 9.
50 & 51 Vict. c. 55	Sheriffs Act 1887	Section 13.
50 & 51 Vict. c. 55	Sheriffs Act 1887	In section 14 subsections (2) and (3).
50 & 51 Vict. c. 55	Sheriffs Act 1887	In section 29(3) the words " any court of assize, oyer and terminer or gaol delivery ".
50 & 51 Vict. c. 55	Sheriffs Act 1887	Section 19.
50 & 51 Vict. c. 55	Sheriffs Act 1887	In section 34(e) the words " to the return of panels or juries, or".
50 & 51 Vict. c. 55	Sheriffs Act 1887	Section 35.
50 & 51 Vict. c. 55	Sheriffs Act 1887	In section 36(4) the words from " and any jurisdiction " to the end of the section.
50 & 51 Vict. c. 71	Coroners Act 1887	In section 10(1) the words " found by a grand jury ".
50 & 51 Vict. c. 71	Coroners Act 1887	Section 15.
51 & 52 Vict. c. 41	Local Government Act 1888	In section 3 paragraph (iv), in paragraph (ix) the words " the clerk of the peace and ", in paragraph (x) the words " the clerk of the peace and ".
51 & 52 Vict. c. 41	Local Government Act 1888	Section 8.
51 & 52 Vict. c. 41	Local Government Act 1888	In section 31 the words from " and if" in the proviso to the end of the section.
51 & 52 Vict. c. 41	Local Government Act 1888	In section 32(3) paragraph (a) and in paragraph (b) the words " quarter sessions and " and the words from " and if " to the end of the paragraph.
51 & 52 Vict. c. 41	Local Government Act 1888	In section 34(1)(a) the words " clerk of the peace and ".
51 & 52 Vict. c. 41	Local Government Act 1888	Section 35(5).
51 & 52 Vict. c. 41	Local Government Act 1888	Section 37.
51 & 52 Vict. c. 41	Local Government Act 1888	In section 42(12) the words " Quarter sessions", the words " may be held and " and the words from " but no jurors" to the end of the subsection.
51 & 52 Vict. c. 41	Local Government Act 1888	In section 46(5) the words " chairman of quarter sessions or " and the words " or for any assize courts" and the words " chairman or ".
51 & 52 Vict. c. 41	Local Government Act 1888	Section 64(1)(a).
51 & 52 Vict. c. 41	Local Government Act 1888	Section 81.
51 & 52 Vict. c. 41	Local Government Act 1888	In section 83, subsections (4) and (9).
51 & 52 Vict. c. 41	Local Government Act 1888	In section 100 in the definition of court costs the words " of assizes and ", " quarter and ", the words from " the judges' lodgings " to " peace ", " the costs of the jury lists " and the words from " the assizes " to " the judges " except for the words "petty sessions ".
52 & 53 Vict. c. 10	Commissioners for Oaths Act 1889	In section 1(2) the words from " including all proceedings " to the end of the subsection.
52 & 53 Vict. c. 12	Assizes Relief Act 1889	The whole act.
52 & 53 Vict. c. 63	Interpretation Act 1889	In section 13 paragraphs (4), (5) and (14).
54 & 55 Vict. c. 40	Brine Pumping (Compensation for Subsidence) Act 1891	In section 42 the words from " The provisions of section 31 "to the end of the section.
57 & 58 Vict. c. 60	Merchant Shipping Act 1894	Section 682.
63 & 64 Vict. c. 27	Railway Employment (Prevention of Accidents) Act 1900	Section 11(2).
6 Edw. 7. c. 46	Recorders, Stipendiary Magistrates, and Clerks of the Peace Act 1906	The whole act.
8 Edw. 7. c. 41	Assizes and Quarter Sessions Act 1908	The whole act.
1 & 2 Geo. 5. c. 6	Perjury Act 1911	In section 9(1) the words from " or any sheriff" to " executed " and the words from " at the proper court " to the end of the subsection.
1 & 2 Geo. 5. c. 6	Perjury Act 1911	Section 9(2).
3 & 4 Geo. 5. c. 32	Ancient Monuments Consolidation and Amendment Act 1913	Section 14(2).
4 & 5 Geo. 5. c. 59	Bankruptcy Act 1914	In section 140 the words from " or in the Court" to " Lancaster ".
5 & 6 Geo. 5. c. 90	Indictments Act 1915	Section 2(3),
5 & 6 Geo. 5. c. 90	Indictments Act 1915	In Schedule 1 paragraph 13(3).
10 & 11 Geo. 5. c. 81	Administration of Justice Act 1920	Section 3(2).
14 & 15 Geo. 5. c. 17	County Courts Act 1924	Section 3.
14 & 15 Geo. 5. c. 17	County Courts Act 1924	Section 5.
14 & 15 Geo. 5. c. 17	County Courts Act 1924	Section 11(2).
15 & 16 Geo. 5. c. 28	Administration of Justice Act 1925	Section 19.
15 & 16 Geo. 5. c. 49	Supreme Court of Judicature (Consolidation) Act 1925	In section 3(1) the words from " or any person " to " High Court" in the first place where those words occur and the proviso to that subsection.
15 & 16 Geo. 5. c. 49	Supreme Court of Judicature (Consolidation) Act 1925	Section 18(2)(a)(vii)
15 & 16 Geo. 5. c. 49	Supreme Court of Judicature (Consolidation) Act 1925	Section 25.
15 & 16 Geo. 5. c. 49	Supreme Court of Judicature (Consolidation) Act 1925	Section 52.
15 & 16 Geo. 5. c. 49	Supreme Court of Judicature (Consolidation) Act 1925	Section 70 t0 83.
15 & 16 Geo. 5. c. 49	Supreme Court of Judicature (Consolidation) Act 1925	In section 98(1) the words " other than a criminal proceeding by the Crown ".
15 & 16 Geo. 5. c. 49	Supreme Court of Judicature (Consolidation) Act 1925	Section 104(2).
15 & 16 Geo. 5. c. 49	Supreme Court of Judicature (Consolidation) Act 1925	Section 105(2).
15 & 16 Geo. 5. c. 49	Supreme Court of Judicature (Consolidation) Act 1925	Section 106.
15 & 16 Geo. 5. c. 49	Supreme Court of Judicature (Consolidation) Act 1925	Section 109 and 109A.
15 & 16 Geo. 5. c. 49	Supreme Court of Judicature (Consolidation) Act 1925	Section 111 to 114.
15 & 16 Geo. 5. c. 49	Supreme Court of Judicature (Consolidation) Act 1925	Section 115(3).
15 & 16 Geo. 5. c. 49	Supreme Court of Judicature (Consolidation) Act 1925	Section 116(4).
15 & 16 Geo. 5. c. 49	Supreme Court of Judicature (Consolidation) Act 1925	Section 118(2).
15 & 16 Geo. 5. c. 49	Supreme Court of Judicature (Consolidation) Act 1925	Section 119(1).
15 & 16 Geo. 5. c. 49	Supreme Court of Judicature (Consolidation) Act 1925	Section 123.
15 & 16 Geo. 5. c. 49	Supreme Court of Judicature (Consolidation) Act 1925	Section 125.
15 & 16 Geo. 5. c. 49	Supreme Court of Judicature (Consolidation) Act 1925	Section 130 to 132.
15 & 16 Geo. 5. c. 49	Supreme Court of Judicature (Consolidation) Act 1925	Section 201.
15 & 16 Geo. 5. c. 49	Supreme Court of Judicature (Consolidation) Act 1925	In section 213(1) the words "or in any court created by any commission ".
15 & 16 Geo. 5. c. 49	Supreme Court of Judicature (Consolidation) Act 1925	In section 225 the definitions of " clerk of assize ", " commission of assize ", " county ", " spring assizes " and " winter assizes ".
15 & 16 Geo. 5. c. 49	Supreme Court of Judicature (Consolidation) Act 1925	In Schedule 1 the entry relating to the Petty Bag Act 1849.
15 & 16 Geo. 5. c. 49	Supreme Court of Judicature (Consolidation) Act 1925	In Schedule 3, in Part I, the words " Official Referee to the Supreme Court".
15 & 16 Geo. 5. c. 49	Supreme Court of Judicature (Consolidation) Act 1925	In Schedule 4 the entry relating to an Official Referee and in column 2 of that Schedule paragraphs 2(ii) and 4(iii).
15 & 16 Geo. 5. c. 86	Criminal Justice Act 1925	In section 11 subsections (1), (2) and (4).
15 & 16 Geo. 5. c. 86	Criminal Justice Act 1925	Section 14.
15 & 16 Geo. 5. c. 86	Criminal Justice Act 1925	Section 20.
15 & 16 Geo. 5. c. 86	Criminal Justice Act 1925	Section 23.
15 & 16 Geo. 5. c. 86	Criminal Justice Act 1925	In section 41(2)(b) the word " recorder ".
15 & 16 Geo. 5. c. 86	Criminal Justice Act 1925	In section 49(2) the definition of quarter sessions.
16 & 17 Geo. 5. c. 59	Coroners (Amendment) Act 1926	In section 25(2) the words from " and such rules " to the end of the subsection.
18 & 19 Geo. 5. c. 26	Administration of Justice Act 1928	Sections 3 and 4.
18 & 19 Geo. 5. c. 26	Administration of Justice Act 1928	In Schedule 1, the amendments of sections 112 and 116 of the Judicature Act 1925.
19 & 20 Geo. 5. c. 17	Local Government Act 1929	In section 79(1) the words " or special juror ".
20 & 21 Geo. 5. c. 44	Land Drainage Act 1930	In section 30(4) the words from the beginning to " section, but".
20 & 21 Geo. 5. c. 51	Reservoirs (Safety Provisions) Act 1930	In section 5(1) the words " for the county or borough in which any part of the reservoir is situate ".
21 & 22 Geo. 5. c. 45	Local Government (Clerks) Act 1931	The whole act.
23 & 24 Geo. 5. c. 12	Children and Young Persons Act 1933	Section 56(2)(b).
23 & 24 Geo. 5. c. 36	Administration of Justice (Miscellaneous Provisions) Act 1933	Section 1.
23 & 24 Geo. 5. c. 36	Administration of Justice (Miscellaneous Provisions) Act 1933	In section 2, in subsection (1) the words " or chairman ", subsections (4) and (5) and in subsection (6) the words " or of a commissioner of assize ".
23 & 24 Geo. 5. c. 36	Administration of Justice (Miscellaneous Provisions) Act 1933	In Schedule 2. paragraph 2.
23 & 24 Geo. 5. c. 38	Summary Jurisdiction (Appeals) Act 1933	The whole act.
23 & 24 Geo. 5. c. 51	Local Government Act 1933	Section 59(3).
23 & 24 Geo. 5. c. 51	Local Government Act 1933	In section 98 the words from " but" to the end of the section.
23 & 24 Geo. 5. c. 51	Local Government Act 1933	In section 100 subsection (2) and in subsection (3) in paragraph (a) the words from " or if " to " either office ", proviso (i) and in proviso (ii) the words from the beginning to " of the county ", and in subsection (4) the words from " or, where" to " those offices ".
23 & 24 Geo. 5. c. 51	Local Government Act 1933	In section 148(1)(d) the words " court of quarter sessions ", " clerk of the peace" and the word " sessions ".
23 & 24 Geo. 5. c. 51	Local Government Act 1933	Section 242(2).
23 & 24 Geo. 5. c. 51	Local Government Act 1933	In section 275(3) the words " palatine court or ".
24 & 25 Geo. 5. c. 53	County Courts Act 1934	Section 9.
24 & 25 Geo. 5. c. 53	County Courts Act 1934	Section 29.
24 & 25 Geo. 5. c. 53	County Courts Act 1934	Part I of Schedule 1.
1 Edw. 8 & 1 Geo. 6. c. 68.	Local Government Superannuation Act 1937	Section 19.
1 Edw. 8 & 1 Geo. 6. c. 68.	Local Government Superannuation Act 1937	Part II of Schedule 2.
1 & 2 Geo. 6. c. 63.	Administration of Justice (Miscellaneous Provisions) Act 1938	Sections 1 to 5.
1 & 2 Geo. 6. c. 63.	Administration of Justice (Miscellaneous Provisions) Act 1938	In section 8 the words " or court of quarter sessions ",.
1 & 2 Geo. 6. c. 63.	Administration of Justice (Miscellaneous Provisions) Act 1938	Section 11.
1 & 2 Geo. 6. c. 63.	Administration of Justice (Miscellaneous Provisions) Act 1938	In Schedule 2 the amendments of sections 77 and 78 of the Judicature Act, of the Criminal Justice Act 1925 and of the local Acts for Middlesex and Hertfordshire.
1 & 2 Geo. 6. c. 67.	Supreme Court of Judicature (Amendment) Act 1938	In section 2 subsections (2) and (3).
9 & 10 Geo. 6. c. 78.	Supreme Court of Judicature (Circuit Officers) Act 1946	The whole act.
11 & 12 Geo. 6. c. 24.	Police Pensions Act 1948	Section 5(2)(3).
11 & 12 Geo. 6. c. 38.	Companies Act 1948	In section 270(9) the words following " Lord Chancellor " to " that court".
11 & 12 Geo. 6. c. 58.	Criminal Justice Act 1948	In section 8(3) paragraph (b) of the proviso.
11 & 12 Geo. 6. c. 58.	Criminal Justice Act 1948	Section 17(3)
11 & 12 Geo. 6. c. 58.	Criminal Justice Act 1948	Section 20(4).
11 & 12 Geo. 6. c. 58.	Criminal Justice Act 1948	In section 35(2) the words " chairman of quarter sessions, recorder" and subsection (3).
11 & 12 Geo. 6. c. 58.	Criminal Justice Act 1948	Section 37(5).
11 & 12 Geo. 6. c. 58.	Criminal Justice Act 1948	In Schedule 9 the amendments of the Diplomatic Privileges Act 1708, the Beerhouse Act 1840, the Queen's Remembrancer Act 1859, the Local Government Act 1888, the Criminal Appeal Act 1907, the Costs in Criminal Cases Act 1908, the Licensing (Consolidation) Act 1910, the Local Government (Clerks) Act 1931 and the Summary Jurisdiction (Appeals) Act 1933.
12, 13 & 14 Geo. 6. c. 51.	Legal Aid and Advice Act 1949	In Schedule 1 heads (e) to (k) of paragraph 1 and paragraph 5.
12, 13 & 14 Geo. 6. c. 68.	Representation of the People Act 1949	Section 45(6).
12, 13 & 14 Geo. 6. c. 68.	Representation of the People Act 1949	In section 111, subsections (1), (2), (4) and (7), and in subsection (3) the words " by the sheriff, mayor or other person ".
12, 13 & 14 Geo. 6. c. 68.	Representation of the People Act 1949	In section 163 in the definition of " public office " the words " clerk of the peace ".
12, 13 & 14 Geo. 6. c. 97.	National Parks and Access to the Countryside Act 1949	In section 31, in subsection (2) paragraphs (a) and (d), and in subsections (3), (4), (5) and (6) the words " or committee" wherever they occur, and subsection (7).
12, 13 & 14 Geo. 6. c. 101.	Justices of the Peace Act 1949	In section 8(4), as set out in Schedule 4 to the Justices of the Peace Act 1968, the words " or recorder " and the words from " and a paid " to the end of the subsection, and section 8(8)(a).
12, 13 & 14 Geo. 6. c. 101.	Justices of the Peace Act 1949	Section 10(5) except as respects Orders made before the coming into force of this repeal.
12, 13 & 14 Geo. 6. c. 101.	Justices of the Peace Act 1949	In section 13, in subsection (1) the words " as a court of quarter sessions or " and in subsection (4) the words " at quarter sessions or ".
12, 13 & 14 Geo. 6. c. 101.	Justices of the Peace Act 1949	In section 16, paragraph (b) of the proviso to subsection (2), subsection (5) from the words " so however " onwards and subsection (6)(a).
12, 13 & 14 Geo. 6. c. 101.	Justices of the Peace Act 1949	In section 20(6) the words " clerk of the peace ".
12, 13 & 14 Geo. 6. c. 101.	Justices of the Peace Act 1949	In section 27(2) the words from " otherwise " to " sessions ".
12, 13 & 14 Geo. 6. c. 101.	Justices of the Peace Act 1949	Sections 38 and 39.
12, 13 & 14 Geo. 6. c. 101.	Justices of the Peace Act 1949	In section 44(1) the definition of "court of quarter sessions ".
12, 13 & 14 Geo. 6. c. 101.	Justices of the Peace Act 1949	In Schedule 2—: in paragraph 11, in sub-paragraph (1) from the words " and the reference " to the end of the sub-paragraph, and in sub-paragraph (2) the words from " and in the case" to the end of the sub-paragraph, paragraphs 12 and 13, in paragraph 17, except as respects Orders made before the coming into force of this repeal, in sub-paragraph (1) the words " (including recorders)" and " court of quarter sessions or" (twice), and in sub-paragraph (2), in paragraph (a), the words "in or out of quarter sessions (including a recorder)" and paragraph (d).
12, 13 & 14 Geo. 6. c. 101.	Justices of the Peace Act 1949	In Schedule 4 paragraphs 1(3) and 4.
14 & 15 Geo. 6. c. 11.	Administration of Justice (Pensions) Act 1950	Section 22.
14 & 15 Geo. 6. c. 11.	Administration of Justice (Pensions) Act 1950	In Schedule 1 the entry beginning " Judge appointed for a district " and the entries relating to an Official Referee and to a Clerk of Assize.
14 & 15 Geo. 6. c. 11.	Administration of Justice (Pensions) Act 1950	In Schedule 2, in the amendment of the County Courts Act 1934, the words from " in Part I " to " fortieths ".
14 & 15 Geo. 6. c. 11.	Administration of Justice (Pensions) Act 1950	Schedule 4.
14 & 15 Geo. 6. c. 39.	Common Informers Act 1951	In the Schedule the entries relating to the Levy of Fines Act 1822, the Juries Act 1825 and the Summary Jurisdiction Act 1848.
14 & 15 Geo. 6. c. 65.	Reserve and Auxiliary Forces (Protection of Civil Interests) Act 1951	In section 48 the words " or clerk of the peace ".
14 & 15 Geo. 6. c. 65.	Reserve and Auxiliary Forces (Protection of Civil Interests) Act 1951	In Schedule 2, in Part I, the entry relating to clerk and deputy clerk of the peace, in Part II the two entries relating to clerk and deputy clerk of the peace.
15 & 16 Geo. 6. & 1 Eliz. 2. c. 52	Prison Act 1952	In section 6, subsection (1), in subsection (2) the words from " other than " to " section ", in subsection (3) the words " visiting committees and" and the words " visiting committee or ", and subsection (4).
15 & 16 Geo. 6. & 1 Eliz. 2. c. 52	Prison Act 1952	Section 20.
15 & 16 Geo. 6. & 1 Eliz. 2. c. 52	Prison Act 1952	In section 25(7) the words " but not for the purpose of subsection (2) thereof".
15 & 16 Geo. 6. & 1 Eliz. 2. c. 52	Prison Act 1952	In section 43(4)(a), the words " subsection (1) of section six ".
15 & 16 Geo. 6. & 1 Eliz. 2. c. 55	Magistrates' Courts Act 1952	Section 1(4).
15 & 16 Geo. 6. & 1 Eliz. 2. c. 55	Magistrates' Courts Act 1952	Sections 9 to 12.
15 & 16 Geo. 6. & 1 Eliz. 2. c. 55	Magistrates' Courts Act 1952	In section 19(3) the words " tell him before what court he would be tried if tried by a jury and ".
15 & 16 Geo. 6. & 1 Eliz. 2. c. 55	Magistrates' Courts Act 1952	In section 25(3) the words " tell him before what court he would be tried if tried by a jury and ".
15 & 16 Geo. 6. & 1 Eliz. 2. c. 55	Magistrates' Courts Act 1952	In section 34 the words " of assize or quarter sessions ".
15 & 16 Geo. 6. & 1 Eliz. 2. c. 55	Magistrates' Courts Act 1952	Section 84.
15 & 16 Geo. 6. & 1 Eliz. 2. c. 55	Magistrates' Courts Act 1952	Section 85(1).
15 & 16 Geo. 6. & 1 Eliz. 2. c. 55	Magistrates' Courts Act 1952	In section 126(1) the definition of " clerk of assize ".
15 & 16 Geo. 6. & 1 Eliz. 2. c. 55	Magistrates' Courts Act 1952	In section 129.
15 & 16 Geo. 6. & 1 Eliz. 2. c. 55	Magistrates' Courts Act 1952	In Schedule 2 paragraph 6.
15 & 16 Geo. 6. & 1 Eliz. 2. c. 55	Magistrates' Courts Act 1952	In Schedule 5, in the amendment of the Criminal Law Amendment Act 1867 the words " clerk of assize, clerk of the peace or other", and the amendments of the Assizes Relief Act 1889, the Summary Jurisdiction (Appeals) Act 1933 and sections 20 and 29 of the Criminal Justice Act 1948.
15 & 16 Geo. 6. & 1 Eliz. 2. c. 68	Cinematograph Act 1952	Section 6(2).
1 & 2 Eliz. 2. c. 25	Local Government Superannuation Act 1953	Section 24.
1 & 2 Eliz. 2. c. 25	Local Government Superannuation Act 1953	In Schedule 1, paragraph 11.
2 & 3 Eliz. 2. c. 27	Judges' Remuneration Act 1954	The whole act.
2 & 3 Eliz. 2. c. 38	Supreme Court Officers (Pensions) Act 1954	Section 1.
2 & 3 Eliz. 2. c. 38	Supreme Court Officers (Pensions) Act 1954	Section 3.
4 & 5 Eliz. 2. c. 34	Criminal Justice Administration Act 1956	Part I.
4 & 5 Eliz. 2. c. 34	Criminal Justice Administration Act 1956	Sections 13 to 15.
4 & 5 Eliz. 2. c. 34	Criminal Justice Administration Act 1956	Section 16(1)(a).
4 & 5 Eliz. 2. c. 34	Criminal Justice Administration Act 1956	In section 17, in subsection (1) the words from " nor" to the end of the subsection, and subsections (3) and (4).
4 & 5 Eliz. 2. c. 34	Criminal Justice Administration Act 1956	Sections 19 and 20.
4 & 5 Eliz. 2. c. 34	Criminal Justice Administration Act 1956	In section 21(2) the words from " except" to the end of the subsection.
4 & 5 Eliz. 2. c. 34	Criminal Justice Administration Act 1956	Schedule 1.
4 & 5 Eliz. 2. c. 46	Administration of Justice Act 1956	Sections 9 and 10.
4 & 5 Eliz. 2. c. 46	Administration of Justice Act 1956	In section 25(1) the words from the beginning to " accordingly ".
4 & 5 Eliz. 2. c. 46	Administration of Justice Act 1956	Section 52.
4 & 5 Eliz. 2. c. 69	Sexual Offences Act 1956	In section 37(2) the words " if an indictment is not triable by a court of quarter sessions ".
4 & 5 Eliz. 2. c. 69	Sexual Offences Act 1956	In Schedule 2, in column 2, the words " not triable at quarter sessions" wherever they occur, and in paragraph 16 the words from " triable " to " not otherwise " (twice).
5 & 6 Eliz. 2. c. 20	House of Commons Disqualification Act 1957	In Schedule 1, in Part I, all the entries from the first entry beginning " Commissioner " to the entry beginning " Judge of a County Court" except the entries relating to—: Judge of the Courts-Martial Appeal Court, and; Chairman of the Scottish Lands Court; the six entries beginning with that relating to the Presiding Judge of the Liverpool Court of Passage and ending with the last entry beginning with the words " Whole-time salaried"; and the entry " Official Referee to the Supreme Court".
5 & 6 Eliz. 2. c. 20	House of Commons Disqualification Act 1957	In Schedule 1, in Part III, the entry " Clerk of Assize" and the entry " Registrar of any district of the Court of Chancery of the County Palatine of Lancaster ".
5 & 6 Eliz. 2. c. 20	House of Commons Disqualification Act 1957	In Schedule 1, in Part IV the entries relating to a recorder and to a chairman or deputy chairman of a court of quarter sessions.
5 & 6 Eliz. 2. c. 20	House of Commons Disqualification Act 1957	In Schedule 3, in Part III of Schedule 1 as there set out the words " Clerk of Assize ".
5 & 6 Eliz. 2. c. 27	Solicitors Act 1957	In section 18(1) the words " any court of assize, any general or quarter sessions ".
5 & 6 Eliz. 2. c. 27	Solicitors Act 1957	In section 29(5) in the definition of " county office " the words " clerk or deputy clerk of the peace of a county ", the words " the court of quarter sessions or by " and the words " or by a joint committee of the court of quarter sessions and the county council".
5 & 6 Eliz. 2. c. 46	Judicial Offices (Salaries and Pensions) Act 1957	In section 1, subsection (1)(a), in subsection (2) the words " to a recorder" and subsection (6).
5 & 6 Eliz. 2. c. 46	Judicial Offices (Salaries and Pensions) Act 1957	Section 2.
5 & 6 Eliz. 2. c. 46	Judicial Offices (Salaries and Pensions) Act 1957	Schedule 1.
5 & 6 Eliz. 2. c. 52	Geneva Conventions Act 1957	In section 1(3) the words " Neither a court of quarter sessions ".
5 & 6 Eliz. 2. c. 56	Housing Act 1957	Section 14(6)(7).
6 & 7 Eliz. 2. c. 55	Local Government Act 1958	In section 38(2) the words " and a court of quarter sessions ".
7 & 8 Eliz, 2. c. 5.	Adoption Act 1958	Section 31(5).;
7 & 8 Eliz. 2. c. 22	County Courts Act 1959	In section 2(2), the proviso.
7 & 8 Eliz. 2. c. 22	County Courts Act 1959	Sections 3 to 10.
7 & 8 Eliz. 2. c. 22	County Courts Act 1959	Sections 12 to 17.
7 & 8 Eliz. 2. c. 22	County Courts Act 1959	Section 28.
7 & 8 Eliz. 2. c. 22	County Courts Act 1959	Section 33.
7 & 8 Eliz. 2. c. 22	County Courts Act 1959	In section 34(1) the words from " so however " to the end of the subsection.
7 & 8 Eliz. 2. c. 22	County Courts Act 1959	In Schedule 2, paragraph 2(1).
7 & 8 Eliz. 2. c. 25	Highways Act 1959	In section 60, subsections (1), (3), (4) and (5).
7 & 8 Eliz. 2. c. 25	Highways Act 1959	Section 275(3).
7 & 8 Eliz. 2. c. 25	Highways Act 1959	In section 276, in subsection (1) the words from " the appeal" to the end of the subsection, and subsections (4), (7), (8) and (9).
7 & 8 Eliz. 2. c. 72	Mental Health Act 1959	Section 67(2).
7 & 8 Eliz. 2. c. 72	Mental Health Act 1959	Section 68(3).
7 & 8 Eliz. 2. c. 72	Mental Health Act 1959	Section 70(4).
7 & 8 Eliz. 2. c. 72	Mental Health Act 1959	Section 115(3).
10 & 11 Eliz. 2. c. 15	Criminal Justice Administration Act 1962	Section 2.
10 & 11 Eliz. 2. c. 15	Criminal Justice Administration Act 1962	In section 3 subsections (3) and (5).
10 & 11 Eliz. 2. c. 15	Criminal Justice Administration Act 1962	Sections 4 to 10.
10 & 11 Eliz. 2. c. 15	Criminal Justice Administration Act 1962	Sections 14 to 18.
10 & 11 Eliz. 2. c. 15	Criminal Justice Administration Act 1962	Section 21(3).
10 & 11 Eliz. 2. c. 15	Criminal Justice Administration Act 1962	Schedule 4 except for the amendments (in Part I) of the South Staffordshire Stipendiary Justices Act 1899 and (in Part II) of section 24 of the Magistrates' Courts Act 1952.
1963 c. 2.	Betting, Gaming and Lotteries Act 1963	In Schedule 2, in paragraph 6, the words from " in accordance " to " 1849 ".
1963 c. 2.	Betting, Gaming and Lotteries Act 1963	In Schedule 3, in paragraph 13(2), the words from " in accordance " to " 1849 ".
1963 c. 2.	Betting, Gaming and Lotteries Act 1963	In Schedule 7, in paragraph 5, the words from " in accordance " to " 1849 ".
1963 c. 33.	London Government Act 1963	In Schedule 6 paragraph 20.
1963 c. 37.	Children and Young Persons Act 1963	Section 19.
1963 c. 37.	Children and Young Persons Act 1963	In Schedule 3 paragraphs 28 and 51.
1964 c. 26.	Licensing Act 1964	Section 21(3).
1964 c. 26.	Licensing Act 1964	Subsections (1) and (2) of section 23.
1964 c. 26.	Licensing Act 1964	In section 38(e) the words " for the constitution, where requisite, of committees of quarter sessions as standing committees, and ".
1964 c. 26.	Licensing Act 1964	Section 154(2).
1964 c. 26.	Licensing Act 1964	In Schedule 11, in paragraph 14, the words from the beginning to " be ".
1964 c. 42.	Administration of Justice Act 1964	Section 1.
1964 c. 42.	Administration of Justice Act 1964	In section 2, in subsection (3) the words " quarter sessions " and " the clerk of the peace ", and in subsection (4) the words from " and accordingly " to the end of the subsection.
1964 c. 42.	Administration of Justice Act 1964	Sections 4 to 8.
1964 c. 42.	Administration of Justice Act 1964	Section 10(5)(a).
1964 c. 42.	Administration of Justice Act 1964	In section 13(2) the words " the chairman of the court of quarter sessions and " and the word " each ".
1964 c. 42.	Administration of Justice Act 1964	Section 23.
1964 c. 42.	Administration of Justice Act 1964	In section 25, subsection (1), in subsection (2) the words " commissions of assize and ", " quarter sessions" and " clerks of the peace " and subsections (3) and (4).
1964 c. 42.	Administration of Justice Act 1964	In section 26 the words " quarter sessions ".
1964 c. 42.	Administration of Justice Act 1964	In section 28, in subsection (2)(a) the words " or clerk of the peace ", subsection (2)(b) and in subsection (3) the words from "and 'clerk of the peace '"to the end of the subsection.
1964 c. 42.	Administration of Justice Act 1964	Section 29.
1964 c. 42.	Administration of Justice Act 1964	Sections 34 and 35.
1964 c. 42.	Administration of Justice Act 1964	Schedules 1 and 2.
1964 c. 42.	Administration of Justice Act 1964	In Schedule 3 paragraphs 11, 14. 17. 22(1)(2). 23(1) and 28.
1964 c. 42.	Administration of Justice Act 1964	Schedule 4.
1964 c. 84.	Criminal Procedure (Insanity) Act 1964	In section 5(4), the words from " at the next " to " have been tried ".
1964 c. iv.	City of London (Courts) Act 1964	Sections 4 to 6.
1964 c. iv.	City of London (Courts) Act 1964	Section 8.
1964 c. iv.	City of London (Courts) Act 1964	Sections 9 to 11.
1964 c. iv.	City of London (Courts) Act 1964	Sections 13 and 14.
1964 c. iv.	City of London (Courts) Act 1964	In section 15 the words and the assistant judge of the court", the words " and the assistant judge" and the " proviso.
1964 c. iv.	City of London (Courts) Act 1964	Sections 16 to 21.
1965 c. 66.	Hire-Purchase Act 1965	Section 50.
1965 c. 69.	Criminal Procedure (Attendance of Witnesses) Act 1965	Section 3(3).
1965 c. 69.	Criminal Procedure (Attendance of Witnesses) Act 1965	Sections 5 and 6.
1965 c. 69.	Criminal Procedure (Attendance of Witnesses) Act 1965	Section 7(1).
1965 c. 69.	Criminal Procedure (Attendance of Witnesses) Act 1965	In Schedule 1, in paragraph 1 the words following " rules of court", in paragraph 2 the words " or, as the case may be, standing orders" and sub-paragraph (c).
1965 c. 69.	Criminal Procedure (Attendance of Witnesses) Act 1965	In Schedule 2, the amendments of the Quarter Sessions Act 1842, and of the Assizes Relief Act 1889.
1966 c. 31.	Criminal Appeal Act 1966	In section 1(3) the words " of the Queen's Bench Division " and paragraph (a).
1966 c. 31.	Criminal Appeal Act 1966	Section 3(1).
1966 c. 31.	Criminal Appeal Act 1966	In Schedule 2 paragraph 5.
1967 c. 9.	General Rate Act 1967	In section 7(1) the words " in accordance with the Quarter Sessions Act 1849 " and the words " having jurisdiction in the rating district concerned ".
1967 c. 9.	General Rate Act 1967	In section 99(5) the words lor the area where the rate was made ".
1967 c. 19.	Private Places of Entertainment (Licensing) Act 1967	In section 5(4) the words from " and section 31 " to the end of the subsection.
1967 c. 28.	Superannuation (Miscellaneous Provisions) Act 1967	In section 3(4) in paragraph (a), in sub-paragraph (iii) the words " 9 or" and sub-paragraphs (vii) and (viii).
1967 c. 56.	Matrimonial Causes Act 1967	In section 2(2) the words from " and may so provide " to the end of the subsection.
1967 c. 58.	Criminal Law Act 1967	Section 8.
1967 c. 58.	Criminal Law Act 1967	Schedule 1.
1967 c. 58.	Criminal Law Act 1967	In Schedule 2, paragraph 1 and paragraph 15(2).
1967 c. 80.	Criminal Justice Act 1967	In section 22(4) the words " a court of quarter sessions ".
1967 c. 80.	Criminal Justice Act 1967	In section 41, in subsection (1) the words " before which he appears or is brought " in the first place where they occur, in subsection (2) the words " having power to deal with him in respect of the suspended sentence " and subsection (3).
1967 c. 80.	Criminal Justice Act 1967	In section 42(5) the words from " but if a warrant" to the end of the subsection.
1967 c. 80.	Criminal Justice Act 1967	In section 47, subsection (5), and in subsection (7) the words " and the clerk of the court".
1967 c. 80.	Criminal Justice Act 1967	Section 54(4).
1967 c. 80.	Criminal Justice Act 1967	Section 56(7).
1967 c. 80.	Criminal Justice Act 1967	In section 76(4), in paragraph (b) the words from " or any other court " to " 1962 " and in paragraph (c) the words from " or any other court" to " section 16 ".
1967 c. 80.	Criminal Justice Act 1967	In section 95, subsections (4) and (5).
1967 c. 80.	Criminal Justice Act 1967	In section 104(1) the definition of " the clerk of the court".
1968 c. 5.	Administration of Justice Act 1968	Section 1(1)(b)(iii).
1968 c. 19.	Criminal Appeal Act 1968	In section 8(1), the words from " and shall be tried " to the end of the subsection.
1968 c. 19.	Criminal Appeal Act 1968	In section 24(2) the words from " and the reference " to the end of the subsection.
1968 c. 19.	Criminal Appeal Act 1968	In section 39(3) the words from " and the reference " to the end of the subsection.
1968 c. 19.	Criminal Appeal Act 1968	In Schedule 5 the amendment of the Children and Young Persons Act 1933.
1968 c. 27.	Firearms Act 1968	Section 44(2)(a).
1968 c. 27.	Firearms Act 1968	In Schedule 3, in Part I, paragraph 1.
1968 c. 27.	Firearms Act 1968	In Schedule 5, in Part I, the whole of the second column.
1968 c. 60.	Theft Act 1968	Section 29(1).
1968 c. 60.	Theft Act 1968	In Schedule 2, in Part III, the amendment of the Criminal Law Act 1967.
1968 c. 63.	Domestic and Appellate Proceedings (Restriction of Publicity) Act 1968	In section 1(4), the words " the Chancery Court of a County Palatine " and the words from "the Crown Court at Liverpool " to " quarter sessions ".
1968 c. 69.	Justices of the Peace Act 1968	Section 1(8)(b).
1968 c. 69.	Justices of the Peace Act 1968	In Schedule 1, all except the entries (in all three columns) for stipendiary magistrates and the Commissioners and Assistant Commissioners of Police of the Metropolis.
1968 c. 69.	Justices of the Peace Act 1968	In Schedule 3, paragraph 2(2), in paragraph 3, the words " quarter sessions " and " the clerk of the peace ", in paragraph 4, sub-paragraphs (1), (2) and (3) and paragraph 7.
1969 c. 54.	Children and Young Persons Act 1969	Section 3(9).
1969 c. 58.	Administration of Justice Act 1969	In section 12 subsection (2)(b) and in subsection (8) the words " or commissioner" and " or paragraph (b) ".
1969 c. 58.	Administration of Justice Act 1969	Section 25(1)(a).
1969 c. 58.	Administration of Justice Act 1969	Section 26(1).
1970 c. 31.	Administration of Justice Act 1970	Sections 7 and 8.
1970 c. 31.	Administration of Justice Act 1970	Section 45(1).
1970 c. 31.	Administration of Justice Act 1970	In Schedule 2, in paragraph 6 the amendments of sections 70, 109, 113, 115 and 116 of the Judicature Act 1925, and paragraph 10.
1970 c. 31.	Administration of Justice Act 1970	In Schedule 9, paragraphs 8 and 21.
