= Costs in Criminal Cases Act 1973 =

Act of the Parliament of the United Kingdom

Costs in Criminal Cases Act 1973 (Note: Section 22(1).)
- Act of Parliament
- Parliament of the United Kingdom
- Long title: An Act to consolidate certain enactments relating to costs in criminal cases.
- Citation: 1973 c. 14
- Territorial extent: England and Wales (Note: Section 22(3).)

Dates
- Royal assent: 18 April 1973
- Commencement: 18 July 1973 (Note: Section 22(2).)
- Repealed: 1 October 1986
Other legislation
Amends	See § Repealed enactments
Repeals/revokes	See § Repealed enactments
Amended by	Solicitors Act 1974; Administration of Justice Act 1977; Interpretation Act 1978; Magistrates' Courts Act 1980; Senior Courts Act 1981
Repealed by	Prosecution of Offences Act 1985

Status: Repealed

Text of statute as originally enacted

The Costs in Criminal Cases Act 1973 (c. 14) was an act of the Parliament of the United Kingdom that consolidated enactments relating to costs in criminal cases in England and Wales.

== Provisions ==
=== Repealed enactments ===
Section 21(2) of the act repealed 8 enactments, listed in the second schedule to the act.

Citation	Short title	Extent of repeal
15 & 16 Geo. 6 & 1 Eliz. 2. c. 48	Costs in Criminal Cases Act 1952	The whole act.
15 & 16 Geo. 6 & 1 Eliz. 2. c. 55	Magistrates' Courts Act 1952	In Schedule 5, the entry relating to the Costs in Criminal Cases Act 1952.
7 & 8 Eliz. 2. c. 72	Mental Health Act 1959	In Part I of Schedule 7, the entry relating to the Costs in Criminal Cases Act 1952.
1967 c. 80	Criminal Justice Act 1967	Section 31(1) and (2).
1968 c. 19	Criminal Appeal Act 1968	In section 32(2), the words preceding the words "section 33", and the words from "and section 47" to "Crown Court out of central funds)". Section 32(4). Sections 24 to 28. Section 31(2)(g). Sections 39 to 41. Section 44(d). In Schedule 5, the entries relating to sections 12 and 17(2) of the Costs in Criminal Cases Act 1952. In Schedule 9, paragraph 5.
1970 c. 31	Administration of Justice Act 1970	Sections 47 to 49. Section 51(1). In section 51(2), the words "the Costs in Criminal Cases Act 1952 and other". Section 52(1) and (2). In section 52(3), paragraph (a) and the words from "by the prosecutor" to "may be".
1971 c. 23	Courts Act 1971	In section 52(5), the words from "Subsections (1)" to "1952; and". In Schedule 6— paragraphs 1 to 5; paragraph 8; in paragraph 9(1), the words from "Section 5" to "appeals out of central funds)," and the words from "and after" onwards; paragraph 9(2); paragraph 11. In Schedule 9, the entry relating to the Costs in Criminal Cases Act 1952.
1972 c. 71	Criminal Justice Act 1972	Section 39. Schedule 3. In Schedule 5, the amendments of the Costs in Criminal Cases Act 1952, and the amendment of paragraph 9 of Schedule 9 to the Administration of Justice Act 1970.

== Subsequent developments ==
The whole act was repealed by section 31(6) of, and schedule 2 to, the Prosecution of Offences Act 1985, which came into force on 1 October 1986.
