= Crown Debts Act 1541 =

Act of the Parliament of England

Crown Debts Act 1541 (Note: The citation of this act by this short title was authorised by section 5 of, and the second schedule to, the Statute Law Revision Act 1948. Due to the repeal of those provisions, it is now authorised by section 19(2) of the Interpretation Act 1978.)
- Act of Parliament
- Parliament of England
- Long title: The Byll for thestablishment of the Courte of Surveyors. (Note: These words are printed against this act in the second column of the second schedule to the Statute Law Revision Act 1948, which is headed "Title".)
- Citation: 33 Hen. 8. c. 39
- Territorial extent: England and Wales

Dates
- Royal assent: 1 April 1542
- Commencement: 16 January 1542 (Note: Start of session.)
- Repealed: 1 January 1982

Other legislation
- Repeals/revokes: Surveyors of Crown Lands, etc. Act 1523
- Amended by: Statute Law Revision Act 1863; Statute Law Revision Act 1863; Administration of Justice (Miscellaneous Provisions) Act 1933; Courts Act 1971
- Repealed by: Supreme Court Act 1981
- Relates to: Exchequer Court (Scotland) Act 1707

Status: Repealed

Text of statute as originally enacted

The Crown Debts Act 1541 (33 Hen. 8. c. 39) was an act of the Parliament of England, which introduced the concept of crown debt in English law, i.e. that the crown has priority for its debts before all other creditors.

== Provisions ==
Section 30 of the act repealed the Surveyors of Crown Lands, etc. Act 1523 (14 & 15 Hen. 8. c. 15).

== Subsequent developments ==
Sections 1-35 and 38 of the act were repealed by section 1 of, and the schedule to, the Statute Law Revision Act 1863 (26 & 27 Vict. c. 125), which came into force on 28 July 1863.

The whole act was repealed by section 152(4) of, and schedule 7 to, the Senior Courts Act 1981, which came into force on 1 January 1982.
