= Administration of Justice (Miscellaneous Provisions) Act 1933 =

Act of the Parliament of the United Kingdom

Administration of Justice (Miscellaneous Provisions) Act 1933 (Note: Section 10(1).)
- Act of Parliament
- Parliament of the United Kingdom
- Long title: An Act to abolish grand juries and amend the law as to the presentment of indictments; to provide for the summary determination of questions as to liability for death duties; to make provision for alternative procedure for the recovery of Crown debts and to enable proceedings by the Crown to be instituted in county courts in appropriate cases; to amend the procedure as to certain prerogative writs and as to trials by jury in the High Court; to amend the law as to the payment of costs by and to the Crown; to provide for the further delegation of the jurisdiction of the Master in Lunacy; and for purposes connected with the matters aforesaid.
- Citation: 23 & 24 Geo. 5. c. 36
- Territorial extent: England and Wales (Note: Section 10(2).)

Dates
- Royal assent: 28 July 1933
- Commencement: 1 September 1933 (Note: Section 10(4).)

Other legislation
- Amends: See § Repealed enactments
- Repeals/revokes: See § Repealed enactments
- Amended by: County Courts Act 1934; Administration of Justice (Miscellaneous Provisions) Act 1938; Parliament (Elections and Meeting) Act 1943; Crown Proceedings Act 1947; Statute Law Revision Act 1950; Costs in Criminal Cases Act 1952; Statute Law Revision Act 1953; Mental Health Act 1959; Criminal Appeal Act 1964; Criminal Appeal Act 1966; Criminal Law Act 1967; Law Reform (Miscellaneous Provisions) Act 1970; Courts Act 1971; Finance Act 1975; Senior Courts Act 1981; Prosecution of Offences Act 1985; Statute Law (Repeals) Act 1986; Criminal Justice Act 1991; Statute Law (Repeals) Act 1993; Crime and Disorder Act 1998; Criminal Justice Act 2003; Coroners and Justice Act 2009; Crime and Courts Act 2013; Deregulation Act 2015

Status: Partially repealed

Text of statute as originally enacted

Revised text of statute as amended

Text of the Administration of Justice (Miscellaneous Provisions) Act 1933 as in force today (including any amendments) within the United Kingdom, from legislation.gov.uk.

The Administration of Justice (Miscellaneous Provisions) Act 1933 (23 & 24 Geo. 5. c. 36) is an act of the Parliament of the United Kingdom that abolished grand juries and amended the law relating to the presentment of indictments, Crown proceedings, prerogative writs, jury trials, and costs in England and Wales.

== Provisions ==
=== Repealed enactments ===
Section 10(3) of the act repealed 38 enactments, listed in the third schedule to the act.

Citation	Short title		Extent of repeal
33 Hen. 8. c. 39	Crown Debts Act 1541	The Byll for the stablishment of the Courte of Surveyors	In section thirty-six, the word "costs".
38 Geo. 3. c. 52	Counties of Cities Act 1798	The Counties of Cities Act, 1798	In section five, the words "before the grand jury and".
16 & 17 Vict. c. 51	Succession Duty Act 1853	The Succession Duty Act, 1853	In section fifty, the words "and the costs thereof".
18 & 19 Vict. c. 90	Crown Suits Act 1855	The Crown Suits Act, 1855	The whole act.
22 & 23 Vict. c. 17	Vexatious Indictments Act 1859	The Vexatious Indictments Act, 1859	The whole act.
22 & 23 Vict. c. 21	Queen's Remembrancer Act 1859	The Queen's Remembrancer Act, 1859	Section twenty-one.
27 & 28 Vict. c. 57	Admiralty Lands and Works Act 1864	The Admiralty Lands and Works Act, 1864	In section eleven, the words from "and in any such action" to the end of the section.
28 & 29 Vict. c. 104	Crown Suits Act 1865	The Crown Suits Act, 1865	In section fifty-eight, the words "and for costs"; and in section fifty-nine, the words "and may award costs".
28 & 29 Vict. c. 124	Admiralty Powers &c. Act 1865	The Admiralty Powers &c. Act, 1865	In section two, the words from "and in any action" to the end of the section.
30 & 31 Vict. c. 35	Criminal Law Amendment Act 1867	The Criminal Law Amendment Act, 1867	Section one.
31 & 32 Vict. c. 78	Admiralty Suits Act 1868	The Admiralty Suits Act, 1868	Section five.
31 & 32 Vict. c. 110	Telegraph Act 1868	The Telegraph Act, 1868	In section six, the words "to pay costs and".
32 & 33 Vict. c. 62	Debtors Act 1869	The Debtors Act, 1869	In section eighteen, the words "shall be deemed to be an offence within and subject to the provisions of the Vexatious Indictments Act, 1859".
40 & 41 Vict. c. 13	Customs, Inland Revenue, and Savings Banks Act 1877	The Customs and Inland Revenue and Savings Bank Act, 18	Section five, so far as it relates to civil proceedings by the Crown.
43 & 44 Vict. c. 19	Taxes Management Act 1880	The Taxes Management Act, 1880	In paragraph (6) of subsection (2) of section fifty-nine, the words "and may make such order as to costs".
44 & 45 Vict. c. 60	Newspaper Libel and Registration Act 1881	The Newspaper Libel and Registration Act, 1881	Section six.
45 & 46 Vict. c. 50	Municipal Corporations Act 1882	The Municipal Corporations Act, 1882	In subsection (2) of section one hundred and eighty-six, the words from "and shall" to the end of the subsection.
48 & 49 Vict. c. 69	Criminal Law Amendment Act 1885	The Criminal Law Amendment Act, 1885	In section seventeen, the words from the beginning to "amending the same and".
50 & 51 Vict. c. 28	Merchandise Marks Act 1887	The Merchandise Marks Act, 1887	Section thirteen.
52 & 53 Vict. c. 49	Arbitration Act 1889	The Arbitration Act, 1889	In section twenty-three, the words "or shall affect the law as to costs payable by the Crown".
54 & 55 Vict. c. 39	Stamp Act 1891	The Stamp Act, 1891	In subsection (4) of section thirteen, the words "with or without costs as the court may determine," and subsection (5) of the same section.
57 & 58 Vict. c. 30	Finance Act 1894	The Finance Act, 1894	In subsection (3) of section ten, the words "the costs of the appeal shall be in the discretion of the court and".
6 Edw. 7. c. 34	Prevention of Corruption Act 1906	The Prevention of Corruption Act, 1906	Subsection (2) of section two.
8 Edw. 7. c. 15	Costs in Criminal Cases Act 1908	The Costs in Criminal Cases Act, 1908	In subsection (2) of section six, the words "presented to a grand jury under the Vexatious Indictments Act, 1859"; and subsection (2) of section nine.
8 Edw. 7. c. 41	Assizes and Quarter Sessions Act 1908	The Assizes and Quarter Sessions Act, 1908	In subsection (5) of section one, the words "to a grand jury".
8 Edw. 7. c. 45	Punishment of Incest Act 1908	The Punishment of Incest Act, 1908	Subsection (1) of section four.
1 & 2 Geo. 5. c. 6	Perjury Act 1911	The Perjury Act, 1911	Section eleven.
4 & 5 Geo. 5. c. 59	Bankruptcy Act 1914	The Bankruptcy Act, 1914	In subsection (3) of section one hundred and sixty-four, the words from "shall be deemed" to "that Act".
5 & 6 Geo. 5. c. 90	Indictments Act 1915	The Indictments Act, 1915	In section seven, the words "the Vexatious Indictments Act, 1859, as amended by section one of the Criminal Law Amendment Act, 1867, or" and the proviso.
8 & 9 Geo. 5. c. 40	Income Tax Act 1918	The Income Tax Act, 1918	In subsection (2)(a) of section one hundred and forty-nine, the words "and may make such order as to costs"; and in section one hundred and sixty-nine, the words "with full costs of suit".
9 & 10 Geo. 5. c. 50	Ministry of Transport Act 1919	The Ministry of Transport Act, 1919	In subsection (1) of section twenty-six, the words "and costs may be awarded to or against the Minister".
10 & 11 Geo. 5. c. 81	Administration of Justice Act 1920	The Administration of Justice Act, 1920	In subsection (1) of section four, the words from "and the grand jury" to the end of the subsection.
12 & 13 Geo. 5. c. 11	Juries Act 1922	The Juries Act, 1922	In subsection (1) of section four, the words "on grand juries in the borough and".
12 & 13 Geo. 5. c. 60	Lunacy Act 1922	The Lunacy Act, 1922	In subsection (2) of section one, the words "as regards administration and management".
15 & 16 Geo. 5. c. 49	Supreme Court of Judicature (Consolidation) Act 1925	The Supreme Court of Judicature (Consolidation) Act, 1925	In subsection (5) of section seventy-eight, the words "to a grand jury".
15 & 16 Geo. 5. c. 72	Honours (Prevention of Abuses) Act 1925	The Honours (Prevention of Abuses) Act, 1925	Subsection (4) of section one.
15 & 16 Geo. 5. c. 86	Criminal Justice Act 1925	The Criminal Justice Act, 1925	Subsection (4) of section thirteen; section nineteen; and in subsection (1) of section thirty-three, the words "to the grand jury".
23 & 24 Geo. 5. c. 12	Children and Young Persons Act 1933	The Children and Young Persons Act, 1933	Section sixteen.

== Subsequent developments ==
Section 5 of the act was repealed by section 20(3) of, and the fourth schedule to, the Administration of Justice (Miscellaneous Provisions) Act 1938 (1 & 2 Geo. 6. c. 63), which came into force on 1 January 1939.

Section 4 of the act was repealed by section 39(1) of, and the second schedule to, the Crown Proceedings Act 1947 (10 & 11 Geo. 6. c. 44), which came into force on 1 January 1948.

Section 8 of the act was repealed by section 149(2) of, and part I of the eighth schedule to, the Mental Health Act 1959 (7 & 8 Eliz. 2. c. 72), which came into force on 1 November 1960.

Schedule 1 to the act was repealed by section 10(2) of, and part II of schedule 3 to, the Criminal Law Act 1967, which came into force on 1 January 1968.

Section 1 of the act was repealed by section 56(4) of, and part IV of schedule 11 to, the Courts Act 1971 (c. 23), which came into force on 1 January 1972.

Section 3 of the act was repealed by section 52(2) of, and part I of schedule 13 to, the Finance Act 1975, which came into force on 13 March 1975.

Section 6 of the act was repealed by section 152(4) of, and schedule 7 to, the Senior Courts Act 1981, which came into force on 1 January 1982.

Sections 2 and 7 of the act remain in force. Section 2, which established the procedure for the preferment of bills of indictment following the abolition of grand juries, has been significantly amended by the Criminal Justice Act 2003 and the Deregulation Act 2015.
