= Crown debt =

Crown debt, in English law, is a debt due to the crown.

By various statutes, the first being the Crown Debts Act 1541 (33 Hen. 8. c. 39), dating from the reign of Henry VIII of England, the Crown has priority for its debts before all other creditors. At common law the Crown always had a lien on the lands and goods of debtors by record, which could be enforced even when they had passed into the hands of other persons. The difficulty of ascertaining whether lands were subject to a Crown lien or not was often very great, and remedies were provided by the Judgments Act 1839 and then the Crown Suits Act 1865.

Under the Land Charges Act 1900, no debt due to the Crown operates as a charge on land until a writ of execution for the purpose of enforcing it has been registered under the Land Charges Registration and Searches Act 1888.

By the Crown Debts Act 1541, specialty debts were put practically on the same footing as debts by record. Simple contract debts due to the Crown also become specialty debts, and the rights of the Crown are enforced by a summary process called an extent.

In modern usage the term encompasses the various charges and taxes made by the Government of the United Kingdom, including VAT and PAYE.
