= Prosecution of Offences Act 1985 =

Act of the Parliament of the United Kingdom

Prosecution of Offences Act 1985 (Note: Section 31(1).)
- Act of Parliament
- Parliament of the United Kingdom
- Long title: An Act to provide for the establishment of a Crown Prosecution Service for England and Wales; to make provision as to costs in criminal cases; to provide for the imposition of time limits in relation to preliminary stages of criminal proceedings; to amend section 42 of the Supreme Court Act 1981 and section 3 of the Children and Young Persons Act 1969; to make provision with respect to consents to prosecutions; to repeal section 9 of the Perjury Act 1911; and for connected purposes.
- Citation: 1985 c. 23
- Territorial extent: England and Wales (Note: Section 31(7).)

Dates
- Royal assent: 23 May 1985
- Commencement: various (Note: Section 31(2)–(4).)
Other legislation
Amends	Administration of Justice (Miscellaneous Provisions) Act 1933; Bail Act 1976; Senior Courts Act 1981
Repeals/revokes	Costs in Criminal Cases Act 1973
Amended by	Criminal Justice Act 1987; Criminal Justice Act 1988; Legal Aid Act 1988; Criminal Justice and Public Order Act 1994; Crime and Disorder Act 1998; Immigration and Asylum Act 1999; Asylum and Immigration (Treatment of Claimants, etc.) Act 2004; Domestic Violence, Crime and Victims Act 2004; Violent Crime Reduction Act 2006; Criminal Justice and Immigration Act 2008; Statute Law (Repeals) Act 2008; Criminal Justice and Courts Act 2015; Offensive Weapons Act 2019; Sentencing Act 2020; Public Order Act 2023; Victims and Courts Act 2026

Status: Amended

Text of statute as originally enacted

Revised text of statute as amended

Text of the Prosecution of Offences Act 1985 as in force today (including any amendments) within the United Kingdom, from legislation.gov.uk.

The Prosecution of Offences Act 1985 (c. 23) is an act of the Parliament of the United Kingdom. Its main provisions are to establish the Crown Prosecution Service (CPS), to transfer the responsibility of prosecution of offences from the police to the CPS, and to codify the prosecution process.
