= Exchequer Court (Scotland) Act 1707 =

Act of the Parliament of Great Britain

Exchequer Court (Scotland) Act 1707 (Note: The citation of this act by this short title was authorised by section 1 of, and the first schedule to, the Short Titles Act 1896. Due to the repeal of those provisions it is now authorised by section 19(2) of the Interpretation Act 1978.)
- Act of Parliament
- Parliament of Great Britain
- Long title: An Act for settling and establishing a Court of Exchequer in Scotland.
- Citation: 6 Ann. c. 53 (Note: This is the citation in The Statutes of the Realm); 6 Ann. c. 26 (Note: This is the citation in The Statutes at Large)
- Territorial extent: Great Britain

Dates
- Royal assent: 1 April 1708
- Commencement: 1 May 1708 (Note: Section 1.)

Other legislation
- Amends: Customs and Excise Revenues Audit (Scotland) Act 1832; Exchequer Court (Scotland) Act 1856; Short Titles Act 1896; Supreme Court of Judicature (Consolidation) Act 1925; Statute Law Revision Act 1948; The Transfer of Functions (Treasury and Secretary of State) Order 1974
- Amended by: Statute Law Revision Act 1878; Statute Law Revision Act 1888; Statute Law Revision Act 1948
- Relates to: Crown Debts Act 1541; Union with Scotland Act 1706

Status: Amended

Text of statute as originally enacted

Revised text of statute as amended

Text of the Exchequer Court (Scotland) Act 1707 as in force today (including any amendments) within the United Kingdom, from legislation.gov.uk.

The Exchequer Court (Scotland) Act 1707 (6 Ann. c. 53) is an act of the Parliament of Great Britain.

As of 2026, the act is partly in force in Great Britain.

== Subsequent developments ==
Sections 2 to 6, 8 to 10 and 14 to 32 were repealed by section 1 of, and the first schedule to, the Statute Law Revision Act 1948 (11 & 12 Geo. 6. c. 62), which came into force on 30 July 1948.
