= Norwich Guildhall Court =

The Norwich Guildhall Court was, at the time of its abolition, a local court of record which actively exercised a civil jurisdiction comparable to or greater than that of the county court for the district in which it was situated. The court appears to have originated in a court of husting, on the model of that of London.

The court was held under a grant of Richard I and other charters. The charter of Charles II granted

"… that the sheriffs of the city and its county, may hold their court of pleas in the Guildhall, and prosecute and try, in the name of the mayor, sheriffs, citizens, and commonalty of the said city, any plea, in any personal or mixed action, and any cause or matter arising or happening in the said city or county; and upon every recovery or judgment given in the sheriff's court, they may levy damages given, and costs of suit, by distress taken on the goods and chattels of every person against whom such judgment has been given; and in failure of goods and chattels, then on those of their sureties, or may arrest their bodies or the bodies of the said sureties."

By the Municipal Corporations Act 1835 (5 & 6 Will. 4. c. 76), this court was confirmed in all its powers, and the town council were empowered "to appoint the necessary officer, before whom such court is to be holden." This officer was called the Judge of the Borough Court. The steward was formerly the assessor to this court.

By 1911, the procedure of the court was that established by the Common Law Procedure Acts 1852 and 1854. The whole of the provisions of the Summary Procedure on Bills of Exchange Act 1855 (18 & 19 Vict. c. 67) were extended to this court, as also were those of the Schedule to the Borough and Local Courts of Record Act 1872 (35 & 36 Vict. c. 86).

== Abolition ==
The Norwich Guildhall Court was abolished by section 43(1)(c) of the Courts Act 1971.

Offices

Any judicial or other office in the Norwich Guildhall Court was abolished by section 44(1)(b) of the Courts Act 1971.

Section 44(2) conferred a power to make regulations to provide for the compensation of persons who suffered loss of employment or loss or diminution of emoluments attributable to the effect of section 44(1)(b) or to the abolition of the Norwich Guildhall Court.

Transitional provisions

Transitional provisions were made by section 43(2) of, and Part III of Schedule 5 to the Courts Act 1971.

== Public records ==
Records of the Norwich Guildhall Court are public records within the meaning of the Public Records Act 1958.

== See also ==
- Norwich Guildhall
