= Criminal Procedure Act 1851 =

Act of the Parliament of the United Kingdom

Criminal Procedure Act 1851 (Note: The citation of this act by this short title was authorised by section 1 of, and the first schedule to, the Short Titles Act 1896. Due to the repeal of those provisions it is now authorised by section 19(2) of the Interpretation Act 1978.)
- Act of Parliament
- Parliament of the United Kingdom
- Long title: An Act for further improving the Administration of Criminal Justice.
- Citation: 14 & 15 Vict. c. 100
- Territorial extent: England and Wales; Scotland; (Note: Section 32.)

Dates
- Royal assent: 7 August 1851
- Commencement: 1 September 1851 (Note: Section 21.)
- Repealed: 2 May 1986
Other legislation
Amends	Pleading in Misdemeanor Act 1819; Offences against the Person Act 1837
Amended by	Criminal Statutes Repeal Act 1861; Statute Law Revision Act 1875; Perjury Act 1911; Indictments Act 1915; Larceny Act 1916; Criminal Justice Act 1948; Statute Law Revision Act 1950; Criminal Law Act 1967; Courts Act 1971; Judicature (Northern Ireland) Act 1978
Repealed by	Statute Law (Repeals) Act 1986

Status: Repealed

Text of statute as originally enacted

Revised text of statute as amended

The Criminal Procedure Act 1851 (14 & 15 Vict. c. 100) was an act of the Parliament of the United Kingdom. It was drafted by Charles Sprengel Greaves. Stephen said that compared to earlier legislation on defects in indictments, the Criminal Procedure Act 1851 "went further in the way of removing technicalities, but it did so by an enumeration of them, so technical and minute, that no one could possibly understand it who had not first acquainted himself with all the technicalities which it was meant to abolish."

== Subsequent developments ==
Sections 4, 6, 8, 11, 13, 14, 15, 16, 17, and so much of section 5 "as relates to forging or uttering any Instrument", and so much of section 29 "as relates to any indecent Assault, or any Assault occasioning actual bodily Harm or any Attempt to have carnal Knowledge of a Girl under Twelve Years of Age" were repealed by section 1 of, and the schedule to, the Criminal Statutes Repeal Act 1861 (24 & 25 Vict. c. 95).

In section 1 of the act, the words "both with respect to the liability of witnesses to be prosecuted for perjury and otherwise", and sections 19–22 of the act, were repealed by section 17 of, and the schedule to, the Perjury Act 1911 (1 & 2 Geo. 5. c. 6), which came into force on 1 January 1912.

In section 5 of the act, so far as it related to Ireland, the words "stealing, "embezzling," and the words "or for obtaining by false pretences" and in section 18 of the act, the words from "and in cases" to the end of the section, were repealed by section 48(1) of, and the schedule to, the Larceny Act 1916 (6 & 7 Geo. 5. c. 50), which came into force on 1 January 1917.

Section 29 was repealed for Northern Ireland by section 1(1) of, and the first schedule to, the Statute Law Revision Act 1950 (14 Geo. 6. c. 6), which came into force on 23 May 1950.

Sections 9 and 12 and in section 30, the word " information ", the words " and presentment," and the words from " and the terms " to " a presentment ", of the act were repealed for England and Wales by section 10(2) of, and part III of schedule 3 to, the Criminal Law Act 1967, which came into force on 1 January 1968.

Section 27 of the act was repealed for Northern Ireland by section 122(1) of, and part I of schedule 7 to, the Judicature (Northern Ireland) Act 1978.

The whole act was repealed by section 1(1) of, and group 1 of part I of schedule 1 to, the Statute Law (Repeals) Act 1986, which came into force on 2 May 1986.

== See also ==
- Criminal Procedure Act
