= Administration of Justice (Miscellaneous Provisions) Act 1938 =

Act of the Parliament of the United Kingdom

Administration of Justice (Miscellaneous Provisions) Act 1938 (Note: Section 20(1).)
- Act of Parliament
- Parliament of the United Kingdom
- Long title: An Act to amend the law with respect to assizes and to quarter sessions and with respect to proceedings heretofore usually dealt with on the Crown side of the King's Bench Division of the High Court; to enable effect to be given to international conventions affecting English Courts; to extend the jurisdiction of county courts and to amend the Supreme Court of Judicature (Consolidation) Act, 1925, and the County Courts Act, 1934; to amend the law relating to appeals from the Mayor's and City of London Court; and for purposes connected with the matters aforesaid.
- Citation: 1 & 2 Geo. 6. c. 63
- Territorial extent: England and Wales (Note: Section 20(4).)

Dates
- Royal assent: 29 July 1938
- Commencement: 1 January 1939 (Note: Section 20(5).)
- Repealed: 1 January 1982
Other legislation
Amends	State Immunity Act 1978; See § Repealed enactments
Amended by	Matrimonial Causes Act 1950; Magistrates' Courts Act 1952; Sexual Offences Act 1956; County Courts Act 1959; Statute Law Revision Act 1959; Charities Act 1960; Criminal Law Act 1967; Courts Act 1971; Administration of Justice Act 1977; Justices of the Peace Act 1979
Repealed by	Supreme Court Act 1981

Status: Repealed

Text of statute as originally enacted

The Administration of Justice (Miscellaneous Provisions) Act 1938 (1 & 2 Geo. 6. c. 63) was an act of the Parliament of the United Kingdom that amended the law relating to assizes and quarter sessions, proceedings on the Crown side of the King's Bench Division of the High Court of Justice, and county courts in England and Wales.

== Subsequent developments ==
The whole act was repealed by section 152(4) of, and schedule 7 to, the Supreme Court Act 1981, which came into force on 1 January 1982.
