= Costs in Criminal Cases Act 1952 =

Act of the Parliament of the United Kingdom

Costs in Criminal Cases Act 1952 (Note: Section 19(1).)
- Act of Parliament
- Parliament of the United Kingdom
- Long title: An Act to consolidate certain enactments relating to costs in criminal cases with corrections and improvements made under the Consolidation of Enactments (Procedure) Act, 1949.
- Citation: 15 & 16 Geo. 6 & 1 Eliz. 2. c. 48
- Territorial extent: England and Wales (Note: Section 19(2).)

Dates
- Royal assent: 1 August 1952
- Commencement: 1 January 1953 (Note: Section 19(3).)
- Repealed: 18 July 1973
Other legislation
Amends	See § Repealed enactments
Repeals/revokes	See § Repealed enactments
Amended by	Criminal Law Act 1967; Criminal Appeal Act 1968; Criminal Justice Act 1972; Statute Law (Repeals) Act 1974
Repealed by	Costs in Criminal Cases Act 1973
Relates to	Magistrates' Courts Act 1952

Status: Repealed

Text of statute as originally enacted

The Costs in Criminal Cases Act 1952 (15 & 16 Geo. 6 & 1 Eliz. 2. c. 48) was an act of the Parliament of the United Kingdom that consolidated enactments relating to costs in criminal cases in England and Wales.

== Provisions ==
=== Repealed enactments ===
Section 18(1) of the act repealed 11 enactments, listed in the schedule to the act.

Citation	Short title	Extent of repeal
2 & 3 Vict. c. 71	Metropolitan Police Courts Act 1839	Section thirty-one, so far as it relates to criminal cases.
11 & 12 Vict. c. 43	Summary Jurisdiction Act 1848	In section sixteen, the words from "with or without costs" onwards so far as they relate to criminal cases. In section eighteen, the words "of summary conviction or", the words "conviction or" in every subsequent place where they occur, the words "convicting or", and the words "prosecutor or" and "respectively" in both places where they respectively occur. In section twenty-four, the words "conviction or" in the last place where they occur and the words "prosecutor or". In section twenty-six, the words "prosecutor or" wherever they occur.
42 & 43 Vict. c. 49	Summary Jurisdiction Act 1879	In section eight the words from "except so far as the court" to "any costs and". Section twenty-eight.
62 & 63 Vict. c. 35	Inebriates Act 1899	Section one.
1 Edw. 7. c. 23	Criminal Appeal Act 1907	Section thirteen.
8 Edw. 7. c. 15	Costs in Criminal Cases Act 1908	The whole act.
15 & 16 Geo. 5. c. 86	Criminal Justice Act 1925	In section eleven, subsections (1) and (2) so far as they relate to costs.
23 & 24 Geo. 5. c. 12	Children and Young Persons Act 1933	In section fifty-nine, subsection (2).
23 & 24 Geo. 5. c. 36	Administration of Justice (Miscellaneous Provisions) Act 1933	In the Second Schedule, paragraph 3.
11 & 12 Geo. 6. c. 58	Criminal Justice Act 1948	In section twenty, paragraph (c) of subsection (5). In section twenty-nine, paragraph (c) of subsection (3). In section thirty-eight, subsection (5). Section forty-four. The Ninth Schedule so far as it amends section thirteen of the Criminal Appeal Act 1907 and the Costs in Criminal Cases Act 1908.
12, 13 & 14 Geo. 6. c. 68	Representation of the People Act 1949	In section one hundred and fifty, subsections (1) to (4).

== Subsequent developments ==
Section 18(1) of, and the schedule to, the act were repealed by section 1 of, and part XI of the schedule to, the Statute Law (Repeals) Act 1974, which came into force on 27 June 1974.

The whole act was repealed by section 21(2) of, and schedule 2 to, the Costs in Criminal Cases Act 1973, which came into force on 18 July 1973.
