= Criminal Justice Act 1925 =

Act of the Parliament of the United Kingdom

Criminal Justice Act 1925 (Note: Section 49(1).)
- Act of Parliament
- Parliament of the United Kingdom
- Long title: An Act to amend the law with respect to the administration of criminal justice in England, and otherwise to amend the criminal law.
- Citation: 15 & 16 Geo. 5. c. 86
- Territorial extent: England and Wales; Isle of Man (section 46(2)); (Note: Section 49(3).)

Dates
- Royal assent: 22 December 1925
- Commencement: 1 June 1926: except part I; 1 July 1926: part I; (Note: Section 49(5).)
- Repealed: Isle of Man: 22 July 2004
Other legislation
Repeals/revokes	Quarter Sessions Act 1814
Amended by	Criminal Justice (Amendment) Act 1926; Children and Young Persons Act 1933; Administration of Justice (Miscellaneous Provisions) Act 1933; Criminal Justice Act 1948; Justices of the Peace Act 1949; Costs in Criminal Cases Act 1952; Magistrates' Courts Act 1952; Sexual Offences Act 1956; Mental Health Act 1959; Criminal Law Act 1967; Courts Act 1971; Prosecution of Offences Act 1979; Forgery and Counterfeiting Act 1981; Statute Law (Repeals) Act 1998
Repealed by	Isle of Man: Statute Law (Repeals) Act 2004

Status: Partially repealed

Text of statute as originally enacted

Revised text of statute as amended

Text of the Criminal Justice Act 1925 as in force today (including any amendments) within the United Kingdom, from legislation.gov.uk.

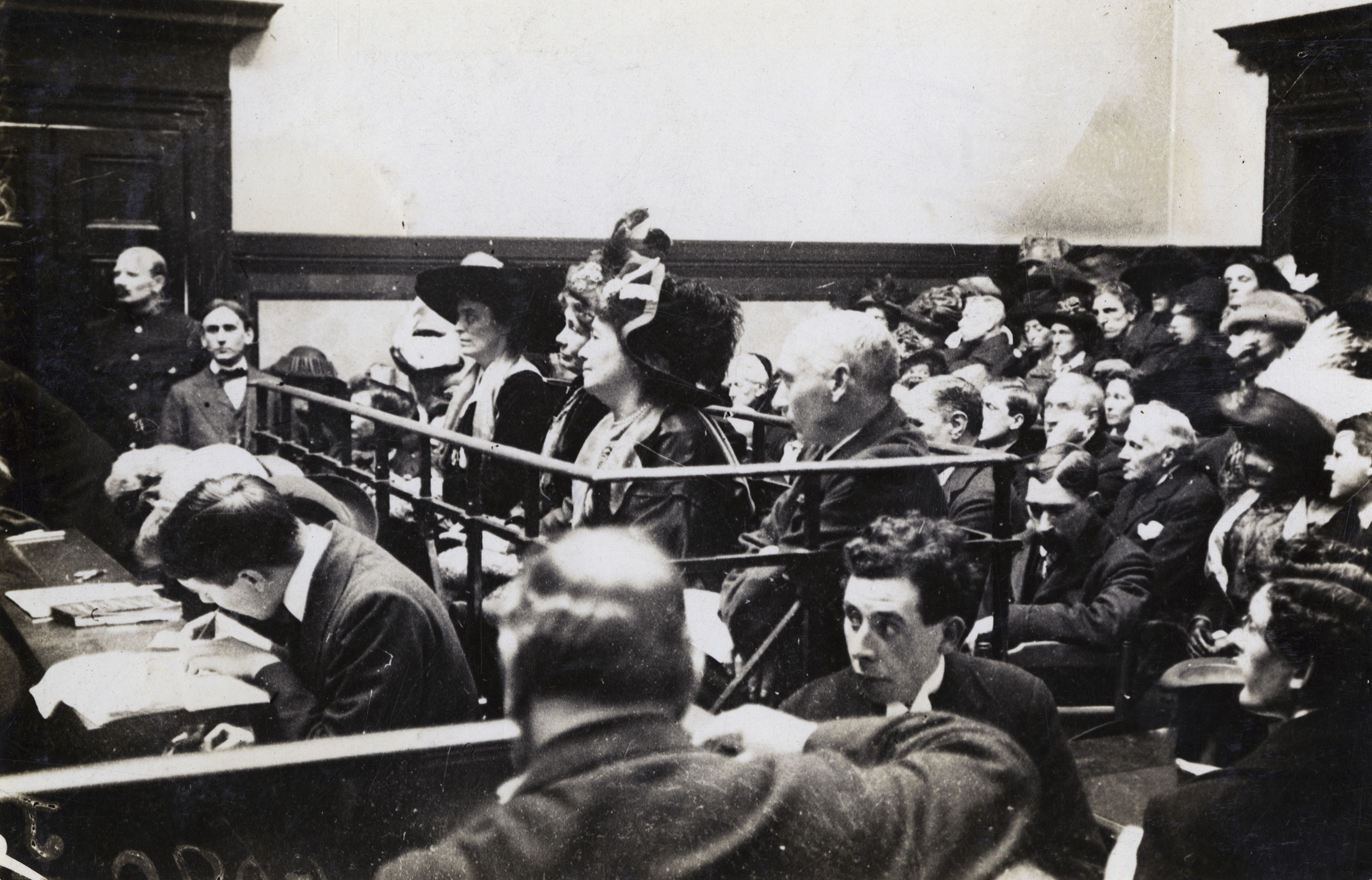
Emmeline Pankhurst in court in 1912 prior to the prohibition of photography

The Criminal Justice Act 1925 (15 & 16 Geo. 5. c. 86) is an act of the Parliament of the United Kingdom. Most of it has been repealed.

Section 36 of the act makes it an offence to make a false statement to obtain a passport. The maximum sentence is two years.

Section 41 of the act prohibits the taking of photographs in a court in England and Wales, save for the Supreme Court. In September 2011, Lord Chancellor Kenneth Clarke announced that the government intended to partially repeal this ban in order to increase the public's understanding of the administration of justice. Initially, filming of the handing down of judgments in the Court of Appeal was to be permitted, with a view that filming of sentencing remarks will eventually be permitted in the Crown Court. The first case of sentencing remarks being filmed in a Crown Court was on 28 July 2022 at the Old Bailey which saw sentence passed on Ben Oliver whom had been convicted of manslaughter. The broadcast was hosted on the Sky News YouTube channel with a 10 second delay to avoid breach of restrictions or errors.

Other provisions of the act deal with criminal procedure against corporations, the defence of marital coercion (since abolished), and unlawful possession of pension documents.

== Subsequent developments ==
The whole act was repealed for the Isle of Man by section 1(1) of, and group 11 of part 17 of schedule 1 to, the Statute Law (Repeals) Act 2004, which came into force on 22 July 2004.
