= Senior Courts Act 1981 =

Act of the Parliament of the United Kingdom

Senior Courts Act 1981 (Note: Section 153(1) provided that the act may be cited as the "Supreme Court Act 1981". However, this short title was renamed by the Constitutional Reform Act 2005.)
- Act of Parliament
- Parliament of the United Kingdom
- Long title: An Act to consolidate with amendments the Supreme Court of Judicature (Consolidation) Act 1925 and other enactments relating to the Supreme Court of England and Wales and the administration of justice therein; to repeal certain obsolete or unnecessary enactments so relating; to amend Part VIII of the Mental Health Act 1959, the Courts-Martial (Appeals) Act 1968, the Arbitration Act 1979 and the law relating to county courts; and for connected purposes.
- Citation: 1981 c. 54
- Territorial extent: England and Wales (largely), with some sections applying to Scotland and England and Wales (Note: Section 153(3).)

Dates
- Royal assent: 28 July 1981
- Commencement: 1 January 1982 (Note: Section 153(2).)

Other legislation
- Amends: Administration of Justice (Miscellaneous Provisions) Act 1933; Arbitration Act 1950; Courts-Martial (Appeals) Act 1968; Courts Act 1971; Misuse of Drugs Act 1971; Land Charges Act 1972; Evidence (Proceedings in other Jurisdictions) Act 1975; Insurance Brokers (Registration) Act 1977

Status: Amended

Text of statute as originally enacted

Revised text of statute as amended

Text of the Senior Courts Act 1981 as in force today (including any amendments) within the United Kingdom, from legislation.gov.uk.

The Senior Courts Act 1981 (c. 54), originally named the Supreme Court Act 1981, is an act of the Parliament of the United Kingdom.

The Act prescribes the structure and jurisdictions of the Senior Courts of England and Wales (previously known collectively as the "Supreme Court"). These Senior Courts comprise: the Court of Appeal, the High Court of Justice, and the Crown Court.

== Change of name ==
The Constitutional Reform Act 2005 established a new Supreme Court which, on 1 October 2009, replaced the Appellate Committee of the House of Lords.

To avoid confusion, the Supreme Court Act 1981 was renamed the Senior Courts Act 1981, and all statutory references to the Supreme Court of England and Wales were amended to refer to the Senior Courts of England and Wales. The former term "Supreme Court" did not mean the 2009 Supreme Court (which did not exist in 1981), but was shorthand for the "Supreme Court of England and Wales", called before 1981 the "Supreme Court of Judicature".

== Provisions ==
The act allows a High Court judge to make non-party costs orders against people who support litigation against another party. Courts are able to grant an injunction under the act.

=== Section 2 ===
Section 2 of the act limited the number of Court of Appeal judges to a number of ex-officio judges and "not more than eighteen ordinary judges". The number of ex-officio judges could vary because it included both the Lord Chancellor and "any person who has been Lord Chancellor" who might wish to remain as an appellate judge.

=== Section 75 ===
The following directions have been given pursuant to section 75(1) by the Lord Chief Justice. They are titled "Classification of the business of the Crown Court and allocation to Crown Court centres":

- Practice Direction [1995] 2 All ER 900, [1995] 1 WLR 1083 (26 May 1995)
- Practice Direction [1998] 3 All ER 384, [1995] 1 WLR 1244, CA (30 June 1998)
- Practice Direction [2000] 1 All ER 380, CA (Crim) (10 January 2000)

=== Repealed enactments ===
Section 152(4) of the act repealed 89 enactments, listed in schedule 7 to the act.
