= Powers of the home secretary =

Powers in law enforcement, national security, public order, migration, and other areas

The home secretary is one of the most senior and influential ministers in the UK government, and the holder of a Great Office of State. The home secretary's remit includes law enforcement in England and Wales, matters of national security, issues concerning immigration, and oversight of the Security Service (MI5).

The home secretary's exercise of these powers is dependent on the ongoing consent and agreement of the prime minister and the rest of the Cabinet, as required by the doctrine of Cabinet collective responsibility. The prime minister can overrule the home secretary's decisions. For example, Boris Johnson reportedly overruled Home Secretary Priti Patel on closing UK borders, and Margaret Thatcher overruled Home Secretary Leon Brittan on parole for Ian Brady and Myra Hindley. The prime minister can also dismiss the home secretary.

== Overview ==
The Policing Protocol Order 2011 sets out the roles and responsibilities of different bodies. For the home secretary, it states:

The Home Secretary is ultimately accountable to Parliament and charged with ensuring the maintenance of the Queen's Peace within all force areas, safeguarding the public and protecting our national borders and security. The Home Secretary possesses reserved powers and legislative instruments that allow for intervention and direction to all relevant parties, if deemed necessary to prevent or mitigate risks to the public or national security. Such powers and tools will be used only as a last resort, and will not be used to interfere with the democratic will of the electorate within a force area, nor seek to interfere with the office of constable, unless the Home Secretary is satisfied on the advice of Her Majesty's Inspectorate of Constabulary that not to do so would result in a police force failing or national security being compromised.

The Home Secretary retains the legal accountability for national security and the role that the police service plays within the delivery of any national response. The Home Secretary has a duty to issue a Strategic Policing Requirement that sets out what are, in her view, the national threats at the time and the appropriate national policing capabilities that are required to counter them.

== Law enforcement ==
The home secretary has oversight of law enforcement in England and Wales, and UK-wide elements of law enforcement. Law enforcement within Scotland and Northern Ireland is largely devolved.

=== Policing ===
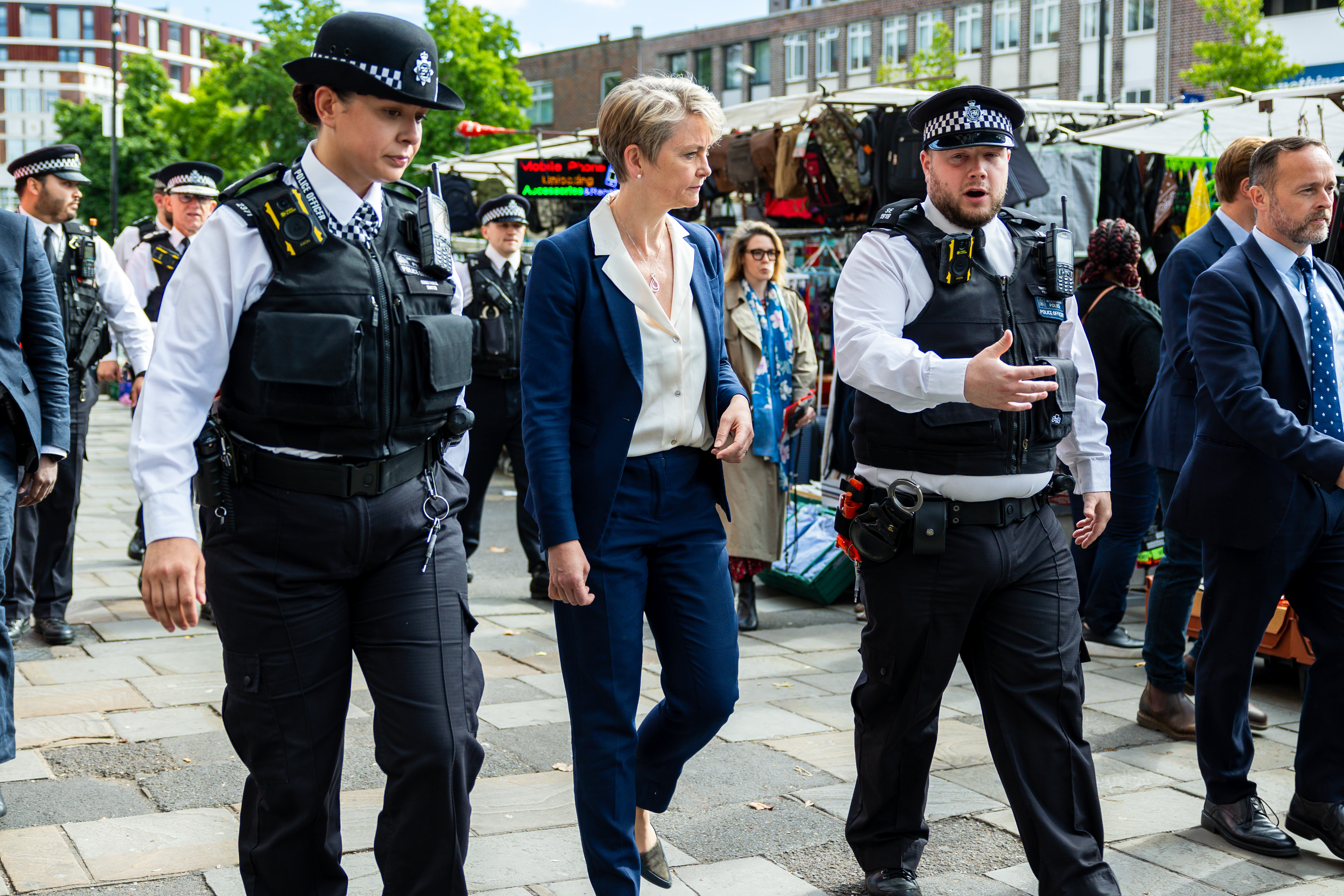
Home Secretary Yvette Cooper visits the Metropolitan Police in Lewisham.

The Police Act 1996 provides any secretary of state, in practice the home secretary, with powers including:

- The power to direct a police force they are satisfied is failing, or will fail, to discharge any of its functions in an effective manner, to take specified measures.
- The power to require a chief officer of police of any police force to provide them with information on such matters as they specify, and require a chief officer to publish this information.
- The power to approve (or not) codes of practice issued by the College of Policing.
- The power to alter police areas by order.

The Police Reform and Social Responsibility Act 2011 amended the Police Act 1996, so it requires any secretary of state, in practice the home secretary, to issue a document called the Strategic Policing Requirement, and update it from time to time, that sets out the current national threats and the national policing capabilities needed to counter them. Police and crime commissioners and chief constables must have regard to this when carrying out their functions. For example, Tom Winsor, when Chief Inspector of Constabulary in 2021, wrote that, 'In 2015, the then Home Secretary, Theresa May, added child sexual abuse to the Strategic Policing Requirement as a new national threat. This meant that the National Crime Agency (NCA) and the police have to give special emphasis to tackling child sexual abuse.'

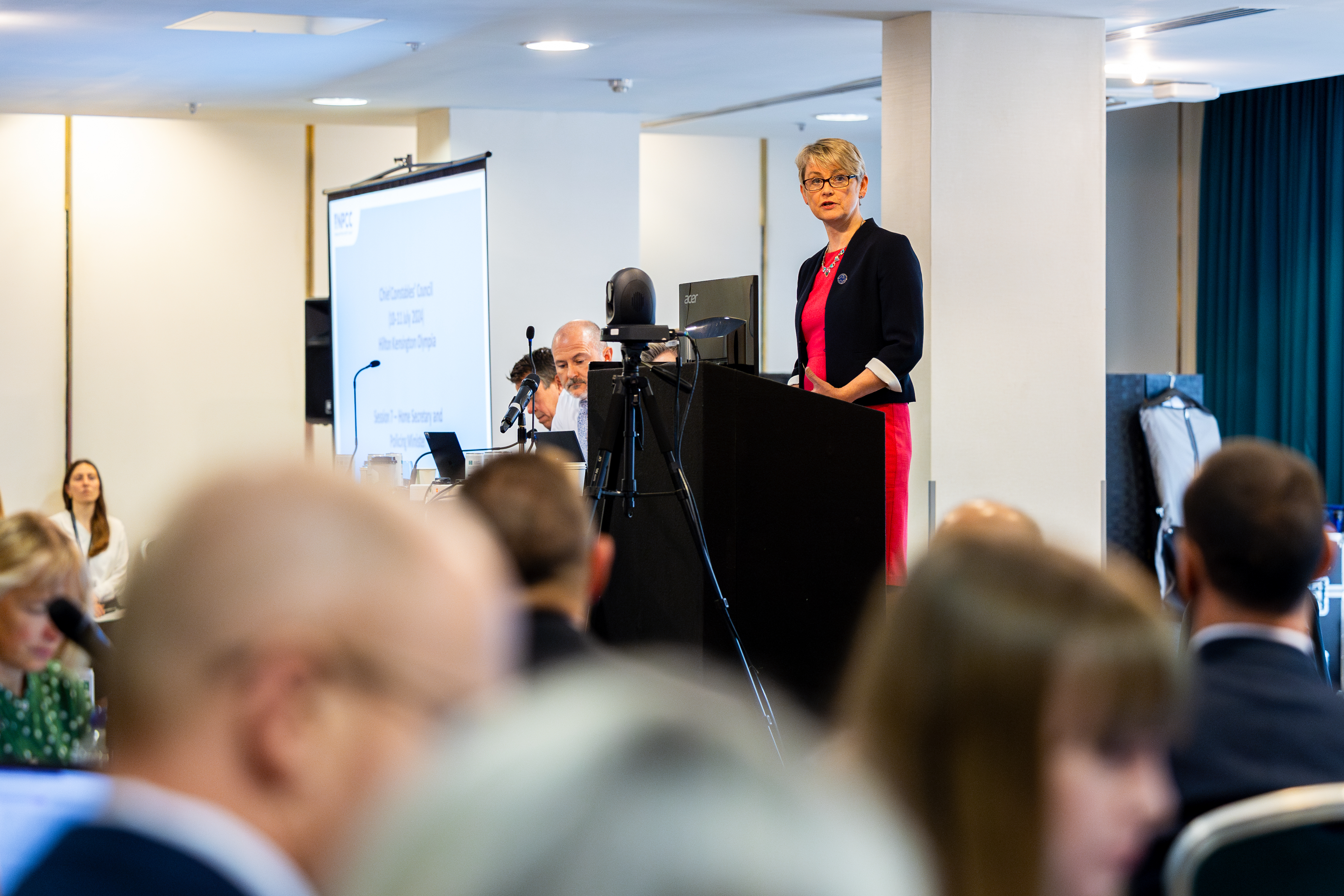
Home Secretary Yvette Cooper speaking at the Association of Police and Crime Commissioners Annual General Meeting.

The home secretary also influences the way policing is conducted by, for example, meeting with police leaders to establish priorities and hold them to account, publicly calling on the police to enforce particular laws, and setting standards and expectations by writing letters and making speeches to police leaders or police officers.

The home secretary is the sole shareholder and owner of the College of Policing Limited, a company limited by guarantee. Therefore, the home secretary has corporate powers in respect of the college derived from the Companies Act 2006. The home secretary appoints its chair and its chief executive officer. The Anti-Social Behaviour, Crime and Policing Act 2014 provides the home secretary with a power of veto regarding any regulations the college requests to make, and a power to direct the college to exercise any of its functions.

The Police, Crime, Sentencing and Courts Act 2022 requires any secretary of state, in practice the home secretary, to lay before Parliament each financial year a Police Covenant annual report.

The home secretary has no power to direct individual police operations, as police forces have operational independence from the government. However, what constitutes legitimate oversight and what constitutes interference in operational decision-making can be disputed.

=== Early release of prisoners on compassionate grounds ===
The Crime (Sentences) Act 1997 provides any secretary of state with the power to release a life prisoner on compassionate grounds, and the Criminal Justice Act 2003 provides the same power for fixed-term prisoners. Previously, these powers were exercised by the home secretary. However, they are now exercised by the justice secretary.

=== Legislation ===
The home secretary initiates and guides legislation through Parliament that creates and abolishes offences, and sets or changes their punishment, thereby shaping society. For example, Home Secretary Roy Jenkins oversaw measures such as the effective abolition in Britain of both capital punishment and theatre censorship, the partial decriminalisation of homosexuality, relaxing of divorce law, suspension of birching and the liberalisation of abortion law. Simon Heffer wrote that, 'Bogdanor correctly identifies the massive social changes Roy Jenkins accomplished as Home Secretary, which largely invented the society in which, for better or worse, we live today.'

The home secretary also guides legislation through Parliament that changes policing structures. For example, the Police Reform and Social Responsibility Act 2011 transferred the control of police forces from police authorities to elected Police and Crime Commissioners.

=== Appointments ===
==== Senior policing roles ====
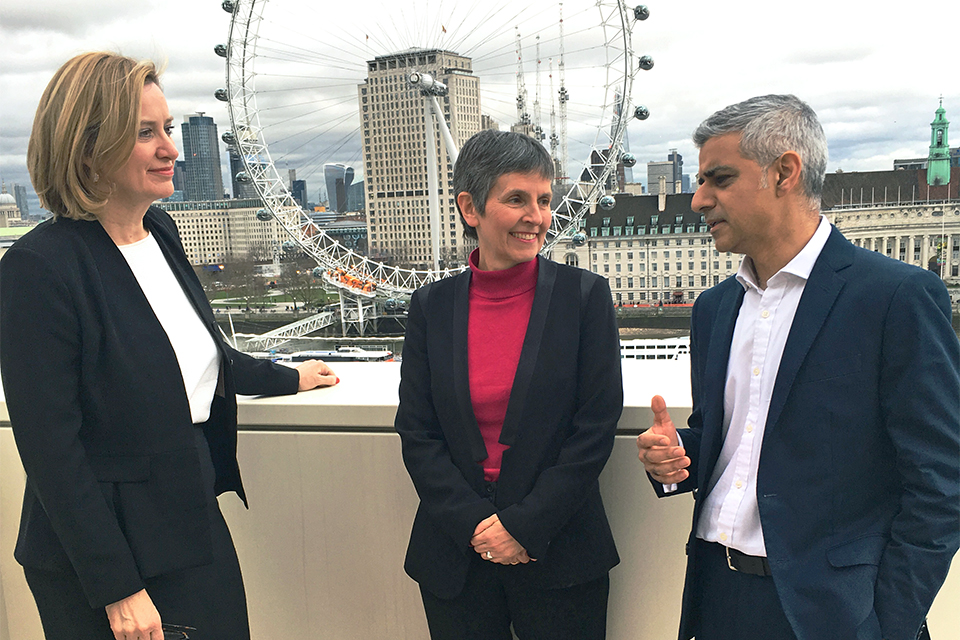
Left to right: Home Secretary Amber Rudd; Cressida Dick, about to be appointed Metropolitan Police Commissioner; and Mayor of London Sadiq Khan.

Under the Police Reform and Social Responsibility Act 2011, the Metropolitan Police Commissioner, regarded as the highest rank in British policing, and Deputy Commissioner are formally appointed by the king on the recommendation of any secretary of state, in practice the home secretary. The Commissioner and Deputy Commissioner then hold office at His Majesty's pleasure. The home secretary may require the Mayor's Office for Policing and Crime to call upon the Commissioner or Deputy Commissioner to retire or resign, or to suspend the Commissioner or Deputy Commissioner.

The Crime and Courts Act 2013 requires any secretary of state, in practice the home secretary, to select and appoint the Director-General of the National Crime Agency, and determine the terms and conditions of their appointment. The home secretary determines the strategic priorities for the National Crime Agency, but the Director-General has the power to decide which operations to mount, and how they will be conducted. The home secretary may call upon the Director General to resign or retire, who must then do so.

==== Oversight of policing ====
Under the Police Act 1996, inspectors in His Majesty's Inspectorate of Constabulary, and the Chief Inspector of Constabulary, are appointed by the king on the advice of any secretary of state, in practice the home secretary. The annual inspection programme is subject to the approval of the home secretary, who may also require further inspections of police forces, beyond the terms of the annual inspection programme, to be conducted.

Under a 2017 addition to the Police Reform Act 2002, any secretary of state, in practice the home secretary, may, by regulations, designate an organisation as able to make a super-complaint to Her Majesty's Chief Inspector of Constabulary that a feature of policing in England and Wales by one or more police forces is significantly harming the interests of the public. The secretary of state does this after applying criteria specified in regulations made by the secretary of state.

Under a 2017 amendment to the Police Reform Act 2002, the Director General of the Independent Office for Police Conduct is appointed by the king on the advice of the home secretary. The act also requires any secretary of state, in practice the home secretary, to appoint the non-executive directors. The secretary of state can require the IOPC to make reports to them at any time.

==== Commissioners ====
Under the Domestic Violence, Crime and Victims Act 2004, the justice secretary must consult the home secretary before appointing a Commissioner for Victims and Witnesses.

The Modern Slavery Act 2015 requires any secretary of state, in practice the home secretary, to appoint an Independent Anti-Slavery Commissioner.

==== Other appointments ====
The Anti-social Behaviour, Crime and Policing Act 2014, which established the Police Remuneration Review Body, provides for any secretary of state, in practice the home secretary, to appoint five or more members of this Body, including the deputy chair.

Under the Protection of Freedoms Act 2012, any secretary of state, in practice the home secretary, appoints the chair and board members of the Disclosure and Barring Service.

== National security ==
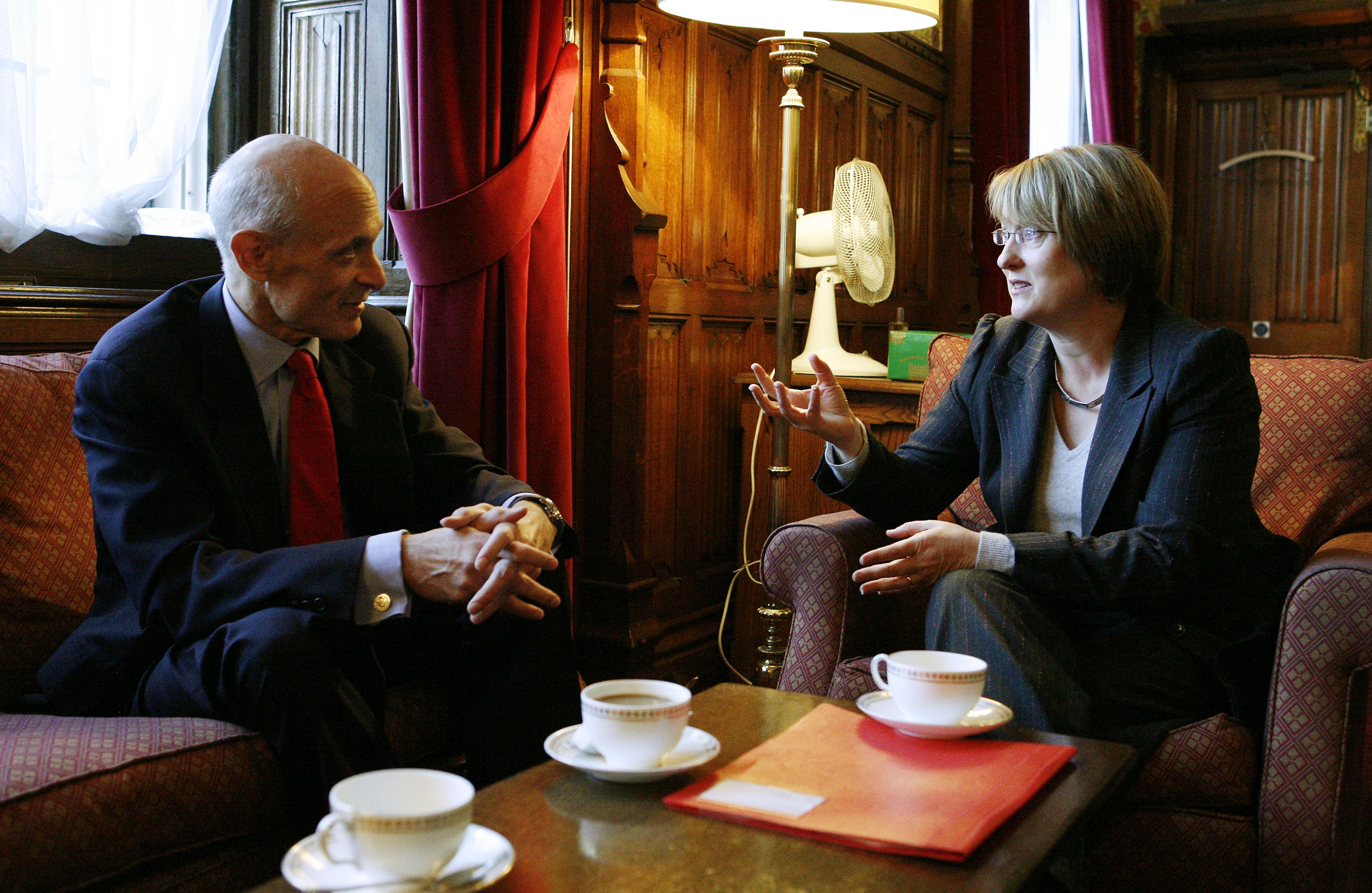
Home Secretary Jacqui Smith meets US Secretary of Homeland Security Michael Chertoff.

The prime minister is the minister responsible for national security, and matters affecting SIS, MI5 and GCHQ collectively. However, the home secretary also retains legal accountability for national security.

MI5 operates under the authority of the home secretary, who is accountable to Parliament for its work. Under the Security Service Act 1989, any secretary of state, in practice the home secretary, appoints the Director General of MI5. The home secretary personally signs warrants, issued under the Investigatory Powers Act 2016, that authorise MI5's most intrusive intelligence-gathering activities.

Under the Terrorism Act 2000, any secretary of state, in practice the home secretary, may, by order, proscribe an organisation if they believe it is concerned in terrorism, and it is proportionate to do so.

The Terrorism Act 2006 requires any secretary of state, in practice the home secretary, to appoint an Independent Reviewer of Terrorism Legislation.

The National Security Act 2023 requires any secretary of state, in practice the home secretary, to appoint an Independent Reviewer of State Threats Legislation.

The home secretary is responsible for the protective security provided to members of the Royal Family and other public figures. In practice, this responsibility is delegated to an executive committee, the Royal and VIP Executive Committee (RAVEC).

The home secretary is a member of the National Security Council.

== Public safety ==
Section 141 of the Criminal Justice Act 1988 provides any secretary of state, in practice the home secretary, with the power to define certain illegal types of offensive weapon, through statutory instrument.

== Public order ==
Under the Public Order Act 1986, the Metropolitan Police Commissioner, or a local council on behalf of a chief police officer, can apply to any secretary of state, in practice the home secretary, for consent to prohibit public processions to avoid serious public disorder. In 2010–11, home secretary Theresa May banned marches by the English Defence League.

The Public Order Act 1986 also provides for chief police officers to impose conditions on public processions, in order to prevent serious public disorder, serious damage to property, or serious disruption to the life of the community. The Police, Crime, Sentencing and Courts Act 2022 amended this act to provide for any secretary of state, in practice the home secretary, to amend the definition of serious disruption, by regulations.

The Public Order Act 2023 provides any secretary of state, in practice the home secretary, with the power to bring civil proceedings and seek injunctions against protesters when 'protest action is causing, or is likely to cause, serious disruption to key national infrastructure or access to essential goods or services in England and Wales, or where protest activities have, or are likely to have, a serious adverse effect on public safety'.

== Extradition ==
In accordance with the Extradition Act 2003, an extradition request from another country is sent to any secretary of state, in practice the home secretary, once a judge decides it can proceed after considering various aspects of the case. This act outlines the grounds on which the secretary of state must decide whether they are prohibited from ordering the person's extradition. These are:

- if the person is at risk of the death penalty;
- if specialty arrangements are in place (these need to be in place to ensure that an extradited person only faces proceedings in respect of the conduct for which extradition was ordered). If the requesting state wishes to proceed on the basis of another offence, they must request the UK's consent before doing so;
- if the person concerned has previously been extradited from another country to the UK and the consent of that country to their onward extradition is required; and
- if the person has previously been transferred to the UK by the International Criminal Court.

If none of these four tests provide grounds to refuse the request, the home secretary must order extradition. The home secretary cannot, by law, consider any other grounds.

== British citizenship ==
In accordance with the British Nationality Act 1981, any secretary of state, in practice the home secretary, has the power to revoke citizenship from a person if it is considered in the public good or if their citizenship was obtained by fraud. This is usually done in the context of national security and counter-terrorism and aims to ensure a person who poses a threat to the United Kingdom cannot return to the country as they otherwise could.

For people with naturalised British citizenship deprivation is allowed even if this would leave the person stateless. Yet someone who is born British and has no other nationality cannot be deprived of their citizenship under any circumstances.

== British passports ==
British passports are issued at the discretion of the home secretary under the authority of the Royal Prerogative. The home secretary can withdraw or withhold them from individuals using the same discretionary power. Note this is not the same as withdrawing British citizenship. On 25 April 2013, Home Secretary Theresa May laid a Written Ministerial Statement in the House of Commons that redefined the public interest criteria that would be used to refuse or withdraw a passport.

== Misuse of drugs ==
The Misuse of Drugs Act 1971 creates three classes of controlled drugs: A, B, and C. The list of drugs in each class can be amended by an Order in Council that has been laid before Parliament by any secretary of state and approved by each House of Parliament. In practice, this gives the home secretary the power to list new drugs, and upgrade, downgrade or delist previously controlled drugs. They are first required to consult with the Advisory Council on the Misuse of Drugs, but they do not have to follow the council's advice.

This act requires any secretary of state, in practice the home secretary, to appoint the members of the Advisory Council on the Misuse of Drugs. The home secretary appoints one of them to be chairman, and can ask them to resign.

The Police Reform and Social Responsibility Act 2011 inserted an additional power into the Misuse of Drugs Act, providing for any secretary of state, in practice the home secretary, to make temporary class drug orders by statutory instrument. These come into immediate effect and last for up to 12 months, subject to both Houses of Parliament agreeing to them within 40 sitting days of being made. This enables the home secretary to quickly bring new drugs under the control of the Misuse of Drugs Act.

Legislation on misuse of drugs is not devolved, so these powers have effect across the whole of the UK.

== Royal births ==
From 1894 the home secretary was required to attend royal births to ensure that the baby and potential heir to the throne was a descendant of the monarch, and not an imposter. This practice was discontinued by King George VI shortly before the birth of Prince Charles in 1948.

== Home Office ==
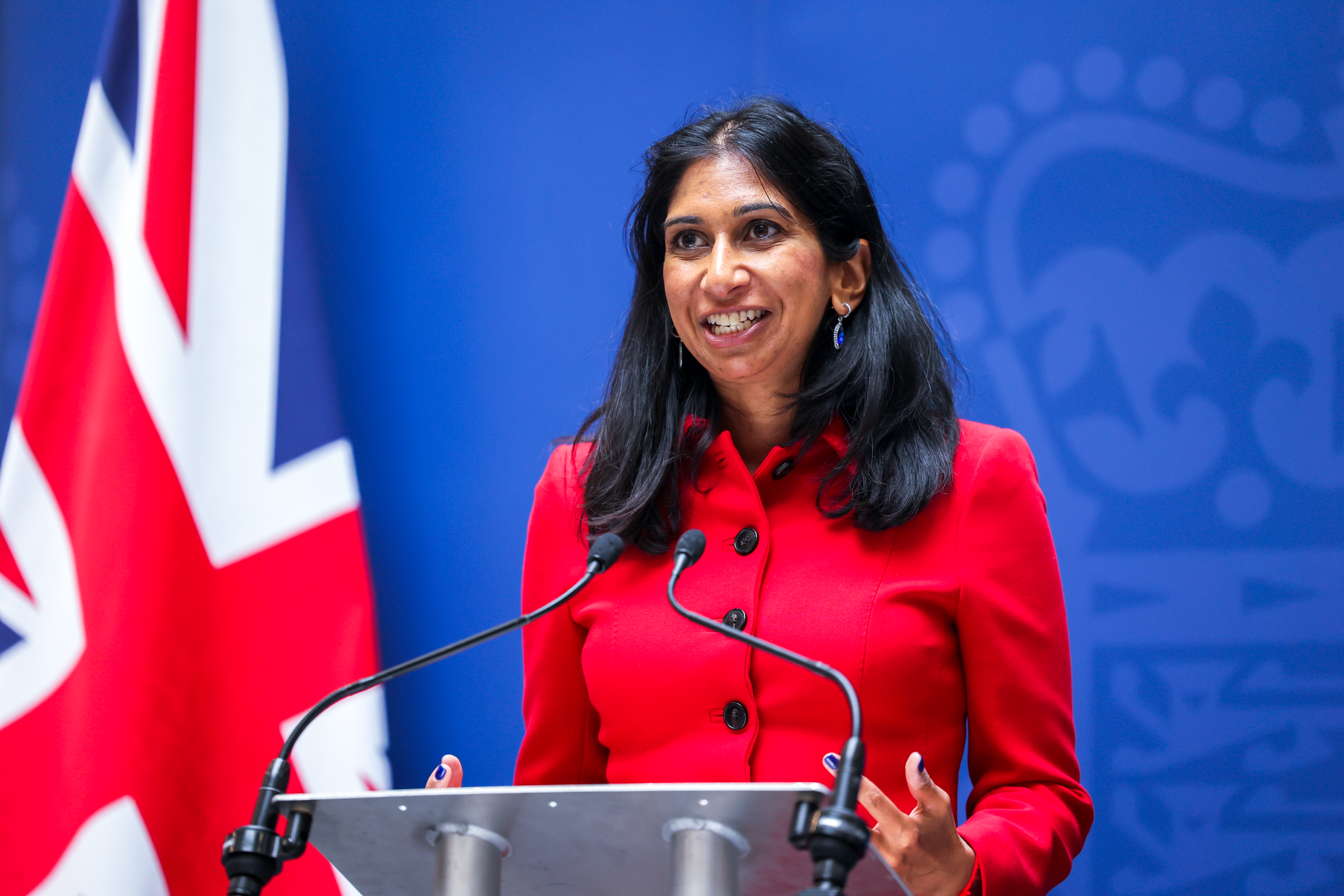
Home Secretary Suella Bravemen gives her first address to staff at 2 Marsham Street.

The home secretary is head of the Home Office, and has overall responsibility for all its business.

This includes oversight of the Home Office ministerial team, and the work of the Home Office civil servants, led by the permanent under-secretary of state of the Home Office.

The home secretary sets Home Office policy, including overruling Home Office civil servants if required.

== Acting on behalf of other secretaries of state ==
Legislation sometimes refers to particular secretaries of state. Often, however, legislation refers simply to "the Secretary of State" (capitalised thus) without further elaboration. By virtue of the Interpretation Act 1978, the phrase 'Secretary of State', when used in legislation, means "one of His Majesty's Principal Secretaries of State". This is because, while there is only one office of Secretary of State, in practice, more than one person will be appointed to the office, to carry out its functions. Each individual secretary of state is allocated responsibility by the Prime Minister for a particular department, and therefore, in practice, will normally exercise only the Secretary of State's functions that are within that portfolio. However, as there is only one office of Secretary of State, any secretary of state can act on another's behalf, and could exercise the other Secretary of State powers (except for powers given by the legislation to one particular secretary of state). Home Secretary John Simon said in a debate in the House of Commons in 1936:

Of course, originally, there was only one Secretary of State, and, indeed, in one sense it may be said that even today there is only one office of Secretary of State, because anyone who is a Secretary of State may lawfully and constitutionally perform any act that can be done by any other Secretary of State. If I may for a moment call on my own personal experience, I happened to be Secretary of State for Home Affairs at the time when [Secretary of State for War] Lord Kitchener made his last fatal journey from this country, and just before he sailed from these shores I had a message from the War Office asking me whether I would sign his papers until he came back. I continued to give the formal signature which it is legitimate for any Secretary of State to put upon the papers of any other Secretary of State, and I did so until the news came of his death. Constitutionally, the office of Secretary of State is held by a number of persons who may be regarded as all one.

== See also ==
- Home secretary
- Powers of the prime minister of the United Kingdom
