= Police and Magistrates' Courts Act 1994 =

Act of the Parliament of the United Kingdom

Police and Magistrates' Courts Act 1994 (Note: Section 97.)
- Act of Parliament
- Parliament of the United Kingdom
- Long title: An Act to make provision about police areas, police forces and police authorities; to make provision for England and Wales about magistrates' courts committees, justices' clerks and administrative and financial arrangements for magistrates' courts; and for connected purposes.
- Citation: 1994 c. 29
- Territorial extent: England and Wales (in part); Scotland (in part); Northern Ireland (in part); (Note: Section 96.)

Dates
- Royal assent: 21 July 1994
- Commencement: various (Note: Section 94.)
Other legislation
Amends	Riot (Damages) Act 1886; Administration of Justice Act 1964; Police Act 1964; Local Government Act 1966; Courts Act 1971; Pensions (Increase) Act 1971; Local Government (Scotland) Act 1973; Police Pensions Act 1976; Magistrates' Courts Act 1980; County Courts Act 1984; Housing Associations Act 1985; Drug Trafficking Offences Act 1986; Channel Tunnel Act 1987; Criminal Justice Act 1988; Town and Country Planning Act 1990; Courts and Legal Services Act 1990; Social Security (Consequential Provisions) Act 1992
Amended by	Police Act 1996; Justices of the Peace Act 1997; Audit Commission Act 1998; Postal Services Act 2000; Statute Law (Repeals) Act 2008

Status: Amended

Text of statute as originally enacted

Revised text of statute as amended

Text of the Police and Magistrates’ Courts Act 1994 as in force today (including any amendments) within the United Kingdom, from legislation.gov.uk.

The Police and Magistrates' Courts Act 1994 (c. 29) is an act of the Parliament of the United Kingdom.

It defined the police areas, constituted the current police authorities and set out the relationship between the Home Secretary and the territorial police forces. It superseded the Police Act 1964 and was itself replaced by the Police Act 1996.

== See also ==
- Police Act
- Magistrates' Courts Act
