= Riot (Damages) Act 1886 =

Act of the Parliament of the United Kingdom

Riot (Damages) Act 1886 (Note: Section 1.)
- Act of Parliament
- Parliament of the United Kingdom
- Long title: An Act to provide Compensation for Losses by Riots.
- Citation: 49 & 50 Vict. c. 38
- Territorial extent: England and Wales (Note: Section 11.)

Dates
- Royal assent: 25 June 1886
- Commencement: 25 June 1886 (Note: The Acts of Parliament (Commencement) Act 1793.)
- Repealed: 6 April 2017 (Note: The Riot Compensation Act 2016 (Commencement) Regulations 2017 (SI 2017/379).)
Other legislation
Amends	Merchant Shipping Act 1854
Repeals/revokes	Remedies Against the Hundred (England) Act 1827; Threshing Machines, Remedies for Damage Act 1832
Amended by	Merchant Shipping Act 1894; Statute Law Revision Act 1898; Police Act 1964; Decimal Currency Act 1969; Local Government Act 1972; Statute Law (Repeals) Act 1993; Police and Magistrates' Courts Act 1994; Police Act 1996; Greater London Authority Act 1999; Police Reform and Social Responsibility Act 2011
Repealed by	Riot Compensation Act 2016

Status: Repealed

Text of statute as originally enacted

Revised text of statute as amended

The Riot (Damages) Act 1886 (49 & 50 Vict. c. 38) was an act of the Parliament of the United Kingdom that authorised the payment of compensation, from the police fund of the police area in question, to persons whose property had been injured, destroyed or stolen during a riot. The whole act was repealed and replaced by the Riot Compensation Act 2016 which received royal assent on 23 March 2016.

In the act, the words "riotous" and "riotously" were to be construed in accordance with section 1 of the Public Order Act 1986.

The Supreme Court ruled in 2016 that the act sets out a self-contained statutory compensation scheme which does not extend to cover consequential losses.

== Provisions ==
=== Section 1 - Short title ===
Section 1 of the act authorised the citation of the act by a short title.

=== Section 2 - Compensation to persons for damage by riot ===
Section 2 of the act provided:

(1) Where a house, shop, or building in [a police area] has been injured or destroyed, or the property therein has been injured, stolen, or destroyed, by any persons riotously and tumultuously assembled together, such compensation as hereinafter mentioned shall be paid out of [the police fund] of [the area] to any person who has sustained loss by such injury, stealing, or destruction; but in fixing the amount of such compensation regard shall be had to the conduct of the said person, whether as respects the precautions taken by him or as respects his being a party or accessory to such riotous or tumultuous assembly, or as regards any provocation offered to the persons assembled or otherwise.

(2) Where any person having sustained such loss as aforesaid has received, by way of insurance or otherwise, any sum to recoup him, in whole or in part, for such loss, the compensation otherwise payable to him under this Act shall, if exceeding such sum, be reduced by the amount thereof, and in any other case shall not be paid to him, and the payer of such sum shall be entitled to compensation under this Act in respect of the sum so paid in like manner as if he had sustained the said loss, and any policy of insurance given by such payer shall continue in force as if he had made no such payment, and where such person was recouped as aforesaid otherwise than by payment of a sum, this enactment shall apply as if the value of such recoupment were a sum paid.

Textual amendments

The references to a police area were substituted, for the previous references to a police district, by sections 103(1) and 104(1) of, and paragraph 9 of part II of schedule 7 to, the Police Act 1996.

The words "the police fund" were substituted for the words "the police rate" by section 103(3) of, and part I of schedule 9 to, the Police Act 1964, which came into force on 22 August 1996.

"House, shop or building", "police area" and "police fund"

These expressions are defined by section 9.

=== Section 3 - Mode of awarding compensation ===
Section 3 of the act provided:

(1) Claims for compensation under this Act shall be made to the [compensation authority] of the [police area] in which the injury, stealing, or destruction took place, and such [compensation authority] shall inquire into the truth thereof, and shall, if satisfied, fix such compensation as appears to them just.

(2) A Secretary of State may from time to time make, and when made, revoke and vary regulations respecting the time, manner, and conditions within, in, and under which claims for compensation under this Act are to be made, and all claims not made in accordance with such regulations may be excluded. Such regulations may also provide for the particulars to be stated in any claim, and for the verification of any claim, and of any facts incidental thereto, by statutory declarations, production of books, vouchers, and documents, entry of premises, and otherwise, and may also provide for any matter which under this Act can be prescribed, and for the [compensation authority] obtaining information and assistance for determining the said claims.

(3) The said regulations shall be published in the London Gazette, and every [compensation authority] shall cause the same to be published in their [police area], and copies thereof to be at all times sold to any applicant at a price not exceeding sixpence for each copy.

Textual amendments

The words "police area" were substituted for the references to a police district by sections 103(1) and 104(1) of, and paragraph 10 of part II of schedule 7 to, the Police Act 1996.

The words "compensation authority" were substituted for the words "police authority" by schedule 9 to the Police Act 1964.

"Police area" and "compensation authority"

These expressions are defined by section 9.

"Secretary of State"

This expression is defined by the Interpretation Act 1978.

"Sixpence"

The word "sixpence" in section 3(3) is to be read as referring to the sum of 2½p by virtue of section 10(1) of the Decimal Currency Act 1969.

Orders made under section 3(2)

- SR&O Rev. 1904, XI, "Riot, England", p. I., made on 30 June 1894, and revoked by article 13 of the next mentioned Order.
- Regulations under the Riot (Damages) Act 1886, as to claims for compensation (1921) (SR&O 1921/1536)
- The Riot (Damages) (Amendment) Regulations 1986 (SI 1986/76)
- The Riot (Damages) (Amendment) Regulations 2011 (SI 2011/2002)
- The Riot (Damages) (Amendment No. 2) Regulations 2011 (SI 2011/2009)

=== Section 4 - Right of action to person aggrieved ===
Section 4(1) of the act provided:

Where a claim to compensation has been made in accordance with the regulations, and the claimant is aggrieved by the refusal or failure of the [compensation authority] to fix compensation upon such claim, or by the amount of compensation fixed, he may bring an action against the [compensation authority] to recover compensation in respect of all or any of the matters mentioned in such claim and to an amount not exceeding that mentioned therein, but if in such action he fails to recover any compensation or an amount exceeding that fixed by the [compensation authority], he shall pay the costs of the police authority as between solicitor and client.

The words in square brackets were substituted by section 103(3) of, and part I of schedule 9 to, the Police Act 1964, which came into force on 22 August 1996.

=== Section 5 - Payment of compensation and expenses, and raising of money ===
==== Section 5(1) ====
Section 5(1) of the act provided:

Where any compensation under this Act has been fixed by or recovered in an action against the [compensation authority], that authority shall, on the prescribed conditions having been complied with, pay in the prescribed manner the amount of such compensation out of [the police fund, and shall also pay out of the said fund], all costs and expenses payable by them in or incidental to the execution of this Act;

The words in square brackets were substituted by section 103(3) of, and part I of schedule 9 to, the Police Act 1964, which came into force on 22 August 1996.

The words "and the amount required to meet the said payments (in this Act referred to as riot expenses), shall be raised as part of the police rate" at the end were repealed by section 103(3) of, and part I of schedule 9 to, the Police Act 1964, which came into force on 22 August 1996.

==== Sections 5(2) to (4) ====
Sections 5(2) and (4) of the act were repealed by section 103(3) of, and part I of schedule 9 to, the Police Act 1964, which came into force on 22 August 1996.

Section 5(3) of the act was repealed by schedule 30 to the Local Government Act 1972.

=== Section 6 - Application of the act to wreck and machinery ===
Section 6 of the act provided:

This Act shall apply -

(a) . . .
(b) in the case of the injury or destruction, by persons riotously and tumultuously assembled together, of any machinery, whether fixed or movable, prepared for or employed in any manufacture, or agriculture, or any branch thereof, or of any erection or fixture about or belonging to such machinery, or of any steam engine or other engine for sinking, draining, or working any mine or quarry, or of any staith or erection used in conducting the business of any mine or quarry, or of any bridge, waggon-way, or trunk for conveying minerals or other product from any mine or quarry;

in like manner as if such . . . injury or destruction were an injury, stealing, or destruction in respect of which compensation is payable under the foregoing provisions of this Act . . .

Section 6(a) of the act read: "in the case of the plundering, damage, or destruction of any ship or boat stranded or in distress on or near the shore of any sea or tidal water, or of any part of the cargo or apparel of such ship or boat, by persons riotously and tumultuously assembled together, whether on shore or afloat."

The words "plundering, damage" in the penultimate place, and the words "and as if, in the case of such ship, boat, or cargo not being in any police district, such plundering, damage, or destruction took place in the nearest police district" at the end, were repealed by the same Schedule.

=== Section 8 - Compensation for loss sustained before passing of Act ===
Section 8 of the act was repealed by section 103(3) of, and part I of schedule 9 to, the Police Act 1964, which came into force on 22 August 1996.

=== Section 9 - Definitions ===
Section 9 of the act the expressions "person", "police area", "police fund", "compensation authority", and "house, shop, or building".

=== Repealed enactments ===
Section 10(1) of the act repealed 3 enactments, listed in the second schedule to the act.

Citation	Short title	Description	Extent of repeal
7 & 8 Geo. 4. c. 31	Remedies Against the Hundred (England) Act 1827	An Act for consolidating and amending the laws in England relative to remedies against the hundred.	The whole act.
2 & 3 Will. 4. c. 72	Threshing Machines, Remedies for Damage Act 1832	An Act to extend the provisions of an Act of the seventh and eighth years of the reign of His late Majesty King George the Fourth relative to remedies against the hundred.	The whole act.
17 & 18 Vict. c. 104	Merchant Shipping Act 1854	The Merchant Shipping Act, 1854.	Section 477, from in England down to riotous assemblage, or as near thereto as circumstances permit, both inclusive.

=== Section 11 - Extent of act ===
Section 11 of the act provided:

This Act shall not extend to Scotland or Ireland.

In the United Kingdom, the reference to Ireland must now be construed as a reference to Northern Ireland.

== Subsequent developments ==
The definition of “Secretary of State” in section 9 of, and the preamble to, the act was repealed by section 1 of, and the first part of the schedule to, the Statute Law Revision Act 1898 (61 & 62 Vict. c. 22), which came into force on 25 July 1898.

Section 6(a) was repealed by section 745 of, and the twenty-second schedule to, the Merchant Shipping Act 1894 (57 & 58 Vict. c. 60), which came into force on 1 January 1895.

The definition of “borough”, in section 9 and section 10 of the act were repealed by section 1(1) of, and group 1 of part I of schedule 1 to, the Statute Law (Repeals) Act 1993, which came into force on 5 November 1993.

In 2002, Lord Bradshaw moved, and then withdrew, an amendment to the Police Reform Bill intended to repeal this Act, which he said was "widely viewed as archaic".

The whole act was repealed by section 10(1) of the Riot Compensation Act 2016, which came into force on 6 April 2017.

== See also ==
- Riot Acts
