= Justices of the Peace Act 1997 =

Act of the Parliament of the United Kingdom

Justices of the Peace Act 1997 (Note: Section 75(1).)
- Act of Parliament
- Parliament of the United Kingdom
- Long title: An Act to consolidate the Justices of the Peace Act 1979 and provisions of Part IV of the Police and Magistrates' Courts Act 1994.
- Citation: 1997 c. 25
- Territorial extent: England and Wales (Note: Section 75(5).)

Dates
- Royal assent: 19 March 1997
- Commencement: 19 June 1997 (Note: Section 74(1).)
- Repealed: 1 April 2005 (Note: The Courts Act 2003 (Commencement No. 10) Order 2005 (SI 2005/910).)

Other legislation
- Amends: Administration of Justice Act 1964; Criminal Justice Act 1972; Solicitors Act 1974; See § Repealed enactments
- Repeals/revokes: See § Repealed enactments
- Amended by: Powers of Criminal Courts (Sentencing) Act 2000
- Repealed by: Courts Act 2003

Status: Repealed

Text of statute as originally enacted

Revised text of statute as amended

The Justices of the Peace Act 1997 (c. 25) was an act of the Parliament of the United Kingdom that consolidated enactments relating to justices of the peace in England and Wales.

== Provisions ==
=== Repealed enactments ===
Section 73(3) of the act repealed 22 enactments and revoked 9 instruments, listed in parts I and II of schedule 6 to the act, respectively.

Part I — Repeals
Citation	Short title	Extent of repeal
1973 c. 15	Administration of Justice Act 1973	In Schedule 1, paragraph 3.
1979 c. 55	Justices of the Peace Act 1979	The whole act.
1980 c. 43	Magistrates' Courts Act 1980	In Schedule 7, paragraphs 55 and 191 to 197.
1982 c. 53	Administration of Justice Act 1982	Section 65.
1985 c. 51	Local Government Act 1985	Section 12.
1985 c. 51	Local Government Act 1985	Section 60(6).
1985 c. 51	Local Government Act 1985	In Schedule 14, paragraph 57.
1988 c. 4	Norfolk and Suffolk Broads Act 1988	In Schedule 6, paragraph 20.
1988 c. 33	Criminal Justice Act 1988	Section 164.
1988 c. 33	Criminal Justice Act 1988	In Schedule 15, paragraph 63.
1988 c. 41	Local Government Finance Act 1988	In Schedule 12, paragraph 2.
1988 c. 50	Housing Act 1988	In Schedule 17, paragraph 27.
1989 c. 41	Children Act 1989	In Schedule 11, paragraph 7.
1989 c. 43	Statute Law (Repeals) Act 1989	In Schedule 2, paragraph 3.
1990 c. 41	Courts and Legal Services Act 1990	Section 108.
1990 c. 41	Courts and Legal Services Act 1990	Section 117.
1990 c. 41	Courts and Legal Services Act 1990	In Schedule 10, paragraphs 44 and 45.
1991 c. 17	Maintenance Enforcement Act 1991	In Schedule 2, paragraph 4.
1991 c. 53	Criminal Justice Act 1991	Section 93(3) and (4).
1991 c. 53	Criminal Justice Act 1991	In section 99(1), the definition of "the 1979 Act".
1991 c. 53	Criminal Justice Act 1991	In Schedule 11, paragraph 40(2)(k).
1992 c. 14	Local Government Finance Act 1992	In Schedule 13, paragraph 48.
1993 c. 8	Judicial Pensions and Retirement Act 1993	In Schedule 6, paragraph 19.
1994 c. 19	Local Government (Wales) Act 1994	In Schedule 2, paragraph 10.
1994 c. 29	Police and Magistrates' Courts Act 1994	Sections 69 to 90 and 91(2) and (3).
1994 c. 29	Police and Magistrates' Courts Act 1994	In Schedule 4, paragraph 54.
1994 c. 29	Police and Magistrates' Courts Act 1994	Schedule 7.
1994 c. 29	Police and Magistrates' Courts Act 1994	In Schedule 8, Part I.
1995 c. 25	Environment Act 1995	In Schedule 10, paragraph 19.
1995 c. 26	Pensions Act 1995	In Schedule 5, paragraph 8.
1996 c. 16	Police Act 1996	In Schedule 7, paragraph 1(2)(o).
1996 c. 25	Criminal Procedure and Investigations Act 1996	Section 70.

Part II — Revocations
Citation	Short title	Extent of repeal
SI 1985/1383	Local Government (Magistrates' Courts etc.) Order 1985	In the Schedule, paragraph 3.
SI 1990/531	Justices of the Peace Act 1979 (Amendment) Order 1990	The whole order.
SI 1994/2594	Police and Magistrates' Courts Act 1994 (Commencement No. 3 and Transitional Provisions) Order 1994	The whole order.
SI 1995/42	Police and Magistrates' Courts Act 1994 (Commencement No. 6 and Transitional Provisions) Order 1995	The whole order.
SI 1995/685	Police and Magistrates' Courts Act 1994 (Commencement No. 8 and Transitional Provisions) Order 1995	The whole order.
SI 1996/674	Local Government Changes for England (Magistrates' Courts) Regulations 1996	In the Schedule, paragraphs 1 and 4(2).
SI 1996/675	Magistrates' Courts (Wales) (Consequences of Local Government Changes) Order 1996	In the Schedule, paragraph 1.
SI 1996/676	Commission Areas (Gwent, Mid Glamorgan and South Glamorgan) Order 1996	The whole order.
SI 1996/1924	Maximum Number of Stipendiary Magistrates Order 1996	The whole Order.

== Subsequent developments ==
The whole act was repealed by section 109(3) of, and schedule 10 to, the Courts Act 2003, which came into force on 1 April 2005. (Note: The Courts Act 2003 (Commencement No. 10) Order 2005 (SI 2005/910).)
