= List of acts of the Parliament of the United Kingdom from 2016 =

This is a list of acts of the Parliament of the United Kingdom passed in 2016.

Acts passed since 1963 are cited by calendar year, as opposed to the convention used for earlier acts of citing the regnal year(s) in which the relevant parliamentary session was held. Each act passed in a respective year is given a chapter number (abbreviated "c."), denoted by Arabic numerals in the case of public general acts, lowercase Roman numerals in the case of local acts, or italicised Arabic numerals in the case of personal acts. These run as separate series.

27 acts of Parliament were passed in 2016: 25 public general acts and 2 local acts.

indicates that an act has been transcribed on Wikisource, indicates that an act is available to view at legislation.gov.uk, and indicates the location of the original act in the Parliamentary Archives.

== Public general acts ==
Short title	Citation	Royal assent
Long title
Cities and Local Government Devolution Act 2016	2016 c. 1	28 January 2016
An Act to make provision for the election of mayors for the areas of, and for conferring additional functions on, combined authorities established under Part 6 of the Local Democracy, Economic Development and Construction Act 2009; (Note: Local Democracy, Economic Development and Construction Act 2009 (c. 20)) to make other provision in relation to bodies established under that Part; to make provision about local authority governance and functions; to confer power to establish, and to make provision about, sub-national transport bodies; and for connected purposes.
Psychoactive Substances Act 2016	2016 c. 2	28 January 2016
An Act to make provision about psychoactive substances; and for connected purposes.
Supply and Appropriation (Anticipation and Adjustments) Act 2016	2016 c. 3	16 March 2016
An Act to authorise the use of resources for the years ending with 31 March 2015, 31 March 2016 and 31 March 2017; to authorise the issue of sums out of the Consolidated Fund for those years; and to appropriate the supply authorised by this Act for the years ending with 31 March 2015 and 31 March 2016.
Charities (Protection and Social Investment) Act 2016	2016 c. 4	16 March 2016
An Act to amend the Charities Act 1992 (Note: Charities Act 1992 (c. 41)) and the Charities Act 2011. (Note: Charities Act 2011 (c. 25))
Childcare Act 2016	2016 c. 5	16 March 2016
An Act to make provision about free childcare for young children of working parents and about the publication of information about childcare and related matters by local authorities in England.
Education and Adoption Act 2016	2016 c. 6	16 March 2016
An Act to make provision about schools in England that are causing concern, including provision about their conversion into Academies and about intervention powers; and to make provision about joint arrangements for carrying out local authority adoption functions in England.
Welfare Reform and Work Act 2016	2016 c. 7	16 March 2016
An Act to make provision about reports on progress towards full employment and the apprenticeships target; to make provision about reports on the effect of certain support for troubled families; to make provision about life chances; to make provision about the benefit cap; to make provision about social security and tax credits; to make provision for loans for mortgage interest and other liabilities; and to make provision about social housing rents.
Riot Compensation Act 2016	2016 c. 8	23 March 2016
An Act to repeal the Riot (Damages) Act 1886 (Note: Riot (Damages) Act 1886 (49 & 50 Vict. c. 38)) and make provision about types of claims, procedures, decision-making and limits on awards payable in relation to a new compensation scheme for property damaged, destroyed or stolen in the course of riots.
Access to Medical Treatments (Innovation) Act 2016	2016 c. 9	23 March 2016
An Act to make provision for access to innovative medical treatments; and for connected purposes.
NHS (Charitable Trusts Etc) Act 2016	2016 c. 10	23 March 2016
An Act to make provision for, and in connection with, the removal of the Secretary of State's powers under the National Health Service Act 2006 (Note: National Health Service Act 2006 (c. 41)) to appoint trustees; to make provision transferring to Great Ormond Street Hospital Children's Charity the right to a royalty conferred by Schedule 6 to the Copyright, Designs and Patents Act 1988; (Note: Copyright, Designs and Patents Act 1988 (c. 48)) and for connected purposes.
Scotland Act 2016	2016 c. 11	23 March 2016
An Act to amend the Scotland Act 1998 (Note: Scotland Act 1998 (c. 46)) and make provision about the functions of the Scottish Ministers; and for connected purposes.
Enterprise Act 2016	2016 c. 12	4 May 2016
An Act to make provision relating to the promotion of enterprise and economic growth; provision about Sunday working; and provision restricting exit payments in relation to public sector employment.
Northern Ireland (Stormont Agreement and Implementation Plan) Act 2016	2016 c. 13	4 May 2016
An Act to make provision about the Independent Reporting Commission, extend the period for the appointment of Northern Ireland Ministers, modify the pledge made by Northern Ireland Ministers on taking office, provide for persons becoming Members of the Northern Ireland Assembly to give an undertaking, and make provision about the draft budget of the Northern Ireland Executive, in pursuance of the agreement made on 17 November 2015 called A Fresh Start: The Stormont Agreement and Implementation Plan.
Bank of England and Financial Services Act 2016	2016 c. 14	4 May 2016
An Act to make provision about the Bank of England; to make provision about the regulation of financial services; to make provision about the issue of banknotes; and for connected purposes.
Trade Union Act 2016	2016 c. 15	4 May 2016
An Act to make provision about industrial action, trade unions, employers' associations and the functions of the Certification Officer.
Driving Instructors (Registration) Act 2016	2016 c. 16	12 May 2016
An Act to make provision about the registration of driving instructors.
Criminal Cases Review Commission (Information) Act 2016	2016 c. 17	12 May 2016
An Act to extend the Criminal Cases Review Commission's powers to obtain information.
House of Commons Members' Fund Act 2016	2016 c. 18	12 May 2016
An Act to consolidate and amend provisions about the House of Commons Members' Fund.
Immigration Act 2016	2016 c. 19	12 May 2016
An Act to make provision about the law on immigration and asylum; to make provision about access to services, facilities, licences and work by reference to immigration status; to make provision about the enforcement of certain legislation relating to the labour market; to make provision about language requirements for public sector workers; to make provision about fees for passports and civil registration; and for connected purposes.
Energy Act 2016	2016 c. 20	12 May 2016
An Act to make provision about the Oil and Gas Authority and its functions; to make provision about rights to use upstream petroleum infrastructure; to make provision about the abandonment of offshore installations, submarine pipelines and upstream petroleum infrastructure; to extend Part 1A of the Petroleum Act 1998 (Note: Petroleum Act 1998 (c. 17)) to Northern Ireland; to make provision about the disclosure of information for the purposes of international agreements; to make provision about fees in respect of activities relating to oil, gas, carbon dioxide and pipelines; to make provision about wind power; and for connected purposes.
Armed Forces Act 2016	2016 c. 21	12 May 2016
An Act to continue the Armed Forces Act 2006; (Note: Armed Forces Act 2006 (c. 52)) to make provision about service discipline; to make provision about war pensions committees established under section 25 of the Social Security Act 1989; (Note: Social Security Act 1989 (c. 24)) to make provision about Ministry of Defence fire-fighters; and for connected purposes.
Housing and Planning Act 2016	2016 c. 22	12 May 2016
An Act to make provision about housing, estate agents, rentcharges, planning and compulsory purchase.
Supply and Appropriation (Main Estimates) Act 2016	2016 c. 23	20 July 2016
An Act to authorise the use of resources for the year ending with 31 March 2017; to authorise both the issue of sums out of the Consolidated Fund and the application of income for that year; and to appropriate the supply authorised for that year by this Act and by the Supply and Appropriation (Anticipation and Adjustments) Act 2016. (Note: Supply and Appropriation (Anticipation and Adjustments) Act 2016 (c. 3))
Finance Act 2016	2016 c. 24	15 September 2016
An Act to grant certain duties, to alter other duties, and to amend the law relating to the National Debt and the Public Revenue, and to make further provision in connection with finance.
Investigatory Powers Act 2016	2016 c. 25	29 November 2016
An Act to make provision about the interception of communications, equipment interference and the acquisition and retention of communications data, bulk personal datasets and other information; to make provision about the treatment of material held as a result of such interception, equipment interference or acquisition or retention; to establish the Investigatory Powers Commissioner and other Judicial Commissioners and make provision about them and other oversight arrangements; to make further provision about investigatory powers and national security; to amend sections 3 and 5 of the Intelligence Services Act 1994; (Note: Intelligence Services Act 1994 (c. 13)) and for connected purposes.

== Local acts ==
Short title	Citation	Royal assent
Long title
Transport for London Act 2016	2016 c. i	4 May 2016
An Act to confer further powers upon Transport for London; and for related purposes.
Haberdashers' Aske's Charity Act 2016	2016 c. ii	15 September 2016
An Act to make provision regarding the identity of the corporators of the Aske Corporation and the status of the Corporation; to provide for property held on trust by the Corporation to be subject to the same legal controls as apply generally to charity property; to make formal provision for internal procedures; and for related purposes.

== See also ==
- List of acts of the Parliament of the United Kingdom
