= Assaulting a constable in the execution of his duty =

Statutory offence

Assaulting a constable in the execution of his duty is a statutory offence of aggravated assault in England and Wales, Scotland, Northern Ireland, and Hong Kong.

== England and Wales ==
Section 89(1) of the Police Act 1996 provides:

Any person who assaults a constable in the execution of his duty, or a person assisting a constable in the execution of his duty, shall be guilty of an offence and liable on summary conviction to imprisonment for a term not exceeding six months or to a fine not exceeding level 5 on the standard scale, or to both.

It is a summary offence. The "starting sentence" is a short custodial sentence, and it is considered a more serious offence than common assault.

The constable must be acting "in the execution of his duty" for this offence to be made out. If he exceeds the remit of his duty (e.g. acts unlawfully in assaulting the defendant), the offence will not be made out.

The defendant does not actually have to be aware that the person he is assaulting is a constable.

The fact that the victim is a police officer is not, in itself, an aggravating factor which would justify more serious charge. The criteria for a charge under section 47 of the Offences Against the Person Act 1861 do not distinguish between members of the public and police officers as the victim.

According to R (Fullard) v Woking Magistrates' Court, a constable cannot be acting in the execution of their duty when unlawfully on private property. Thus, if the officer is not acting under the authority of a warrant, acting under a statutory or common law power of entry, or in hot pursuit, the person lawfully in possession of land is entitled to withdraw permission for the officer to remain. Should the officer refuse to leave, the officer will cease to be "acting in the execution of their duty". To make an effective withdrawal of permission, clear words must be used. Merely directing offensive remarks at the officer which amount to 'go away' will not necessarily withdraw any implied permission to enter or remain. Further, when properly required to leave, the officer must be allowed a reasonable opportunity to leave. However, once the opportunity to leave voluntarily has passed, it will not be an assault for the land owner to use reasonable force to cause the officer to leave.

For the purposes of section 89 of the Police Act 1996, any person who is carrying out surveillance in England and Wales under section 76A of the Regulation of Investigatory Powers Act 2000 is to be treated as if he were acting as a constable in the execution of his duty.

== Scotland ==
Section 90 of the Police and Fire Reform (Scotland) Act 2012 provides that it is an offence for a person to, amongst other things, assault a constable in the execution of his duty or a person assisting a constable in the execution of his duty.

== Northern Ireland ==
Section 66(1) of the Police (Northern Ireland) Act 1998 (c. 32) now provides that it is an offence for a person to, amongst other things, assault a constable in the execution of his duty, or a person assisting a constable in the execution of his duty.

=== History ===
The offence of 'assault on a constable in the execution of his duty' was formerly created section 7(1)(a) of the Criminal Justice (Miscellaneous Provisions) Act (Northern Ireland) 1968.

== Hong Kong ==
In Hong Kong this can be a summary offence, and also prosecutable under the Police Force Ordinance or the Offences Against the Person Ordinance.

== See also ==
- Assaults on Emergency Workers (Offences) Act 2018
