= Administration of Justice Act 1964 =

Act of the Parliament of the United Kingdom

Administration of Justice Act 1964 (Note: Section 41(1).)
- Act of Parliament
- Parliament of the United Kingdom
- Long title: An Act to make provision with respect to the administration of justice in the metropolitan area; to provide for a lieutenant and deputy lieutenants for Greater London; to make fresh provision with respect to the indemnification of justices and their clerks, recorders and clerks of the peace; to make minor amendments of the law relating to the administration of justice in England and Wales and an amendment of section 8 of the Justices of the Peace Act 1949 extending to Scotland; and for connected purposes.
- Citation: 1964 c. 42
- Territorial extent: England and Wales (Note: Section 41(6)–(7).)

Dates
- Royal assent: 10 June 1964
- Commencement: 1 July 1964 (Note: Section 41(2). The Administration of Justice Act 1964 (Commencement No. 1) Order 1964 (SI 1964/864).); 1 January 1965 (Note: Section 41(2). The Administration of Justice Act 1964 (Commencement No. 2) Order 1964 (SI 1964/1435).); 1 April 1965
Other legislation
Amends	Metropolitan Police Act 1839
Amended by	General Rate Act 1967; Criminal Justice Act 1967; Superannuation (Miscellaneous Provisions) Act 1967; Criminal Law Act 1967; Justices of the Peace Act 1968; Courts Act 1971; Local Government Act 1972; Criminal Justice Act 1972; Powers of Criminal Courts Act 1973; Administration of Justice Act 1973; Statute Law (Repeals) Act 1974; Consumer Credit Act 1974; Statute Law (Repeals) Act 1975; House of Commons Disqualification Act 1975; Domestic Proceedings and Magistrates' Courts Act 1978; Statute Law (Repeals) Act 1978; Justices of the Peace Act 1979; Magistrates' Courts Act 1980; Reserve Forces Act 1980; Local Government Act 1985; Children Act 1989; Criminal Justice Act 1991; Police and Magistrates' Courts Act 1994; Lieutenancies Act 1997; Justices of the Peace Act 1997; Access to Justice Act 1999; Greater London Authority Act 1999; Courts Act 2003; Licensing Act 2003; Courts Act 2003; Statute Law (Repeals) Act 2004; Constitutional Reform Act 2005; Crime and Courts Act 2013
Relates to	London Government Act 1963

Status: Amended

Text of statute as originally enacted

Revised text of statute as amended

Text of the Administration of Justice Act 1964 as in force today (including any amendments) within the United Kingdom, from legislation.gov.uk.

The Administration of Justice Act 1964 (c. 42) is an act of the Parliament of the United Kingdom that reorganised the judicial arrangements in the Greater London area to reflect major local government changes. Among the provisions of the act, which came into force on 1 April 1965, were the creation of the offices of Lord Lieutenant of Greater London and High Sheriff of Greater London.

== Provisions ==
=== Repealed enactments ===
Section 41(8) of the act repealed 50 enactments, listed in the fifth schedule to the act.

Citation	Short title	Extent of repeal
6 Geo. 4. c. 50	Juries Act 1825	In section 42, the words from the beginning to " so served; and ", where first occurring.
4 & 5 Will. 4. c. 36	Central Criminal Court Act 1834	The whole act.
2 & 3 Vict. c. 71	Metropolitan Police Courts Act 1839	Sections 1 to 18.
2 & 3 Vict. c. 71	Metropolitan Police Courts Act 1839	Sections 43. 49. 50 and 56.
3 & 4 Vict. c. 84	Metropolitan Police Courts Act 1840	The whole act except sections 6, 11 and 13.
3 & 4 Vict. c. 84	Metropolitan Police Courts Act 1840	In section 6, the proviso.
6 & 7 Vict. c. xliv	Merthyr Tydfil Justices of the Peace Act 1843	In section 5, the words from " but such person " to " qualification ".
8 & 9 Vict. c. 18	Lands Clauses Consolidation Act 1845	Section 148 as originally enacted or as incorporated in any other enactment.
11 & 12 Vict. c. 42	Indictable Offences Act 1848	Section 31.
15 & 16 Vict. c. 76	Common Law Procedure Act 1852	Sections 112 and 113.
21 & 22 Vict. c. 73	Stipendiary Magistrates Act 1858	Sections 4 and 6.
22 & 23 Vict. c. 4	Middlesex Sessions Act 1859	The whole act.
32 & 33 Vict. c. 18	Lands Clauses Consolidation Act 1869	The whole act as originally enacted or as incorporated in any other enactment.
33 & 34 Vict. c. 52	Extradition Act 1870	In section 10, the words from " to the Middlesex " to " Middlesex ".
41 & 42 Vict. c. lv	Manchester Division and Borough of Salford (Stipendiary Justices) Act 1878	Section 7.
44 & 45 Vict. c. 64	Central Criminal Court (Prisons) Act 1881	Section 1, from the first " and " onwards.
44 & 45 Vict. c. 64	Central Criminal Court (Prisons) Act 1881	Section 2(1) to (4).
44 & 45 Vict. c. 64	Central Criminal Court (Prisons) Act 1881	In section 3, the words from the beginning to " Central Criminal Court district".
45 & 46 Vict. c. 50	Municipal Corporations Act 1882	In section 163(4), the words " or as a justice ".
51 & 52 Vict. c. 41	Local Government Act 1888	In section 3(iv), the words from " subject" to the end of the paragraph.
51 & 52 Vict. c. 41	Local Government Act 1888	Section 30, except so far as relating to the police.
51 & 52 Vict. c. 41	Local Government Act 1888	Section 40.
51 & 52 Vict. c. 41	Local Government Act 1888	Section 41(5).
51 & 52 Vict. c. 41	Local Government Act 1888	Section 42(1) to (7) and in section 42(12) the word " Middlesex ".
51 & 52 Vict. c. 41	Local Government Act 1888	Section 46(6).
51 & 52 Vict. c. 41	Local Government Act 1888	Section 64(3) and (4).
51 & 52 Vict. c. 41	Local Government Act 1888	Section 66, except so far as relating to police officers and constables.
51 & 52 Vict. c. 41	Local Government Act 1888	Section 83(1), (2), (3), (5) and (11).
51 & 52 Vict. c. 41	Local Government Act 1888	Section 89.
51 & 52 Vict. c. 41	Local Government Act 1888	Section 91.
51 & 52 Vict. c. 41	Local Government Act 1888	Section 95(1).
51 & 52 Vict. c. 41	Local Government Act 1888	In section 100, the definition of " metropolis ".
51 & 52 Vict. c. 41	Local Government Act 1888	Section 115.
58 & 59 Vict. c. cxxvii	London County Council (General Powers) Act 1895	Section 43.
59 & 60 Vict. c. 55	Quarter Sessions (London) Act 1896	The whole act.
60 & 61 Vict. c. 14	Metropolitan Police Courts (Holidays) Act 1897	The whole act.
60 & 61 Vict. c. 26	Metropolitan Police Courts Act 1897	Section 2.
60 & 61 Vict. c. 26	Metropolitan Police Courts Act 1897	Section 3(2).
60 & 61 Vict. c. 26	Metropolitan Police Courts Act 1897	Section 5.
12 & 13 Geo. 5. c. 11	Juries Act 1922	In section 7, in the definition of " clerk of the county council", the words from " and " to " peace ".
15 & 16 Geo. 5. c. 49	Supreme Court of Judicature (Consolidation) Act 1925	Sections 73 and 74.
16 & 17 Geo. 5. c. xcviii	London County Council (General Powers') Act 1926	Section 35.
20 & 21 Geo. 5. c. clix	London County Council (General Powers) Act 1930	Part IV.
21 & 22 Geo. 5. c. 45	Local Government (Clerks) Act 1931	In section 3(3), the words from " and in the enactments " to " this Act".
21 & 22 Geo. 5. c. 45	Local Government (Clerks) Act 1931	Section 12.
21 & 22 Geo. 5. c. 45	Local Government (Clerks) Act 1931	Section 13(1)(b).
21 & 22 Geo. 5. c. 45	Local Government (Clerks) Act 1931	Section 14.
21 & 22 Geo. 5. c. 45	Local Government (Clerks) Act 1931	Section 16.
21 & 22 Geo. 5. c. 45	Local Government (Clerks) Act 1931	Schedule 3.
21 & 22 Geo. 5. c. lix	London County Council (General Powers) Act 1931	Section 47.
23 & 24 Geo. 5. c. 38	Summary Jurisdiction (Appeals) Act 1933	Section 8.
23 & 24 Geo. 5. c. 51	Local Government Act 1933	In section 3(5), the words from " but " to the end of the subsection.
23 & 24 Geo. 5. c. 51	Local Government Act 1933	In section 18(7), the words from " but " to the end of the subsection.
23 & 24 Geo. 5. c. 51	Local Government Act 1933	In section 18(8), the words from " but " to the end of the subsection.
23 & 24 Geo. 5. c. 51	Local Government Act 1933	In section 33(5), the words from " but " to the end of the subsection.
1 Edw. 8 & 1 Geo. 6. c. 12	Firearms Act 1937	In Schedule 1, paragraph 9.
1 Edw. 8 & 1 Geo. 6. c. xlv	City of London (Various Powers) Act 1937	Section 36.
1 & 2 Geo. 6. c. 63	Administration of Justice (Miscellaneous Provisions) Act 1938	In section 1(3), the words from " but " to the end of the subsection.
1 & 2 Geo. 6. c. 63	Administration of Justice (Miscellaneous Provisions) Act 1938	Section 2(2)(c) and (e).
1 & 2 Geo. 6. c. 63	Administration of Justice (Miscellaneous Provisions) Act 1938	In section 4(3), the words " the provisions of section ninety of the Middlesex Council Act 1934, and ", " respectively ", " of the said section ninety or ", and " as the case may be " and the proviso.
7 & 8 Geo. 6. c. xxi	Middlesex County Council Act 1944	Section 395(2) and (3).
7 & 8 Geo. 6. c. xxi	Middlesex County Council Act 1944	Section 399(2).
10 & 11 Geo. 6. c. xlvi	London County Council (General Powers) Act 1947	Section 58.
11 & 12 Geo. 6. c. 26	Local Government Act 1948	Section 121(9).
11 & 12 Geo. 6. c. 58	Criminal Justice Act 1948	In section 45(2), the words " (b) a division of the metropolitan police court area ".
11 & 12 Geo. 6. c. 58	Criminal Justice Act 1948	In section 80(1), the definition of " metropolitan police court area ".
11 & 12 Geo. 6. c. 58	Criminal Justice Act 1948	In Schedule 5, in paragraph 2(3), the words " possessing such qualifications as may be prescribed ", and paragraph 7(1).
11 & 12 Geo. 6. c. liii	London County Council (General Powers) Act 1948	Section 49.
12, 13 & 14 Geo. 6. c. 101	Justices of the Peace Act 1949	In section 3(1), the words " the London Government Act 1939 ".
12, 13 & 14 Geo. 6. c. 101	Justices of the Peace Act 1949	Section 10(2) from " except " onwards.
12, 13 & 14 Geo. 6. c. 101	Justices of the Peace Act 1949	Section 11(9) to (11).
12, 13 & 14 Geo. 6. c. 101	Justices of the Peace Act 1949	In section 21(7), the words " a clerk to a metropolitan stipendiary court ".
12, 13 & 14 Geo. 6. c. 101	Justices of the Peace Act 1949	Section 24.
12, 13 & 14 Geo. 6. c. 101	Justices of the Peace Act 1949	In section 25(2), the words from " or by " in paragraph (c) to the end of the subsection.
12, 13 & 14 Geo. 6. c. 101	Justices of the Peace Act 1949	In section 26(3), the words " or under paragraph (d) of subsection (2) of the last foregoing section ".
12, 13 & 14 Geo. 6. c. 101	Justices of the Peace Act 1949	In section 27(10)(c), the words " a clerk to a metropolitan stipendiary court ".
12, 13 & 14 Geo. 6. c. 101	Justices of the Peace Act 1949	Section 31(2).
12, 13 & 14 Geo. 6. c. 101	Justices of the Peace Act 1949	Section 36(5).
12, 13 & 14 Geo. 6. c. 101	Justices of the Peace Act 1949	In section 39(1), the words from " and any " to " 1888 ".
12, 13 & 14 Geo. 6. c. 101	Justices of the Peace Act 1949	Section 39(4).
12, 13 & 14 Geo. 6. c. 101	Justices of the Peace Act 1949	In section 44(1), in the definition of " county justice " the words " in relation to the county of London ".
15 & 16 Geo. 6 and 1 Eliz. 2. c. 55	Magistrates' Courts Act 1952	In section 119, subsections (1) to (7) and (9).
15 & 16 Geo. 6 and 1 Eliz. 2. c. 55	Magistrates' Courts Act 1952	Section 120(2).
15 & 16 Geo. 6 and 1 Eliz. 2. c. 55	Magistrates' Courts Act 1952	In section 121(1), paragraph (b) and in paragraph (c), the word " Other "; and in section 121(2) the words " or subsection (4) of section one hundred and nineteen ".
15 & 16 Geo. 6 and 1 Eliz. 2. c. 55	Magistrates' Courts Act 1952	In section 126(1), the definition of " County of London ".
15 & 16 Geo. 6 and 1 Eliz. 2. c. viii	London County Council (General Powers) Act 1952	Sections 23 and 24.
4 & 5 Eliz. 2. c. 34	Criminal Justice Administration Act 1956	In section 4(2), the words from " but " to the end of the subsection.
4 & 5 Eliz. 2. c. 34	Criminal Justice Administration Act 1956	In section 13, subsection (3), and in subsection (4), the word " also ".
4 & 5 Eliz. 2. c. 34	Criminal Justice Administration Act 1956	Section 18.
5 & 6 Eliz. 2. c. 20	House of Commons Disqualification Act 1957	In Part I of Schedule 1, both in its application to the House of Commons of the Parliament of the United Kingdom and in its application to the Senate and House of Commons of Northern Ireland, in the entry relating to the judges of the Mayor's and City of London Court, the words " or Additional ".
5 & 6 Eliz. 2. c. 20	House of Commons Disqualification Act 1957	In Part III of Schedule 1, in its application to the House of Commons of the Parliament of the United Kingdom, the entry relating to clerks and other officers and servants of a metropolitan magistrates' court.
7 & 8 Eliz. 2. c. 45	Metropolitan Magistrates' Courts Act 1959	Section 1.
7 & 8 Eliz. 2. c. 72	Mental Health Act 1959	Section 80(6).
9 & 10 Eliz. 2. c. 43	Public Authorities (Allowances) Act 1961	In section 7(1)(b), the words from " or of a committee " to " that Act ".
10 & 11 Eliz. 2. c. 15	Criminal Justice Administration Act 1962	In section 4, the words " other than the county of London " wherever occurring.
10 & 11 Eliz. 2. c. 15	Criminal Justice Administration Act 1962	Section 6.
10 & 11 Eliz. 2. c. 15	Criminal Justice Administration Act 1962	In section 9, the words from " and is " to " Sessions ".
10 & 11 Eliz. 2. c. 15	Criminal Justice Administration Act 1962	Section 11(1).
10 & 11 Eliz. 2. c. 15	Criminal Justice Administration Act 1962	In Part I of Schedule 4, the amendments of the Metropolitan Police Courts Act 1839, the Local Government Act 1888, the Quarter Sessions (London) Act 1896 and the Middlesex County Council Act 1944.
1963 c. 2	Betting, Gaming and Lotteries Act 1963	Section 55(3).
1963 c. 33	London Government Act 1963	Section 84(6).
1963 c. 33	London Government Act 1963	In Schedule 2, paragraph 1(2)(a).
1963 c. 33	London Government Act 1963	In Schedule 4, in paragraph 5, the words from " and in " to " onwards ".
1963 c. 37	Children and Young Persons Act 1963	Section 20.
1963 c. 37	Children and Young Persons Act 1963	In Schedule 2, paragraph 19.
1963 c. 37	Children and Young Persons Act 1963	In Schedule 3, paragraph 47.
1964 c. 26	Licensing Act 1964	Section 57(2).
1964 c. 26	Licensing Act 1964	In section 60(2), the words " wholly or partly ".
1964 c. 26	Licensing Act 1964	In section 60(3), the words " wholly or partly ".
1964 c. 26	Licensing Act 1964	Section 201(3).
1964 c. iv	City of London (Courts) Act 1964	Section 8(2).

== Subsequent developments ==
Sections 40(1) and 41(8) of, and schedule 5 to, the act, together with paragraphs 9, 19(3), 20(5) and 23(2) of schedule 3, were repealed by section 1 of, and part XI of the schedule to, the Statute Law (Repeals) Act 1974, which came into force on 27 June 1974.
