= Police Act 1996 =

Act of the Parliament of the United Kingdom

Police Act 1996 (Note: Section 106.)
- Act of Parliament
- Parliament of the United Kingdom
- Long title: An Act to consolidate the Police Act 1964, Part IX of the Police and Criminal Evidence Act 1984, Chapter I of Part I of the Police and Magistrates' Courts Act 1994 and certain other enactments relating to the police.
- Citation: 1996 c. 16
- Territorial extent: England and Wales; Scotland; Northern Ireland; (Note: Section 105.)

Dates
- Royal assent: 22 May 1996
- Commencement: 22 August 1996 (Note: Section 104.)
Other legislation
Amends	Town Police Clauses Act 1847; Parks Regulation Act 1872; Local Government Act 1966; Pensions (Increase) Act 1971; House of Commons Disqualification Act 1975; Police Pensions Act 1976; Police and Criminal Evidence Act 1984; Housing Associations Act 1985; Town and Country Planning Act 1990; Police and Magistrates' Courts Act 1994
Repeals/revokes	Police Act 1964
Amended by	List: Justices of the Peace Act 1997; Police Act 1997; West Mercia (Police Area and Authority) Order 1997; Cheshire (Police Area and Authority) Order 1997; Cambridgeshire (Police Area and Authority) Order 1997; Essex (Police Area and Authority) Order 1997; Devon and Cornwall (Police Area and Authority) Order 1997; Nottinghamshire (Police Area and Authority) Order 1997; Lancashire (Police Area and Authority) Order 1997; Kent (Police Area and Authority) Order 1997; Audit Commission Act 1998; Police (Northern Ireland) Act 1998; Local Government Act 1999; Greater London Authority Act 1999; Scotland Act 1998 (Cross-Border Public Authorities) (Adaptation of Functions etc.) Order 1999; Scotland Act 1998 (Consequential Modifications) (No.2) Order 1999; Postal Services Act 2000; Anti-terrorism, Crime and Security Act 2001; International Development Act 2002; Proceeds of Crime Act 2002; Police Reform Act 2002; Railways and Transport Safety Act 2003; Local Government Act 2003; Courts Act 2003; Criminal Justice Act 2003; Energy Act 2004; British Transport Police (Transitional and Consequential Provisions) Order 2004; Insolvency Act 2000 (Company Directors Disqualification Undertakings) Order 2004; Inquiries Act 2005; Serious Organised Crime and Police Act 2005; Police, Public Order and Criminal Justice (Scotland) Act 2006; Safeguarding Vulnerable Groups Act 2006; Police and Justice Act 2006; Tribunals, Courts and Enforcement Act 2007; Serious Crime Act 2007; Local Government and Public Involvement in Health Act 2007; Legal Services Act 2007; Police, Public Order and Criminal Justice (Scotland) Act 2006 (Modification of Agency's Powers and Incidental Provision) Order 2007; Police, Public Order and Criminal Justice (Scotland) Act 2006 (Consequential Provisions and Modifications) Order 2007; Criminal Justice and Immigration Act 2008; Health and Social Care Act 2008; Offender Management Act 2007 (Consequential Amendments) Order 2008; Policing and Crime Act 2009; Local Government (Structural Changes) (Areas and Membership of Public Bodies in Bedfordshire and Cheshire) Order 2009; Northern Ireland Act 1998 (Devolution of Policing and Justice Functions) Order 2010; Police Reform and Social Responsibility Act 2011; Localism Act 2011; Police and Fire Reform (Scotland) Act 2012; Protection of Freedoms Act 2012; Treaty of Lisbon (Changes in Terminology or Numbering) Order 2012; Public Bodies (Abolition of Her Majesty's Inspectorate of Courts Administration and the Public Guardian Board) Order 2012; Police (Descriptions of Service) Order 2012; Protection of Freedoms Act 2012 (Disclosure and Barring Service Transfer of Functions) Order 2012; Crime and Courts Act 2013; Public Service Pensions Act 2013; Police and Fire Reform (Scotland) Act 2012 (Consequential Modifications and Savings) Order 2013; Police and Fire Reform (Scotland) Act 2012 (Consequential Provisions and Modifications) Order 2013; Local Audit and Accountability Act 2014; Anti-social Behaviour, Crime and Policing Act 2014; Cities and Local Government Devolution Act 2016; Riot Compensation Act 2016; Enterprise and Regulatory Reform Act 2013 (Consequential Amendments) (Bankruptcy) and the Small Business, Enterprise and Employment Act 2015 (Consequential Amendments) Regulations 2016; Policing and Crime Act 2017; Police Federation (England and Wales) Regulations 2017; Policing and Crime Act 2017 (Consequential Amendments) Regulations 2018; Law Enforcement and Security (Amendment) (EU Exit) Regulations 2019; Armed Forces Act 2021; Police, Crime, Sentencing and Courts Act 2022; Police Act 1996 (Amendment and Consequential Amendments) Regulations 2022; Victims and Prisoners Act 2024; Crime and Policing Act 2026; English Devolution and Community Empowerment Act 2026

Status: Partially repealed

Text of statute as originally enacted

Text of the Police Act 1996 as in force today (including any amendments) within the United Kingdom, from legislation.gov.uk.

The Police Act 1996 (c. 16) is an act of the Parliament of the United Kingdom which defined the current police areas in England and Wales, constituted police authorities for those areas, and set out the relationship between the Home Secretary and the English and Welsh territorial police forces. It replaced the Police and Magistrates' Courts Act 1994, which in turn had replaced the Police Act 1964 (c. 48).

== Contents ==
=== Part I Organisation of Police Forces ===
Sections 1 to 35 concern the national and regional organisation of the police force, with slightly differently applicable rules inside and outside London. The National Police Chiefs' Council is regulated under Section 22a.

=== Part II Central Supervision, Direction and Facilities ===
Sections 36 to 58 concern the functions of the Secretary of State in setting the police forces' objectives, handling budgets, and making more detailed regulations.

=== Part III Police Representative Institutions ===
Sections 59 to 64 concern the Police Federation of England and Wales and related rules. Section 64 contains the prohibition, in place since the Police Act 1919 (9 & 10 Geo. 5. c. 46), on police becoming members of a trade union which can take strike action, under the Trade Union and Labour Relations (Consolidation) Act 1992. The Police Federation was thought to be a substitute, given the potential for civil unrest that might develop if police stopped working to go on strike. This was thought to make the police exceptional, and as an alternative, a system of arbitration to resolve workplace disputes was instituted. The constitution of the Police Federation is set out in the amended Police Federation Regulations 1969 (SI 1969/1787).

=== Part IV Complaints, disciplinary proceedings etc. ===
Sections 65 to 88 concern the rules of the Police Complaints Authority, handling complaints made against the police, and procedures for disciplinary hearings and dismissal of officers.

=== Part V Miscellaneous and General ===
Section 89(1) creates the offence of assaulting a constable in the execution of his duty. Subsequently, the Assaults on Emergency Workers (Offences) Act 2018 increased the maximum sentence on summary conviction to 12 months.

==== Repealed enactments ====
Section 103(3) of the act repealed 19 enactments and revoked 14 instruments, listed in parts I and II, and part III of schedule 9 to the act, respectively.

Part I — Repeals: general
Citation	Short title	Extent of repeal
23 Geo. 5. c. 12	Children and Young Persons Act 1933	In section 107(1), in the definition of "Chief officer of police" the words "as regards England has the same meaning as in the Police Act 1964,".
1964 c. 48	Police Act 1964	The whole act (except sections 37 and 60 to 65, Schedule 5 and the provisions of Schedule 9 other than the entry relating to the Children and Young Persons Act 1933).
1967 c. 77	Police (Scotland) Act 1967	In Schedule 4, the paragraphs under the heading "The Police Act 1964".
1971 c. 56	Pensions (Increase) Act 1971	In Schedule 2, in paragraph 51 the words "other than a local authority".
1972 c. 39	Police Act 1972	The whole act.
1972 c. 70	Local Government Act 1972	Section 196.
1976 c. 35	Police Pensions Act 1976	In Schedule 2, paragraph 5.
1977 c. 45	Criminal Law Act 1977	In Schedule 1, paragraph 18. In Schedule 6, the entry headed "Police Act 1964".
1980 c. 10	Police Negotiating Board Act 1980	The whole act.
1982 c. 48	Criminal Justice Act 1982	In Schedule 3, the entry headed "the Police Act 1964".
1984 c. 60	Police and Criminal Evidence Act 1984	In section 64(6B), the definition of "chief officer of police" and the word "and" immediately after it. Sections 106, 109 and 112.
1988 c. 41	Local Government Finance Act 1988	Sections 64(7)(e) and (f) and 144(4).
1989 c. 11	Police Officers (Central Service) Act 1989	Sections 1 and 3. The Schedule.
1994 c. 29	Police and Magistrates' Courts Act 1994	Sections 1 to 26, 28, 29, 32, 34 to 38, 45 and 95.
1994 c. 29	Police and Magistrates' Courts Act 1994	Schedules 1 to 3.
1994 c. 29	Police and Magistrates' Courts Act 1994	In Schedule 4, paragraph 6.
1994 c. 29	Police and Magistrates' Courts Act 1994	In Schedule 5, paragraphs 1 to 16, 21, 22, 24(b), 25 to 28, 31 to 34, 39(a) and 40(2).
1994 c. 29	Police and Magistrates' Courts Act 1994	In Schedule 9, in Part I, the entries relating to sections 53(1), 60(1) and 60(2) of the Police Act 1964.
1994 c. 29	Police and Magistrates' Courts Act 1994	In Schedule 9, in Part I, the entries relating to the Police and Criminal Evidence Act 1984 (except for the entries relating to section 108 of, and Schedules 4 and 6 to, that Act).
1994 c. 29	Police and Magistrates' Courts Act 1994	In Schedule 9, in Part I, the entry relating to the Courts and Legal Services Act 1990.
1994 c. 33	Criminal Justice and Public Order Act 1994	Section 141.
1994 c. 33	Criminal Justice and Public Order Act 1994	Section 160(1).
1994 c. 33	Criminal Justice and Public Order Act 1994	In Schedule 10, paragraphs 13, 14, 17 and 27.

Part II — Repeals consequential on new discipline and complaints procedures
Citation	Short title	Extent of repeal
1964 c. 48	Police Act 1964	Section 37.
1964 c. 48	Police Act 1964	Sections 60 to 62.
1964 c. 48	Police Act 1964	Section 64 (except subsection (2)).
1964 c. 48	Police Act 1964	Section 65(2) to (4).
1964 c. 48	Police Act 1964	Schedule 5.
1984 c. 60	Police and Criminal Evidence Act 1984	Section 67(8).
1984 c. 60	Police and Criminal Evidence Act 1984	Sections 83 to 105.
1984 c. 60	Police and Criminal Evidence Act 1984	Schedule 4.
1990 c. 41	Courts and Legal Services Act 1990	In Schedule 10, paragraph 22.
1994 c. 29	Police and Magistrates' Courts Act 1994	In Schedule 5, in paragraph 24 the opening words and sub-paragraph (a).
1994 c. 29	Police and Magistrates' Courts Act 1994	In Schedule 5, paragraphs 29, 30 and 36.

Part III — Revocations
Citation	Title	Extent of revocation
SI 1995/493	Avon (Structural Change) Order 1995	Article 13.
SI 1995/600	Humberside (Structural Change) Order 1995	Article 11.
SI 1995/610	North Yorkshire (District of York) (Structural and Boundary Changes) Order 1995	Article 12.
SI 1995/1747	Cleveland (Further Provision) Order 1995	Article 4.
SI 1995/1769	Buckinghamshire (Borough of Milton Keynes) (Structural Change) Order 1995	Article 5.
SI 1995/1770	East Sussex (Boroughs of Brighton and Hove) (Structural Change) Order 1995	Article 7.
SI 1995/1771	Dorset (Boroughs of Poole and Bournemouth) (Structural Change) Order 1995	Article 5.
SI 1995/1772	Durham (Borough of Darlington) (Structural Change) Order 1995	Article 5.
SI 1995/1773	Derbyshire (City of Derby) (Structural Change) Order 1995	Article 5.
SI 1995/1774	Wiltshire (Borough of Thamesdown) (Structural Change) Order 1995	Article 5.
SI 1995/1775	Hampshire (Cities of Portsmouth and Southampton) (Structural Change) Order 1995	Article 5.
SI 1995/1776	Bedfordshire (Borough of Luton) (Structural Change) Order 1995	Article 5.
SI 1995/1779	Staffordshire (City of Stoke-on-Trent) (Structural and Boundary Changes) Order 1995	Article 7.
SI 1996/507	Leicestershire (City of Leicester and District of Rutland) (Structural Change) Order 1996	Article 5.

== See also ==
- UK labour law
- Police Act
