= Police Pensions Act 1976 =

Act of the Parliament of the United Kingdom

Police Pensions Act 1976 (Note: Section 14(1).)
- Act of Parliament
- Parliament of the United Kingdom
- Long title: An Act to consolidate the Police Pensions Act 1948 and certain other enactments relating to the pensions to be paid to and in respect of members of police forces.
- Citation: 1976 c. 35
- Territorial extent: England and Wales; Scotland; (Note: Section 14(2).)

Dates
- Royal assent: 22 July 1976
- Commencement: 22 July 1976 (Note: The Acts of Parliament (Commencement) Act 1793.)

Other legislation
- Amends: See § Repealed enactments
- Repeals/revokes: See § Repealed enactments
- Amended by: Interpretation Act 1978; Police Negotiating Board Act 1980; Tribunals and Inquiries Act 1992; Pension Schemes Act 1993; Police and Magistrates' Courts Act 1994; Police Act 1996; Police and Firemen's Pensions Act 1997; Scotland Act 1998 (Transfer of Functions to the Scottish Ministers etc. ) Order 1999; Financial Services and Markets Act 2000 (Consequential Amendments and Repeals) Order 2001; International Development Act 2002; Police Reform Act 2002; Serious Organised Crime and Police Act 2005; Safeguarding Vulnerable Groups Act 2006; Police and Justice Act 2006; Policing and Crime Act 2009; Police Pensions (Descriptions of Service) Order 2010; Police Reform and Social Responsibility Act 2011; Financial Services Act 2012; Police (Descriptions of Service) Order 2012; Protection of Freedoms Act 2012 (Disclosure and Barring Service Transfer of Functions) Order 2012; Crime and Courts Act 2013; Public Service Pensions Act 2013; Police and Fire Reform (Scotland) Act 2012 (Consequential Provisions and Modifications) Order 2013; Anti-social Behaviour, Crime and Policing Act 2014

Status: Amended

Text of statute as originally enacted

Revised text of statute as amended

Text of the Police Pensions Act 1976 as in force today (including any amendments) within the United Kingdom, from legislation.gov.uk.

The Police Pensions Act 1976 (c. 35) is an act of the Parliament of the United Kingdom that consolidated enactments relating to the pensions to be paid to and in respect of members of police forces in Great Britain.

== Provisions ==
=== Repealed enactments ===
Section 13(2) of the act repealed 11 enactments, listed in schedule 3 to the act.

Citation	Short title	Extent of repeal
11 & 12 Geo. 6. c. 24	Police Pensions Act 1948	The whole act.
11 & 12 Geo. 6. c. 58	Criminal Justice Act 1948	In Schedule 9, the entry relating to the Police Pensions Act 1948.
12, 13 & 14 Geo. 6. c. 94	Criminal Justice (Scotland) Act 1949	In Schedule 11, the entry relating to the Police Pensions Act 1948.
14 & 15 Geo. 6. c. 65	Reserve and Auxiliary Forces (Protection of Civil Interests) Act 1951	Section 43.
14 & 15 Geo. 6. c. 65	Reserve and Auxiliary Forces (Protection of Civil Interests) Act 1951	In section 44(1), the words from "and any regulations" to "police force".
6 & 7 Eliz. 2. c. 14	Overseas Service Act 1958	Section 5(3).
6 & 7 Eliz. 2. c. 14	Overseas Service Act 1958	Schedule 2.
9 & 10 Eliz. 2. c. 35	Police Pensions Act 1961	Section 1(1) and (4).
9 & 10 Eliz. 2. c. 35	Police Pensions Act 1961	In section 2, in subsection (1) the words from "and this" to the end, and in subsection (2) the words from the beginning to "in Northern Ireland".
1964 c. 48	Police Act 1964	Section 40.
1964 c. 48	Police Act 1964	Section 43(4).
1964 c. 48	Police Act 1964	Schedule 6.
1964 c. 48	Police Act 1964	In Schedule 9, the entries relating to the Police Pensions Act 1948.
1967 c. 28	Superannuation (Miscellaneous Provisions) Act 1967	Section 11(7).
1967 c. 77	Police (Scotland) Act 1967	Section 35.
1967 c. 77	Police (Scotland) Act 1967	Section 38(4).
1967 c. 77	Police (Scotland) Act 1967	In Schedule 4, the entry relating to the Police Pensions Act 1948.
1969 c. 63	Police Act 1969	In section 4(5), the words preceding paragraph (a).
1972 c. 11	Superannuation Act 1972	In section 15, subsections (1) to (4) and in subsection (5), paragraph (a).
1972 c. 11	Superannuation Act 1972	In Schedule 6, paragraph 23.
