= Channel Tunnel Act 1987 =

UK law authorising a Folkestone–Calais undersea rail link

Channel Tunnel Act 1987 (Note: Section 50(1).)
- Act of Parliament
- Parliament of the United Kingdom
- Long title: An Act to provide for the construction and operation of a railway tunnel system under the English Channel, together with associated works; to provide for connected improvements in the road network near Ashford, in Kent, and in the rail network in South Eastern England; to incorporate part of the railway tunnel system into the United Kingdom and to provide for the application and enforcement of law in relation to, and otherwise for the regulation of, that system and matters connected with it; to provide for the construction of certain highways and associated works in the vicinity of Folkestone; and for connected purposes.
- Citation: 1987 c. 53
- Introduced by: Sir Geoffrey Howe, Secretary of State for Foreign and Commonwealth Affairs (Commons)
- Territorial extent: United Kingdom (Note: Section 50(2).)

Dates
- Royal assent: 23 July 1987
- Commencement: 23 July 1987 (Note: Section 4(b) of the Interpretation Act 1978.)
Other legislation
Amended by	Planning (Consequential Provisions) Act 1990; Electricity Act 1989 (Consequential Modifications of Enactments) Order 1990; Transport and Works Act 1992; Railways Act 1993; Police and Magistrates' Courts Act 1994; Merchant Shipping Act 1995; Transport Act 2000; Countryside and Rights of Way Act 2000; Competition Act 1998 (Transitional, Consequential and Supplemental Provisions) Order 2000; Communications Act 2003; Enterprise Act 2002 (Consequential and Supplemental Provisions) Order 2003; Nature Conservation (Scotland) Act 2004; British Transport Police (Transitional and Consequential Provisions) Order 2004; Inquiries Act 2005; Railways Act 2005; Natural Environment and Rural Communities Act 2006; Tribunals, Courts and Enforcement Act 2007; Companies Act 2006 (Consequential Amendments, Transitional Provisions and Savings) Order 2009; Transfer of Tribunal Functions (Lands Tribunal and Miscellaneous Amendments) Order 2009; Passengers’ Council (Non-Railway Functions) Order 2010; Police Reform and Social Responsibility Act 2011
Relates to	Channel Tunnel Rail Link Act 1996

Status: Amended

Text of statute as originally enacted

Revised text of statute as amended

Text of the Channel Tunnel Act 1987 as in force today (including any amendments) within the United Kingdom, from legislation.gov.uk.

The Channel Tunnel Act 1987 (c. 53) is an act of the Parliament of the United Kingdom which authorised the construction of the Channel Tunnel between the United Kingdom and France in accordance with the Treaty of Canterbury, which was signed in 1986. Section 2 of the act forbade any public subsidy of the project.

== Notes ==
This act enabled several statutory instruments:

- the Channel Tunnel (International Arrangements) Order 1993 (SI 1993/1813), whereby the European Union agreement on border control known as the Sangatte Protocol was brought into jurisdiction by the Lord Chancellor, the Secretary of State for the Home Department, the Secretary of State for Health, the Minister of Agriculture, Fisheries and Food and the Commissioners of Customs and Excise. The Sangatte Protocol is a 12-page document written in the national language of each state, which deals with responsibility for, inter alia, asylum applications. The French legislated it by Décret n°93-1136.
- the Channel Tunnel (Miscellaneous Provisions) Order 1994 (SI 1994/1405).

For sea-related matters, see the Nationality, Immigration and Asylum Act 2002, and the Nationality, Immigration and Asylum Act 2002 (Juxtaposed Controls) Order 2003.

The Immigration Act 1971 allows the search of vehicles and the control checkpoint analogous to those at Heathrow Airport.
