= Justices of the Peace Act 1979 =

Act of the Parliament of the United Kingdom

Justices of the Peace Act 1979 (Note: Section 72(1).)
- Act of Parliament
- Parliament of the United Kingdom
- Long title: An Act to consolidate certain enactments relating to justices of the peace (including stipendiary magistrates), justices' clerks and the administrative and financial arrangements for magistrates' courts, and to matters connected therewith, with amendments to give effect to recommendations of the Law Commission.
- Citation: 1979 c. 55
- Territorial extent: England and Wales (Note: Section 72(3).)

Dates
- Royal assent: 6 December 1979
- Commencement: 6 March 1980 (Note: Section 72(2).)
- Repealed: 19 June 1997

Other legislation
- Amends: See § Repealed enactments
- Repeals/revokes: See § Repealed enactments
- Amended by: Magistrates' Courts Act 1980; Pilotage Act 1987; Legal Aid Act 1988; Statute Law (Repeals) Act 1989
- Repealed by: Justices of the Peace Act 1997

Status: Repealed

Text of statute as originally enacted

Revised text of statute as amended

The Justices of the Peace Act 1979 (c. 55) was an act of the Parliament of the United Kingdom that consolidated enactments relating to justices of the peace (including stipendiary magistrates), justices' clerks, and the administrative and financial arrangements for magistrates' courts in England and Wales.

== Provisions ==
=== Repealed enactments ===
Section 71(2)(b) of the act repealed 20 enactments, listed in schedule 3 to the act.

Enactments repealed by section 71(2)(b)
Citation	Short title	Extent of repeal
16 Geo. 2. c. 18	Justices Jurisdiction Act 1742	The whole act.
11 & 12 Vict. c. 44	Justices Protection Act 1848	The whole act.
21 & 22 Vict. c. 73	Stipendiary Magistrates Act 1858	The whole act except sections 7 and 15.
40 & 41 Vict. c. 43	Justices' Clerks Act 1877	The whole act so far as unrepealed.
51 & 52 Vict. c. 41	Local Government Act 1888	In section 42, subsection (12).
60 & 61 Vict. c. 26	Metropolitan Police Courts Act 1897	Section 1.
60 & 61 Vict. c. 26	Metropolitan Police Courts Act 1897	Section 8.
1 & 2 Geo. 6. c. 63	Administration of Justice (Miscellaneous Provisions) Act 1938	In schedule 2, the entry relating to the Justices Protection Act 1848.
12, 13 & 14 Geo. 6. c. 101	Justices of the Peace Act 1949	Section 1.
12, 13 & 14 Geo. 6. c. 101	Justices of the Peace Act 1949	Section 3.
12, 13 & 14 Geo. 6. c. 101	Justices of the Peace Act 1949	Section 5.
12, 13 & 14 Geo. 6. c. 101	Justices of the Peace Act 1949	Section 13.
12, 13 & 14 Geo. 6. c. 101	Justices of the Peace Act 1949	In section 15, in subsection (5), the words from the beginning to "with the committee".
12, 13 & 14 Geo. 6. c. 101	Justices of the Peace Act 1949	Sections 16 to 19.
12, 13 & 14 Geo. 6. c. 101	Justices of the Peace Act 1949	In section 20, subsections (1), (2), (4), (5) and (7).
12, 13 & 14 Geo. 6. c. 101	Justices of the Peace Act 1949	Section 21.
12, 13 & 14 Geo. 6. c. 101	Justices of the Peace Act 1949	Section 23.
12, 13 & 14 Geo. 6. c. 101	Justices of the Peace Act 1949	Sections 25 to 27.
12, 13 & 14 Geo. 6. c. 101	Justices of the Peace Act 1949	Section 42.
12, 13 & 14 Geo. 6. c. 101	Justices of the Peace Act 1949	Section 44.
12, 13 & 14 Geo. 6. c. 101	Justices of the Peace Act 1949	Schedule 4.
15 & 16 Geo. 6 & 1 Eliz. 2. c. 55	Magistrates' Courts Act 1952	In section 116, subsection (1).
15 & 16 Geo. 6 & 1 Eliz. 2. c. 55	Magistrates' Courts Act 1952	In section 118, subsection (3) and, in subsection (4), the words from "but" onwards.
15 & 16 Geo. 6 & 1 Eliz. 2. c. 55	Magistrates' Courts Act 1952	In section 121, subsection (1).
7 & 8 Eliz. 2. c. 45	Metropolitan Magistrates' Courts Act 1959	Section 2.
1964 c. 42	Administration of Justice Act 1964	Sections 2 and 3.
1964 c. 42	Administration of Justice Act 1964	Sections 9 and 10.
1964 c. 42	Administration of Justice Act 1964	Sections 13 to 17.
1964 c. 42	Administration of Justice Act 1964	Sections 27 and 28.
1964 c. 42	Administration of Justice Act 1964	Section 30.
1964 c. 42	Administration of Justice Act 1964	Section 32.
1964 c. 42	Administration of Justice Act 1964	Section 36.
1964 c. 42	Administration of Justice Act 1964	In section 37, subsection (4).
1964 c. 42	Administration of Justice Act 1964	In schedule 3, in paragraph 12, sub-paragraph (1); in paragraph 20, sub-paragraphs (6) and (7).
1965 c. 28	Justices of the Peace Act 1965	The whole act.
1968 c. 69	Justices of the Peace Act 1968	In section 1, subsections (2) and (3).
1968 c. 69	Justices of the Peace Act 1968	Section 3.
1968 c. 69	Justices of the Peace Act 1968	Section 5.
1968 c. 69	Justices of the Peace Act 1968	Schedule 2.
1968 c. 69	Justices of the Peace Act 1968	In schedule 3, paragraphs 2, 3 and 4(4) and Part III.
1971 c. 23	Courts Act 1971	In section 3, the words from "and commissions of the peace" onwards (but without prejudice to their operation in relation to any commission of the peace issued before the commencement of this act).
1971 c. 23	Courts Act 1971	In section 53(1), the words from the beginning to "schedule 7 to this act; and".
1971 c. 23	Courts Act 1971	In schedule 7, paragraphs 1 to 3.
1971 c. 23	Courts Act 1971	In schedule 8, in paragraph 43, sub-paragraphs (1), (3) and (4).
1972 c. 70	Local Government Act 1972	In section 216, in subsection (2), the words "217".
1972 c. 70	Local Government Act 1972	In section 217, subsections (1) to (3), and subsection (5) so far as unrepealed.
1972 c. 70	Local Government Act 1972	In schedule 27, paragraphs 1 to 15, paragraph 17 and paragraph 19.
1972 c. 71	Criminal Justice Act 1972	Sections 61 and 62.
1973 c. 15	Administration of Justice Act 1973	In section 1, subsections (1) to (8).
1973 c. 15	Administration of Justice Act 1973	In section 2, subsections (1) to (3) and subsections (5) to (7).
1973 c. 15	Administration of Justice Act 1973	Section 3.
1973 c. 15	Administration of Justice Act 1973	In section 20, subsections (3) and (4); subsection (5) except, in the proviso to that subsection, the words in paragraph (b) from the beginning to "metropolitan stipendiary magistrate"; and in subsection (6), the word "or" where it last occurs in paragraph (a) and the words from the beginning of paragraph (b) to the end of the subsection.
1973 c. 15	Administration of Justice Act 1973	In schedule 1, paragraphs 1, 4, 5, 6, 8, 9(1) and 12.
1975 c. 60	Social Security Pensions Act 1975	In schedule 4, paragraph 5.
1977 c. 38	Administration of Justice Act 1977	Section 21.
1977 c. 38	Administration of Justice Act 1977	In schedule 2, paragraph 5.
1978 c. 22	Domestic Proceedings and Magistrates' Courts Act 1978	Section 86.

== Subsequent developments ==
The whole act was repealed by section 73(3) of, and schedule 6 to, the Justices of the Peace Act 1997, which came into force on 19 June 1997.
