= House of Commons Members' Fund Act 2016 =

Act of the Parliament of the United Kingdom

House of Commons Members' Fund Act 2016 (Note: Section 12.)
- Act of Parliament
- Parliament of the United Kingdom
- Long title: An Act to consolidate and amend provisions about the House of Commons Members' Fund.
- Citation: 2016 c. 18
- Introduced by: Sir Paul Beresford (Commons); Lord Naseby (Lords)
- Territorial extent: United Kingdom (Note: Section 11.)

Dates
- Royal assent: 12 May 2016
- Commencement: 12 August 2016 (Note: Section 10.)
Other legislation
Amends	Income and Corporation Taxes Act 1988; Income Tax (Earnings and Pensions) Act 2003; See § Repealed enactments
Repeals/revokes	House of Commons Members' Fund Act 1939; House of Commons Members' Fund Act 1948; House of Commons Members' Fund Act 1957; House of Commons Members' Fund Act 1962; House of Commons Members' Fund and Parliamentary Pensions Act 1981
Relates to	Statutory Instruments Act 1946

Status: Current legislation

History of passage through Parliament

Text of statute as originally enacted

Revised text of statute as amended

The House of Commons Members' Fund Act 2016 (c. 18) is an act of the Parliament of the United Kingdom.

== Background ==
The House of Commons Members' Fund (HCMF) was established in 1939, before a pension scheme was established in 1964, to help former Members and their dependants who had financial difficulty.

== Passage ==
The act was passed as a private member's bill, introduced under the Ten Minute Rule by Sir Paul Beresford.

== Provisions ==
The act simplifies and consolidates legislation containing the provisions for to the House of Commons Members' Fund.

The act empowers trustees to cease requiring contributions from MPs (which was previously £2 per member per month) and to return surplus funds to HM Treasury. It also extend the class of beneficiaries to assist all dependants of former Members who experience severe hardship. It would also allow one of the trustees to be a former MP.

=== Repealed enactments ===
Section 9 of the act repealed 7 enactments, listed in that section.

Citation	Short title	Extent of repeal	Notes
2 & 3 Geo. 6. c. 49	House of Commons Members' Fund Act 1939	The whole act.	Established the fund
11 & 12 Geo. 6. c. 36	House of Commons Members' Fund Act 1948	The whole act.	Extended assistance to widowers
5 & 6 Eliz. 2. c. 24	House of Commons Members' Fund Act 1957	The whole act.	Created Treasury contributions to the fund
10 & 11 Eliz. 2. c. 53	House of Commons Members' Fund Act 1962	The whole act.	
1981 c. 7	House of Commons Members' Fund and Parliamentary Pensions Act 1981	The whole act.	Created pensions for certain former members
1984 c. 52	Parliamentary Pensions etc. Act 1984	Section 12.	
1991 c. 5	Ministerial and Other Pensions and Salaries Act 1991	Section 7.	
