= Riot Compensation Act 2016 =

Act of the Parliament of the United Kingdom

Riot Compensation Act 2016 (Note: Section 12(4).)
- Act of Parliament
- Parliament of the United Kingdom
- Long title: An Act to repeal the Riot (Damages) Act 1886 and make provision about types of claims, procedures, decision-making and limits on awards payable in relation to a new compensation scheme for property damaged, destroyed or stolen in the course of riots.
- Citation: 2016 c. 8
- Introduced by: Mike Wood (Commons); Lord Trefgarne (Lords)
- Territorial extent: England and Wales (Note: Section 12(3).)

Dates
- Royal assent: 23 March 2016
- Commencement: 23 March 2016 (sections 11 and 12); 6 April 2017 (rest of act); (Note: Section 12(1)–(2). The Riot Compensation Act 2016 (Commencement) Regulations 2017 (SI 2017/379).)
Other legislation
Amends	Police Act 1964; Public Order Act 1986; Merchant Shipping Act 1995; Police Act 1996; Greater London Authority Act 1999; Police Reform and Social Responsibility Act 2011
Repeals/revokes	Riot (Damages) Act 1886
Amended by	Riot Compensation Regulations 2017

Status: Amended

History of passage through Parliament

Records of Parliamentary debate relating to the statute from Hansard, at TheyWorkForYou

Text of statute as originally enacted

Revised text of statute as amended

The Riot Compensation Act 2016 (c. 8) is an act of the Parliament of the United Kingdom that repeals the Riot (Damages) Act 1886 (49 & 50 Vict. c. 38) and modernizes the procedures for the payment of compensation to persons whose property has been injured, destroyed or stolen during a riot.

It arose as a ballot bill sponsored by Mike Wood MP, following Government review and consultations on the subject, and it received Home Office support to expedite its passage.

== Background ==
As a result of the 2011 England riots, significant problems were exposed concerning the administration of claims intended to be indemnified under the scheme established under the Riot (Damages) Act 1886. An independent review of the act reported in 2013 that:

- the language of the act needed to be modernized;
- compensation payable to insurers should be capped;
- it should be extended to cover other types of property such as motor vehicles;
- it should be based on the replacement value of the property damaged, but not include any consequential loss; (Note: The question of consequential loss was unclear under the 1886 Act, but was held not to be applicable as a result of the Supreme Court's 2016 ruling in The Mayor's Office for Policing and Crime v Mitsui Sumitomo Insurance Co (Europe) Ltd.)
- the Home Office should work with the insurance industry to improve claims administration; and
- interim payments should be made available with respect to claims.

Following a round of public consultations, the Government broadly accepted the reviewer's recommendations, including extending limited compensation for damage to motor vehicles whose policies do not have coverage for riot damages, and further specified that the statutory definition for a riot should be drawn from the Public Order Act 1986.

The implementing bill was introduced on 24 June 2015, and received royal assent on 23 March 2016.

== Provisions ==
The act introduces several key changes, including:

- allowing insurers who have met claims from people or businesses to claim compensation from the local policing body: (Note: defined as a police and crime commissioner, the Mayor's Office for Policing and Crime with respect to the Metropolitan Police District, or the Common Council of the City of London with respect to the City of London Police area, by virtue of s. 101(6) of the Police Act 1996)
- allowing people and businesses, which are not insured, to claim compensation from the local policing body;
- requiring that the amount of compensation must reflect only the loss directly resulting from the damage, destruction or theft of the property, and in particular, must not reflect any consequential loss resulting from it;
- ending unlimited compensation, setting a £1m cap on each claim; and
- allowing for claims on motor vehicles which are not insured for riot damage, but which are covered by an insurance policy at the time.

=== Commencement ===
Authority for making necessary regulations (Note: Subsequently passed as The Riot Compensation Regulations 2017.) by way of statutory instrument came into effect on royal assent. The remainder of the act took effect on 6 April 2017.

== Bibliography ==
- Kinghan, Neil (September 2013). "Independent Review of the Riot (Damages) Act 1886: Report of the Review" (PDF).
- "Riot Compensation Act 2016" (PDF). London: Kennedys Law LLP. 2016.
- "Riot Compensation Bill: Explanatory Notes" (PDF). House of Lords. 23 February 2016.
