= Police Reform Act 2002 =

Act of the Parliament of the United Kingdom

Police Reform Act 2002 (Note: Section 108(1).)
- Act of Parliament
- Parliament of the United Kingdom
- Long title: An Act to make new provision about the supervision, administration, functions and conduct of police forces, police officers and other persons serving with, or carrying out functions in relation to, the police; to amend police powers and to provide for the exercise of police powers by persons who are not police officers; to amend the law relating to anti-social behaviour orders; to amend the law relating to sex offender orders; and for connected purposes.
- Citation: 2002 c. 30
- Territorial extent: England and Wales; Scotland (in part); Northern Ireland (in part); (Note: Section 108(6)–(10).)

Dates
- Royal assent: 24 July 2002
- Commencement: Various (Note: Section 108(2)–(5).)
Other legislation
Amends	Local Government (Scotland) Act 1973; Police Pensions Act 1976; Firearms (Amendment) Act 1988; Official Secrets Act 1989; Police Act 1996; Public Interest Disclosure Act 1998; Countryside and Rights of Way Act 2000; Anti-terrorism, Crime and Security Act 2001
Amended by	Violent Crime Reduction Act 2006; Criminal Justice and Immigration Act 2008; Crime and Courts Act 2013; Investigatory Powers Act 2016; Policing and Crime Act 2017; Sentencing Act 2020; Covert Human Intelligence Sources (Criminal Conduct) Act 2021; Renters' Rights Act 2025; Public Authorities (Fraud, Error and Recovery) Act 2025; Employment Rights Act 2025; Tobacco and Vapes Act 2026; Crime And Policing Act 2026

Status: Amended

Text of statute as originally enacted

Revised text of statute as amended

The Police Reform Act 2002 (c. 30) is an act of the Parliament of the United Kingdom.

Amongst the provisions of the act are the creation of the role of Police Community Support Officers, who have some police powers whilst not being 'sworn' constables, and the ability for chief constables to confer a more limited range of police powers on other (non-sworn) individuals as part of Community Safety Accreditation Schemes. The act also replaced the Police Complaints Authority with the Independent Police Complaints Commission (later replaced by the Independent Office for Police Conduct).

== Section 59 ==
Section 59 of the act is a common tool now used by Police Constables and Police Community Support Officers (PCSOs) to seize vehicles being used in an anti-social manner. Vehicles can be seized if the police officer or PCSO reasonably believes that a mechanically propelled vehicle is being used in a manner:

- causing, or likely to cause alarm, distress or annoyance to the public,
- and:
  - contravening section 3 (careless/inconsiderate driving), or
  - contravening section 34 (prohibition of off-road driving/driving other than a road) of the Road Traffic Act 1988, or
  - is being used or has been used in connection with an offence under section 33 of the Environmental Protection Act 1990 (prohibition on unauthorised or harmful deposit, treatment or disposal of waste)

Vehicles should be issued with a warning first, unless this is impracticable. An example of it being impractical would be the offenders leaving the vehicle/making off or the vehicle being unregistered and unable to be traced - therefore a warning unable to be placed. If an officer also reasonably believes a warning has been given within the past 12 months - whether or not recorded on the Police National Computer or similar system, they can seize the vehicle immediately.
