= Police Reform and Social Responsibility Act 2011 =

Act of the Parliament of the United Kingdom

Police Reform and Social Responsibility Act 2011 (Note: Section 158.)
- Act of Parliament
- Parliament of the United Kingdom
- Long title: An Act to make provision about the administration and governance of police forces; about the licensing of, and for the imposition of a late night levy in relation to, the sale and supply of alcohol, and for the repeal of provisions about alcohol disorder zones; for the repeal of sections 132 to 138 of the Serious Organised Crime and Police Act 2005 and for the prohibition of certain activities in Parliament Square; to enable provision in local authority byelaws to include powers of seizure and forfeiture; about the control of dangerous or otherwise harmful drugs; to restrict the issue of arrest warrants for certain extra-territorial offences; and for connected purposes.
- Citation: 2011 c. 13
- Introduced by: Theresa May, Home Secretary (Commons); Baroness Browning, Minister of State for Crime Prevention and Antisocial Behaviour Reduction (Lords)
- Territorial extent: England and Wales; Sections 58, 152, 154, 157, and 158, and Schedule 58 also extend to Scotland and Northern Ireland, Section 98 and Schedule 15 extend to England, Wales and Scotland; (Note: Section 156.)

Dates
- Royal assent: 15 September 2011
- Commencement: Various (Note: Section 157.)
Other legislation
Amends	Riot (Damages) Act 1886; Parks Regulation (Amendment) Act 1926; Local Government Act 1966; Employers' Liability (Compulsory Insurance) Act 1969; Misuse of Drugs Act 1971; Pensions (Increase) Act 1971; House of Commons Disqualification Act 1975; Police Pensions Act 1976; Rent Act 1977; Customs and Excise Management Act 1979; Magistrates' Courts Act 1980; Aviation Security Act 1982; County Courts Act 1984; Housing Associations Act 1985; Channel Tunnel Act 1987; Town and Country Planning Act 1990; Value Added Tax Act 1994; Police Act 1996; Political Parties, Elections and Referendums Act 2000; Public Audit (Wales) Act 2004; Government of Wales Act 2006; Violent Crime Reduction Act 2006
Amended by	Riot Compensation Act 2016; Investigatory Powers Act 2016; Policing and Crime Act 2017; Wales Act 2017; Elections Act 2022; English Devolution and Community Empowerment Act 2026; Tobacco and Vapes Act 2026
Relates to	Magistrates' Courts Act 1980

Status: Amended

History of passage through Parliament

Text of statute as originally enacted

Revised text of statute as amended

The Police Reform and Social Responsibility Act 2011 (c. 13) is an act of the Parliament of the United Kingdom.

== Provisions ==
=== Police and crime commissioners ===
It transfers the control of police forces from police authorities to elected police and crime commissioners. The first police commissioner elections were held in November 2012. The next elections took place in May 2016 and will subsequently take place every four years.

=== Mayor's Office for Policing and Crime ===
The act replaced the Metropolitan Policing Authority with the Mayor's Office for Police and Crime.

=== Prohibited activities near Parliament Square ===
The act repeals the provisions in the Serious Organised Crime and Police Act 2005 which prohibit protests near Parliament Square, and instead restricts certain "prohibited activities" in Parliament Square garden and the adjoining footways. The police have used these powers to confiscate pizza boxes, tarpaulin and umbrellas from protesters in Parliament Square.

=== Advisory Council on the Misuse of Drugs ===
The act removed the statutory requirement for the Advisory Council on the Misuse of Drugs to include scientists. The move follows the sacking of David Nutt from the council in 2009.

=== Arrest warrants for offences of universal jurisdiction ===
Section 153 of the act amends section 1 of Magistrates' Courts Act 1980 so that an arrest warrant for an offence of universal jurisdiction cannot be issued without the consent of the Director of Public Prosecutions, unless applied for by a Crown Prosecutor.

== Proposed amendments ==
In 2021, the government published their proposed Police, Crime, Sentencing and Courts Bill which would amend the Police Reform and Social Responsibility Act, in relation to behaviour around and access to the Parliamentary estate. This was enacted as the Police, Crime, Sentencing and Courts Act 2022.

In 2025, the government intends to abolish police and crime commissioners by 2028.
