= List of acts of the Parliament of the United Kingdom from 1994 =

This is a list of acts of the Parliament of the United Kingdom passed in 1994.

Acts passed since 1963 are cited by calendar year, as opposed to the convention used for earlier acts of citing the regnal year(s) in which the relevant parliamentary session was held. Each act passed in a respective year is given a chapter number (abbreviated "c."), denoted by Arabic numerals in the case of public general acts, lowercase Roman numerals in the case of local acts, or italicised Arabic numerals in the case of personal acts. These run as separate series.

57 acts of Parliament were passed in 1994: 41 public general acts and 16 local acts.

indicates that an act has been transcribed on Wikisource, indicates that an act is available to view at legislation.gov.uk, and indicates the location of the original act in the Parliamentary Archives.

== Public general acts ==
Short title	Citation	Royal assent
Long title
Social Security (Contributions) Act 1994	1994 c. 1	10 February 1994
An Act to increase primary Class 1 contributions payable under the Social Security Contributions and Benefits Act 1992; (Note: Social Security Contributions and Benefits Act 1992 (c. 4)) to correct the provisions as to the appropriate national health service allocation in the case of such contributions; to clarify what reliefs are to be taken into account in assessing Class 4 contributions; and for connected purposes.
Statutory Sick Pay Act 1994	1994 c. 2	10 February 1994
An Act to remove the right of employers other than small employers to recover sums paid by them by way of statutory sick pay; to enable the Secretary of State to make further provision by order as to the recovery of such sums; and for connected purposes.
Non-Domestic Rating Act 1994	1994 c. 3	24 February 1994
An Act to make further provision with respect to non-domestic rating for the financial year beginning in 1994 and subsequent financial years; and for connected purposes.
Consolidated Fund Act 1994 (repealed)	1994 c. 4	24 March 1994
An Act to apply certain sums out of the Consolidated Fund to the service of the years ending on 31st March 1993 and 1994. (Repealed by Appropriation Act 1996 (c. 45))
New Towns (Amendment) Act 1994 (repealed)	1994 c. 5	24 March 1994
An Act to amend Schedule 9 to the New Towns Act 1981. (Note: New Towns Act 1981 (c. 64)) (Repealed by Housing and Regeneration Act 2008 (c. 17))
Mental Health (Amendment) Act 1994 (repealed)	1994 c. 6	24 March 1994
An Act to amend section 145(1) of the Mental Health Act 1983. (Note: Mental Health Act 1983 (c. 20)) (Repealed by Statute Law (Repeals) Act 2004 (c. 14))
Insolvency Act 1994	1994 c. 7	24 March 1994
An Act to amend the Insolvency Act 1986 (Note: Insolvency Act 1986 (c. 45)) in relation to contracts of employment adopted by administrators, administrative receivers and certain other receivers; and to make corresponding provision for Northern Ireland.
Transport Police (Jurisdiction) Act 1994	1994 c. 8	24 March 1994
An Act to make further provision with respect to the jurisdiction of transport police.
Finance Act 1994	1994 c. 9	3 May 1994
An Act to grant certain duties, to alter other duties, and to amend the law relating to the National Debt and the Public Revenue, and to make further provision in connection with Finance.
Race Relations (Remedies) Act 1994 (repealed)	1994 c. 10	3 May 1994
An Act to remove the limit imposed by subsection (2) of section 56 of the Race Relations Act 1976 (Note: Race Relations Act 1976 (c. 74)) on the amount of compensation which may be awarded under that section and to make provision for interest in connection with sums so awarded; and for connected purposes. (Repealed by Equality Act 2010 (Consequential Amendments, Saving and Supplementary Provisions) Order 2010 (SI 2010/2279))
Road Traffic Regulation (Special Events) Act 1994	1994 c. 11	3 May 1994
An Act to make provision, in connection with sporting or social events held on roads or entertainments so held, for the restriction or regulation of traffic on roads; and for connected purposes.
Insolvency (No. 2) Act 1994	1994 c. 12	26 May 1994
An Act to amend the law relating to company insolvency and winding up, and the insolvency and bankruptcy of individuals, so far as it concerns the adjustment of certain transactions; and for connected purposes.
Intelligence Services Act 1994	1994 c. 13	26 May 1994
An Act to make provision about the Secret Intelligence Service and the Government Communications Headquarters, including provision for the issue of warrants and authorisations enabling certain actions to be taken and for the issue of such warrants and authorisations to be kept under review; to make further provision about warrants issued on applications by the Security Service; to establish a procedure for the investigation of complaints about the Secret Intelligence Service and the Government Communications Headquarters; to make provision for the establishment of an Intelligence and Security Committee to scrutinise all three of those bodies; and for connected purposes.
Parliamentary Commissioner Act 1994	1994 c. 14	5 July 1994
An Act to include among the matters subject to investigation by the Parliamentary Commissioner for Administration actions taken in the exercise of administrative functions by the administrative staff of certain tribunals.
Antarctic Act 1994	1994 c. 15	5 July 1994
An Act to make new provision in connection with the Antarctic Treaty signed at Washington on 1st December 1959; to make provision consequential on the Protocol on Environmental Protection to that Treaty done at Madrid on 4th October 1991; to make provision consequential on the Convention on the Conservation of Antarctic Marine Living Resources (Note: Convention for the Conservation of Antarctic Marine Living Resources) drawn up at Canberra on 20th May 1980; to provide for the taking of criminal proceedings against, and the punishment of, British citizens and others in respect of certain acts and omissions occurring in that part of Antarctica that lies between 150° West longitude and 90° West longitude; and for connected purposes.
State Hospitals (Scotland) Act 1994	1994 c. 16	5 July 1994
An Act to amend the National Health Service (Scotland) Act 1978 (Note: National Health Service (Scotland) Act 1978 (c. 29)) and the Mental Health (Scotland) Act 1984 (Note: Mental Health (Scotland) Act 1984 (c. 36)) in relation to the provision, control and management of state hospitals in Scotland.
Chiropractors Act 1994	1994 c. 17	5 July 1994
An Act to establish a body to be known as the General Chiropractic Council; to provide for the regulation of the chiropractic profession, including making provision as to the registration of chiropractors and as to their professional education and conduct; to make provision in connection with the development and promotion of the profession; to amend, and make provision in connection with, the Osteopaths Act 1993; (Note: Osteopaths Act 1993 (c. 21)) and for connected purposes.
Social Security (Incapacity for Work) Act 1994	1994 c. 18	5 July 1994
An Act to provide for incapacity benefit in place of sickness benefit and invalidity benefit; to make provision as to the test of incapacity for work for the purposes of that benefit and other social security purposes; to make provision as to the rate of statutory sick pay; to make other amendments as to certain allowances payable to a person who is or has been incapable of work; and for connected purposes.
Local Government (Wales) Act 1994	1994 c. 19	5 July 1994
An Act to make provision with respect to local government in Wales.
Sunday Trading Act 1994	1994 c. 20	5 July 1994
An Act to reform the law of England and Wales relating to Sunday trading; to make provision as to the rights of shop workers under the law of England and Wales in relation to Sunday working; and for connected purposes.
Coal Industry Act 1994	1994 c. 21	5 July 1994
An Act to provide for the establishment and functions of a body to be known as the Coal Authority; to provide for the restructuring of the coal industry, for transfers of the property, rights and liabilities of the British Coal Corporation and its wholly-owned subsidiaries to other persons and for the dissolution of that Corporation; to abolish the Domestic Coal Consumers' Council; to make provision for the licensing of coal-mining operations and provision otherwise in relation to the carrying on of such operations; to amend the Coal Mining Subsidence Act 1991 (Note: Coal Mining Subsidence Act 1991 (c. 45)) and the Opencast Coal Act 1958; (Note: Opencast Coal Act 1958 (6 & 7 Eliz. 2. c. 69)) and for connected purposes.
Vehicle Excise and Registration Act 1994	1994 c. 22	5 July 1994
An Act to consolidate the enactments relating to vehicle excise duty and the registration of vehicles.
Value Added Tax Act 1994	1994 c. 23	5 July 1994
An Act to consolidate the enactments relating to value added tax, including certain enactments relating to VAT tribunals.
Appropriation Act 1994 (repealed)	1994 c. 24	21 July 1994
An Act to apply a sum out of the Consolidated Fund to the service of the year ending on 31st March 1995; to appropriate the supplies granted in this Session of Parliament; and to repeal certain Consolidated Fund and Appropriation Acts. (Repealed by Appropriation Act 1996 (c. 45))
Land Drainage Act 1994	1994 c. 25	21 July 1994
An Act to amend the Land Drainage Act 1991 (Note: Land Drainage Act 1991 (c. 59)) in relation to the functions of internal drainage boards and local authorities.
Trade Marks Act 1994	1994 c. 26	21 July 1994
An Act to make new provision for registered trade marks, implementing Council Directive No. 89/104/EEC (Note: Trade Marks Directive (2015/2436/EU)) of 21st December 1988 to approximate the laws of the Member States relating to trade marks; to make provision in connection with Council Regulation (EC) No. 40/94 of 20th December 1993 on the Community trade mark; to give effect to the Madrid Protocol Relating to the International Registration of Marks (Note: Madrid Protocol) of 27th June 1989, and to certain provisions of the Paris Convention for the Protection of Industrial Property (Note: Paris Convention for the Protection of Industrial Property) of 20th March 1883, as revised and amended; and for connected purposes.
Inshore Fishing (Scotland) Act 1994	1994 c. 27	21 July 1994
An Act to amend the Inshore Fishing (Scotland) Act 1984 (Note: Inshore Fishing (Scotland) Act 1984 (c. 26)) to make provision for the control of fishing in Scottish inshore waters by vehicles or equipment.
Merchant Shipping (Salvage and Pollution) Act 1994 (repealed)	1994 c. 28	21 July 1994
An Act to make further provision in relation to marine salvage and marine pollution and the discharge of functions of the Secretary of State in connection therewith; and for purposes connected with those purposes. (Repealed by Merchant Shipping Act 1995 (c. 21))
Police and Magistrates' Courts Act 1994	1994 c. 29	21 July 1994
An Act to make provision about police areas, police forces and police authorities; to make provision for England and Wales about magistrates' courts committees, justices' clerks and administrative and financial arrangements for magistrates' courts; and for connected purposes.
Education Act 1994	1994 c. 30	21 July 1994
An Act to make provision about teacher training and related matters; to make provision with respect to the conduct of students' unions; and for connected purposes.
Firearms (Amendment) Act 1994	1994 c. 31	21 July 1994
An Act to create a new offence of possessing a firearm or imitation firearm with intent to cause fear of violence; to apply certain provisions of the Firearms Act 1968 (Note: Firearms Act 1968 (c. 27)) to imitation firearms; and for connected purposes.
Sale of Goods (Amendment) Act 1994	1994 c. 32	3 November 1994
An Act to abolish the rule of law relating to the sale of goods in market overt.
Criminal Justice and Public Order Act 1994	1994 c. 33	3 November 1994
An Act to make further provision in relation to criminal justice (including employment in the prison service); to amend or extend the criminal law and powers for preventing crime and enforcing that law; to amend the Video Recordings Act 1984; (Note: Video Recordings Act 1984 (c. 39)) and for purposes connected with those purposes.
Marriage Act 1994	1994 c. 34	3 November 1994
An Act to amend the Marriage Act 1949 (Note: Marriage Act 1949 (12, 13 & 14 Geo. 6. c. 76)) so as to enable civil marriages to be solemnized on premises approved for the purpose by local authorities and so as to provide for further cases in which marriages may be solemnized in registration districts in which neither party to the marriage resides; and for connected purposes.
Sale and Supply of Goods Act 1994	1994 c. 35	3 November 1994
An Act to amend the law relating to the sale of goods; to make provision as to the terms to be implied in certain agreements for the transfer of property in or the hire of goods, in hire-purchase agreements and on the exchange of goods for trading stamps and as to the remedies for breach of the terms of such agreements; and for connected purposes.
Law of Property (Miscellaneous Provisions) Act 1994	1994 c. 36	3 November 1994
An Act to provide for new covenants for title to be implied on dispositions of property; to amend the law with respect to certain matters arising in connection with the death of the owner of property; and for connected purposes.
Drug Trafficking Act 1994	1994 c. 37	3 November 1994
An Act to consolidate the Drug Trafficking Offences Act 1986 (Note: Drug Trafficking Offences Act 1986 (c. 32)) and certain provisions of the Criminal Justice (International Co-operation) Act 1990 (Note: Criminal Justice (International Co-operation) Act 1990 (c. 5)) relating to drug trafficking.
European Union (Accessions) Act 1994 (repealed)	1994 c. 38	3 November 1994
An Act to amend the definition of "the Treaties" and "the Community Treaties" in section 1(2) of the European Communities Act 1972 (Note: European Communities Act 1972 (c. 68)) so as to include the treaty concerning the accession of the Kingdom of Norway, the Republic of Austria, the Republic of Finland and the Kingdom of Sweden to the European Union; and to approve that treaty for the purposes of section 6 of the European Parliamentary Elections Act 1978. (Note: European Parliamentary Elections Act 1978 (c. 10)) (Repealed by European Union (Withdrawal) Act 2018 (Consequential Modifications and Repeals and Revocations) (EU Exit) Regulations 2019 (SI 2019/628))
Local Government etc. (Scotland) Act 1994	1994 c. 39	3 November 1994
An Act to make provision with respect to local government and the functions of local authorities; to make amendments in relation to local government finance, local authority accounts and the records of local authorities; to establish a Strathclyde Passenger Transport Authority for the purposes of the Transport Act 1968; (Note: Transport Act 1968 (c. 73)) to provide for the establishment of new water and sewerage authorities; to provide for the establishment of a council to represent the interests of customers and potential customers of those new authorities; to provide for the vesting in those new authorities of the property, rights and liabilities of the Central Scotland Water Development Board and of such property, rights and liabilities of regional and islands councils as those councils have as water authorities, as providers of sewerage and in relation to dealing with the contents of sewers; to provide for the dissolution of that Board; to cancel certain obligations to contribute towards expenses which have been incurred by local authorities in making provision for sewerage or disposal of sewage in rural localities; to create an office of Principal Reporter and transfer to him the functions of reporters to children's hearings; to establish a body to facilitate the performance by the Principal Reporter of his functions; to amend the Social Work (Scotland) Act 1968 (Note: Social Work (Scotland) Act 1968 (c. 49)) in relation to children's hearings; to amend the procedure for making byelaws under section 121 of the Civic Government (Scotland) Act 1982; (Note: Civic Government (Scotland) Act 1982 (c. 45)) to transfer to local authorities responsibility for fixing and reviewing polling districts and polling places in Parliamentary elections; to amend section 21 of the Self-Governing Schools etc. (Scotland) Act 1989; (Note: Self-Governing Schools etc. (Scotland) Act 1989 (c. 39)) to amend the law relating to roads and the placing of traffic signs on roads; to make amendments in relation to valuation and rating; to abolish the Scottish Valuation Advisory Council; to empower the Strathclyde Passenger Transport Authority to guarantee certain obligations; to empower local authorities to make grants to ethnic minorities; to confer on local authorities the function of promoting economic development; to provide for the establishment of area tourist boards; to make amendments in relation to lieutenancies; all as respects Scotland; and for connected purposes.
Deregulation and Contracting Out Act 1994	1994 c. 40	3 November 1994
An Act to amend, and make provision for the amendment of, statutory provisions and rules of law in order to remove or reduce certain burdens affecting persons in the carrying on of trades, businesses or professions or otherwise, and for other deregulatory purposes; to make further provision in connection with the licensing of operators of goods vehicles; to make provision for and in connection with the contracting out of certain functions vested in Ministers of the Crown, local authorities, certain governmental bodies and the holders of certain offices; and for purposes connected therewith.
Consolidated Fund (No. 2) Act 1994 (repealed)	1994 c. 41	16 December 1994
An Act to apply certain sums out of the Consolidated Fund to the service of the years ending on 31st March 1995 and 1996. (Repealed by Appropriation Act 1996 (c. 45))

== Local acts ==
Short title	Citation	Royal assent
Long title
British Railways Order Confirmation Act 1994	1994 c. i	24 March 1994
An Act to confirm a Provisional Order under the Private Legislation Procedure (Scotland) Act 1936, (Note: Private Legislation Procedure (Scotland) Act 1936 (26 Geo. 5 & 1 Edw. 8. c. 52)) relating to British Railways.
	British Railways Order 1994 Provisional Order to empower the British Railways Board to construct works and to purchase or use land; to confer further powers on the Board; and for other purposes.	
British Railways (No. 2) Order Confirmation Act 1994	1994 c. ii	24 March 1994
An Act to confirm a Provisional Order under the Private Legislation Procedure (Scotland) Act 1936, relating to British Railways (No. 2).
	British Railways (No. 2) Order 1994 Provisional Order to empower the British Railways Board to construct works and to purchase or use land; to confer further powers on the Board; and for connected purposes.	
British Railways (No. 3) Order Confirmation Act 1994	1994 c. iii	24 March 1994
An Act to confirm a Provisional Order under the Private Legislation Procedure (Scotland) Act 1936, relating to British Railways (No. 3).
	British Railways (No. 3) Order 1994 Provisional Order to empower the British Railways Board to construct works and to purchase or use land; to confer further powers on the Board; and for connected purposes.	
British Railways Act 1994	1994 c. iv	31 March 1994
An Act to empower the British Railways Board to construct works and to acquire land; to confer further powers on the Board; and for connected purposes.
Church of Scotland (Properties and Investments) Order Confirmation Act 1994	1994 c. v	26 May 1994
An Act to confirm a Provisional Order under the Private Legislation Procedure (Scotland) Act 1936, relating to Church of Scotland (Properties and Investments).
	Church of Scotland (Properties and Investments) Order 1994 Provisional Order to alter the constitution of and to confer further powers on the Church of Scotland Trust; to incorporate the Church of Scotland Investors Trust and to transfer certain moveable property and to authorise the transfer of other property to such trust; to transfer certain heritable property and to authorise the transfer of other property to the Church of Scotland General Trustees; to confer further powers on the Church of Scotland General Trustees; and for other purposes.	
Greater Manchester (Light Rapid Transit System) Act 1994	1994 c. vi	26 May 1994
An Act to empower the Greater Manchester Passenger Transport Executive to construct works and to acquire lands; to confer further powers on the Executive; and for other purposes.
Commons Registration (East Sussex) Act 1994	1994 c. vii	5 July 1994
An Act to make provision for the reconstitution and validation of the registers of common land and of town or village greens maintained under the Commons Registration Act 1965 (Note: Commons Registration Act 1965 (c. 64)) for the County of East Sussex; and for connected purposes.
Dunham Bridge (Amendment) Act 1994	1994 c. viii	5 July 1994
An Act to provide for the amendment of the existing constitution of the Dunham Bridge Company; to authorise the eventual dissolution of the Company and the vesting of its undertaking in a company registered under the Companies Act 1985; (Note: Companies Act 1985 (c. 6)) to provide for the vesting of further land in the Company and for the vesting of exchange land; to provide for new works constructed on the land so vested in the Company and on other land acquired by them to form part of the undertaking; to prescribe the level of tolls recoverable from users of Dunham Bridge and to modify the Transport Charges &c. (Miscellaneous Provisions) Act 1954 (Note: Transport Charges &c. (Miscellaneous Provisions) Act 1954 (2 & 3 Eliz. 2. c. 64)) in its application to the undertaking; to amend or repeal certain of the local statutory provisions applicable to the undertaking; and for related purposes.
London Underground (Green Park) Act 1994	1994 c. ix	5 July 1994
An Act to empower London Underground Limited, for safety purposes and the relief of passenger congestion, to construct works to improve the underground station at Green Park and to acquire lands; and for connected purposes.
Lerwick Harbour Order Confirmation Act 1994	1994 c. x	21 July 1994
An Act to confirm a Provisional Order under the Private Legislation Procedure (Scotland) Act 1936, relating to Lerwick Harbour.
	Lerwick Harbour Order 1994 Provisional Order to extend the limits of the port and harbour of Lerwick, and for connected purposes.	
Croydon Tramlink Act 1994	1994 c. xi	21 July 1994
An Act to empower London Regional Transport and Croydon London Borough Council to provide for the development and operation of a system of light rail transit in the London boroughs of Merton, Sutton, Croydon and Bromley; to authorise the construction of works and the acquisition of lands for that purpose; to confer further powers upon London Regional Transport and Croydon London Borough Council; and for other purposes.
London Local Authorities Act 1994	1994 c. xii	21 July 1994
An Act to confer further powers upon local authorities in London; and for other purposes.
London Docklands Development Corporation Act 1994	1994 c. xiii	21 July 1994
An Act to confer powers on the London Docklands Development Corporation for the management and regulation of certain lands and waters within its area, together with other lands and waters; and for other purposes.
Hill Samuel Bank and United Dominions Trust Act 1994	1994 c. xiv	21 July 1994
An Act to provide for the transfer to and vesting in TSB Bank plc of parts of the undertakings of Hill Samuel Bank Limited and United Dominions Trust Limited; and for connected purposes.
Greater Nottingham Light Rapid Transit Act 1994	1994 c. xv	21 July 1994
An Act to confer on Nottinghamshire County Council and on Nottingham City Council powers for the development and operation of a light rail system of rapid passenger transport in the City of Nottingham and elsewhere in the County of Nottinghamshire; to authorise the construction of works and the acquisition of lands for those purposes; to authorise the said councils to transfer the undertaking established by this Act or any part thereof to Greater Nottingham Rapid Transit Limited or any other person; to confer further powers on the said councils; and for other purposes.
University of London Act 1994	1994 c. xvi	3 November 1994
An Act to make new provision for the making of statutes for the University of London; to repeal certain obsolete or unnecessary enactments; and for connected purposes.

== See also ==
- List of acts of the Parliament of the United Kingdom
