= Police area =

Jurisdiction for territorial police forces in the United Kingdom

A police area is the area for which a territorial police force in the United Kingdom is responsible for policing.

Every location in the United Kingdom has a designated territorial police force with statutory responsibility for providing policing services and enforcing criminal law, which is set out in the various police areas below. Special police forces and other non-territorial constabularies do not have police areas and their respective specialist areas of responsibility are shared with the relevant geographic territorial police force.

Ultimately the chief officer of a territorial police force has primacy over all law enforcement within his police area even if it is within the remit of a special police force such as the British Transport Police on the railway infrastructure, the Ministry of Defence Police on MOD property or a port constabulary on a port.

== History ==
The Metropolitan Police District was the first example of a police area. Police areas were introduced with the passage of the Police Act 1964 and Police (Scotland) Act 1967, when a number of small (mainly county borough) police forces were merged with county ones.

The current system of police areas in England and Wales is set out by Section 1 of the Police Act 1996.

There are 43 police areas in England and Wales, 41 are defined by Schedule 1 of the 1996 act, with 39 in England and 4 in Wales. They may be altered by order of the Home Secretary. While the two other areas stated in the 1996 act, the Metropolitan Police District and the City of London police area, are defined by earlier legislation, Section 76 of the London Government Act 1963 and the City of London Police Act 1839 respectively.

Northern Ireland and Scotland each have only one territorial police force: the Police Service of Northern Ireland (PSNI) and Police Service of Scotland.
