= Kerb crawler =

Person who drives around looking for sex

A kerb crawler (or curb crawler) is a person who drives around areas known for street prostitution, soliciting prostitutes for sexual activity. The act is known as kerb crawling because the person will typically drive very slowly along the kerbside.

Where prostitution is illegal, kerb crawlers are widely regarded as a public nuisance; they help to keep street prostitutes in business in red-light districts and often solicit pedestrians who are not prostitutes for sex. As a result, kerb crawling is illegal in many jurisdictions.

Sting operations in which undercover police wait for kerb crawlers to proposition them are a common method for tackling kerb crawling. Kerb crawling is illegal in Canada, the United Kingdom, the United States, South Korea and India. Police may also collect licence-plate numbers of vehicles that appear to be kerb crawling and may contact their registered owners. Kerb crawling and soliciting in a public place are legal in New Zealand.

== United Kingdom ==
Although prostitution is legal in the United Kingdom, soliciting in a public place is not. Following the recommendations of the 1984 Criminal Law Revision Committee report Prostitution on the Street, the United Kingdom's Sexual Offences Act 1985 introduced an offence of kerb crawling to persistently solicit women for the purposes of prostitution. The Policing and Crime Act 2009 modified the Sexual Offences Act 2003 to redefine the offence and remove the requirement of "persistence".

Soliciting in the UK is a summary-only offence limited to a fine, although in some circumstances, offenders can be disqualified from driving and have their cars impounded. Police in England have the discretion to charge, issue an out-of-court disposal (caution), or even take no further action against offenders, and this depends on local practice. Alternative strategies such as Kerb Crawler Rehabilitation Programmes (KCRP) have been introduced in some areas, such as Leeds, but these programmes are criticised by some.

The Crown Prosecution Service in England and Wales and National Policing Guidelines do not encourage enforcement against prostitutes or customers but rather against those who exploit prostitutes for financial gain (e.g., "pimps").

== See also ==
- Client (prostitution)
- John school
