= Attachment of Earnings Act 1971 =

Act of the Parliament of the United Kingdom

Attachment of Earnings Act 1971 (Note: Section 29(1).)
- Act of Parliament
- Parliament of the United Kingdom
- Long title: An Act to consolidate the enactments relating to the attachment of earnings as a means of enforcing the discharge of monetary obligations.
- Citation: 1971 c. 32
- Territorial extent: England and Wales (Note: Section 29(3).)

Dates
- Royal assent: 12 May 1971
- Commencement: 2 August 1971 (Note: Section 29(4). The Administration of Justice Act 1970 (Commencement No. 4) Order 1971 (SI 1971/834).)

Other legislation
- Amends: See § Repealed enactments
- Repeals/revokes: See § Repealed enactments
- Amended by: Maintenance Orders (Reciprocal Enforcement) Act 1972; Matrimonial Causes Act 1973; Northern Ireland Constitution Act 1973; Social Security Act 1973; Social Security Pensions Act 1975; Children Act 1975; Insolvency Act 1976; Supplementary Benefits Act 1976; Administration of Justice Act 1977; Domestic Proceedings and Magistrates' Courts Act 1978; Merchant Shipping Act 1979; Magistrates' Courts Act 1980; Contempt of Court Act 1981; Criminal Justice Act 1982; Administration of Justice Act 1982; County Courts Act 1984; Social Security Act 1985; Wages Act 1986; Social Security Act 1986; Family Law Reform Act 1987; Dock Work Act 1989; Children Act 1989; Statute Law (Repeals) Act 1989; Courts and Legal Services Act 1990; Maintenance Enforcement Act 1991; Criminal Justice Act 1991; Social Security (Consequential Provisions) Act 1992; Transfer of Functions (Science) Order 1992; Pension Schemes Act 1993; Merchant Shipping Act 1995; Pensions Act 1995; Transfer of Functions (Science) Order 1995; Employment Rights Act 1996; Criminal Procedure and Investigations Act 1996; Reserve Forces Act 1996 (Consequential Provisions etc.) Regulations 1998; Access to Justice Act 1999; Tax Credits Act 2002; Courts Act 2003; Statute Law (Repeals) Act 2004; Civil Partnership Act 2004; Collection of Fines (Final Scheme) Order 2006; Tribunals, Courts and Enforcement Act 2007; Health and Social Care Act 2008; Civil Jurisdiction and Judgments (Maintenance) Regulations 2011; International Recovery of Maintenance (Hague Convention 2007 etc.) Regulations 2012; Crime and Courts Act 2013; Crime and Courts Act 2013 (Family Court: Consequential Provision) Order 2014; Crime and Courts Act 2013 (Family Court: Consequential Provision) (No.2) Order 2014; Social Services and Well-being (Wales) Act 2014 (Consequential Amendments) Regulations 2016; Civil Jurisdiction and Judgments (Amendment) (EU Exit) Regulations 2019; Jurisdiction and Judgments (Family) (Amendment etc.) (EU Exit) Regulations 2019

Status: Amended

Text of statute as originally enacted

Revised text of statute as amended

Text of the Attachment of Earnings Act 1971 as in force today (including any amendments) within the United Kingdom, from legislation.gov.uk.

The Attachment of Earnings Act 1971 (c. 32) is an act of the Parliament of the United Kingdom that consolidated enactments relating to attachment of earnings as a means of enforcing the discharge of monetary obligations in England and Wales.

== Provisions ==
=== Repealed enactments ===
Section 29(2) of the act repealed 3 enactments, listed in schedule 6 to the act.

Enactments repealed by section 29(2)
Citation	Short title	Extent of repeal
6 & 7 Eliz. 2. c. 39	Maintenance Orders Act 1958	Section 9.
6 & 7 Eliz. 2. c. 39	Maintenance Orders Act 1958	In section 20, in subsection (1) the words " or Part II of the Administration of Justice Act 1970 ", the word " or " at the end of paragraph (a), paragraphs (b) and (c) and the words from "and for the purposes " onwards; in subsection (2), the words " Subject to rules of court made by virtue of section 18(3)(c) of the Administration of Justice Act 1970", and the words " and an application to a magistrates' court for an attachment of earnings order, or an order discharging or varying an attachment of earnings order"; and subsections (3), (4), (5) and (7).
6 & 7 Eliz. 2. c. 39	Maintenance Orders Act 1958	In section 23(2), the words " except paragraph (a) of subsection (3) of section 20 ".
1970 c. 31	Administration of Justice Act 1970	Sections 13 to 26.
1970 c. 31	Administration of Justice Act 1970	Section 27(1) and (2).
1970 c. 31	Administration of Justice Act 1970	In section 28— in subsection (1), the definitions of "Act of 1958 ", " administration order ", " the court ", " debtor ", "judgment debt", "relevant adjudication", " the employer", "legal aid contribution order", and the words from " ' maintenance payments' " onwards; and subsections (2) to (5).
1970 c. 31	Administration of Justice Act 1970	Section 29(1) to (4).
1970 c. 31	Administration of Justice Act 1970	Section 30(3) and (4).
1970 c. 31	Administration of Justice Act 1970	In section 53, the words " 24 or ".
1970 c. 31	Administration of Justice Act 1970	In section 54(6), the words " and 27 " and " and 7 ".
1970 c. 31	Administration of Justice Act 1970	Schedules 5, 6 and 7.
1970 c. 55	Family Income Supplements Act 1970	Section 14.
