= Legitimacy Act 1931 =

Oireachtas
- Long title: AN ACT TO AMEND THE LAW RELATING TO CHILDREN BORN OUT OF WEDLOCK.
- Citation: No. 13 of 1931
- Territorial extent: Ireland
- Enacted by: Dáil Éireann
- Enacted by: Seanad Éireann
- Commenced: 19 May 1931
- Status: Current legislation

The Legitimacy Act 1931 (No. 13/1931) is an act created by the Oireachtas of Ireland in 1931. The purpose of the Legitimacy Act 1931 was to amend the law relating to children born out of wedlock.

== Act ==
The fundamental principle of the Legitimacy Act 1931 is exposed in article 1(1):
"Subject to the provisions of this section where the parents of an illegitimate person marry or have married one another, whether before or after the commencement of this Act, the marriage shall, if the father of the illegitimate person was or is at the date of the marriage domiciled in Saorstát Eireann, render that person, if living, legitimate from the commencement of this Act, or from the date of the marriage, whichever is the later.."

The Act allowed children to be legitimised by the subsequent marriage of their parents, provided that neither parent had been married to a third party at the time of the birth or the ten months prior. In those circumstances, the legitimised birth was re-entered in the birth indexes for that year (sometimes many years after the original birth). The original entry would be annotated to refer to the new entry. The Act was similar in purpose to the Legitimacy Act 1926 passed by Westminster.

The Act was sponsored by Frank Fahy a Fianna Fáil TD from Galway and Patrick Little, Fianna Fáil TD for Waterford.
