= Crime and Courts Act 2013 =

Act of the Parliament of the United Kingdom

Crime and Courts Act 2013 (Note: Section 61(1).)
- Act of Parliament
- Parliament of the United Kingdom
- Long title: An Act to establish, and make provision about, the National Crime Agency; to abolish the Serious Organised Crime Agency and the National Policing Improvement Agency; to make provision about the judiciary and the structure, administration, proceedings and powers of courts and tribunals; to make provision about deferred prosecution agreements; to make provision about border control; to make provision about drugs and driving; and for connected purposes.
- Citation: 2013 c. 22
- Introduced by: Theresa May (Commons); Lord Taylor of Holbeach (Lords)
- Territorial extent: The whole of the United Kingdom with the exception of certain provisions in Part 2 and section 57 which extend to England and Wales only, and section 56 and Schedule 22 (drugs and driving) which extend to Great Britain.

Dates
- Royal assent: 25 April 2013
- Commencement: Various (Note: Section 61(2)–(11).)
Other legislation
Amends	Debtors Act 1869; Explosives Act 1875; Commons Act 1876; Bills of Sale Act (1878) Amendment Act 1882; Open Spaces Act 1906; Deeds of Arrangement Act 1914; Government Annuities Act 1929; Administration of Justice (Miscellaneous Provisions) Act 1933; Local Government Act 1948; Administration of Justice Act 1956; Agricultural Marketing Act 1958; Administration of Justice Act 1964; Family Law Reform Act 1969; Administration of Justice Act 1970; Law Reform (Miscellaneous Provisions) Act 1970; Matrimonial Proceedings and Property Act 1970; Courts Act 1971; Attachment of Earnings Act 1971; Land Charges Act 1972; Juries Act 1974; Solicitors Act 1974; House of Commons Disqualification Act 1975; Police Pensions Act 1976; Administration of Justice Act 1977; Rent Act 1977; Protection from Eviction Act 1977; Criminal Law Act 1977; Domestic Proceedings and Magistrates' Courts Act 1978; Judicature (Northern Ireland) Act 1978; Magistrates' Courts Act 1980; Law Reform (Miscellaneous Provisions) (Scotland) Act 1980; Limitation Act 1980; Judicial Pensions Act 1981; Senior Courts Act 1981; Civil Jurisdiction and Judgments Act 1982; Aviation Security Act 1982; County Courts Act 1984; Family Law Reform Act 1987; Official Secrets Act 1989; Security Service Act 1989; Courts and Legal Services Act 1990; Water Industry Act 1991; Water Resources Act 1991; Social Security Contributions and Benefits Act 1992; Social Security Administration Act 1992; Social Security (Consequential Provisions) Act 1992; Landlord and Tenant (Covenants) Act 1995; Criminal Procedure (Scotland) Act 1995; Police Act 1996; Employment Tribunals Act 1996; Arbitration Act 1996; Education Act 1996; Architects Act 1997; Police (Northern Ireland) Act 1998; Human Rights Act 1998; Access to Justice Act 1999; Immigration and Asylum Act 1999; Terrorism Act 2000; Political Parties, Elections and Referendums Act 2000; Land Registration Act 2002; Police Reform Act 2002; Crime (International Co-operation) Act 2003; Domestic Violence, Crime and Victims Act 2004; Horserace Betting and Olympic Lottery Act 2004; Public Audit (Wales) Act 2004; Constitutional Reform Act 2005; Mental Capacity Act 2005; Equality Act 2006; Immigration, Asylum and Nationality Act 2006; Commons Act 2006; National Health Service Act 2006; National Health Service (Wales) Act 2006; Police, Public Order and Criminal Justice (Scotland) Act 2006; Tribunals, Courts and Enforcement Act 2007; Legal Services Act 2007; Criminal Justice and Immigration Act 2008; Human Fertilisation and Embryology Act 2008; Counter-Terrorism Act 2008; Policing and Crime Act 2009; Children, Schools and Families Act 2010; Terrorism Prevention and Investigation Measures Act 2011; Protection of Freedoms Act 2012; Legal Aid, Sentencing and Punishment of Offenders Act 2012
Repeals/revokes	Administration of Justice (Appeals) Act 1934
Amended by	Co-operative and Community Benefit Societies Act 2014; Crime and Courts Act 2013 (National Crime Agency and Proceeds of Crime) (Northern Ireland) Order 2015; Investigatory Powers Act 2016; Policing and Crime Act 2017; Criminal Finances Act 2017; Sanctions and Anti-Money Laundering Act 2018; Sentencing Act 2020; Covert Human Intelligence Sources (Criminal Conduct) Act 2021; Online Safety Act 2023; Economic Crime and Corporate Transparency Act 2023; National Crime Agency (Directed Tasking) Order 2024

Status: Amended

History of passage through Parliament

Text of statute as originally enacted

Revised text of statute as amended

The Crime and Courts Act 2013 (c. 22) is an act of the Parliament of the United Kingdom introduced to the House of Lords in May 2012. Its main purpose is to create the United Kingdom National Crime Agency which replaced the Serious Organised Crime Agency. Part 2 of the act relaxes the rules on filming court proceedings under controlled circumstances, and amends the rules on 'self-defence'.

It also enacts changes to press regulation in response to the Leveson Inquiry into the ethics and behaviour of the media.

== Provisions ==
The act has three parts.

=== Part 1: The National Crime Agency ===
Part 1 has sixteen sections involved in the creation of the National Crime Agency, which the Home Office calls 'a national crime-fighting agency'. The NCA incorporates the Serious Organised Crime Agency, the Child Exploitation and Online Protection Centre and the National Cyber Crime Unit. The Act also abolishes the National Policing Improvement Agency.

Section 13 of Part 1 prohibits any officer of the NCA from calling a strike.

The act allowed for the transfer of responsibility over counterterrorism from the Metropolitan Police Service to the NCA.

=== Part 2: Courts and Justice ===
Part 2 deals with the administration of law courts in the UK, including measures aimed at increasing the numbers of female judges appointed, and amending regulations on the payment of fines. A single County Court and a single Family Court for England and Wales were created by the Act, to replace the previous system in which there were many local county courts and where the family jurisdiction was divided between magistrates (sitting as the family proceedings court), the county courts and the High Court.

Schedule 13 has five parts related to the appointment of judges to the Supreme Court of the United Kingdom. Section 32 enables filming of court proceedings under controlled circumstances. Former Secretary of State for Justice Kenneth Clarke announced in September 2011 that only sentencing would be broadcast. There has been criticism about the change about the potential "Hollywoodisation" of justice following similar liberalisation moves in Scotland.

Section 33 abolishes "scandalising the judiciary" or "scandalising the court" as a form of contempt of court under common law. The offence has not been prosecuted since 1931, although it had been considered for use in 1999.

Section 40 contained a controversial uncommenced provision that would have required publishers of newspapers and other printed media to meet the costs of unsuccessful libel claimants if they did not register with a suitably recognised media regulator, a provision suggested by the Leveson Inquiry. In March 2018, the government announced that they would not commence this provision and seek to repeal it. This was announced at the same time the government announced that they would not authorise the second part of the Leveson Inquiry into media standards and ethics. The Section was repealed without ever having been brought into effect, by Section 50 of the Media Act 2024.

Section 43 amended the law relating to self-defence as a defence to a criminal charge. It introduced into statutory law the so-called "householder defence" by inserting a new sub-section (5A) (and supplementary sub-sections) into section 76 of the Criminal Justice and Immigration Act 2008. This meant that force used against burglars in defence of one's home does not have to be reasonable, provided that it is not "grossly disproportionate." (This section came into force on Royal Assent.)

Section 45 and Schedule 17 of the Act establishes the statutory basis for deferred prosecution agreements under English law. Where previously, attempts to have English courts accept such agreements on the basis of their inherent jurisdiction met with difficulty, post the enactment of this Act, 3 such agreements were concluded in rapid succession. This included agreements with ICBC bank, and most recently in Jan 2017, Rolls-Royce plc.

=== Part 3: Miscellaneous and General ===
This part deals with various matters including the right to appeal immigration rulings whilst resident in the UK and "drug driving" legislation. Section 57 amends sections 5 and 6 of the Public Order Act 1986, replacing “, abusive or insulting” in the places where it occurs with “or abusive”. This change was in response to the 'Reform Section 5' campaign.

== Further developments ==
In December 2012, the Home Secretary, Theresa May, decided to delay the transfer of counterterrorism responsibilities from the Metropolitan Police to the NCA. In 2026, the Home Secretary, Shabana Mahmood announced that the National Crime Agency would merge with the counterterrorism functions of the Metropolitan Police, alongside other organisations and other functions of other organisations, to form a new body called the National Police Service.
