= Administration of Justice Act 1970 =

Act of the Parliament of the United Kingdom

Administration of Justice Act 1970 (Note: Section 54(1).)
- Act of Parliament
- Parliament of the United Kingdom
- Long title: An Act to make further provision about the courts (including assizes), their business, jurisdiction and procedure; to enable a High Court judge to accept appointment as arbitrator or umpire under an arbitration agreement; to amend the law respecting the enforcement of debt and other liabilities; to amend section 106 of the Rent Act 1968; and for miscellaneous purposes connected with the administration of justice.
- Citation: 1970 c. 31
- Territorial extent: England and Wales; Northern Ireland (in part); (Note: Section 54(5)–(6).)

Dates
- Royal assent: 29 May 1970
- Commencement: various (Note: Section 54(4).)
Other legislation
Amends	Debtors Act 1869; Public Records Act 1958; Courts-Martial (Appeals) Act 1968
Amended by	Guardianship of Minors Act 1971; Attachment of Earnings Act 1971; Courts Act 1971; Criminal Justice Act 1972; Costs in Criminal Cases Act 1973; Matrimonial Causes Act 1973; Legal Aid Act 1974; Inheritance (Provision for Family and Dependants) Act 1975; Adoption Act 1976; Statute Law (Repeals) Act 1977; Rent Act 1977; Child Care Act 1980; Magistrates' Courts Act 1980; Judicial Pensions Act 1981; Senior Courts Act 1981; County Courts Act 1984; Family Law Reform Act 1987; Statute Law (Repeals) Act 1989; Law of Property (Miscellaneous Provisions) Act 1994; Pensions Act 1995; Private International Law (Miscellaneous Provisions) Act 1995; Arbitration Act 1996; Courts Act 2003; Statute Law (Repeals) Act 2004; Domestic Violence, Crime and Victims Act 2004; Civil Partnership Act 2004; Constitutional Reform Act 2005; Tribunals, Courts and Enforcement Act 2007; Civil Jurisdiction and Judgments Regulations 2007; Health and Social Care Act 2008; Consumer Protection from Unfair Trading Regulations 2008; Civil Jurisdiction and Judgments (Maintenance) Regulations 2011; International Recovery of Maintenance (Hague Convention 2007 etc.) Regulations 2012; Prevention of Social Housing Fraud Act 2013; Crime and Courts Act 2013; Crime and Courts Act 2013 (Family Court: Consequential Provision) Order 2014; Criminal Justice and Courts Act 2015; Modern Slavery Act 2015; Social Services and Well-being (Wales) Act 2014 (Consequential Amendments) Regulations 2016; Civil Jurisdiction and Judgments (Amendment) (EU Exit) Regulations 2019; Jurisdiction and Judgments (Family) (Amendment etc.) (EU Exit) Regulations 2019; Sentencing Act 2020; Public Service Pensions and Judicial Offices Act 2022; Digital Markets, Competition and Consumers Act 2024; Sentencing Act 2026

Status: Amended

Text of statute as originally enacted

Revised text of statute as amended

Text of the Administration of Justice Act 1970 as in force today (including any amendments) within the United Kingdom, from legislation.gov.uk.

The Administration of Justice Act 1970 (c. 31) is an act of the Parliament of the United Kingdom. Section 11 reforms the Debtors Act 1869 (32 & 33 Vict. c. 62) by further restricting the circumstances in which debtors may be sent to prison. Section 40 includes a number of provisions forbidding creditors such as debt collection agencies from harassing debtors, including:

- Excessive demands for payment
- Falsely claiming that criminal proceedings will follow after failing to pay a debt
- Falsely pretending to be officially authorised to collect payment
- Producing false documents claiming to have some official status that they do not have

Section 36 was enacted to return the law to the position which it was generally thought to be, and applied by the courts since the mid-1930s, before the landmark bar to adjournments applied by the courts since 1962 in the decision of Birmingham Citizens Permanent Building Society v Caunt [1962] which had put an end to a practice under which mortgage possession summonses were adjourned to give the mortgagor an opportunity to pay by instalments. It had intended to restore the position to what it had previously been thought to be. The section did not however cover those mortgages excluding section 103 of the Law of Property Act 1925.

Section 1 transferred certain non-family matters away from what was then called the Probate, Divorce and Admiralty Division and renamed it as the Family Division.

== See also ==
- Administration of Justice Act
