= Family Law Reform Act 1987 =

Act of the Parliament of the United Kingdom

Family Law Reform Act 1987 (Note: Section 34(1).)
- Act of Parliament
- Parliament of the United Kingdom
- Long title: An Act to reform the law relating to the consequences of birth outside marriage; to make further provision with respect to the rights and duties of parents and the determination of parentage; and for connected purposes.
- Citation: 1987 c. 42
- Territorial extent: England and Wales; Scotland (in part); Northern Ireland (in part); (Note: Section 34(4)–(5).)

Dates
- Royal assent: 15 May 1987
- Commencement: various (Note: Section 34(2).)

Other legislation
- Amends: Maintenance Orders (Facilities for Enforcement) Act 1920; Trustee Act 1925; Administration of Estates Act 1925; National Assistance Act 1948; Marriage Act 1949; Maintenance Orders Act 1950; Reserve and Auxiliary Forces (Protection of Civil Interests) Act 1951; Births and Deaths Registration Act 1953; Maintenance Orders Act 1958; Domestic and Appellate Proceedings (Restriction of Publicity) Act 1968; Family Law Reform Act 1969; Children and Young Persons Act 1969; Administration of Justice Act 1970; Guardianship of Minors Act 1971; Attachment of Earnings Act 1971; Maintenance Orders (Reciprocal Enforcement) Act 1972; Matrimonial Causes Act 1973; Guardianship Act 1973; Social Security Act 1975; Children Act 1975; Adoption Act 1976; Domestic Proceedings and Magistrates' Courts Act 1978; Interpretation Act 1978; Child Care Act 1980; Magistrates' Courts Act 1980; Civil Jurisdiction and Judgments Act 1982; Child Abduction and Custody Act 1985; Social Security Act 1986; Family Law Act 1986; See § Repealed enactments
- Repeals/revokes: See § Repealed enactments
- Amended by: Children Act 1989; Social Security (Consequential Provisions) Act 1992; Trusts of Land and Appointment of Trustees Act 1996; Crime and Disorder Act 1998; Child Support, Pensions and Social Security Act 2000; Adoption and Children Act 2002; Constitutional Reform Act 2005; Health and Social Care Act 2008; Human Fertilisation and Embryology Act 2008; Crime and Courts Act 2013; Inheritance and Trustees' Powers Act 2014; Marriage (Same Sex Couples) Act 2013 (Consequential and Contrary Provisions and Scotland) Order 2014; Civil Partnership (Opposite-sex Couples) Regulations 2019

Status: Amended

Text of statute as originally enacted

Revised text of statute as amended

Text of the Family Law Reform Act 1987 as in force today (including any amendments) within the United Kingdom, from legislation.gov.uk.

The Family Law Reform Act 1987 (c. 42) is an act of the Parliament of the United Kingdom that reformed the law relating to the consequences of birth outside marriage in England and Wales.

== Provisions ==
=== Repealed enactments ===
Section 33(4) of the act repealed 26 enactments, listed in schedule 4 to the act.

Citation	Short title	Extent of repeal
11 & 12 Geo. 6. c. 29	National Assistance Act 1948	Section 42(2).
11 & 12 Geo. 6. c. 29	National Assistance Act 1948	Section 44.
14 Geo. 6. c. 37	Maintenance Orders Act 1950	Section 3.
14 Geo. 6. c. 37	Maintenance Orders Act 1950	In section 16(2)(a)—(a) sub-paragraph (iv); (b) the sub-paragraph (vi) inserted by the Children Act 1975; (c) in the sub-paragraph (vi) inserted by the Supplementary Benefits Act 1976, the words from "or section 4 of the Affiliation Proceedings Act 1957" to the end; (d) in sub-paragraph (viii), the words from "or section 4 of the Affiliation Proceedings Act 1957" to the end.
3 & 4 Eliz. 2. c. 18	Army Act 1955	In section 150(5), the words from "references to a sum ordered to be paid" to the end.
3 & 4 Eliz. 2. c. 19	Air Force Act 1955	In section 150(5), the words from "references to a sum ordered to be paid" to the end.
5 & 6 Eliz. 2. c. 53	Naval Discipline Act 1957	In section 101(5), the words "and includes an affiliation order within the meaning of the Affiliation Orders Act 1914".
5 & 6 Eliz. 2. c. 55	Affiliation Proceedings Act 1957	The whole act.
6 & 7 Eliz. 2. c. 39	Maintenance Orders Act 1958	In section 21(1), the words "affiliation order".
7 & 8 Eliz. 2. c. 73	Legitimacy Act 1959	The whole act.
1968 c. 63	Domestic and Appellate Proceedings (Restriction of Publicity) Act 1968	In section 2(1), the word "and" following paragraph (c).
1969 c. 46	Family Law Reform Act 1969	Sections 14 and 15.
1969 c. 46	Family Law Reform Act 1969	Section 17.
1969 c. 46	Family Law Reform Act 1969	Section 27.
1970 c. 31	Administration of Justice Act 1970	In schedule 8, paragraph 5.
1971 c. 3	Guardianship of Minors Act 1971	In section 12B, in subsection (1), the words "in maintaining the minor" and, in subsection (3), the words "of a minor".
1971 c. 3	Guardianship of Minors Act 1971	Section 14 and the heading preceding that section.
1971 c. 32	Attachment of Earnings Act 1971	In schedule 1, paragraph 6.
1972 c. 18	Maintenance Orders (Reciprocal Enforcement) Act 1972	Section 3(3).
1972 c. 18	Maintenance Orders (Reciprocal Enforcement) Act 1972	In section 27(9), the words "section 5(5) of the Affiliation Proceedings Act 1957".
1972 c. 18	Maintenance Orders (Reciprocal Enforcement) Act 1972	In section 30—(a) in subsection (3), the words "the Affiliation Proceedings Act 1957 or", the words "paragraph (b) of section 2(1) of the said Act of 1957 (time for making complaint) or", the words "(provision to the like effect), as the case may be", the words "three years (or" and the words "in the case of a complaint under the said Act of 1924)"; (b) in subsection (5), the words "the said Act of 1957" and the words "as the case may be"; (c) in subsection (6), the words "or an affiliation order under the said Act of 1957".
1972 c. 18	Maintenance Orders (Reciprocal Enforcement) Act 1972	In section 41—(a) subsection (1); (b) in subsection (2A), paragraph (a); (c) in subsection (2B), paragraph (a).
1972 c. 49	Affiliation Proceedings (Amendment) Act 1972	The whole act.
1973 c. 29	Guardianship Act 1973	Section 2(6).
1973 c. 29	Guardianship Act 1973	Section 4(3D).
1974 c. 4	Legal Aid Act 1974	In schedule 1, in part I, paragraph 2.
1975 c. 72	Children Act 1975	In section 34, subsections (3) and (4).
1975 c. 72	Children Act 1975	Section 36(5A).
1975 c. 72	Children Act 1975	Section 45.
1975 c. 72	Children Act 1975	In section 85(2), the words "(which relate to separation agreements between husband and wife)".
1975 c. 72	Children Act 1975	In section 93, subsections (1) and (2).
1975 c. 72	Children Act 1975	In schedule 3, paragraphs 14 and 75(1).
1976 c. 36	Adoption Act 1976	In schedule 3, paragraph 16.
1978 c. 22	Domestic Proceedings and Magistrates' Courts Act 1978	In section 20, subsections (10) and (13).
1978 c. 22	Domestic Proceedings and Magistrates' Courts Act 1978	In section 36(1), paragraph (c).
1978 c. 22	Domestic Proceedings and Magistrates' Courts Act 1978	Section 38(2).
1978 c. 22	Domestic Proceedings and Magistrates' Courts Act 1978	Section 41.
1978 c. 22	Domestic Proceedings and Magistrates' Courts Act 1978	In section 45, subsections (2) and (3).
1978 c. 22	Domestic Proceedings and Magistrates' Courts Act 1978	In schedule 2, paragraphs 30 and 44.
1978 c. 30	Interpretation Act 1978	In schedule 2, in paragraph 4, the words "earlier than the commencement of this Act".
1980 c. 5	Child Care Act 1980	Sections 49 and 50.
1980 c. 5	Child Care Act 1980	In section 52(1), paragraph (b).
1980 c. 5	Child Care Act 1980	In section 54, in subsections (1) and (2), the words "49, 50".
1980 c. 5	Child Care Act 1980	In section 55, subsection (3) and, in subsection (5), the words from "and any jurisdiction conferred by this section in affiliation proceedings" to the end.
1980 c. 5	Child Care Act 1980	In section 87(1), in the definition of "relative", the words from "and includes" to the end.
1980 c. 5	Child Care Act 1980	In schedule 2, paragraphs 4 and 5 and, in paragraph 7, the words "49, 50".
1980 c. 5	Child Care Act 1980	In schedule 5, paragraphs 6 to 8.
1980 c. 43	Magistrates' Courts Act 1980	In section 59(2), the words "an affiliation order".
1980 c. 43	Magistrates' Courts Act 1980	In section 65(1)—(a) in paragraph (b), the words "or section 44"; (b) paragraph (d); (c) in paragraph (i), the words "or section 19"; (d) in paragraph (k), the words "49 or 50".
1980 c. 43	Magistrates' Courts Act 1980	Section 92(3).
1980 c. 43	Magistrates' Courts Act 1980	In section 150(1), the definition of "affiliation order".
1981 c. 54	Supreme Court Act 1981	In schedule 1, in paragraph 3(6)(iii), the words "affiliation or".
1982 c. 24	Social Security and Housing Benefits Act 1982	In schedule 4, paragraph 1.
1986 c. 50	Social Security Act 1986	In section 24, subsections (2) and (3).
1986 c. 50	Social Security Act 1986	Section 25.
