= Legitimacy Act 1959 =

Act of the Parliament of the United Kingdom

Legitimacy Act 1959 (Note: Section 6(1).)
- Act of Parliament
- Parliament of the United Kingdom
- Long title: An Act to amend the Legitimacy Act, 1926, to legitimate the children of certain void marriages, and otherwise to amend the law relating to children born out of wedlock.
- Citation: 7 & 8 Eliz. 2. c. 73
- Territorial extent: England and Wales (Note: Section 6(1).)

Dates
- Royal assent: 29 July 1959
- Commencement: 29 October 1959 (Note: Section 6(3).)
- Repealed: 1 April 1989 (Note: The Family Law Reform Act 1987 (Commencement No. 2) Order 1989 (SI 1989/382).)
Other legislation
Amends	Legitimacy Act 1926; Magistrates' Courts Act 1952
Amended by	Matrimonial Causes Act 1965; Guardianship of Minors Act 1971; Legitimacy Act 1976; Magistrates' Courts Act 1980
Repealed by	Family Law Reform Act 1987

Status: Repealed

Text of statute as originally enacted

The Legitimacy Act 1959 (7 & 8 Eliz. 2. c. 73) was an act of the Parliament of the United Kingdom. It was repealed by the Family Law Reform Act 1987.

== Provisions ==
Prior to the passing of the act, legitimacy was governed by the Legitimacy Act 1926 (16 & 17 Geo. 5. c. 60). Under that act, the marriage of a child's parents after its birth did not legitimise it when one of the parents was married to a third person at the birth of the child. Although the Royal Commission on Marriage and Divorce recommended keeping this on the statute books by a vote of twelve to seven, Section 1 repealed this and allowed a child to be legitimised when his parents married, regardless of their past status. This was retroactive; if a child's parents were married when the act came into force, the child was legitimised.

Section 2 of the act legitimised the children born of void marriages, provided that both or either parents reasonably believed that the marriages were valid and entered into in good faith (such as a marriage below the age of consent, where both wife and husband believed they are above it). Section 2(3) of the act provided also that section 2 applied only where the father of the child was domiciled in England.

== Subsequent developments ==
The whole act was repealed by section 33(4) of, and schedule 4 to, the Family Law Reform Act 1987, which came into force on 1 April 1989.

== Bibliography ==
- Kahn-Freud, O (1960). "Legitimacy Act, 1959". Modern Law Review. 23 (1). Blackwell Publishing. ISSN 0026-7961.
