= Health and Social Care Act 2008 =

Act of the Parliament of the United Kingdom

Health and Social Care Act 2008 (Note: Section 173.)
- Act of Parliament
- Parliament of the United Kingdom
- Long title: An Act to establish and make provision in connection with a Care Quality Commission; to make provision about health care (including provision about the National Health Service) and about social care; to make provision about reviews and investigations under the Mental Health Act 1983; to establish and make provision in connection with an Office of the Health Professions Adjudicator and make other provision about the regulation of the health care professions; to confer power to modify the regulation of social care workers; to amend the Public Health (Control of Disease) Act 1984; to provide for the payment of a grant to women in connection with pregnancy; to amend the functions of the Health Protection Agency; and for connected purposes.
- Citation: 2008 c. 14
- Territorial extent: England and Wales; Scotland (in part); Northern Ireland (in part); (Note: Section 169.)

Dates
- Royal assent: 21 July 2008
- Commencement: Various (Note: Section 170.)
Other legislation
Amends	Administration of Justice Act 1970; Attachment of Earnings Act 1971; House of Commons Disqualification Act 1975; Supplementary Benefits Act 1976; Magistrates' Courts Act 1980; Senior Courts Act 1981; Civil Jurisdiction and Judgments Act 1982; Public Health (Control of Disease) Act 1984; Family Law Reform Act 1987; Courts and Legal Services Act 1990; Social Security Contributions and Benefits Act 1992; Social Security Administration Act 1992; Social Security Contributions and Benefits (Northern Ireland) Act 1992; Social Security Administration (Northern Ireland) Act 1992; Value Added Tax Act 1994; Police Act 1996; Immigration and Asylum Act 1999; Health and Social Care Act 2001; Public Audit (Wales) Act 2004; Constitutional Reform Act 2005; National Health Service Act 2006; National Health Service (Wales) Act 2006; Safeguarding Vulnerable Groups Act 2006
Amended by	Sentencing Act 2020
Relates to	Mental Health Act 1983

Status: Amended

History of passage through Parliament

Text of statute as originally enacted

Revised text of statute as amended

The Health and Social Care Act 2008 (c. 14) is an act of the Parliament of the United Kingdom.

== Synopsis ==
The Act was created on 11 March 2009 with the following regulated activities:

- provision of health care to patients by a National Health Service (NHS) Trust or NHS Foundation Trust.
- provision of ambulance services, for transporting patients for the purpose of treatment by a NHS Trust or a NHS Foundation Trust.
- provision of health care to patients by a Primary Care Trust.
- management of NHS Blood and Transplant, including: supply of blood, supply of stem cells and bone marrow, supply of tissues for transplant or grafting and also the Donor Organs including the matching and allocation.

The Care Quality Commission has the responsibilities to ensure service providers are providing quality care when carrying on the regulated activities.

The act allows for a “suitable person” to receive payments to arrange appropriate social care for someone who is unable to consent.

The Act makes further substantial revisions and repeals to the Public Health (Control of Disease) Act 1984, by section 129, and Schedule 11. These have the effect of repealing, and replacing most of the provisions of Part 2 of the 1984 Act.

In summer 2021, it was proposed by the Second Johnson ministry to mandate that care home staff be required as a condition of employment to maintain COVID-19 vaccination status. On 13 July the House of Lords had poignant questions for Nadhim Zahawi MP, at the time the Minister for Business and Industry and also the Minister for COVID Vaccine Deployment at the DHSC. It was unclear to certain members of the Secondary Legislation Scrutiny Committee just why and on what basis the Health and Social Care Act 2008 (Regulated Activities) (Amendment) (Coronavirus) Regulations 2021 proposed to regulate. Lord German said "we have consistently made clear our view that all key definitions and criteria on which decisions that might affect a person’s welfare or livelihood will be made, should be included in legislation and not in guidance which cannot be subjected to appropriate Parliamentary scrutiny or approval."

== Delegated legislation ==
=== Section 170 – Commencement Orders ===
Orders made under section 170(3) include:

- The Health and Social Care Act 2008 (Commencement No. 1) Order 2008 (S.I. 2008/2214 (C.100))
- The Health and Social Care Act 2008 (Commencement No. 2) Order 2008 (S.I. 2008/2497 (C.106))
- The Health and Social Care Act 2008 (Commencement No. 3) Order 2008 (S.I. 2008/2717 (C.120))
- The Health and Social Care Act 2008 (Commencement No. 4) Order 2008 (S.I. 2008/2994 (C.129))
- The Health and Social Care Act 2008 (Commencement No. 5) Order 2008 (S.I. 2008/3137 (C.136))
- The Health and Social Care Act 2008 (Commencement No. 6, Transitory and Transitional Provisions) Order 2008 (S.I. 2008/3168 (C.143))
- The Health and Social Care Act 2008 (Commencement No. 7) Order 2008 (S.I. 2008/3244 (C.148))
- The Health and Social Care Act 2008 (Commencement No. 8) Order 2009 (S.I. 2009/270 (C.12))
- The Health and Social Care Act 2008 (Commencement No. 9, Consequential Amendments and Transitory, Transitional and Saving Provisions) Order 2009 (S.I. 2009/462 (C.31))
- The Health and Social Care Act 2008 (Commencement No. 9, Consequential Amendments and Transitory, Transitional and Saving Provisions) Amendment Order 2009 (S.I. 2009/580 (C.40))
- The Health and Social Care Act 2008 (Commencement No. 10) Order 2009 (S.I. 2009/1310 (C.71))
- The Health and Social Care Act 2008 (Commencement No. 11) Order 2009 (S.I. 2009/2567 (C.109))
- The Health and Social Care Act 2008 (Commencement No. 12) Order 2009 (S.I. 2009/2862 (C.126))
- The Health and Social Care Act 2008 (Commencement No. 13, Transitory and Transitional Provisions and Electronic Communications) Order 2009 (S.I. 2009/3023 (C.130))
- The Health and Social Care Act 2008 (Commencement No.13, Transitory and Transitional Provisions and Electronic Communications) Amendment Order 2010 (S.I. 2010/47)
- The Health and Social Care Act 2008 (Commencement No. 14) Order 2010 (S.I. 2010/23 (C.3))
- The Health and Social Care Act 2008 (Commencement No. 15, Consequential Amendments and Transitional and Savings Provisions) Order 2010 (S.I. 2010/708 (C.46))
- The Health and Social Care Act 2008 (Commencement No.16, Transitory and Transitional Provisions) Order 2010 (S.I. 2010/807 (C.53))
- The Health and Social Care Act 2008 (Commencement No. 17) Order 2011 (S.I. 2011/986 (W.143) (C.39))
- The Health and Social Care Act 2008 (Commencement No. 1) (Wales) Order 2009 (S.I. 2009/631 (W.57))
- The Health and Social Care Act 2008 (Commencement No. 2 and Transitional Provisions) (Wales) Order 2010 (S.I. 2010/989 (W.98) (C.67))
- The Health and Social Care Act 2008 (Commencement No. 3) (Wales) Order 2010 (S.I. 2010/1457 (W.130) (C.83))
- The Health and Social Care Act 2008 (Commencement No. 4, Transitional and Savings Provisions) (Wales) Order 2010 (S.I. 2010/1547 (W.145) (C.84))

== See also ==
- Halsbury's Statutes
