= Legal Aid Act 1974 =

Act of the Parliament of the United Kingdom

Legal Aid Act 1974 (Note: Section 43(1).)
- Act of Parliament
- Parliament of the United Kingdom
- Long title: An Act to consolidate certain enactments relating to legal aid and legal advice and assistance.
- Citation: 1974 c. 4
- Territorial extent: England and Wales (Note: Section 43(5).)

Dates
- Royal assent: 8 February 1974
- Commencement: 8 May 1974 (Note: Section 43(3). Paragraph 3(e) of part I of schedule 1 also came into force on this date by virtue of the Legal Aid Act 1974 (Commencement No. 1) Order 1974 (SI 1974/709).)
- Repealed: 1 April 1989 (Note: The Legal Aid Act 1988 (Commencement No. 3) Order 1989 (SI 1989/288).)
Other legislation
Amends	See § Repealed enactments
Repeals/revokes	See § Repealed enactments
Amended by	Administration of Justice Act 1977; Domestic Proceedings and Magistrates' Courts Act 1978; Legal Aid Act 1979; Child Care Act 1980; Magistrates' Courts Act 1980; Family Law Reform Act 1987
Repealed by	Legal Aid Act 1988

Status: Repealed

Text of statute as originally enacted

The Legal Aid Act 1974 (c. 4) was an act of the Parliament of the United Kingdom that consolidated enactments related to legal aid and legal advice and assistance in England and Wales.

== Provisions ==
=== Repealed enactments ===
Section 42(1) of the act repealed 18 enactments and revoked 11 instruments, listed in parts I and II of schedule 5 to the act, respectively.

Part I — Enactments repealed
Citation	Short title	Extent of repeal
12, 13 & 14 Geo. 6. c. 51	Legal Aid and Advice Act 1949	The whole act.
5 & 6 Eliz. 2. c. 27	Solicitors Act 1957	Section 74(e).
6 & 7 Eliz. 2. c. 51	Public Records Act 1958	In Schedule 2, the entry relating to section 14 of the Legal Aid and Advice Act 1949.
8 & 9 Eliz. 2. c. 28	Legal Aid Act 1960	The whole act.
1964 c. 30	Legal Aid Act 1964	The whole act.
1966 c. 20	Ministry of Social Security Act 1966	In Schedule 6, paragraph 12.
1967 c. 80	Criminal Justice Act 1967	Part IV.
1967 c. 80	Criminal Justice Act 1967	In section 100(2), the words "except rules under section 82 of this Act".
1967 c. 80	Criminal Justice Act 1967	Section 101(4).
1967 c. 80	Criminal Justice Act 1967	In Schedule 6, paragraph 7.
1969 c. 54	Children and Young Persons Act 1969	Section 33.
1969 c. 54	Children and Young Persons Act 1969	Schedule 1.
1970 c. 31	Administration of Justice Act 1970	Section 9(4).
1970 c. 31	Administration of Justice Act 1970	Section 43.
1970 c. 31	Administration of Justice Act 1970	Schedule 10.
1971 c. 3	Guardianship of Minors Act 1971	In Schedule 1, the entry relating to the Legal Aid and Advice Act 1949.
1971 c. 23	Courts Act 1971	In Schedule 6, paragraph 10.
1971 c. 23	Courts Act 1971	In Schedule 8, paragraph 29, in paragraph 48 the words "73(4)(5), (8), 74(3), 76(4)" and the words "73(3), (3B), 74(6), 76(5)" and paragraph 56.
1972 c. 11	Superannuation Act 1972	Section 18(1).
1972 c. 18	Maintenance Orders (Reciprocal Enforcement) Act 1972	Section 43(1).
1972 c. 50	Legal Advice and Assistance Act 1972	The whole act.
1972 c. 71	Criminal Justice Act 1972	Section 38.
1972 c. 71	Criminal Justice Act 1972	In Schedule 5, in the entry relating to the Criminal Justice Act 1967, paragraphs (e) to (g).
1973 c. 29	Guardianship Act 1973	Section 9(2)(a).
1973 c. 41	Fair Trading Act 1973	Section 43(1)(q).
1973 c. 62	Powers of Criminal Courts Act 1973	In Schedule 5, paragraphs 23 to 25.

Part II — Regulations revoked
Citation	Title	Extent of revocation
SI 1969/1	Legal Aid (Extension of Proceedings) Regulations 1969	The whole instrument.
SI 1970/761	Legal Aid (Extension of Proceedings) Regulations 1970	The whole instrument.
SI 1970/1707	Legal Aid (Financial Conditions) Regulations 1970	The whole instrument.
SI 1971/62	Legal Aid (General) Regulations 1971	Regulation 22(10) and (11).
SI 1971/1904	Legal Aid (Extension of Proceedings) Regulations 1971	The whole instrument.
SI 1972/1973	Legal Aid (Extension of Proceedings) Regulations 1972	The whole instrument.
SI 1972/1974	Legal Aid (Financial Conditions) Regulations 1972	The whole instrument.
SI 1973/535	Legal Advice and Assistance (Financial Conditions) Regulations 1973	The whole instrument.
SI 1973/1716	Legal Aid and Assistance (Financial Conditions) (No. 3) Regulations 1973	The whole instrument.
SI 1973/1782	Legal Aid (Financial Conditions) Regulations 1973	The whole instrument.
SI 1973/1783	Legal Advice and Assistance (Financial Conditions) (No. 2) Regulations 1973	The whole instrument.

== Subsequent developments ==
The whole act was repealed by section 45(2) of, and schedule 6 to, the Legal Aid Act 1988, which came into force on 1 April 1989.
