= Attempted Rape Act 1948 =

Act of the Parliament of the United Kingdom

Attempted Rape Act 1948 (Note: Section 2.)
- Act of Parliament
- Parliament of the United Kingdom
- Long title: An Act to authorise the passing of sentences of penal servitude for attempts to commit rape.
- Citation: 11 & 12 Geo. 6. c. 19
- Territorial extent: England and Wales (Note: Section 1.)

Dates
- Royal assent: 24 March 1948
- Commencement: 24 March 1948 (Note: The Acts of Parliament (Commencement) Act 1793.)
- Repealed: 1 January 1957
Other legislation
Repealed by	Sexual Offences Act 1956

Status: Repealed

Text of statute as originally enacted

The Attempted Rape Act 1948 (11 & 12 Geo. 6. c. 19) was an act of the Parliament of the United Kingdom that increased the maximum sentence for attempted rape from two years' imprisonment to seven years' penal servitude. (Penal servitude was abolished later that year by the Criminal Justice Act 1948, and replaced with imprisonment.) The Attempted Rape Act was repealed and replaced by the Sexual Offences Act 1956 (4 & 5 Eliz. 2. c. 69), which maintained the maximum sentence of seven years' imprisonment until the 1956 act was amended by the Sexual Offences Act 1985, which increased the maximum sentence to life imprisonment.

== Full text ==
1. Punishment for attempted rape.

Where a person is convicted in England or Wales of an attempt to commit rape, the court shall have power to pass a sentence of penal servitude for a term of not more than seven years, in lieu of dealing with him in any other manner in which the court has power to deal with him.

2. Short title.

This Act may be cited as the Attempted Rape Act, 1948.

== Subsequent developments ==
The whole act was repealed for England and Wales by section 51 of, and the fourth schedule to, the Sexual Offences Act 1956 (4 & 5 Eliz. 2. c. 69), which came into force on 1 January 1957.

== Bibliography ==
- Halsbury's Statutes of England, 2nd edition, volume 5. London: Butterworth & Co (Publishers) Ltd (1948), pp. 1132-1133
