= Affiliation Proceedings Act 1957 =

Act of the Parliament of the United Kingdom

Affiliation Proceedings Act 1957 (Note: Section 13(1).)
- Act of Parliament
- Parliament of the United Kingdom
- Long title: An Act to consolidate the enactments relating to bastardy, with corrections and improvements made under the Consolidation of Enactments (Procedure) Act, 1949.
- Citation: 5 & 6 Eliz. 2. c. 55
- Territorial extent: England and Wales (Note: Section 13(2).)

Dates
- Royal assent: 31 July 1957
- Commencement: 1 April 1958 (Note: Section 13(3).)
- Repealed: 1 April 1989 (Note: The Family Law Reform Act 1987 (Commencement No. 2) Order 1989 (SI 1989/382).)
Other legislation
Amends	See § Repealed enactments
Repeals/revokes	See § Repealed enactments
Amended by	Statute Law (Repeals) Act 1974; Domestic Proceedings and Magistrates' Courts Act 1978
Repealed by	Family Law Reform Act 1987

Status: Repealed

Text of statute as originally enacted

The Affiliation Proceedings Act 1957 (5 & 6 Eliz. 2. c. 55) was an act of the Parliament of the United Kingdom that consolidated enactments related to bastardy in England and Wales.

== Provisions ==
=== Repealed enactments ===
Section 12(1) of the act repealed 8 enactments, listed in the schedule to the act.

Citation	Short title	Extent of repeal
7 & 8 Vict. c. 101	Poor Law Amendment Act 1844	Sections five and eight.
8 & 9 Vict. c. 10	Bastardy Act 1845	The whole act.
35 & 36 Vict. c. 65	Bastardy Laws Amendment Act 1872	The whole act.
4 & 5 Geo. 5. c. 6	Affiliation Orders Act 1914	The whole act.
13 & 14 Geo. 5. c. 23	Bastardy Act 1923	The whole act.
19 & 20 Geo. 5. c. 36	Age of Marriage Act 1929	The whole act.
15 & 16 Geo. 6 & 1 Eliz. 2. c. 41	Affiliation Orders Act 1952	The whole act except section four.
15 & 16 Geo. 6 & 1 Eliz. 2. c. 55	Magistrates' Courts Act 1952	Section fifty-one; subsection (4) of section eighty-three.

== Subsequent developments ==
Section 12(1) of, and the schedule to, the act were repealed by section 1 of, and part XI of the schedule to, the Statute Law (Repeals) Act 1974, which came into force on 27 June 1974.

The whole act was repealed by section 33(4) of, and schedule 4 to, the Family Law Reform Act 1987, which came into force on 1 April 1989.
