= Magistrates' Courts Act 1980 =

Act of the Parliament of the United Kingdom

Magistrates' Courts Act 1980 (Note: Section 155(1).)
- Act of Parliament
- Parliament of the United Kingdom
- Long title: An Act to consolidate certain enactments relating to the jurisdiction of, and the practice and procedure before, magistrates' courts and the functions of justices' clerks, and to matters connected therewith, with amendments to give effect to recommendations of the Law Commission.
- Citation: 1980 c. 43
- Territorial extent: England and Wales; Scotland (in part); Northern Ireland (in part); (Note: Section 155(2)–(3) and 155(6).)

Dates
- Royal assent: 1 August 1980
- Commencement: 6 July 1981 (Note: Section 155(7). The Magistrates' Courts Act 1980 (Commencement) Order 1981 (SI 1981/457).)

Other legislation
- Amends: Disorderly Houses Act 1751; Statutory Declarations Act 1835; Deeds of Arrangement Act 1914; Sexual Offences Act 1956; Plant Varieties and Seeds Act 1964; Criminal Justice Act 1967; Theft Act 1968; Attachment of Earnings Act 1971; Misuse of Drugs Act 1971; Immigration Act 1971; Slaughterhouses Act 1974; Solicitors Act 1974; Restrictive Trade Practices Act 1976; Bail Act 1976; Domestic Proceedings and Magistrates' Courts Act 1978; Theft Act 1978; Agricultural Statistics Act 1979; See § Repealed enactments
- Repeals/revokes: See § Repealed enactments
- Amended by: List: Highways Act 1980; Criminal Attempts Act 1981; Aviation Security Act 1982; Insurance Companies Act 1982; Mental Health Act 1983; County Courts Act 1984; Food Act 1984; Housing (Consequential Provisions) Act 1985; Weights and Measures Act 1985; Wages Act 1986; Pilotage Act 1987; Family Law Reform Act 1987; Consumer Protection Act 1987; Coroners Act 1988; Legal Aid Act 1988; Road Traffic (Consequential Provisions) Act 1988; Football Spectators Act 1989; Statute Law (Repeals) Act 1989; Water Consolidation (Consequential Provisions) Act 1991; Social Security (Consequential Provisions) Act 1992; Aggravated Vehicle-Taking Act 1992; Criminal Justice Act 1993; Statute Law (Repeals) Act 1993; Local Government (Wales) Act 1994; Vehicle Excise and Registration Act 1994; Police and Magistrates' Courts Act 1994; Criminal Justice and Public Order Act 1994; Child Support Act 1991 (Consequential Amendments) Order 1994; Magistrates' Courts Fees (Amendment) Order 1994; Jobseekers Act 1995; Criminal Justice (Scotland) Act 1995; Merchant Shipping Act 1995; Criminal Appeal Act 1995; Civil Evidence Act 1995; Reserve Forces Act 1996; Employment Rights Act 1996; Criminal Procedure and Investigations Act 1996; Family Law Act 1996; Local Government Changes for England (Magistrates' Courts) Regulations 1996; Magistrates' Courts (Wales) (Consequences of Local Government Changes) Order 1996; Deregulation (Rag Flock and Other Filling Materials Act 1951) (Repeal) Order 1996; Justices of the Peace Act 1997; Crime (Sentences) Act 1997; Family Law Act 1996 (Modifications of Enactments) Order 1997; Magistrates' Courts (Procedure) Act 1998; Crime and Disorder Act 1998; Tax Credits Act 1999; Football (Offences and Disorder) Act 1999; Access to Justice Act 1999; Youth Justice and Criminal Evidence Act 1999; Child Support, Pensions and Social Security Act 2000; Countryside and Rights of Way Act 2000; State Pension Credit Act 2002; Tax Credits Act 2002; Adoption and Children Act 2002; Enterprise Act 2002; Licensing Act 2003; Courts Act 2003; Sexual Offences Act 2003; Criminal Justice Act 2003; Domestic Violence, Crime and Victims Act 2004; Children Act 2004; Civil Partnership Act 2004; Courts Act 2003 (Consequential Amendments) Order 2004; Constitutional Reform Act 2005; Serious Organised Crime and Police Act 2005; European Communities (Jurisdiction and Judgments in Matrimonial and Parental Responsibility Matters) Regulations 2005; Family Procedure (Modification of Enactments) Order 2005; Childcare Act 2006; Violent Crime Reduction Act 2006; Animal Welfare Act 2006; Armed Forces Act 2006; Collection of Fines (Final Scheme) Order 2006; Criminal Defence Service (Representation Orders and Consequential Amendments) Regulations 2006; Tribunals, Courts and Enforcement Act 2007; Serious Crime Act 2007; Legal Services Act 2007; Civil Jurisdiction and Judgments Regulations 2007; Secretary of State for Justice Order 2007; Criminal Justice and Immigration Act 2008; Statute Law (Repeals) Act 2008; Health and Social Care Act 2008; Human Fertilisation and Embryology Act 2008; Welfare Reform Act 2009; Coroners and Justice Act 2009; Policing and Crime Act 2009; Access to Justice Act 1999 (Destination of Appeals) (Family Proceedings) Order 2009; Children and Families (Wales) Measure 2010; Children, Schools and Families Act 2010; Parental Responsibility and Measures for the Protection of Children (International Obligations) (England and Wales and Northern Ireland) Regulations 2010; Police Reform and Social Responsibility Act 2011; Family Procedure (Modification of Enactments) Order 2011; Civil Jurisdiction and Judgments (Maintenance) (Rules of Court) Regulations 2011; Civil Jurisdiction and Judgments (Maintenance) Regulations 2011; Legal Aid, Sentencing and Punishment of Offenders Act 2012; International Recovery of Maintenance (Hague Convention 2007) (Rules of Court) Regulations 2012; Public Bodies (Abolition of Crown Court Rule Committee and Magistrates' Courts Rule Committee) Order 2012; International Recovery of Maintenance (Hague Convention 2007 etc.) Regulations 2012; Crime and Courts Act 2013; Universal Credit (Consequential, Supplementary, Incidental and Miscellaneous Provisions) Regulations 2013; Anti-social Behaviour, Crime and Policing Act 2014; Criminal Justice and Courts Act 2015; Deregulation Act 2015; Legal Aid, Sentencing and Punishment of Offenders Act 2012 (Fines on Summary Conviction) Regulations 2015; Social Services and Well-being (Wales) Act 2014 (Consequential Amendments) Regulations 2016; Space Industry Act 2018; Courts and Tribunals (Judiciary and Functions of Staff) Act 2018; Criminal Justice (Amendment etc.) (EU Exit) Regulations 2019; Coronavirus Act 2020; Sentencing (Pre-consolidation Amendments) Act 2020; Sentencing Act 2020; Counter-Terrorism and Sentencing Act 2021; Police, Crime, Sentencing and Courts Act 2022; Judicial Review and Courts Act 2022; Crime and Policing Act 2026
- Relates to: Senior Courts Act 1981

Status: Amended

Text of statute as originally enacted

Revised text of statute as amended

Text of the Magistrates' Courts Act 1980 as in force today (including any amendments) within the United Kingdom, from legislation.gov.uk.

The Magistrates' Courts Act 1980 (c. 43) is an act of the Parliament of the United Kingdom. It is a consolidation act. It codifies the procedures applicable in the magistrates' courts of England and Wales and largely replaces the Magistrates' Courts Act 1952 (15 & 16 Geo. 6 & 1 Eliz. 2. c. 55). Part I of the act sets out provisions in relation to the courts' criminal jurisdiction, and Part II in relation to civil proceedings.

== Provisions ==
Section 1 of the act empowers a justice of the peace to issue a summons or arrest warrant alleging the commission of a crime against an identifiable person. Section 127 of the act establishes a six-month limitation period for summary (but not indictable) offences.

== Repealed enactments ==
Section 154(3) of the act repealed 31 enactments, listed in schedule 9 to the act.

Enactments repealed by section 154(3)
Citation	Short title	Extent of repeal
12, 13 & 14 Geo. 6. c. 101	Justices of the Peace Act 1949	Section 15(1), (2), (3), (7), (8) and (9).
15 & 16 Geo. 6 & 1 Eliz. 2. c. 55	Magistrates' Courts Act 1952	The whole act.
5 & 6 Eliz. 2. c. 29	Magistrates' Courts Act 1957	The whole act.
6 & 7 Eliz. 2. c. 39	Maintenance Orders Act 1958	Section 16.
6 & 7 Eliz. 2. c. 39	Maintenance Orders Act 1958	Section 20(6).
7 & 8 Eliz. 2. c. 72	Mental Health Act 1959	In Schedule 7, in Part I, the entry relating to the Magistrates' Courts Act 1952.
7 & 8 Eliz. 2. c. 73	Legitimacy Act 1959	Section 5(2).
9 & 10 Eliz. 2. c. 39	Criminal Justice Act 1961	In section 1(5) the words " and subsections (2) and (3) of section twenty-eight of the Magistrates' Courts Act 1952 ".
9 & 10 Eliz. 2. c. 39	Criminal Justice Act 1961	Section 8(3).
9 & 10 Eliz. 2. c. 39	Criminal Justice Act 1961	In section 41(4), the words " section twenty-eight of the Magistrates' Courts Act 1952".
9 & 10 Eliz. 2. c. 39	Criminal Justice Act 1961	In Schedule 4, the entries relating to sections 28 and 126 of the Magistrates' Courts Act 1952.
9 & 10 Eliz. 2. c. 39	Criminal Justice Act 1961	In Schedule 6, the text of the Magistrates' Courts Act 1952, section 28.
1963 c. 37	Children and Young Persons Act 1963	Section 27.
1964 c. 42	Administration of Justice Act 1964	Section 11.
1964 c. 42	Administration of Justice Act 1964	In Schedule 3, paragraphs 20(2) and 22(3) and (5).
1965 c. 69	Criminal Procedure (Attendance of Witnesses) Act 1965	In Schedule 2, in Part I, the entry relating to the Magistrates' Courts Act 1952.
1967 c. 80	Criminal Justice Act 1967	Sections 1 to 6.
1967 c. 80	Criminal Justice Act 1967	Section 19.
1967 c. 80	Criminal Justice Act 1967	In section 20, the words " or section 28 or 29 of the Magistrates' Courts Act 1952 (committal for sentence)".
1967 c. 80	Criminal Justice Act 1967	Section 24.
1967 c. 80	Criminal Justice Act 1967	Section 26.
1967 c. 80	Criminal Justice Act 1967	Sections 28 to 30.
1967 c. 80	Criminal Justice Act 1967	In section 33, the words from the beginning to " that section and ".
1967 c. 80	Criminal Justice Act 1967	In section 36(1), the definitions of " broadcast " and " publish ".
1967 c. 80	Criminal Justice Act 1967	Sections 44, 44A and 45.
1967 c. 80	Criminal Justice Act 1967	In section 50, the words from the beginning to " Part of that Act".
1967 c. 80	Criminal Justice Act 1967	Section 56(4).
1967 c. 80	Criminal Justice Act 1967	In section 89(1), the words " 2 or ".
1967 c. 80	Criminal Justice Act 1967	In section 90(1) the words " an order under section 44(8) or ".
1967 c. 80	Criminal Justice Act 1967	Section 94.
1967 c. 80	Criminal Justice Act 1967	In section 106(2)(6), the figure " 3 ".
1967 c. 80	Criminal Justice Act 1967	In Schedule 6, paragraphs 9 to 13 and 17 to 20.
1968 c. 69	Justices of the Peace Act 1968	In Schedule 3, paragraph 8.
1969 c. 54	Children and Young Persons Act 1969	Section 6.
1969 c. 54	Children and Young Persons Act 1969	Section 10(3).
1969 c. 54	Children and Young Persons Act 1969	Section 61.
1969 c. 54	Children and Young Persons Act 1969	In Schedule 4, paragraph 4.
1970 c. 31	Administration of Justice Act 1970	Section 12.
1970 c. 31	Administration of Justice Act 1970	In section 28(1), the definitions of " the Act of 1952 " and " magistrates' court maintenance order ".
1970 c. 31	Administration of Justice Act 1970	Section 30(1) and (2) as respects section 12.
1970 c. 31	Administration of Justice Act 1970	Section 41(6).
1970 c. 31	Administration of Justice Act 1970	Section 42.
1970 c. 31	Administration of Justice Act 1970	Section 50.
1970 c. 31	Administration of Justice Act 1970	In section 51, subsection (1), and in subsection (3) the definition of " the Act of 1952 ".
1971 c. 23	Courts Act 1971	Section 7(1).
1971 c. 23	Courts Act 1971	In Schedule 8, paragraph 34, in paragraph 48(b) in the words " 56(4)(6) " the word " (4) ", and paragraph 52.
1971 c. 23	Courts Act 1971	In Schedule 9, in Part I, the entry relating to the Magistrates' Courts Act 1952.
1972 c. 18	Maintenance Orders (Reciprocal Enforcement) Act 1972	Section 22(2)(6).
1972 c. 70	Local Government Act 1972	In Schedule 27, paragraph 16.
1972 c. 71	Criminal Justice Act 1972	Section 41.
1972 c. 71	Criminal Justice Act 1972	Sections 44 and 45.
1972 c. 71	Criminal Justice Act 1972	Section 50.
1972 c. 71	Criminal Justice Act 1972	In Schedule 5, the entries relating to the Magistrates' Courts Act 1952 and the entry relating to section 6(1) of the Children and Young Persons Act 1969.
1973 c. 14	Costs in Criminal Cases Act 1973	In Schedule 1, paragraph 1.
1973 c. 29	Guardianship Act 1973	Section 9(2)(A).
1973 c. 38	Social Security Act 1973	In Schedule 27, in paragraph 85, the words " and 12(2)(6)" and " (in each place) ".
1973 c. 62	Powers of Criminal Courts Act 1973	Section 35(5).
1973 c. 62	Powers of Criminal Courts Act 1973	In Schedule 5, paragraphs 4, 5, 7, 16 and 34.
1974 c. 4	Legal Aid Act 1974	In Schedule 4, paragraph 3.
1975 c. 21	Criminal Procedure (Scotland) Act 1975	Section 326(2).
1975 c. 21	Criminal Procedure (Scotland) Act 1975	In section 463(1)(6), the words " 326(2)".
1976 c. 63	Bail Act 1976	In Schedule 2, paragraphs 14 to 29 and 35.
1977 c. 45	Criminal Law Act 1977	Section 14.
1977 c. 45	Criminal Law Act 1977	In section 15, in subsection (1), paragraph (b) and the word " and " immediately preceding it, and, in subsection (3), paragraph (a).
1977 c. 45	Criminal Law Act 1977	Section 16.
1977 c. 45	Criminal Law Act 1977	Sections 18 to 27.
1977 c. 45	Criminal Law Act 1977	In section 28, subsections (1) to (7) and in subsection (8) the words from " and subsection (2) above " to the end.
1977 c. 45	Criminal Law Act 1977	Section 29.
1977 c. 45	Criminal Law Act 1977	Section 30(4).
1977 c. 45	Criminal Law Act 1977	Section 32(2).
1977 c. 45	Criminal Law Act 1977	Sections 34 and 35.
1977 c. 45	Criminal Law Act 1977	In section 36, subsections (2) to (8) and in subsection (9) the definitions of " guardian " and " the statutory restrictions upon the imprisonment of young offenders ".
1977 c. 45	Criminal Law Act 1977	Sections 41 and 42.
1977 c. 45	Criminal Law Act 1977	Section 45.
1977 c. 45	Criminal Law Act 1977	In section 58, subsections (1), (4) and (6).
1977 c. 45	Criminal Law Act 1977	Sections 59 to 61.
1977 c. 45	Criminal Law Act 1977	In section 63(2), in the entry relating to section 65(4) and Schedule 12 so far as they relate to the Criminal Justice Act 1967, the words " 3 and ".
1977 c. 45	Criminal Law Act 1977	In section 65(10)(e) the words from " and the provisions " to " all such places (except Scotland)".
1977 c. 45	Criminal Law Act 1977	Schedule 2.
1977 c. 45	Criminal Law Act 1977	Schedule 3.
1977 c. 45	Criminal Law Act 1977	Schedule 4.
1977 c. 45	Criminal Law Act 1977	In Schedule 5, paragraph 1(2)(a) and (b).
1977 c. 45	Criminal Law Act 1977	In Schedule 7, paragraph 1.
1977 c. 45	Criminal Law Act 1977	Schedule 8.
1977 c. 45	Criminal Law Act 1977	In Schedule 12, the entries relating to the Magistrates' Courts Act 1952, the entries relating to sections 3, 24, 44(5) and 44A of the Criminal Justice Act 1967, and paragraphs 2 and 3 of the entries relating to the Criminal Justice Act 1972.
1977 c. 45	Criminal Law Act 1977	In Schedule 14, paragraph 2, in paragraph 3(1) the words " or 2 ", paragraph 4, and in paragraph 5 the words " (other than section 29 or any provision mentioned in paragraph 4 above)".
1978 c. 22	Domestic Proceedings and Magistrates' Courts Act 1978	Sections 75 to 85.
1978 c. 22	Domestic Proceedings and Magistrates' Courts Act 1978	In Schedule 1, in paragraph 5 the words "or in any of sections 79 to 82 ", paragraph 6 and paragraph 7.
1978 c. 22	Domestic Proceedings and Magistrates' Courts Act 1978	In Schedule 2, paragraphs 15 and 21.
1978 c. 37	Protection of Children Act 1978	Section 2(2).
1979 c. 55	Justices of the Peace Act 1979	In Schedule 2, paragraphs 7 to 9 and paragraph 14.
1980 c. 5	Child Care Act 1980	In Schedule 5, paragraph 5.
1980 c. 11	Protection of Trading Interests Act 1980	In section 8(5), the words from " together with " to the end.

== See also ==
- Magistrates' Courts Act
- Magistrates' court
- Magistrates' court (England and Wales)
