= Law Reform (Husband and Wife) (Scotland) Act 1984 =

Act of the Parliament of the United Kingdom

Law Reform (Husband and Wife) (Scotland) Act 1984 (Note: Section 10(1).)
- Act of Parliament
- Parliament of the United Kingdom
- Long title: An Act to amend the law relating to husband and wife and breach of promise of marriage and for connected purposes.
- Citation: 1984 c. 15
- Territorial extent: Scotland (Note: Section 10(3).)

Dates
- Royal assent: 24 May 1984
- Commencement: 24 July 1984 (Note: Section 10(2).)

Other legislation
- Amends: Court of Session Act 1850; Conjugal Rights (Scotland) Amendment Act 1861; Married Women’s Property (Scotland) Act 1877; Maintenance Orders (Reciprocal Enforcement) Act 1972; Civil Jurisdiction and Judgments Act 1982; See § Repealed enactments
- Repeals/revokes: See § Repealed enactments
- Amended by: Family Law (Scotland) Act 1985; Children (Scotland) Act 1995

Status: Amended

Text of statute as originally enacted

Revised text of statute as amended

Text of the Law Reform (Husband and Wife) (Scotland) Act 1984 as in force today (including any amendments) within the United Kingdom, from legislation.gov.uk.

The Law Reform (Husband and Wife) (Scotland) Act 1984 (c. 15) is an act of the Parliament of the United Kingdom that amended the law relating to husband and wife and breach of promise of marriage in Scotland.

== Provisions ==
The act abolished several archaic rules of Scots law relating to husband and wife. Sections 1 and 2 abolished actions for breach of promise of marriage and actions of adherence and enticement respectively. Sections 3 to 8 abolished miscellaneous rules, including curatory of a minor spouse by the other spouse, the husband's right to choose the matrimonial home, certain rules relating to antenuptial marriage contracts, the husband's liability for his wife's debts incurred before marriage, the doctrine of praepositura, and the husband's liability for his wife's judicial expenses in actions in which he was neither a party nor dominus litis. Consequential amendments to related legislation are set out in schedule 1 to the act.

The act was preceded by the Scottish Law Commission's Report on Outdated Rules in the Law of Husband and Wife (Scot. Law Com. No. 76, 1983).

=== Repealed enactments ===
Section 9(2) of the act repealed 5 enactments, listed in schedule 2 to the act.

Citation	Short title	Extent of repeal
24 & 25 Vict. c. 86	Conjugal Rights (Scotland) Amendment Act 1861	Sections 1 to 5.
37 & 38 Vict. c. 31	Conjugal Rights (Scotland) Amendment Act 1874	The whole act.
40 & 41 Vict. c. 29	Married Women's Property (Scotland) Act 1877	The whole act.
10 & 11 Geo. 5. c. 64	Married Women's Property (Scotland) Act 1920	Section 2.
6 & 7 Eliz. 2. c. 40	Matrimonial Proceedings (Children) Act 1958	Subsection (2) of section 9.
