= Civil Partnership Act 2004 =

Act of the Parliament of the United Kingdom

Civil Partnership Act 2004 (Note: Section 264.)
- Act of Parliament
- Parliament of the United Kingdom
- Long title: An Act to make provision for and in connection with civil partnership.
- Citation: 2004 c. 33
- Territorial extent: United Kingdom (Note: Section 262.)

Dates
- Royal assent: 18 November 2004
- Commencement: Various (Note: Section 263.)
Other legislation
Amends	Life Assurance Act 1774; Greenwich Hospital Act 1865; Pensions Commutation Act 1871; Explosive Substances Act 1883; Greenwich Hospital Act 1883; Naval Medical Compassionate Fund Act 1915; Greenwich Hospital Act 1942; Greenwich Hospital Act 1947; Polish Resettlement Act 1947; Statistics of Trade Act 1947; Pharmacy Act 1954; Theft Act 1968; Employers' Liability (Compulsory Insurance) Act 1969; Administration of Justice Act 1970; Attachment of Earnings Act 1971; Criminal Damage Act 1971; Immigration Act 1971; Theatres Trust Act 1976; Fatal Accidents Act 1976; Presumption of Death (Scotland) Act 1977; Marriage (Scotland) Act 1977; Rent Act 1977; Protection from Eviction Act 1977; Criminal Law Act 1977; Domestic Proceedings and Magistrates' Courts Act 1978; Judicature (Northern Ireland) Act 1978; Protection of Children Act 1978; Adoption (Scotland) Act 1978; Magistrates' Courts Act 1980; Forgery and Counterfeiting Act 1981; Senior Courts Act 1981; Forfeiture Act 1982; Dentists Act 1984; Housing Associations Act 1985; Debtors (Scotland) Act 1987; Airports Act 1986; Criminal Justice Act 1988; Opticians Act 1989; Courts and Legal Services Act 1990; Social Security Contributions and Benefits Act 1992; Social Security Administration Act 1992; Social Security Contributions and Benefits (Northern Ireland) Act 1992; Social Security Administration (Northern Ireland) Act 1992; Pension Schemes (Northern Ireland) Act 1993; Crofters (Scotland) Act 1993; Agricultural Tenancies Act 1995; Jobseekers Act 1995; Immigration and Asylum Act 1999; Sexual Offences (Amendment) Act 2000; Land Registration Act 2002
Amended by	Immigration, Asylum and Nationality Act 2006; Electoral Administration Act 2006; Safeguarding Vulnerable Groups Act 2006; Law Reform (Miscellaneous Provisions) (Northern Ireland) Order 2006; Mental Health Act 2007; Child Maintenance and Other Payments Act 2008; Presumption of Death Act (Northern Ireland) 2009; Charities Act 2011; Presumption of Death Act 2013; Marriage (Same Sex Couples) Act 2013; Co-operative and Community Benefit Societies Act 2014; Civil Partnerships, Marriages and Deaths (Registration etc) Act 2019; Marriage and Civil Partnership (Minimum Age) Act 2022; Employment Rights Act 2025

Status: Amended

Text of statute as originally enacted

Revised text of statute as amended

The Civil Partnership Act 2004 (Note: Scottish Gaelic: Achd Com-pàirteachasan Sìobhalta 2004, pronounced [ˈaxk kʰɔmˈpʰaːrˠʃtʲəxəs̪ən ˈʃiːvəl̪ˠt̪ə]; Scots: Ceevil Pairtnery Act 2004, pronounced [ˈsiːvɪl ˈpeːrtnəri ˈɑk(t)].) (c. 33) is an act of the Parliament of the United Kingdom, introduced by the Labour government, which grants civil partnerships in the United Kingdom the rights and responsibilities very similar to those in civil marriage. Initially the act permitted only same-sex couples to form civil partnerships. This was altered to include opposite-sex couples in 2019. Civil partners are entitled to the same property rights as married couples, the same exemption as married couples regarding social security and pension benefits, and also the ability to exercise parental responsibility for a partner's children, as well as responsibility for reasonable maintenance of one's partner and their children, tenancy rights, full life insurance recognition, next-of-kin rights in hospitals, and others. There is a formal process for dissolving civil partnerships, akin to divorce.

== Legislative passage ==
The Act was announced in the Queen's Speech at the start of the 2003/2004 legislative session, and its full text was revealed on 31 March 2004. It received royal assent on 18 November 2004 and came into force on 5 December 2005, allowing the first couples to form civil partnerships 15 days later. Confusion regarding the interpretation of the Act led to registrations being accepted from 19 December in Northern Ireland, 20 December in Scotland and 21 December in England and Wales. The Scottish Parliament voted in favour of a Legislative Consent Motion allowing Westminster to legislate for Scotland in this Act.

=== Political opposition and support ===
The Bill was backed by the Labour Party, the Liberal Democrats, Plaid Cymru, the SNP and the SDLP. It was opposed by the DUP and the UUP. Conservative Party MPs were split on the issue, and the party leadership did not issue a whip mandating MPs to take a particular stance on the Bill, instead allowing its MPs a free vote. This decision was described by some in the British media as an attempt to demonstrate a shift to a more inclusive, centrist approach under the leadership of Michael Howard, and as a departure from the alleged active opposition to LGBT rights under the leadership of Iain Duncan Smith. As party leader, Duncan Smith had imposed a three-line whip against the Adoption and Children Bill, mandating all Conservative MPs to vote against extending adoption rights to same-sex couples. Conservative MPs split 67 in favour to 37 against at the second reading, and 43 in favour to 39 against at the third reading. High-profile Conservative MPs who voted against the Civil Partnerships Bill included Iain Duncan Smith, Ann Widdecombe, Bob Spink and Peter Lilley. Those who voted in favour included David Cameron, George Osborne and party leader Michael Howard. Around 30 Conservative MPs did not participate in any of the votes.

=== Amendments ===
An amendment tabled by Conservative MP Edward Leigh proposed to extend the property and pension rights afforded by civil partnerships to siblings who had lived together for more than 12 years. This was opposed by many backers of the bill, such as frontbench Conservative MP Alan Duncan, who considered it a wrecking amendment. Leigh himself was an opponent of the Civil Partnerships bill, and voted against it at the second reading. The amendment was backed by Norman Tebbit and the Christian Institute, which paid for a full-page advert in favour of the amendment in The Times newspaper. Labour and the Liberal Democrats issued a whip against the Leigh Amendment, and only two MPs from each party rebelled to vote in favour of it.

On 24 June 2004, during the discussion at the report stage in the House of Lords, Conservative peer Baroness O'Cathain moved an amendment to extend eligibility for civil partnership to blood relatives who had lived together for a minimum period of time. This amendment was passed in the Lords by 148 to 130, a majority of 18. Like the Leigh amendment, opponents considered the O'Cathain amendment to be a wrecking amendment, and like Leigh, O'Cathain herself voted against the Civil Partnerships Bill. Labour Peer Baron Alli, said the amendment was "ill-conceived and does nothing other than undermine the purpose of the bill", while the gay rights group Stonewall said the amendment was "unworkable and undermined hundreds of years of family law".

The House of Commons later voted 381–74 to remove this amendment, and sent the revised Bill back to the Lords for reconsideration. On 17 November, the Lords accepted the Commons version by a vote of 251 to 136; the bill received royal assent the next day.

== Legal process to form a civil partnership in the UK ==
To form a civil partnership in the UK, both parties must be over the age of 16, not already in a civil partnership or marriage, and not be within the prohibited degrees of relationship. If of the age of 16 or 17, the consent of the individual's parent or guardian is required, except in Scotland, where marriages and civil partnerships can take place from the age of 16 with no need for parental consent.

From 2004 to 2019 both parties to a partnership also had to be of the same sex. This requirement was removed by Parliament in March 2019, and since 2 December 2019 couples irrespective of sex can register their intent to form a civil partnership.

To complete the registration process, the couple must each give notice of their intention to the registry office. After 15 days they can complete the registration process. The couple can also have a ceremony if they choose but this is not a requirement of the Act. The first date on which notice could be given was 5 December 2005 and the first registration was on 21 December 2005. The 15-day notice period allows the registrar to check that the couple is eligible to go ahead with the registration.

=== Expansion of civil partnerships to opposite-sex couples ===
In June 2018, the Supreme Court ruled in the Steinfeld–Keidan case that restricting civil partnerships to same-sex couples was discriminatory and mandated that the Government change the law, although did not set a timeline for doing so. In response, the Prime Minister announced in October 2018 that civil partnerships would be opened to heterosexual couples. Legislation that requires the Secretary of State to issue regulations amending the Civil Partnership Act, so that opposite-sex couples may enter into civil partnerships, passed the Parliament on 15 March and received royal assent on 26 March 2019. The legislation was enacted on 26 May 2019 in the form of the Civil Partnerships, Marriages and Deaths (Registration etc) Act 2019. The regulations came into effect on 2 December 2019, the date on which opposite-sex couples could register their intent to form a civil partnership. This expansion of civil partnerships to opposite-sex couples applies only in England and Wales, and not in Scotland or Northern Ireland. In Northern Ireland, civil partnerships were extended to opposite-sex couples by The Marriage (Same-sex Couples) and Civil Partnership (Opposite-sex Couples) (Northern Ireland) Regulations 2019.

== Schedule 20 ==
Schedule 20 recognises certain overseas unions as equivalent to civil partnerships under the laws of the United Kingdom. Same-sex couples who have entered into those unions are automatically recognised in the United Kingdom as civil partners. In England and Wales, overseas marriages (but not other types of relationship) are automatically recognised as marriages by the Marriage (Same Sex Couples) Act 2013; the same is true in Scotland by the Marriage and Civil Partnership (Scotland) Act 2014, and in Northern Ireland by the Marriage (Same-sex Couples) and Civil Partnership (Opposite-sex Couples) (Northern Ireland) Regulations 2019 (SI 2019/1514).

Schedule 20 is subject to adjustment, and additional overseas relationships may be added as more jurisdictions across the world bring in civil partnership or same-sex marriage legislation. On 5 December 2005, the original schedule of the 2004 act was amended to include several other countries and states. On 31 January 2013, a further 50 types of overseas relationship were added to the schedule. Relationships not specified in the schedule may also recognised as civil partnerships if they meet the conditions of section 214 of the act, therefore many of the unions listed below as not listed in schedule 20 may nonetheless be recognised.

=== Overseas relationships recognised under Schedule 20, as amended ===
- Andorra: unió estable de parella (stable couple union)
- Argentina: marriage
  - Buenos Aires: unión civil (civil union)
- Australia
  - Australian Capital Territory: civil partnership
  - New South Wales: registered partnership
  - Queensland: registered relationship
  - Tasmania: significant relationship
  - Victoria: registered partnership
- Austria: eingetragene Partnerschaft (registered partnership)
- Belgium: marriage, cohabitation légale/wettelijke samenwoning/gesetzliches Zusammenwohnen (statutory cohabitation)
- Brazil: marriage, união estável (stable union)
- Canada: marriage (Note: Canada and its provinces also extend significant spousal rights to unregistered or de facto partners. But section 212 of the Act describes the foreign relationships that are eligible for recognition as those that are "registered" in another country, so unregistered or de facto partners arguably cannot satisfy the general conditions for recognition in the United Kingdom under section 214 of the Act.)
  - Manitoba: common-law relationship
  - Nova Scotia: domestic partnership
  - Quebec union civile/civil union
- Colombia: unión de hecho (de facto union)
- Czech Republic: registrované partnertsví (registered partnership)
- Denmark: marriage, registreret partnerskab (registered partnership)
- Ecuador: unión civil (civil union)
- Finland: rekisteröity parisuhde/registrerad partnerskap (registered partnership)
- France: pacte civil de solidarité (civil solidarity pact)
- Germany: Lebenspartnerschaft (life partnership)
- Greenland: nalunaarsukkamik inooqatigiinneq/registreret partnerskab (registered partnership)
- Gibraltar: civil partnership
- Hungary: bejegyzett élettársi kapcsolat (registered partnership)
- Iceland: marriage, staðfesta samvist (confirmed cohabitation)
- Ireland: civil partnership
- Isle of Man: civil partnership
- Jersey: civil partnership
- Liechtenstein: eingetragene Partnerschaft (registered partnership)
- Luxembourg: partenariat enregistré/eingetragene Partnerschaft (registered partnership)
- Mexico
  - Coahuila: pacto civil de solidaridad (civil solidarity pact)
  - Mexico City: marriage, sociedad de convivencia
- Netherlands: marriage, geregistreerd partnerschap (registered partnership)
- New Zealand: civil union
- Norway: marriage, registrert partnerskap (registered partnership)
- Portugal: marriage
- Slovenia: istospolne partnerske skupnosti (registered partnership)
- South Africa: marriage, civil partnership
- Spain: marriage
- Sweden: marriage, registrerat partnerskap (registered partnership)
- Switzerland: eingetragene Partnerschaft/partnenariat enregistré/unione domestica registrata (registered partnership/registered domestic union)
- United States:
  - California: marriage, domestic partnership
  - Colorado: designated beneficiary relationship
  - Connecticut: marriage, civil union (Note: Civil unions are no longer performed in Connecticut, where the 2008 act creating same-sex marriage repealed the civil union provisions and converted all Connecticut civil unions to marriages on 1 October 2010.)
  - Delaware: civil union
  - District of Columbia: marriage
  - Hawaii: civil union, reciprocal beneficiary relationship
  - Illinois: civil union
  - Iowa: marriage
  - Maine: domestic partnership
  - Massachusetts: marriage
  - Nevada: domestic partnership
  - New Hampshire: marriage
  - New Jersey: civil union, domestic partnership
  - New York: marriage
  - Oregon: domestic partnership
  - Rhode Island: civil union
  - Vermont: marriage, civil union
  - Washington: domestic partnership
  - Wisconsin: domestic partnership
- Uruguay: unión concubinaria (cohabitation union)

=== Unions adopted since Schedule 20 last amended ===
The following unions were created after Schedule 20 was last updated:

- France: marriage
- Ireland: marriage
- New Zealand: marriage
- United States: marriage (federal)
- Uruguay: marriage
- Isle of Man: marriage
- Pitcairn Islands: marriage

== See also ==
- LGBTQ rights in the United Kingdom
- Marriage (Same Sex Couples) Act 2013
- Marriage and Civil Partnership (Scotland) Act 2014
