= Civil Jurisdiction and Judgments Act 1982 =

Act of the Parliament of the United Kingdom transposing 1968 Brussels Convention

Civil Jurisdiction and Judgments Act 1982 (Note: Section 55.)
- Act of Parliament
- Parliament of the United Kingdom
- Long title: An Act to make further provision about the jurisdiction of courts and tribunals in the United Kingdom and certain other territories and about the recognition and enforcement of judgments given in the United Kingdom or elsewhere; to provide for the modification of certain provisions relating to legal aid; and for connected purposes.
- Citation: 1982 c. 27
- Territorial extent: United Kingdom (Note: Section 52.)

Dates
- Royal assent: 13 July 1982
- Commencement: various (Note: Section 53.)
Other legislation
Amends	Law Reform (Miscellaneous Provisions) (Scotland) Act 1940; Protection of Trading Interests Act 1980; See § Repealed enactments
Repeals/revokes	See § Repealed enactments
Amended by	Law Reform (Husband and Wife) (Scotland) Act 1984; Law Reform (Miscellaneous Provisions) (Scotland) Act 1985; Drug Trafficking Offences Act 1986; Legal Aid (Scotland) Act 1986; Family Law Reform Act 1987; Legal Aid Act 1988; Age of Legal Capacity (Scotland) Act 1991; Trade Marks Act 1994; Drug Trafficking Act 1994; Criminal Justice (Scotland) Act 1995; Merchant Shipping Act 1995; Children (Scotland) Act 1995; Criminal Procedure (Consequential Provisions) (Scotland) Act 1995; Children (Northern Ireland) Order 1995; Children (Northern Ireland Consequential Amendments) Order 1995; Arbitration Act 1996; Family Law Act 1996; Petroleum Act 1998; Scotland Act 1998; Access to Justice Act 1999; Civil Jurisdiction and Judgments Act 1982 (Amendment) Order 2000; Proceeds of Crime Act 2002; Courts Act 2003; Proceeds of Crime Act 2002 (Investigations in different parts of the United Kingdom) Order 2003; Pesticides (Maximum Residue Levels in Crops, Food and Feeding Stuffs) (Amendment) (No. 3) Regulations (Northern Ireland) 2003; Statute Law (Repeals) Act 2004; Constitutional Reform Act 2005; Railways (Convention on International Carriage by Rail) Regulations 2005; Bankruptcy and Diligence etc. (Scotland) Act 2007; Serious Crime Act 2007; Civil Jurisdiction and Judgments Regulations 2007; Health and Social Care Act 2008; Policing and Crime Act 2009; Access to Justice Act 1999 (Destination of Appeals) (Family Proceedings) Order 2009; Civil Jurisdiction and Judgments Regulations 2009; Third Parties (Rights against Insurers) Act 2010; Northern Ireland Act 1998 (Devolution of Policing and Justice Functions) Order 2010; Civil Jurisdiction and Judgments (Maintenance) (Rules of Court) Regulations 2011; Civil Jurisdiction and Judgments (Maintenance) Regulations 2011; International Recovery of Maintenance (Hague Convention 2007) (Rules of Court) Regulations 2012; Treaty of Lisbon (Changes in Terminology or Numbering) Order 2012; International Recovery of Maintenance (Hague Convention 2007 etc.) Regulations 2012; Crime and Courts Act 2013; Courts Reform (Scotland) Act 2014; Civil Jurisdiction and Judgments (Amendment) Regulations 2014; Serious Crime Act 2015; Justice Act (Northern Ireland) 2015; Courts Reform (Scotland) Act 2014 (Consequential Provisions and Modifications) Order 2015; Civil Jurisdiction and Judgments (Hague Convention on Choice of Court Agreements 2005) Regulations 2015; Succession (Scotland) Act 2016; Immigration Act 2016; Criminal Finances Act 2017; Civil Jurisdiction and Judgments (Hague Convention on Choice of Court Agreements 2005) (EU Exit) Regulations 2018; Civil Jurisdiction and Judgments (Amendment) (EU Exit) Regulations 2019; Jurisdiction and Judgments (Family) (Amendment etc.) (EU Exit) Regulations 2019; Civil Jurisdiction and Judgments (Civil and Family) (Amendment) (EU Exit) Regulations 2019; Divorce, Dissolution and Separation Act 2020; Private International Law (Implementation of Agreements) Act 2020; Civil, Criminal and Family Justice (Amendment) (EU Exit) Regulations 2020; Jurisdiction, Judgments and Applicable Law (Amendment) (EU Exit) Regulations 2020; Civil Jurisdiction and Judgments (2005 Hague Convention and 2007 Hague Convention) (Amendment) Regulations 2022; Economic Crime and Corporate Transparency Act 2023; Trusts and Succession (Scotland) Act 2024; Recognition and Enforcement of Judgments (2019 Hague Convention etc.) Regulations 2024

Status: Amended

Text of statute as originally enacted

Revised text of statute as amended

Text of the Civil Jurisdiction and Judgments Act 1982 as in force today (including any amendments) within the United Kingdom, from legislation.gov.uk.

The Civil Jurisdiction and Judgments Act 1982 (c. 27) is an act of the Parliament of the United Kingdom, which was passed to implement the Brussels Convention of 1968 into British law. As well as governing whether the courts of England and Wales, Northern Ireland and Scotland have jurisdiction to hear cases against defendants in other contracting states, the act provided a statutory basis for the division of jurisdiction between the three jurisdictions within the UK. No provision was made in 1982 for division of jurisdiction between the UK and Gibraltar; this was rectified by the Civil Jurisdiction and Judgments Act 1982 (Gibraltar) Order 1997 (SI 1997/2602) which stated that, for the purposes of the 1982 act, Gibraltar should be treated as a separate contracting state.

A further significant amendment was made to the act by the Civil Jurisdiction and Judgments Act 1991 which gave courts power under the Lugano Convention, and later by the Civil Jurisdiction and Judgments Order 2001 which gave courts jurisdiction under Council Regulation (EC) 44/2001 (commonly known as the Judgments Regulation or the Brussels Regulation). The latter applies to all 27 current member states of the European Union.

== Contracting states in 1982 ==
The contracting states to the Brussels Convention in 1982 were the then members of the European Economic Community (now the European Union). These were Belgium, Denmark, France, (West) Germany, Greece, Republic of Ireland, Italy, Luxembourg and the Netherlands.

== Provisions ==
=== Repealed enactments ===
Section 54(1) of the act repealed 18 enactments, listed in schedule 14 to the act.

Citation	Short title	Extent of repeal
41 Geo. 3. c. 90	Crown Debts Act 1801	The preamble.
41 Geo. 3. c. 90	Crown Debts Act 1801	Sections 1 to 8.
5 Geo. 4. c. 111	Crown Debts Act 1824	The whole act.
22 & 23 Vict. c. 21	Queen's Remembrancer Act 1859	Section 24.
31 & 32 Vict. c. 54	Judgments Extension Act 1868	The whole act.
31 & 32 Vict. c. 96	Ecclesiastical Buildings and Glebes (Scotland) Act 1868	In section 4, the words "of the county in which the parish concerned is situated" and the words from "provided" to the end.
45 & 46 Vict. c. 31	Inferior Courts Judgments Extension Act 1882	The whole act.
7 Edw. 7. c. 51	Sheriff Courts (Scotland) Act 1907	In section 5, the words from the first "Provided" to "that jurisdiction".
14 & 15 Geo. 5. c. 27	Conveyancing (Scotland) Act 1924	In section 23(6) the words from "of the county" to "is situated".
23 & 24 Geo. 5. c. 13	Foreign Judgments (Reciprocal Enforcement) Act 1933	In section 4(2)(a)(i), the words from "otherwise" to "that court".
23 & 24 Geo. 5. c. 13	Foreign Judgments (Reciprocal Enforcement) Act 1933	Section 4(3)(b).
23 & 24 Geo. 5. c. 13	Foreign Judgments (Reciprocal Enforcement) Act 1933	In section 9(1), the word "superior" in both places where it occurs.
23 & 24 Geo. 5. c. 13	Foreign Judgments (Reciprocal Enforcement) Act 1933	In section 11(1), the definition of "Judgments given in the superior courts of the United Kingdom".
23 & 24 Geo. 5. c. 13	Foreign Judgments (Reciprocal Enforcement) Act 1933	In section 12, in paragraph (a) the words from "(except" to "this Act)", and paragraph (d).
23 & 24 Geo. 5. c. 13	Foreign Judgments (Reciprocal Enforcement) Act 1933	In section 13(6), the words "and section two hundred and thirteen", "respectively" and "and 116".
14 Geo. 6. c. 37	Maintenance Orders Act 1950	Section 6.
14 Geo. 6. c. 37	Maintenance Orders Act 1950	Section 8.
14 Geo. 6. c. 37	Maintenance Orders Act 1950	Section 9(1)(a).
14 Geo. 6. c. 37	Maintenance Orders Act 1950	In section 16(2)(b)(v), the words from the beginning to "or".
4 & 5 Eliz. 2. c. 46	Administration of Justice Act 1956	Section 51(a).
1963 c. 22	Sheriff Courts (Civil Jurisdiction and Procedure) (Scotland) Act 1963	Section 3(2).
1965 c. 2	Administration of Justice Act 1965	In Schedule 1, the entry relating to the Crown Debts Act 1801.
1971 c. 55	Law Reform (Jurisdiction in Delict) (Scotland) Act 1971	The whole act.
1972 c. 18	Maintenance Orders (Reciprocal Enforcement) Act 1972	In section 40—(a) in paragraph (a), the words "against persons in that country or territory"; and (b) in paragraph (b), the words "against persons in the United Kingdom".
1972 c. 18	Maintenance Orders (Reciprocal Enforcement) Act 1972	In section 47(3), the words "or 'having ceased to reside'".
1972 c. 18	Maintenance Orders (Reciprocal Enforcement) Act 1972	In the Schedule, paragraph 4.
1976 c. 25	Fair Employment (Northern Ireland) Act 1976	Section 47.
1978 c. 23	Judicature (Northern Ireland) Act 1978	In Part II of Schedule 5—(a) the entry relating to the Crown Debts Act 1801; and (b) in the entry relating to the Foreign Judgments (Reciprocal Enforcement) Act 1933, the word "respectively", where last occurring, and the words "and 116".
1981 c. 54	Supreme Court Act 1981	In Schedule 5, paragraph 2 of the entry relating to the Foreign Judgments (Reciprocal Enforcement) Act 1933.

== See also ==
- Civil Jurisdiction and Judgments Act 1991
- Civil Procedure Rules 1998

== Bibliography ==
Sime, Stuart (2008). A Practical Approach to Civil Procedure. Oxford: Oxford University Press. pp. 135, 153. ISBN 978-0-19-954253-6.
