= Matrimonial Proceedings (Magistrates' Courts) Act 1960 =

Act of the Parliament of the United Kingdom

Matrimonial Proceedings (Magistrates' Courts) Act 1960 (Note: Section 19(1).)
- Act of Parliament
- Parliament of the United Kingdom
- Long title: An Act to amend and consolidate certain enactments relating to matrimonial proceedings in magistrates' courts and to make in the case of other proceedings the same amendments as to the maximum weekly rate of the maintenance payments which may be ordered by a magistrates' court as are made in the case of matrimonial proceedings.
- Citation: 8 & 9 Eliz. 2. c. 48
- Territorial extent: England and Wales (Note: Section 19(2).)

Dates
- Royal assent: 29 July 1960
- Commencement: 1 January 1961 (Note: Section 19(3). The Matrimonial Proceedings (Magistrates' Courts) Act 1960 (Commencement) Order 1960 (SI 1960/2223).)
- Repealed: 1 February 1981
Other legislation
| Amends | See § Repealed enactments |
| Repeals/revokes | See § Repealed enactments |
| Amended by | Matrimonial Proceedings and Property Act 1970; Statute Law (Repeals) Act 1974; Administration of Justice Act 1977 |
| Repealed by | Domestic Proceedings and Magistrates' Courts Act 1978 |

Status: Repealed

Text of statute as originally enacted

The Matrimonial Proceedings (Magistrates' Courts) Act 1960 (8 & 9 Eliz. 2. c. 48) was an act of the Parliament of the United Kingdom that consolidated enactments related to matrimonial proceedings in magistrates' courts in England and Wales.

== Provisions ==
=== Repealed enactments ===
Section 18(1) of the act repealed 11 enactments, listed in the schedule to the act.

| Citation | Short title | Extent of repeal |
|---|---|---|
| 58 & 59 Vict. c. 39 | Summary Jurisdiction (Married Women) Act 1895 | The whole act. |
| 2 Edw. 7. c. 28 | Licensing Act 1902 | Section 5. |
| 10 & 11 Geo. 5. c. 63 | Married Women (Maintenance) Act 1920 | The whole act. |
| 15 & 16 Geo. 5. c. 51 | Summary Jurisdiction (Separation and Maintenance) Act 1925 | The whole act. |
| 25 & 26 Geo. 5. c. 46 | Money Payments (Justices Procedure) Act 1935 | Section 9. |
| 1 Edw. 8 & 1 Geo. 6. c. 57 | Matrimonial Causes Act 1937 | Section 11. |
| 12, 13 & 14 Geo. 6. c. 99 | Married Women (Maintenance) Act 1949 | The whole act. |
| 14 Geo. 6. c. 37 | Maintenance Orders Act 1950 | Sections 1 and 5. |
| 14 & 15 Geo. 6. c. 56 | Guardianship and Maintenance of Infants Act 1951 | In section 1, subsection (3) from "but" onwards. Section 2. In section 4, in subsection (2), the words from "and any order" to "this Act" where next thereafter occurring. |
| 15 & 16 Geo. 6 & 1 Eliz. 2. c. 55 | Magistrates' Courts Act 1952 | In section 52, the proviso to subsection (2). In section 126, in subsection (1), the paragraph commencing with the words "Maintenance order". |
| 1 & 2 Eliz. 2. c. 47 | Emergency Laws (Miscellaneous Provisions) Act 1953 | In the First Schedule, paragraph 3. |

== Subsequent developments ==
The schedule to the act, together with words in section 18(1), were repealed by section 1 of, and part XI of the schedule to, the Statute Law (Repeals) Act 1974, which came into force on 27 June 1974.

The whole act was repealed by section 89(2)(b) of, and schedule 3 to, the Domestic Proceedings and Magistrates' Courts Act 1978, which came into force on 1 February 1981.
