= Law Reform (Miscellaneous Provisions) (Northern Ireland) Order 2006 =

Order in Council for Northern Ireland

Law Reform (Miscellaneous Provisions) (Northern Ireland) Order 2006 (Note: Article 1(1).)
- Statutory Instrument
- Parliament of the United Kingdom
- Citation: SI 2006/1945 (N.I. 14)
- Territorial extent: Northern Ireland

Dates
- Made: 19 July 2006
- Commencement: 20 September 2006 (Note: Article 1(3).)

Other legislation
- Amends: Children and Young Persons Act (Northern Ireland) 1968; Family Law (Miscellaneous Provisions) (Northern Ireland) Order 1984; Family Law (Northern Ireland) Order 1993; Gender Recognition Act 2004; Civil Partnership Act 2004
- Made under: Northern Ireland Act 2000
- Amended by: Justice Act (Northern Ireland) 2011; Justice (Sexual Offences and Trafficking Victims) Act (Northern Ireland) 2022
- Relates to: Children Act 2004

Status: Amended

Text of statute as originally enacted

Revised text of statute as amended

Text of the Law Reform (Miscellaneous Provisions) (Northern Ireland) Order 2006 as in force today (including any amendments) within the United Kingdom, from legislation.gov.uk.

The Law Reform (Miscellaneous Provisions) (Northern Ireland) Order 2006 (SI 2006/1945 (N.I. 14)) is an Order in Council that reformed the law of Northern Ireland on the physical punishment of children and on the prohibited degrees of relationship that restrict certain marriages and civil partnerships, and made a minor correction to the Civil Partnership Act 2004. It was made by the Queen-in-Council under the Northern Ireland Act 2000 at a time when the Northern Ireland Assembly was suspended, a draft having first been approved by resolution of each House of Parliament.

== Background ==
The order dealt with three unrelated issues: the defence of reasonable chastisement, the law relating to marriage and civil partnership, and a minor technical correction to the Civil Partnership Act 2004. Its provision on the physical punishment of children followed the European Court of Human Rights' decision in A v United Kingdom (1998), which held that the state had breached article 3 of the European Convention on Human Rights by failing to protect a boy from beatings by his stepfather, and largely mirrors section 58 of the Children Act 2004, which made corresponding provision for England and Wales.

Because the Northern Ireland Assembly was suspended between October 2002 and May 2007, legislation of this kind was made instead by Order in Council under the Northern Ireland Act 2000, subject to approval of a draft by both Houses of Parliament, rather than by the Assembly itself.
