= Constitutional Reform Act 2005 =

Act of the Parliament of the United Kingdom

Constitutional Reform Act 2005 (Note: Section 149.)
- Act of Parliament
- Parliament of the United Kingdom
- Long title: An Act to make provision for modifying the office of Lord Chancellor, and to make provision relating to the functions of that office; to establish a Supreme Court of the United Kingdom, and to abolish the appellate jurisdiction of the House of Lords; to make provision about the jurisdiction of the Judicial Committee of the Privy Council and the judicial functions of the President of the Council; to make other provision about the judiciary, their appointment and discipline; and for connected purposes.
- Citation: 2005 c. 4
- Introduced by: Chris Leslie MP, Parliamentary Under-Secretary of State for Constitutional Affairs (Commons); Lord Falconer of Thoroton, Secretary of State for Constitutional Affairs and Lord Chancellor (Lords)
- Territorial extent: United Kingdom (Note: Section 147.)

Dates
- Royal assent: 24 March 2005
- Commencement: Various (Note: Section 148.)
Other legislation
Amends	Ecclesiastical Licences Act 1533; Habeas Corpus Act 1679; Cestui que Vie Act 1707; Clerk of the Parliaments Act 1824; Chelsea and Kilmainham Hospitals Act 1826; Parliamentary Papers Act 1840; Promissory Oaths Act 1868; Public Schools Act 1868; Promissory Oaths Act 1871; Great Seal (Offices) Act 1874; Commons Act 1876; Sheriffs Act 1887; Deeds of Arrangement Act 1914; Statutory Instruments Act 1946; Agriculture Act 1947; Registered Designs Act 1949; Arbitration Act 1950; Miners' Welfare Act 1952; Administration of Justice Act 1956; Agricultural Marketing Act 1958; Public Records Act 1958; Transport Act 1962; Administration of Justice Act 1964; Administration of Justice Act 1965; Law Commissions Act 1965; Mines (Working Facilities and Support) Act 1966; Criminal Appeal Act 1968; Courts-Martial (Appeals) Act 1968; Administration of Justice Act 1969; Administration of Justice Act 1970; Courts Act 1971; Misuse of Drugs Act 1971; Land Charges Act 1972; Criminal Justice Act 1972; Juries Act 1974; Solicitors Act 1974; House of Commons Disqualification Act 1975; Northern Ireland Assembly Disqualification Act 1975; Ministers of the Crown Act 1975; Ministerial and Other Salaries Act 1975; Industry Act 1975; Restrictive Practices Court Act 1976; Administration of Justice Act 1977; Domestic Proceedings and Magistrates' Courts Act 1978; Judicature (Northern Ireland) Act 1978; Customs and Excise Management Act 1979; Tobacco Products Duty Act 1979; Magistrates' Courts Act 1980; Solicitors (Scotland) Act 1980; Criminal Appeal (Northern Ireland) Act 1980; Law Reform (Miscellaneous Provisions) (Scotland) Act 1980; Judicial Pensions Act 1981; Civil Jurisdiction and Judgments Act 1982; County Courts Act 1984; Inheritance Tax Act 1984; Reserve Forces (Safeguard of Employment) Act 1985; Law Reform (Miscellaneous Provisions) (Scotland) Act 1985; Legal Aid (Scotland) Act 1986; Family Law Reform Act 1987; Criminal Justice Act 1988; Court of Session Act 1988; Opticians Act 1989; Planning (Listed Buildings and Conservation Areas) Act 1990; Planning (Consequential Provisions) Act 1990; Courts and Legal Services Act 1990; Water Industry Act 1991; Water Resources Act 1991; Land Drainage Act 1991; Water Consolidation (Consequential Provisions) Act 1991; Social Security Administration (Northern Ireland) Act 1992; Judicial Pensions and Retirement Act 1993; Value Added Tax Act 1994; Criminal Procedure (Scotland) Act 1995; Employment Tribunals Act 1996; Arbitration Act 1996; Defamation Act 1996; Education Act 1996; Human Rights Act 1998; Access to Justice Act 1999; Immigration and Asylum Act 1999; Terrorism Act 2000; International Criminal Court Act 2001; Anti-terrorism, Crime and Security Act 2001; Land Registration Act 2002; Justice (Northern Ireland) Act 2002; Crime (International Co-operation) Act 2003; Statute Law (Repeals) Act 2004; Public Audit (Wales) Act 2004; Armed Forces (Pensions and Compensation) Act 2004; Prevention of Terrorism Act 2005
Amended by	List: Commons Act 2006; Government of Wales Act 2006; National Health Service (Consequential Provisions) Act 2006; Companies Act 2006; Safeguarding Vulnerable Groups Act 2006; Police and Justice Act 2006; Charities Act 2006; Armed Forces Act 2006; Judicial Appointments and Discipline (Modification of Offices) Order 2006; Judicial Appointments and Discipline (Modification of Offices) (No.2) Order 2006; Regulatory Reform (Agricultural Tenancies) (England and Wales) Order 2006; Income Tax Act 2007; Tribunals, Courts and Enforcement Act 2007; Local Government and Public Involvement in Health Act 2007; Legal Services Act 2007; Transfer of Functions (Asylum Support Adjudicators) Order 2007; Government of Wales Act 2006 (Consequential Modifications and Transitional Provisions) Order 2007; Secretary of State for Justice Order 2007; Health and Social Care Act 2008; Local Transport Act 2008; Transfer of Tribunal Functions Order 2008; Northern Ireland Act 2009; Coroners and Justice Act 2009; Transfer of Tribunal Functions and Revenue and Customs Appeals Order 2009; Transfer of Tribunal Functions (Lands Tribunal and Miscellaneous Amendments) Order 2009; Transfer of Functions of the Charity Tribunal Order 2009; Transfer of Functions (Estate Agents Appeals and Additional Scheduled Tribunal) Order 2009; Companies Act 2006 (Consequential Amendments, Transitional Provisions and Savings) Order 2009; Government of Wales Act 2006 (Consequential Modifications, Transitional Provisions and Saving) Order 2009; Corporation Tax Act 2010; Transfer of Functions of the Asylum and Immigration Tribunal Order 2010; Transfer of Tribunal Functions Order 2010; Children, Schools and Families Act 2010; Conservation of Habitats and Species Regulations 2010; Northern Ireland Act 1998 (Devolution of Policing and Justice Functions) Order 2010; Budget Responsibility and National Audit Act 2011; Pensions Act 2011; Government of Wales Act 2006 (Commencement of Assembly Act Provisions, Transitional and Saving Provisions and Modifications) Order 2011; Legal Aid, Sentencing and Punishment of Offenders Act 2012; Financial Services Act 2012; Public Bodies (Abolition of Courts Boards) Order 2012; Public Bodies (Abolition of Crown Court Rule Committee and Magistrates' Courts Rule Committee) Order 2012; Tribunals, Courts and Enforcement Act 2007 (Consequential Amendments) Order 2012; Crime and Courts Act 2013; Public Service Pensions Act 2013; Marriage (Same Sex Couples) Act 2013; Competition Act 1998 (Consequential Provisions) Order 2013; Police and Fire Reform (Scotland) Act 2012 (Consequential Provisions and Modifications) Order 2013; Public Bodies (Abolition of the Aircraft and Shipbuilding Industries Arbitration Tribunal) Order 2013; Transfer of Tribunal Functions Order 2013; Legal Aid and Coroners' Courts Act (Northern Ireland) 2014; Co-operative and Community Benefit Societies Act 2014; Courts Reform (Scotland) Act 2014; Intellectual Property Act 2014; Judicial Appointments and Discipline (Addition of Office) Order 2014; Mines Regulations 2014; Criminal Justice and Courts Act 2015; Infrastructure Act 2015; Justice Act (Northern Ireland) 2015; Deregulation Act 2015; Courts Reform (Scotland) Act 2014 (Consequential Provisions and Modifications) Order 2015; Investigatory Powers Act 2016; Wales Act 2017; Conservation of Habitats and Species Regulations 2017; Judicial Appointments and Discipline (Amendment and Addition of Offices) Order 2017; Statute Law (Repeals) Measure 2018; Additional Learning Needs and Education Tribunal (Wales) Act 2018; Ecclesiastical Jurisdiction and Care of Churches Measure 2018; Data Protection Act 2018; Courts and Tribunals (Judiciary and Functions of Staff) Act 2018; Alteration of Judicial Titles (Registrar in Bankruptcy of the High Court) Order 2018; Additional Learning Needs and Education Tribunal (Wales) Act 2018 (Supplementary Provisions) Regulations 2019; Sentencing (Pre-consolidation Amendments) Act 2020; Sentencing Act 2020; European Union Withdrawal (Consequential Modifications) (EU Exit) Regulations 2020; Charities Act 2022; Public Service Pensions and Judicial Offices Act 2022; Criminal Justice Act 2003 (Commencement No. 33) and Sentencing Act 2020 (Commencement No. 2) Regulations 2022; Planning (Consequential Provisions) (Wales) Act 2026; Crime and Policing Act 2026

Status: Amended

Text of statute as originally enacted

Revised text of statute as amended

The Constitutional Reform Act 2005 (c. 4) is an act of the Parliament of the United Kingdom, relevant to UK constitutional law. It provides for a Supreme Court of the United Kingdom to take over the previous appellate jurisdiction of the Law Lords as well as some powers of the Judicial Committee of the Privy Council, and removed the functions of Speaker of the House of Lords and Head of the Judiciary of England and Wales from the office of Lord Chancellor.

== Background ==
The office of Lord Chancellor was reformed to remove the ability of the holder to act as both a government minister and a judge, an arrangement that ran contrary to the idea of separation of powers. The reform was motivated by concerns that the historical mixture of legislative, judicial, and executive power might not conform with the requirements of Article 6 (paragraph 1) of the European Convention on Human Rights, because a judicial officer who has legislative or executive power is likely not to be considered sufficiently impartial to provide a fair trial. This act ensures that the powers of the Lord Chancellor and the Secretary of State for Justice have limitations on their abilities over the president of the court.

== Legislative history ==
The bill was originally introduced in the House of Lords on 24 February 2004 and proposed the following changes:

- Abolition of the office of "Lord High Chancellor of Great Britain", generally known as the Lord Chancellor.
- Setting up of a "Supreme Court of the United Kingdom" and moving the Law Lords out of the House of Lords to this new court.
- Other measures relating to the judiciary, including changes to the position of the Lord Chief Justice and changes to the Judicial Committee of the Privy Council.

The bill caused much controversy and the Lords made amendments to it. The most significant of these was the decision not to abolish the position of Lord Chancellor, as, unlike other Secretaries of State in the UK Government, a number of the Lord Chancellor's functions are explicitly defined in law, and transferring these functions to other individuals would have required further legislation. However, although the post was retained, its role in relation to the judiciary is greatly reduced and the office holder is no longer automatically Speaker of the House of Lords because of the Government's announced intention to appoint Lord Chancellors from the House of Commons. Other measures remained generally the same as stated above.

The newly created Cabinet position of Secretary of State for Constitutional Affairs (originally created to wholly replace the Lord Chancellor's executive function) continued, although the holder of that Cabinet post - renamed Secretary of State for Justice in 2007 - currently also holds the office of Lord Chancellor. The Lord Chancellor remains the custodian of the Great Seal (the bill as originally written put this into commission).

The bill was approved by both Houses on 21 March 2005, and received royal assent on 24 March.

== Changes resulting from the act ==
The act contains provisions which reform two institutions and one former office of the United Kingdom. The document is divided into three parts: the first concerns the reform of the office of Lord Chancellor, the second creates and sets the framework for a Supreme Court, and the third regulates the appointment of judges.

=== Role of the Lord Chancellor ===
Under the new legislation, the role of the Lord Chancellor was redefined. Rather than being the head of the Judiciary in England and Wales, the role of the Lord Chancellor was changed to managing the judiciary system including the Supreme Court, county courts, magistrates' courts, and coroners' courts. In carrying out this duty, the Lord Chancellor is required to address both houses of Parliament and deliver a report as to how he or she has managed the Judiciary system.

The Lord Chief Justice replaces the Lord Chancellor as head of the English and Welsh judiciary and is also responsible for representing the views of the judiciary to the Lord Chancellor and Parliament as a whole. The Lord Speaker replaces the Lord Chancellor as the speaker of the House of Lords.

The law also set out an oath of office for the Lord Chancellor to take. the Oath being: "I, (name), do swear that in the office of Lord High Chancellor of Great Britain I will respect the rule of law, defend the independence of the judiciary and discharge my duty to ensure the provision of resources for the efficient and effective support of the courts for which I am responsible. So help me God."

=== Supreme Court ===
The establishment of a Supreme Court is the main subject of the act and it had consequences for the House of Lords and the office of Lord Chancellor. The sections contained in Part 3 prescribe that the Supreme Court be composed of 12 judges (s. 23) and that the first judges be the then-current twelve Lords of Appeal in Ordinary (s. 24). The following sections (ss. 26–31) set out the rules for the appointment of future members of the Court. Section 11 of the Supreme Court Act 1981, amended by The Judicial Pensions and Retirement Act 1993, requires Justices of the Supreme Court to retire at age 70. Justices are appointed by the Monarch on the recommendation of the Prime Minister. On a death, or deselection approved by both houses, its selection commission consisting of the President and Deputy President of the Supreme Court (schedule 8) proposes one name to the Lord Chancellor who may reject a name only once per vacancy (since amended to Secretary of State for Justice), having a single veto. Sections 32 to 37 are entitled Terms of Appointment and deal with issues such as tenure, salaries and allowances, resignation and retirement, and pensions. Section 40 additionally sets out that the new Court will assume the jurisdiction of the House of Lords and the jurisdiction in matters of devolution of the Privy Council.

The following sections deal with practical matters such as procedures, staff, and resources of the new Court and the fees of the judges. The Chief Executive of the Supreme Court must prepare an annual report on the work and it must be presented to both Houses of Parliament (s. 51).

Although the Appellate Committee of the House of Lords is abolished, the 2005–06 serving Law Lords kept their judicial office in the new Supreme Court. Newly appointed members of the Court take no peerage, instead bearing the formal title Justice of the Supreme Court. Under the act such judges also have a courtesy title of Lord or Lady, for the expressed purpose of ensuring there is no perceived hierarchy among the justices.

The new Supreme Court sits in a separate building from the Houses of Parliament where the mentioned predecessor judicial committee (of the House of Lords) formerly acted as the UK's final court of appeal. After a lengthy survey of suitable sites, including Somerset House, Parliament and the former Lord Chancellor's Department agreed to the Court's installation in Middlesex Guildhall in Parliament Square, formerly a Crown Court building. Architect Lord Foster was chosen to design the necessary alterations. The building reopened as the Supreme Court on 1 October 2009.

=== Appointment of judges ===
The third part of the act is about the appointment of judges. In 1991 the Law Society had criticized the old system (the Monarch appointing judges on the advice of the Lord Chancellor), emphasizing its defects and recommending the establishment of an independent body responsible for appointing judges. The Constitutional Reform Act realized the hopes of the Law Society. Section 61 prescribed the creation of the Judicial Appointments Commission, responsible for the appointment of judges for English and Welsh courts. The following sections regulate the structure and the procedures of the Commission.

There are several criteria set out by the law in order for a person to become eligible to sit on the Supreme Court. These are:

- held high judicial office for a period of at least 2 years,
- been a qualifying practitioner for a period of at least 15 years,
- satisfied the judicial-appointment eligibility condition on a 15-year basis, or
- been a qualifying practitioner for a period of at least 15 years.

== Further developments ==
Lord Falconer later said that he regretted trying to abolish the role of Lord Chancellor.

== See also ==
- Constitutional reform in the United Kingdom
- Halsbury's Statutes
- Reform of the House of Lords
- United Kingdom constitutional law
