= Guardianship of Minors Act 1971 =

Act of the Parliament of the United Kingdom

Guardianship of Minors Act 1971 (Note: Section 20(1).)
- Act of Parliament
- Parliament of the United Kingdom
- Long title: An Act to consolidate certain enactments relating to the guardianship and custody of minors.
- Citation: 1971 c. 3
- Territorial extent: England and Wales (Note: Section 20(4).)

Dates
- Royal assent: 17 February 1971
- Commencement: 17 March 1971 (Note: Section 20(5).)
- Repealed: 14 October 1991 (Note: The Children Act 1989 (Commencement and Transitional Provisions) Order 1991 (SI 1991/828).)

Other legislation
- Amends: See § Repealed enactments
- Repeals/revokes: See § Repealed enactments
- Amended by: Legal Aid Act 1974; Adoption Act 1976; Statute Law (Repeals) Act 1977; Domestic Proceedings and Magistrates' Courts Act 1978; Senior Courts Act 1981; Family Law Reform Act 1987
- Repealed by: Children Act 1989

Status: Repealed

Text of statute as originally enacted

Revised text of statute as amended

The Guardianship of Minors Act 1971 (c. 3) was an act of the Parliament of the United Kingdom that consolidated enactments relating to the guardianship and custody of minors in England and Wales.

== Provisions ==
=== Repealed enactments ===
Section 18(2) of the act repealed 12 enactments, listed in schedule 2 to the act.

Enactments repealed by section 18(2)
Citation	Short title	Extent of repeal
49 & 50 Vict. c. 27	Guardianship of Infants Act 1886	The whole act.
15 & 16 Geo. 5. c. 45	Guardianship of Infants Act 1925	The whole act.
18 & 19 Geo. 5. c. 26	Administration of Justice Act 1928	Section 16.
22 & 23 Geo. 5. c. 46	Children and Young Persons Act 1932	Section 79.
11 & 12 Geo. 6. c. 43	Children Act 1948	Sections 50 and 53.
14 Geo. 6. c. 37	Maintenance Orders Act 1950	In section 2, subsections (1) and (2), and in subsection (3) the words "section five of the Guardianship of Infants Act, 1886. or ".
14 & 15 Geo. 6. c. 56	Guardianship and Maintenance of Infants Act 1951	The whole act.
7 & 8 Eliz. 2. c. 73	Legitimacy Act 1959	Section 3.
1963 c. 37	Children and Young Persons Act 1963	Section 50.
1967 c. 80	Criminal Justice Act 1967	In Schedule 3 the entry relating to the Guardianship of Infants Act 1925.
1969 c. 46	Family Law Reform Act 1969	Section 4.
1969 c. 46	Family Law Reform Act 1969	In section 28(4)(c) the words "4(5) and ".
1970 c. 31	Administration of Justice Act 1970	Section 49.
1970 c. 31	Administration of Justice Act 1970	Schedule 11 so far as it relates to sections 6, 9 and 10 of the Guardianship of Infants Act 1886.

== Subsequent developments ==
The whole act was repealed by section 108(7) of, and schedule 15 to, the Children Act 1989, which came into force on 14 October 1991.
