= Sexual Offences Act 1985 =

Act of the Parliament of the United Kingdom

Sexual Offences Act 1985 (Note: Section 5(1).)
- Act of Parliament
- Parliament of the United Kingdom
- Long title: An Act to make, as respects England and Wales, provision for penalising in certain circumstances the soliciting of women for sexual purposes by men, and to increase the penalties under the Sexual Offences Act 1956 for certain offences against women.
- Citation: 1985 c. 44
- Territorial extent: England and Wales (Note: Section 5(7).)

Dates
- Royal assent: 16 July 1985
- Commencement: 16 September 1985 (Note: Section 5(4).)
- Repealed: 1 April 2010 (Note: The Policing and Crime Act 2009 (Commencement No. 4) Order 2010 (SI 2010/507))
Other legislation
| Amends | Sexual Offences Act 1956; Indecency with Children Act 1960; Police and Criminal Evidence Act 1984 |
| Amended by | Road Traffic (Consequential Provisions) Act 1988; Statute Law (Repeals) Act 1993; Sexual Offences Act 2003 |
| Repealed by | Policing and Crime Act 2009 |

Status: Repealed

Text of statute as originally enacted

Revised text of statute as amended

The Sexual Offences Act 1985 (c. 44) was an act of the Parliament of the United Kingdom that created two offences concerning prostitution, and increased the maximum sentence for attempted rape from seven years to life imprisonment. The act was applicable in England and Wales only.

The new offences were kerb crawling and persistently soliciting women for the purposes of prostitution. In 1991 the Director of Public Prosecutions and head of the Crown Prosecution Service, Sir Allan Green KCB QC, was arrested for an offence under this Act and had to resign.

== Provisions ==
Section 1 created the offence of kerb-crawling, meaning, as a man, soliciting a woman (or women) for prostitution in a public place from a vehicle or having just got out of one, either persistently or in a manner causing annoyance or nuisance. It was a summary offence punishable by a fine not exceeding level 3 on the standard scale, which was £200 (equivalent to £619 in 2025) at the time the act received royal assent, increasing to £400 (£920) in 1991 and £1000 (£2207) in 1992.

Section 2 created the summary offence of, as a man, persistently soliciting a woman (or women) for prostitution in public, with the same penalty as for kerb-crawling.

Section 3 increased the penalty for attempted rape (contrary to the Sexual Offences Act 1956) to life imprisonment, and that for indecent assault on a woman to 10 years, in the latter case abolishing the distinction in sentencing for girls under 13.

Section 4 defined terms used in the Act and disapplied the rule in the Interpretation Act 1978 in which "words importing the masculine gender [include] the feminine, and vice versa".

Section 5 provided for its short title, commencement and extent, as well as some consequential amendments.

== Subsequent developments ==
Sections 3, 4(2) and (3), and 5(2) of the act were repealed by section 140 of, and schedule 7 to, the Sexual Offences Act 2003, which came into force on 1 May 2004.

The whole act was repealed by section 112(2) of, and part 2 of schedule 8 to, the Policing and Crime Act 2009, which came into force on 1 April 2010.

== See also ==
- Prostitution in the United Kingdom
- Sexual Offences Act
- Attempted Rape Act 1948
