= Deeds of Arrangement Act 1914 =

Act of the Parliament of the United Kingdom

Deeds of Arrangement Act 1914 (Note: Section 32(1).)
- Act of Parliament
- Parliament of the United Kingdom
- Long title: An Act to consolidate the law relating to deeds of arrangement.
- Citation: 4 & 5 Geo. 5. c. 47
- Territorial extent: England and Wales (Note: Section 32(2).)

Dates
- Royal assent: 10 August 1914
- Commencement: 1 January 1915 (Note: Section 32(3).)
- Repealed: 1 October 2015
Other legislation
Amends	See § Repealed enactments
Repeals/revokes	See § Repealed enactments
Amended by	Trustee Act 1925; Administration of Estates Act 1925; Statute Law Revision Act 1927; Finance Act 1949; Administration of Justice Act 1965; Statute Law (Repeals) Act 1977; Criminal Law Act 1977; Magistrates' Courts Act 1980; Criminal Justice Act 1982; Insolvency Act 1985; Insolvency Act 1986; Constitutional Reform Act 2005; Tribunals, Courts and Enforcement Act 2007; Crime and Courts Act 2013
Repealed by	Deregulation Act 2015

Status: Repealed

Text of statute as originally enacted

Revised text of statute as amended

The Deeds of Arrangement Act 1914 (4 & 5 Geo. 5. c. 47) was an act of the Parliament of the United Kingdom that consolidated enactments related to deeds of arrangement in England and Wales.

== Provisions ==
=== Repealed enactments ===
Section 31(1) of the act repealed 3 enactments, listed in the schedule to the act.

Citation	Short title	Extent of repeal
50 & 51 Vict. c. 57	Deeds of Arrangement Act 1887	The whole act, except so far as it relates to Ireland.
53 & 54 Vict. c. 71	Bankruptcy Act 1890	Section twenty-five.
3 & 4 Geo. 5. c. 34	Bankruptcy and Deeds of Arrangement Act 1913	Sections twenty-seven to forty-one; in section forty-two from "and Part II. of this Act" to "extend to Ireland"; and Schedule II. so far as unrepealed.

== Subsequent developments ==
Section 31 of the act was repealed by section 1(1) of, and part XIX of schedule 1 to, the Statute Law (Repeals) Act 1977, which came into force on 16 June 1977.

The whole act was repealed by section 19 of, and paragraph 1(1) of part 1 of schedule 6 to the Deregulation Act 2015 (2015 c. 20), which came into force on 1 October 2015.
