= Civil Jurisdiction and Judgments Act 1991 =

Act of the Parliament of the United Kingdom

Civil Jurisdiction and Judgments Act 1991 (Note: Section 5(1).)
- Act of Parliament
- Parliament of the United Kingdom
- Long title: An Act to give effect to the Convention on jurisdiction and the enforcement of judgments in civil and commercial matters, including the Protocols annexed thereto, opened for signature at Lugano on 16th September 1988; and for purposes connected therewith.
- Citation: 1991 c. 12
- Territorial extent: United Kingdom (Note: Section 5(4).)

Dates
- Royal assent: 9 May 1991
- Commencement: 1 May 1992 (Note: Section 5(3). The Civil Jurisdiction and Judgments Act 1991 (Commencement) Order 1992 (SI 1992/745).)
Other legislation
Amends	Civil Jurisdiction and Judgments Act 1982

Status: Current legislation

Text of statute as originally enacted

Revised text of statute as amended

Text of the Civil Jurisdiction and Judgments Act 1991 as in force today (including any amendments) within the United Kingdom, from legislation.gov.uk.

The Civil Jurisdiction and Judgments Act 1991 (c. 12) is an act of the Parliament of the United Kingdom which implemented the Lugano Convention of 1988 in British law.

== Provisions ==
Section 1 of the act inserted sections 3A and 3B into the Civil Jurisdiction and Judgments Act 1982. Section 3A gave the Lugano Convention the force of law in the United Kingdom, with judicial notice to be taken of it, and set out its English text in a new schedule 3C, which schedule 1 to the act supplied. Section 3B required United Kingdom courts, in accordance with Protocol No. 2 to the Convention, to take account of principles laid down in relevant decisions of the courts of other Lugano contracting states, and allowed the report on the Convention by Mr P. Jenard and Mr G. Möller to be considered in ascertaining the meaning or effect of its provisions. Section 1 also inserted a new subsection (1A) into section 9 of the 1982 act, under which a question whether the Lugano Convention or one of the Brussels Conventions applied in a particular case was determined in accordance with Article 54B of the Lugano Convention.

Section 2 of the act amended section 1 of the 1982 act, which defined references to the Conventions and Contracting States. It replaced "the Conventions" with "the Brussels Conventions", defined "the Lugano Convention" as the Convention opened for signature at Lugano on 16 September 1988 and signed by the United Kingdom on 18 September 1989, and defined a "Lugano Contracting State" as one of the original parties to the Convention in relation to which it had taken effect. Section 3 of the act gave effect to the further consequential and implementing amendments to the 1982 act in schedule 2, and section 4 provided that the amendments bound the Crown in accordance with section 51 of the 1982 act.

Section 5 of the act provided the short title, brought the act into force on a day appointed by the Lord Chancellor and the Lord Advocate by order, and extended it to Northern Ireland.

== Contracting states in 1991 ==
In addition to the contracting states to the Brussels Convention over which the Civil Jurisdiction and Judgments Act 1982 gave the UK courts jurisdiction, the contracting states to the Lugano Convention were the members of the European Free Trade Association who were not members of the European Economic Community (now European Union); namely Austria, Finland, Iceland, Norway, Sweden and Switzerland. Poland became a contracting state when it signed the Lugano Convention in 2000.

== See also ==
- Civil Jurisdiction and Judgments Act 1982
