= Domestic Proceedings and Magistrates' Courts Act 1978 =

Act of the Parliament of the United Kingdom

Domestic Proceedings and Magistrates' Courts Act 1978 (Note: Section 90(1).)
- Act of Parliament
- Parliament of the United Kingdom
- Long title: An Act to make fresh provision for matrimonial proceedings in magistrates' courts; to amend enactments relating to other proceedings so as to eliminate certain differences between the law relating to those proceedings and the law relating to matrimonial proceedings in magistrates' courts; to extend section 15 of the Justices of the Peace Act 1949; to amend Part II of the Magistrates' Courts Act 1952; to amend section 2 of the Administration of Justice Act 1964; to amend the Maintenance Orders (Reciprocal Enforcement) Act 1972; to amend certain enactments relating to adoption; and for purposes connected with those matters.
- Citation: 1978 c. 22
- Territorial extent: England and Wales (Note: Section 90(2)–(3).)

Dates
- Royal assent: 30 June 1978
- Commencement: 18 July 1978 (various) (Note: Section 89(3). The Domestic Proceedings and Magistrates' Courts Act 1978 (Commencement No. 1) Order 1978 (SI 1978/997).); 20 November 1978 (various) (Note: Section 89(3). The Domestic Proceedings and Magistrates' Courts Act 1978 (Commencement No. 2) Order 1978 (SI 1978/1489).); 17 September 1979 (various) (Note: Section 89(3). The Domestic Proceedings and Magistrates' Courts Act 1978 (Commencement No. 3) Order 1979 (SI 1979/731).); 1 November 1979 (various); 1 February 1981 (rest of act) (Note: Section 89(3). The Domestic Proceedings and Magistrates' Courts Act 1978 (Commencement No. 4) Order 1980 (SI 1980/1478).)
Other legislation
Amends	See § Repealed enactments
Repeals/revokes	See § Repealed enactments
Amended by	Adoption (Scotland) Act 1978; Justices of the Peace Act 1979; Child Care Act 1980; Magistrates' Courts Act 1980; Senior Courts Act 1981; Criminal Justice Act 1982; Matrimonial and Family Proceedings Act 1984; Family Law (Scotland) Act 1985; Family Law Reform Act 1987; Legal Aid Act 1988; Children Act 1989; Courts and Legal Services Act 1990; Maintenance Enforcement Act 1991; Maintenance Orders (Reciprocal Enforcement) Act 1992; Transfer of Functions (Magistrates' Courts and Family Law) Order 1992; Maintenance Orders (Backdating) Order 1993; Family Law Act 1996; Education Act 1996; Child Support, Pensions and Social Security Act 2000; Criminal Justice and Court Services Act 2000; Courts Act 2003; Children Act 2004; Civil Partnership Act 2004; Constitutional Reform Act 2005; Access to Justice Act 1999 (Destination of Appeals) (Family Proceedings) Order 2009; Crime and Courts Act 2013; Crime and Courts Act 2013 (Family Court: Consequential Provision) Order 2014

Status: Amended

Text of statute as originally enacted

Revised text of statute as amended

Text of the Domestic Proceedings and Magistrates' Courts Act 1978 as in force today (including any amendments) within the United Kingdom, from legislation.gov.uk.

The Domestic Proceedings and Magistrates' Courts Act 1978 (c. 22) is an act of the Parliament of the United Kingdom that made fresh provision for matrimonial proceedings in magistrates' courts in England and Wales.

== Provisions ==
=== Repealed enactments ===
Section 89(2)(b) of the act repealed 25 enactments, listed in schedule 3 to the act.

Citation	Short title	Extent of repeal
11 & 12 Geo. 6. c. 29	National Assistance Act 1948	In section 43, subsection (7).
14 Geo. 6. c. 37	Maintenance Orders Act 1950	In section 2, subsection (3).
15 & 16 Geo. 6 & 1 Eliz. 2. c. 55	Magistrates' Courts Act 1952	In section 57, subsection (4).
15 & 16 Geo. 6 & 1 Eliz. 2. c. 55	Magistrates' Courts Act 1952	Section 59.
15 & 16 Geo. 6 & 1 Eliz. 2. c. 55	Magistrates' Courts Act 1952	In section 60, in subsection (1) the word "periodical" and the words "or in any proceedings in any matter of bastardy" and in subsection (2)(a) the words from "which shall be read aloud" to "at the hearing".
15 & 16 Geo. 6 & 1 Eliz. 2. c. 55	Magistrates' Courts Act 1952	In section 61, the words "or in proceedings in any matter of bastardy."
15 & 16 Geo. 6 & 1 Eliz. 2. c. 55	Magistrates' Courts Act 1952	Section 62.
15 & 16 Geo. 6 & 1 Eliz. 2. c. 55	Magistrates' Courts Act 1952	In section 121, subsection (2).
5 & 6 Eliz. 2. c. 55	Affiliation Proceedings Act 1957	In section 7, subsections (1) to (3).
8 & 9 Eliz. 2. c. 48	Matrimonial Proceedings (Magistrates' Courts) Act 1960	The whole act.
9 & 10 Eliz. 2. c. 39	Criminal Justice Act 1961	In Schedule 4, the entry relating to section 54 of the Magistrates' Courts Act 1952.
1964 c. 42	Administration of Justice Act 1964	In section 2, subsection (3A).
1964 c. 42	Administration of Justice Act 1964	In Schedule 3, paragraph 27.
1965 c. 72	Matrimonial Causes Act 1965	Section 42.
1967 c. 80	Criminal Justice Act 1967	In Schedule 3, the entry relating to the Matrimonial Proceedings (Magistrates' Courts) Act 1960.
1968 c. 36	Maintenance Orders Act 1968	In the Schedule, the entry relating to the Matrimonial Proceedings (Magistrates' Courts) Act 1960.
1969 c. 46	Family Law Reform Act 1969	In section 5, subsection (2).
1969 c. 22 (N.I.)	Adoption (Hague Convention) Act (Northern Ireland) 1969	In section 7(2) the words "in respect of a foreign convention adoption".
1970 c. 42	Local Authority Social Services Act 1970	In Schedule 1, the entry relating to the Matrimonial Proceedings (Magistrates' Courts) Act 1960.
1970 c. 45	Matrimonial Proceedings and Property Act 1970	In section 30, subsection (1).
1970 c. 45	Matrimonial Proceedings and Property Act 1970	Sections 31 to 33.
1971 c. 3	Guardianship of Minors Act 1971	In section 9, subsection (3).
1971 c. 3	Guardianship of Minors Act 1971	In section 14, subsection (4).
1971 c. 38	Misuse of Drugs Act 1971	Section 34.
1972 c. 18	Maintenance Orders (Reciprocal Enforcement) Act 1972	In section 17, subsections (1) to (3).
1972 c. 18	Maintenance Orders (Reciprocal Enforcement) Act 1972	In section 27, subsection (3).
1972 c. 18	Maintenance Orders (Reciprocal Enforcement) Act 1972	In the Schedule, paragraph 1.
1972 c. 49	Affiliation Proceedings (Amendment) Act 1972	In section 3, subsections (1) and (2).
1972 c. 70	Local Government Act 1972	In Schedule 23, paragraph 10.
1973 c. 18	Matrimonial Causes Act 1973	In section 27, subsection (8).
1973 c. 29	Guardianship Act 1973	In section 2, in subsection (5) the words from "but an interim order" to the end of the subsection.
1973 c. 29	Guardianship Act 1973	In section 3, in subsection (2) the words from "and where a supervision order" to the end of the subsection.
1973 c. 29	Guardianship Act 1973	Section 8.
1973 c. 29	Guardianship Act 1973	In Schedule 2, paragraph 1(2).
1974 c. 4	Legal Aid Act 1974	In Schedule 1, paragraph 3(a).
1975 c. 72	Children Act 1975	In section 17(1) the words "under the age of 16".
1975 c. 72	Children Act 1975	In section 21, subsection (3).
1975 c. 72	Children Act 1975	Section 91.
1975 c. 72	Children Act 1975	In Schedule 3, paragraphs 12 and 26.
1976 c. 36	Adoption Act 1976	In section 26(1) the words "under the age of 16 years".
1976 c. 36	Adoption Act 1976	In section 64, paragraph (c).
1976 c. 36	Adoption Act 1976	In Schedule 1, in paragraph 6, the words "other than a Convention adoption order".
1976 c. 36	Adoption Act 1976	In Schedule 3, paragraph 4.
1976 c. 71	Supplementary Benefits Act 1976	In section 18(7) the words from "and any proceedings for such an order" to the end of the subsection.
1976 c. 71	Supplementary Benefits Act 1976	In Schedule 7, the entry relating to section 43(7) of the National Assistance Act 1948.
