= Policing and Crime Act 2009 =

Act of the Parliament of the United Kingdom

Policing and Crime Act 2009 (Note: Section 117.)
- Act of Parliament
- Parliament of the United Kingdom
- Long title: An Act to make provision about the police; to make provision about prostitution, sex offenders, sex establishments and certain other premises; to make provision for reducing and dealing with the abuse of alcohol; to make provision about the proceeds of crime; to make provision about extradition; to amend the Aviation Security Act 1982; to make provision about criminal records and to amend the Safeguarding Vulnerable Groups Act 2006 and the Safeguarding Vulnerable Groups (Northern Ireland) Order 2007; to confer, extend or facilitate search, forfeiture and other powers relating to the United Kingdom’s borders or elsewhere; to make further provision for combatting crime and disorder; to repeal redundant provisions; and for connected purposes.
- Citation: 2009 c. 26
- Introduced by: Jacqui Smith, MP Home Secretary (Commons); Lord West of Spithead (Lords)
- Territorial extent: England and Wales; Scotland (in part); Northern Ireland (in part); (Note: Section 115.)

Dates
- Royal assent: 12 November 2009
- Commencement: 12 November 2009 (in part); 30 November 2009 (in part); 25 January 2010 (in part); 29 January 2010 (in part); 2 March 2010 (in part); 12 March 2010 (in part); 15 March 2010 (in part); 1 April 2010 (in part) (Note: Section 116.)
Other legislation
Amends	Street Offences Act 1959; Misuse of Drugs Act 1971; Police Pensions Act 1976; Customs and Excise Management Act 1979; Magistrates' Courts Act 1980; Limitation Act 1980; Civil Jurisdiction and Judgments Act 1982; Aviation Security Act 1982; Child Abduction Act 1984; Criminal Justice Act 1988; Road Traffic (Consequential Provisions) Act 1988; Football Spectators Act 1989; Police Act 1996; Confiscation of Alcohol (Young Persons) Act 1997; Postal Services Act 2000; Drugs Act 2005; Safeguarding Vulnerable Groups Act 2006
Repeals/revokes	Sexual Offences Act 1985
Amended by	Identity Documents Act 2010; Crime and Courts Act 2013; Criminal Justice and Courts Act 2015; Sentencing Act 2020
Relates to	Policing and Crime Act 2009 (Commencement No. 1 and Transitional and Saving Provisions) Order 2009 (SI 2009/3096); Policing and Crime Act 2009 (Commencement No. 2) Order 2010 (SI 2010/52); Policing and Crime Act 2009 (Commencement No. 3) Order 2010 (SI 2010/125); Policing and Crime Act 2009 (Commencement No. 4) Order 2010 (SI 2010/507)

Status: Amended

History of passage through Parliament

Text of statute as originally enacted

Revised text of statute as amended

The Policing and Crime Act 2009 (c. 26) is an act of the Parliament of the United Kingdom. The act makes provision about police reform, prostitution, sex offenders, sex establishments and certain other premises. It amends the law on aviation security, misuse, proceeds of crime, extradition and gang related violence.

The legislation came about due to a number of recommendations in government reports seeking an increase in public accountability. This led to a green paper about policing in which ways in which policing could be improved were discussed, which in turn led to the creation of the Policing Pledge. This then became a government bill and was introduced to the House of Commons on 18 December 2008, passing to the House of Lords on 20 May 2009, gaining royal assent and becoming law on 12 November 2009.

The act has received a mixed reception, with improved police accountability being praised and the changes to sexual entertainment licenses and prostitution being criticised by senior members of the police as well as other interested parties.

There were initially proposals that the act would allow the public to elect crime and policing representatives to run their local police service, but these plans were removed from the bill before it was laid before the house. Nevertheless, the act still requires police authorities to have regard for the views of people in the police area. The election of crime and policing representatives was subsequently introduced in the Police Reform and Social Responsibility Act 2011, which established Police and Crime Commissioners.

== Background ==
The act emanated from a number of recommendations in government reports on police reform and jurisdiction, and on engaging local communities in fighting crime and holding their local police service to account. When it was proposed in the Queen's Speech in 2008, the Association of Chief Police Officers (ACPO) President Ken Jones said "We welcome the Government’s continued commitment to assist the police service in tackling crime and anti-social behaviour and to strengthen our ability to protect our ports and borders."

The government initially planned to allow the local community to elect crime and policing representatives to run their police service. The Local Government Association (LGA), ACPO and the Association of Police Authorities (APA) criticised this plan, warning it would lead to heavier bureaucratic burdens on councils, increased political control on policing and would create a barrier to women and people from minority ethnic backgrounds getting involved.

The APA also stated there was a "very real danger of extremists and single issue pressure groups targeting these elections for their own ends". This plan was later dropped amid fears that the police could become politicised.

It was also announced there would be a ban on cheap alcohol promotions. Jacqui Smith told BBC News that she did not want to stop "the vast majority of people who enjoy alcohol and drink responsibly from doing so" but that "[w]e all face a cost from alcohol-related disorder and I have a duty to crack down on irresponsible promotions that can fuel excessive drinking and lead people into crime and disorder."

=== Green paper ===
The policing green paper was published on 17 July 2008 and titled 'From the neighbourhood to the national: policing our communities together'. In this green paper it discussed a number of areas where policing in the UK could be improved, based on the review that Sir Ronnie Flanagan had undertaken. These areas were:

- Citizen Focus, leading to the national Policing Pledge that police forces would have to take.
- Reducing bureaucracy and developing technology for police officers.
- Defining roles and leadership within the police service, focusing on development and deployment.
- Reinforcing collaboration between forces.
- Improving performance and effectiveness in policing.

=== Bill ===
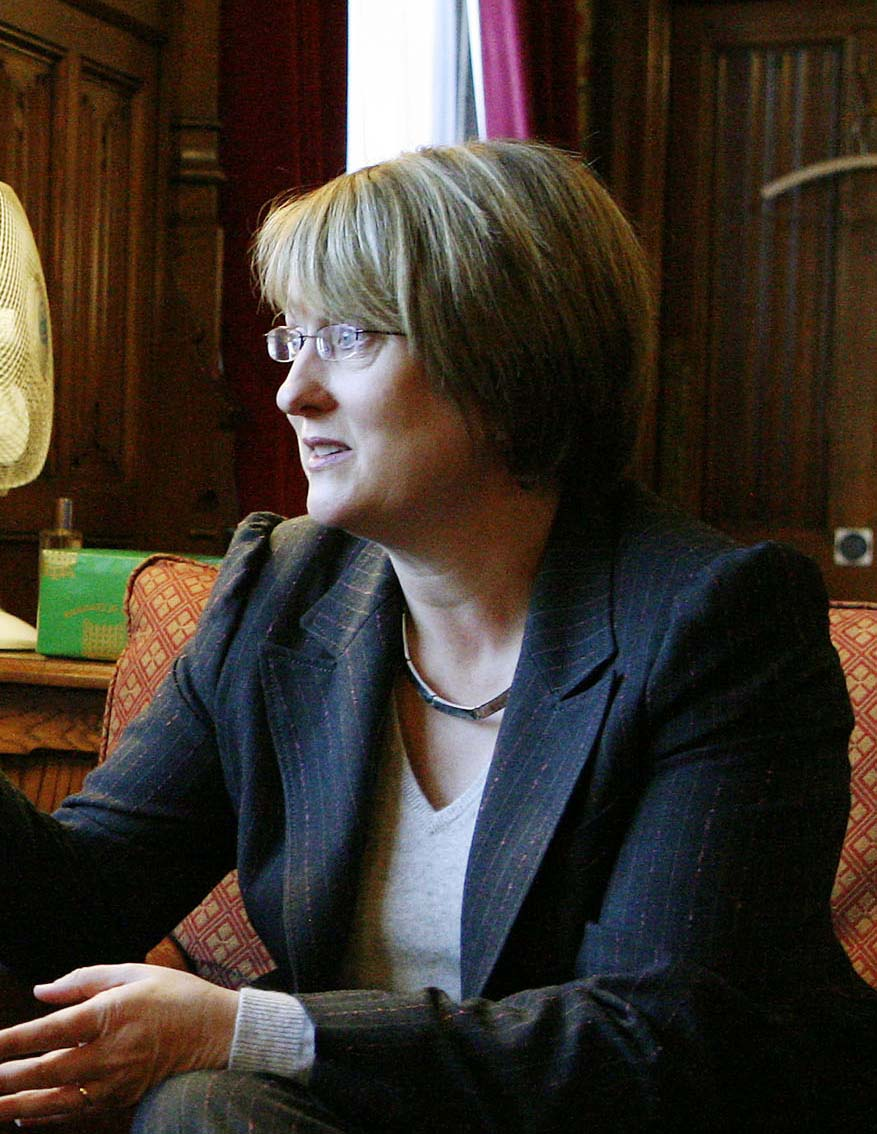
Jacqui Smith introduced the bill into the House of Commons

The Policing and Crime Bill was introduced to the House of Commons on 18 December 2008 and was passed to the House of Lords on 20 May 2009. During its passage in the House of Lords a number of amendments were proposed and agreed to. Among the amendments were that "it would now be an offence for a person to pay for sex with a prostitute if a third person had engaged in exploitative conduct of a kind likely to induce or encourage the prostitute to provide the sexual services. Exploitative conduct would mean the use of force, threats (whether or not relating to violence) or any other form of coercion or deception", that "sex encounter venues" be renamed "sexual entertainment venues" in the case of lap dancing clubs and that the provisions which allowed licensing authorities to impose discretionary licensing conditions on two or more premises were removed. On 12 November 2009 the act went through the Consideration of Lords/Commons amendments stage and was given Royal Assent on the same day.

== Police reform ==
The police service is reformed by adding a number of amendments to the Police Act 1996, which require police forces to have regard to the views of people in their area about policing in that area. It creates a Police Senior Appointments Panel which has authority regarding the appointment of senior police officers. It creates a legal framework to allow two or more police forces to collaborate and make agreements in order to increase effectiveness and efficiency, for payment or otherwise.

The act also amended the Regulation of Investigatory Powers Act 2000 to allow for the collaboration agreements that are created under this act.

== Sexual offences ==
=== Prostitution ===
The act also amends the law on loitering for the purposes of prostitution and also amends the law on soliciting. It removes the term "common prostitute" and introduces Engagement and Support Orders. These require a person involved in prostitution to attend meetings to investigate the “causes of their offending behaviour” with the aim of helping them find a route out of prostitution. The act also makes it illegal to pay for services from a prostitute whom a third person has subjected to force, threats, coercion or deception to perform those services. It is irrelevant whether the customer knew or could have known about this exploitation. The country where the sexual services are provided is also irrelevant.

When the changes were first announced by the Home Office, Dr Timothy Brain, Gloucestershire Chief Constable and ACPO Lead on Prostitution and Vice Matters praised the new measures, saying that "With these proposals the Government has clearly signalled its intention to bring about a sea change in attitudes towards prostitution."

=== Other amendments ===
The act amended the Sexual Offences Act 2003 to introduce closure orders on brothels, prevent time limits of complaints and make sexual offenders surrender their passports. The act also amended the Local Government (Miscellaneous Provisions) Act 1982 (c. 30) (control of sex establishments) to reclassify lap-dancing clubs as 'sexual entertainment venues' instead of 'entertainment venues', thus allowing the Government to tighten up regulation.

== Alcohol misuse and gang-related violence ==
There are a number of changes regarding the way that the police deal with alcohol misuse. The act amends the power that the police have under section 27 of the Violent Crime Reduction Act 2006 to require a person aged 16 years or over to leave a public place, to a person aged 10 years or older. This amendment also allows police officers to take a person under the age of sixteen home, or to a place of safety, if they are issued with a direction to leave under section 27 of the Violent Crime Reduction Act 2006. When these new powers were introduced on 29 January 2010, they were described as helping "officers to take a more robust approach and will hopefully reassure residents that we are continuing to target this issue."

The act deems it an offence for a person aged under 18 years to be in possession of alcohol in a relevant place without reasonable excuse, on 3 or more occasions, within 12 consecutive months. It also introduces a new mandatory code of practice for alcohol sales. This part of the act is applicable only to England and Wales and Northern Ireland.

The police and local authorities are now able to apply for injunctions to prevent gang related violence.

In October 2011, Gloucestershire Constabulary in partnership with Gloucester City Council successfully applied for gang injunctions against two local men who had been involved in persistent criminal and anti social behaviour.

== Further amendments ==
This Act introduced a number of amendments as follows:

- the criminal asset recovery scheme which was established under the Proceeds of Crime Act 2002;
- the Extradition Act 2003, and;
- the Aviation Security Act 1982 to provide security planning and risk assessments for aerodromes.

The act also deals with the policing of airports.

== Reception ==
The act has received a mixed reception during the passage of the bill, with much criticism about the parts of it which deal with prostitution coming from senior police officers, such as Commander Alan Gibson, head of the Metropolitan Police's anti-trafficking unit, who argued that the law with regards to criminalising men who pay for sex with prostitutes would be "very difficult to enforce". The Chief Constable for Gloucestershire Constabulary, Dr Tim Brain, told BBC News that he feared the complexity of the law may make gaining evidence hard. There was also criticism from the English Collective of Prostitutes, who said that the act will force prostitution further underground and prevent women from reporting violence and accessing health or other services.

ACPO commented on the bill, saying that "chief officers will welcome the introduction of powers to impose mandatory conditions on the supply of alcohol", and "includes other measures we welcome, such as those to close brothels and give police powers to protect neighbourhoods from the nuisance and harm they create; and strengthened legislation to support police operations to recover the proceeds of crime."

There has been much praise with the increased accountability that is introduced with the passing of the act with the LGA stating they supported "the core principles behind the Bill of empowering local people by giving them a stronger voice in police decision-making, and greater freedoms and discretion for the police to concentrate on local policing priorities." and the APA saying they welcomed "the government’s recognition of the valuable role of police authorities in holding police to account on behalf of local people."

The Lap Dancing Association opposed reclassifying lap-dancing clubs as "sexual entertainment venues" instead of "entertainment venues", and introducing a licensing system for clubs which allowed local authorities to decide the number and location of lap-dancing clubs in their area. Chris Knight, vice-chairman of the LDA, said that the cost of the additional licence required to run a lap dancing club from 2010 could affect many businesses and questioned the right of local authorities to make licensing decisions on "emotive and moralistic grounds". Peter Stringfellow criticised the powers to control lap-dancing clubs, saying the change was "unnecessary" and that he would be appealing to the European Court of Human Rights if his club licences were not renewed.

=== Fall in number of sex establishments in England ===
In February 2018 it was reported that the number of sex establishments in England had fallen by a third. A freedom of information request by the BBC revealed that between 2013 and 2018 the number of sex establishments licences issued by councils in England had dropped from 386 to 256.

Decline in sex establishment licences in England – active licences issued by local authorities

Fall in active sex establishment licences in major cities in England
City	Percentage (%) change between 2013 and 2018
Leeds	0
Nottingham	0
Bristol	−14
Sheffield	−17
Manchester	−30
Birmingham	−36
Newcastle	−44
Liverpool	−50
London	−65

== See also ==
- Prostitution in the United Kingdom
