= Legitimacy Act 1926 =

Act of the Parliament of the United Kingdom

Legitimacy Act 1926 (Note: Section 12(1).)
- Act of Parliament
- Parliament of the United Kingdom
- Long title: An Act to amend the law relating to children born out of wedlock.
- Citation: 16 & 17 Geo. 5. c. 60
- Territorial extent: England and Wales (Note: Section 12(3).)

Dates
- Royal assent: 15 December 1926
- Commencement: 1 January 1927 (Note: Section 12(2).)

Other legislation
- Amends: Legitimacy Declaration Act 1858
- Amended by: Matrimonial Causes Act 1950; Births and Deaths Registration Act 1953; Legitimacy Act 1959; Family Law Reform Act 1969; Criminal Justice Act 1972; Children Act 1975; Legitimacy Act 1976

Status: Partially repealed

Text of statute as originally enacted

Revised text of statute as amended

Text of the Legitimacy Act 1926 as in force today (including any amendments) within the United Kingdom, from legislation.gov.uk.

The Legitimacy Act 1926 (16 & 17 Geo. 5. c. 60) is an act of the Parliament of the United Kingdom. The purpose of the act was to amend the law relating to children born out of wedlock.

== Provisions ==
The fundamental principle of the act is exposed in section 1(2):

Nothing in this Act shall operate to legitimate a person whose father or mother was married to a third person when the illegitimate person was born.

The act allowed children to be legitimised by the subsequent marriage of their parents, provided that neither parent had been married to a third party at the time of the birth. In those circumstances, the legitimised birth was re-entered in the birth indexes for that year (sometimes many years after the original birth). The original entry would be annotated to refer to the new entry.

The act was modified by the Legitimacy Act 1959 (7 & 8 Eliz. 2. c. 73), which extended it to children whose parent had been married to somebody else when they were born.
