= Aavas Financiers =

Jaipur based housing finance company

Aavas Financiers, also known as Aavas, is a housing finance company headquartered in Jaipur, Rajasthan. Founded on February 23, 2011, it provides home loan in rural and semi-urban locations across India.

As of March 31, 2026, the company operates 435 branches across 15 states and Union Territories in India.

== History ==
Aavas was incorporated in February 2011. It formally started its operations in March 2012.

In January 2013 the company was converted from Private Limited to Public Limited company.

In March 2017, the name of the Company was changed to "AAVAS FINANCIERS LIMITED" vide a fresh Certificate of Incorporation (COI) dated 29th March 2017.

The company issued its IPO in October 2018. Shortly after the IPO, CDC Group invested ₹200 crore in Aavas.

In September 2019, the company received ₹345 crore investment from International Finance Corporation, a member of the World Bank Group. In March 2020, Aavas signed an agreement with Asian Development Bank for receiving loan amount of $60 million specially targeting towards the 'women in lower income group'. In December 2020, to promote the concept of Green Housing, International Finance Corporation signed an agreement with the company.

== Operations ==
As of March 31, 2026, Aavas has 435 branches operating in 15 states and UT of India. Presently the company is headed by Manu Singh as CEO.

The equity shares of Aavas are listed on Bombay Stock Exchange where it is a constituent of the BSE 150 Midcap, and the National Stock Exchange of India where it is a constituent of Nifty Midcap 150.
