= Overseas Resources Development Act 1959 =

Act of the Parliament of the United Kingdom

Overseas Resources Development Act 1959 (Note: Section 22.)
- Act of Parliament
- Parliament of the United Kingdom
- Long title: An Act to consolidate the Overseas Resources Development Acts, 1948 to 1958, other than the provisions thereof relating to the Overseas Food Corporation.
- Citation: 7 & 8 Eliz. 2. c. 23
- Territorial extent: United Kingdom

Dates
- Royal assent: 25 March 1959
- Commencement: 25 March 1959 (Note: The Acts of Parliament (Commencement) Act 1793.)
- Repealed: 23 April 1978
Other legislation
Amends	See § Repealed enactments
Repeals/revokes	See § Repealed enactments
Amended by	National Loans Act 1968; Overseas Resources Development Act 1969; Statute Law (Repeals) Act 1974
Repealed by	Commonwealth Development Corporation Act 1978

Status: Repealed

Text of statute as originally enacted

The Overseas Resources Development Act 1959 (7 & 8 Eliz. 2. c. 23) was an act of the Parliament of the United Kingdom that consolidated enactments relating to the Colonial Development Corporation.

== Provisions ==
=== Repealed enactments ===
Section 21(1) of the act repealed 6 enactments, listed in the second schedule to the act.

Citation	Short title	Extent of repeal
11 & 12 Geo. 6. c. 15	Overseas Resources Development Act 1948	The whole act.
12 & 13 Geo. 6. c. 65	Overseas Resources Development Act 1949	The whole act.
14 & 15 Geo. 6. c. 20	Overseas Resources Development Act 1951	The whole act.
2 & 3 Eliz. 2. c. 71	Overseas Resources Development Act 1954	Section five.
4 & 5 Eliz. 2. c. 71	Overseas Resources Development Act 1956	The whole act.
6 & 7 Eliz. 2. c. 15	Overseas Resources Development Act 1958	The whole act.

== Subsequent developments ==
Section 21(1) of, and schedule 2 to, the act were repealed by section 1 of, and part XI of the schedule to, the Statute Law (Repeals) Act 1974, which came into force on 27 June 1974.

The whole act was repealed by section 18(1) of, and schedule 2 to, the Commonwealth Development Corporation Act 1978, which came into force on 23 April 1978.
