= Betting Duties Act 1963 =

Act of the Parliament of the United Kingdom

Betting Duties Act 1963 (Note: Section 7(1).)
- Act of Parliament
- Parliament of the United Kingdom
- Long title: An Act to consolidate certain enactments relating to the pool betting and bookmakers' licence duties.
- Citation: 1963 c. 3
- Territorial extent: England and Wales; Scotland; (Note: Section 7(3).)

Dates
- Royal assent: 28 February 1963
- Commencement: 28 March 1963 (Note: Section 7(4). The Betting, Gaming and Lotteries Act 1963 came into force one month after royal assent, pursuant to section 58(3) thereof.)
- Repealed: 11 June 1972 (Note: Section 30(3) of the Betting and Gaming Duties Act 1972.)
Other legislation
Repeals/revokes	See § Repealed enactments
Amended by	Statute Law (Repeals) Act 1974
Repealed by	Betting and Gaming Duties Act 1972
Relates to	Betting, Gaming and Lotteries Act 1963

Status: Repealed

Text of statute as originally enacted

The Betting Duties Act 1963 (c. 3) was an act of the Parliament of the United Kingdom that consolidated enactments relating to the pool betting and bookmakers' licence duties in Great Britain.

== Repealed enactments ==
Section 6(1) of the act repealed 9 enactments, listed in schedule 3 to the act.

Citation	Short title	Extent of repeal
11 & 12 Geo. 6. c. 9	Finance (No. 2) Act 1947	Section 6, except subsection (3). Schedule 5.
11 & 12 Geo. 6. c. 49	Finance Act 1948	Sections 14 and 15. Schedule 6, except paragraph 3(3).
14 Geo. 6. c. 15	Finance Act 1950	Section 17.
15 & 16 Geo. 6 & 1 Eliz. 2. c. 33	Finance Act 1952	Sections 4 and 5.
15 & 16 Geo. 6 & 1 Eliz. 2. c. 44	Customs and Excise Act 1952	In Part II of Schedule 10, paragraphs 30 and 31.
4 & 5 Eliz. 2. c. 45	Small Lotteries and Gaming Act 1956	Section 5(2).
8 & 9 Eliz. 2. c. 60	Betting and Gaming Act 1960	In Schedule 4, paragraph 7.
9 & 10 Eliz. 2. c. 36	Finance Act 1961	Section 4. Section 5(1) and (2).
10 & 11 Eliz. 2. c. 44	Finance Act 1962	Section 1(2)(d) and (4)(d).

== Subsequent developments ==
The whole act was repealed by section 29(2) of, and schedule 7 to, the Betting and Gaming Duties Act 1972, which came into force on 11 June 1972.

Section 6(1) of, and schedule 3 to, the act were repealed by section 1 of, and part XI of the schedule to, the Statute Law (Repeals) Act 1974, which came into force on 27 June 1974.
