= Statute Law (Repeals) Act 1974 =

Act of the Parliament of the United Kingdom

Statute Law (Repeals) Act 1974 (Note: Section 4.)
- Act of Parliament
- Parliament of the United Kingdom
- Long title: An Act to promote the reform of the statute law by the repeal, in accordance with recommendations of the Law Commission and the Scottish Law Commission, of certain enactments which (except in so far as their effect is preserved) are no longer of practical utility.
- Citation: 1974 c. 22
- Introduced by: Elwyn Jones, Baron Elwyn-Jones (Lords)
- Territorial extent: England and Wales; Scotland; Northern Ireland (except section 2); Jersey (Note: Section 3(2). The Church Building Act 1831 (Repeal) (Jersey) Order 1983 (SI 1983/763).); Isle of Man (Note: Section 3(2). The Statute Law Repeals (Isle of Man) Order 1984 (SI 1984/1692).); (Note: Section 3.)

Dates
- Royal assent: 27 June 1974
- Commencement: 27 June 1974 (Note: The Acts of Parliament (Commencement) Act 1793.)
Other legislation
Amends	Industrial Assurance and Friendly Societies Act 1948; See § Repealed enactments
Repeals/revokes	See § Repealed enactments
Amended by	Statute Law (Repeals) Act 1998
Relates to	See Statute Law (Repeals) Act

Status: Amended

Text of statute as originally enacted

The Statute Law (Repeals) Act 1974 (c. 22) is an act of the Parliament of the United Kingdom.

The act repealed 54 acts in full and another 310 acts in part, passed between 1581 and 1972.

As of 2026, the act remains partly in the United Kingdom

== Background ==
The act implemented recommendations contained in the fifth report on statute law revision, by the Law Commission and the Scottish Law Commission.

== Provisions ==
Section 2 of the act inserted section 17A of the Industrial and Friendly Societies Act 1948 (11 & 12 Geo. 6. c. 39).

The power conferred by section 3(2) of the act has been exercised by:

- The Church Building Act 1831 (Repeal) (Jersey) Order 1983 (SI 1983/763)
- The Statute Law Repeals (Isle of Man) Order 1984 (SI 1984/1692)

=== Repealed enactments ===
Section 1 of the act repealed 364 enactments, listed in parts I to XI of the schedule to the act.

==== Part I: Enactments relating to security required from public officers ====
Part I — Enactments Relating to Security Required from Public Officers
Citation	Short title	Extent of repeal
50 Geo. 3. c. 85	Government Offices Security Act 1810	The whole act.
52 Geo. 3. c. 66	Security of Public Officers Act 1812	The whole act.
6 & 7 Will. 4. c. 28	Government Offices Security Act 1836	The whole act.
1 & 2 Vict. c. 61	Government Offices Security Act 1838	The whole act.
38 & 39 Vict. c. 64	Government Officers (Security) Act 1875	The whole act.
53 & 54 Vict. c. 21	Inland Revenue Regulation Act 1890	Section 5.
5 & 6 Geo. 6. c. 21	Finance Act 1942	In Schedule 11, in Part II, the entry relating to the Government Offices Security Act 1836.
15 & 16 Geo. 6 & 1 Eliz. 2. c. 44	Customs and Excise Act 1952	Section 292(3).

==== Part II: Financial enactments ====
Part II — Financial Enactments
Citation	Short title	Description	Extent of repeal
30 & 31 Vict. c. 39	Metropolitan Police (Receiver) Act 1867	The Metropolitan Police (Receiver) Act 1867.	In section 1, the words from " and shall " onwards.
32 & 33 Vict. c. 3	Lord Napier's Salary Act 1869	An Act to enable Lord Napier of Magdala to receive the full benefit of the salary of Member of Council for the Presidency of Bombay, or as holding any other office in India, notwithstanding his being in receipt of an annuity granted to him under the Act 31 & 32 Victoria, chapter 91.	The whole act.
53 & 54 Vict. c. 21	Inland Revenue Regulation Act 1890	The Inland Revenue Regulation Act 1890.	In section 39, the definitions of " Goods ", " Plaintiff " and " defendant ".
5 & 6 Geo. 5. c. 89	Finance (No. 2) Act 1915	The Finance (No. 2) Act 1915.	Section 45(8).
11 & 12 Geo. 5. c. 65	Trade Facilities Act 1921	The Trade Facilities Act 1921.	The whole act.
13 Geo. 5. Sess. 2. c. 4	Trade Facilities and Loans Guarantee Act 1922	The Trade Facilities and Loans Guarantee Act 1922 (Session 2).	Sections 1 and 3(2).
15 & 16 Geo. 5. c. 36	Finance Act 1925	The Finance Act 1925.	In section 25(3), paragraph (b) and the word " or " immediately preceding that paragraph.
16 & 17 Geo. 5. c. 3	Trade Facilities Act 1926	The Trade Facilities Act 1926.	The whole act.
19 & 20 Geo. 5. c. 29	Government Annuities Act 1929	The Government Annuities Act 1929.	Sections 30 and 65.
12, 13 & 14 Geo. 6. c. 92	India (Consequential Provision) Act 1949	The India (Consequential Provision) Act 1949.	In section 1(4), the words " or the growing produce thereof ", in both places.
14 Geo. 6. c. 12	Foreign Compensation Act 1950	The Foreign Compensation Act 1950.	In section 1(2), the words " without licence in mortmain ".
10 & 11 Eliz. 2. c. 44	Finance Act 1962	The Finance Act 1962.	In section 33(1), the words from " other than " onwards. In Schedule 11, Part VI.
1965 c. 25	Finance Act 1965	The Finance Act 1965.	In section 94(1), the words from " and of " to " Schedule D) ".
1969 c. 32	Finance Act 1969	The Finance Act 1969.	Sections 3(8) and 5. In Schedule 19, in paragraph 16(2), the words " and short-term ".
1970 c. 24	Finance Act 1970	The Finance Act 1970.	Section 1. In Schedule 1, paragraph 14.
1972 c. 25	Betting and Gaming Duties Act 1972	The Betting and Gaming Duties Act 1972.	In Schedule 5, paragraph 6.

==== Part III: Enactments relating to land acquisition powers ====
Part III — Enactments Relating to Land Acquisition Powers
Citation	Short title	Extent of repeal
8 & 9 Vict. c. 18	Lands Clauses Consolidation Act 1845	Sections 59 and 60. In section 61, the words from the beginning to " annexed to ", the word " and " (following the word " surveyor "), the words " together therewith " and the words " and other documents ". Sections 135 and 140.
1965 c. 56	Compulsory Purchase Act 1965	Sections 24(5) and 29(2). In section 30, subsections (1) and (2), in subsection (3) the words " section 11(1) of " and the words from " and notwithstanding " to the end of the subsection, and subsection (4). In section 33, in subsection (2)(b) the words " section 8(1) and " and the words from " but no person " to the end of the paragraph, in subsection (3), paragraph (a), in paragraph (b) the words " and 30(3) ", and paragraphs (c) and (d), and subsection (4). In section 34, subsections (2) to (5). In Schedule 1, paragraph 6(5). In Schedule 2, paragraph 1(2) and in paragraph 1(3), the words from the beginning to the first " valuation, and " and the words " and declaration together ". In Schedule 6, in the amendment of the Civil Aviation Act 1949 the words from " together with " to " superfluous land) ".
1967 c. 10	Forestry Act 1967	In Schedule 5, in paragraph 11(3) paragraphs (a), (c), (d) and (e), and paragraph 11(4).

==== Part IV: Enactments relating to legal proceedings and the legal profession ====
Part IV — Enactments Relating to Legal Proceedings and the Legal Profession
Citation	Short title	Extent of repeal
25 & 26 Vict. c. 53	Land Registry Act 1862	Section 135.
32 & 33 Vict. c. 68	Evidence Further Amendment Act 1869	Section 3.
12, 13 & 14 Geo. 6. c. 21	Solicitors, Public Notaries, &c. Act 1949	Section 1(1) and (5). In section 2(2), the proviso. Schedule 2.
2 & 3 Eliz. 2. c. 41	Juries Act 1954	The whole act.
7 & 8 Eliz. 2. c. 56	Rights of Light Act 1959	Section 1.
Act of the Parliament of Northern Ireland
2 & 3 Geo. 6. c. 13 (N.I.)	Matrimonial Causes Act (Northern Ireland) 1939	Section 25(1).

==== Part V: Enactments relating only to Scotland ====
Part V — Enactments Relating Only to Scotland
Citation	Short title	Description	Extent of repeal
5 Geo. 1. c. 29	Church Patronage (Scotland) Act 1718	The Church Patronage (Scotland) Act 1718.	The whole act.
21 Geo. 2. c. 34	Cattle Theft (Scotland) Act 1747	The Cattle Theft (Scotland) Act 1747.	The whole act.
6 Geo. 4. c. 22	Jurors (Scotland) Act 1825	The Jurors (Scotland) Act 1825.	In section 7, the words " or judge admiral " and the words " or to the judge admiral ". In section 20, the words " and in the court of the judge admiral ".
7 Geo. 4. c. 38	Admiralty Offences Act 1826	The Admiralty Offences Act 1826.	The whole act.
11 & 12 Vict. c. 36	Entail Amendment Act 1848	The Entail Amendment Act 1848.	In section 26, the words " or in redemption of the land tax affecting such entailed estate,". Section 41.
18 & 19 Vict. c. 113	Inverness Bridge (Treasury Grant) Act 1855	An Act to extend the provisions of an Act of the fourteenth and fifteenth years of Her present Majesty, for rebuilding the bridge over the River Ness at Inverness.	The whole act.
4 & 5 Geo. 5. c. 43	Entail (Scotland) Act 1914	The Entail (Scotland) Act 1914.	Section 9.
12 & 13 Geo. 5. c. 52	Allotments (Scotland) Act 1922	The Allotments (Scotland) Act 1922.	Section 2(10).
16 & 17 Geo. 5. c. 50	Burgh Registers (Scotland) Act 1926	The Burgh Registers (Scotland) Act 1926.	In section 1(1), the words from " Provided that " onwards. Sections 1(2) and 4. Schedule 2.
2 & 3 Geo. 6. c. 31	Civil Defence Act 1939	The Civil Defence Act 1939.	Section 74(2) and (4).
9 & 10 Geo. 6. c. 80	Atomic Energy Act 1946	The Atomic Energy Act 1946.	In Schedule 1, paragraph 9 from " and rules " onwards.
10 & 11 Geo. 6. c. 53	Town and Country Planning (Scotland) Act 1947	The Town and Country Planning (Scotland) Act 1947.	In section 57(2)(a), the words from the second " and " onwards. In section 105(1), the word " one " and the words " six and eight ". Section 106.
12, 13 & 14 Geo. 6. c. 61	Housing (Scotland) Act 1949	The Housing (Scotland) Act 1949.	Section 40.
14 Geo. 6. c. 38	Allotments (Scotland) Act 1950	The Allotments (Scotland) Act 1950.	Sections 1(2), 2(2), 3(4), 4(4) and 14. The Schedule.
5 & 6 Eliz. 2. c. 38	Housing and Town Development (Scotland) Act 1957	The Housing and Town Development (Scotland) Act 1957.	Section 9(8). In section 13, in subsection (1), paragraph (b) and the word " and " immediately preceding that paragraph, and in subsection (3) the words " subsection (1) of section thirty-six,". Section 28(2). Schedule 3.
9 & 10 Eliz. 2. c. 58	Crofters (Scotland) Act 1961	The Crofters (Scotland) Act 1961.	In section 2(6), the words from " and section four " onwards. Sections 4(4), 6(6), 9(12), 10, 11( ) and 18(2). In Schedule 1, paragraph 6, and in paragraph 10, sub-paragraphs (a), (c) and (d). Schedule 3.
1966 c. 49	Housing (Scotland) Act 1966	The Housing (Scotland) Act 1966.	In section 208(1), the definition of " agricultural population ". In section 212(1), the words from " in the case of ", where they first occur, to " Act, and ". In Schedule 10, Part I.
1968 c. 31	Housing (Financial Provisions) (Scotland) Act 1968	The Housing (Financial Provisions) (Scotland) Act 1968.	Section 53(2). In section 53(3), the words " or where assistance is given under section 44 of this Act ," and the words " or that assistance has been so given, as the case may be,". In section 53(4), the words " or by section 45 of this Act " and the words from " or by way of assistance " to the words " may be,". In section 53(5), the words " or of section 45 of this Act," and the words from " or by way of assistance " onwards.
1969 c. 34	Housing (Scotland) Act 1969	The Housing (Scotland) Act 1969.	Section 65. In Schedule 6, paragraphs 33 and 34.
Acts of the Parliament of Scotland
1581 (c. 2)	Stipends Act 1581	The Stipends Act 1581.	The whole act.
1592 (c. 9)	Deposition of Ministers Act 1592	The Deposition of Ministers Act 1592.	The whole act.
1617 (c. 19)	Dovecotes Act 1617	The Dovecotes Act 1617.	The whole act.
1663 (c. 31)	Manses Act 1663	The Manses Act 1663.	The whole act.
1695 (c. 54)	Soil Preservation Act 1695	The Soil Preservation Act 1695.	The whole act.

==== Part VI: Transport enactments ====
Part VI — Transport Enactments
Citation	Short title	Extent of repeal
10 & 11 Geo. 6. c. 49	Transport Act 1947	Sections 12 to 14, 28, 69, 125, 126 and 128. Schedule 3.
10 & 11 Eliz. 2. c. 46	Transport Act 1962	In section 22, subsections (1) and (4), and in subsection (5) the words from the beginning to " with the vesting date ". Sections 23, 33 and 34(1) to (7). In section 36, in subsection (5), the words from the beginning to " of the Bank of England " and subsection (8). Sections 38, 43(9), 56(19), 60, 76 to 78, 80, 84(1), 86(7) and 95(1), (2) and (5). Schedules 3 to 5. In Schedule 6, in paragraph 1, sub-paragraphs (2) and (4), in sub-paragraph (5) the words from " Until a scheme " to the end of the sub-paragraph, and in sub-paragraph (6) the words from " in sub-paragraph (2) " to " ' assurance ' and ". In Schedule 7, paragraphs 3 and 4, paragraphs 18 to 22, and in paragraph 23 sub-paragraphs (1) and (3). Schedule 12.
1966 c. 17	Transport Finances Act 1966	The whole act.
1968 c. 73	Transport Act 1968	Sections 38(4), 43(4), 49(6), 54(8) and 55(5). In section 94(8), paragraph (b) and the word " and " immediately preceding that paragraph. Sections 107(4), 112(7), 133 and 165. Schedule 18.

==== Part VII: Ecclesiastical enactments ====
Part VII — Ecclesiastical Enactments
Citation	Short title	Extent of repeal
58 Geo. 3. c. 45	Church Building Act 1818	The whole act.
59 Geo. 3. c. 134	Church Building Act 1819	The whole act.
3 Geo. 4. c. 72	Church Building Act 1822	The whole act except sections 13 and 28. In section 13, the words from " and it shall be lawful " to " finally completed ".
5 Geo. 4. c. 103	Church Building Act 1824	The whole act.
7 & 8 Geo. 4. c. 72	Church Building Act 1827	The whole act.
1 & 2 Will. 4. c. 38	Church Building Act 1831	The whole act.
2 & 3 Will. 4. c. 61	Church Building Act 1832	The whole act.
1 & 2 Vict. c. 106	Pluralities Act 1838	Sections 2 to 27. In section 95, the words from " Every curate shall quit " to " and in all other cases ". Section 106.
1 & 2 Vict. c. 107	Church Building Act 1838	The whole act except section 14.
2 & 3 Vict. c. 49	Church Building Act 1839	Sections 1 to 5 and 8 to 11.
3 & 4 Vict. c. 60	Church Building Act 1840	The whole act.
3 & 4 Vict. c. 113	Ecclesiastical Commissioners Act 1840	Sections 32, 71, 72 and 74.
4 & 5 Vict. c. 39	Ecclesiastical Commissioners Act 1841	Sections 3 and 10.
5 & 6 Vict. c. 108	Ecclesiastical Leasing Act 1842	Sections 12 and 13.
6 & 7 Vict. c. 37	New Parishes Act 1843	The whole act except section 6. In section 6, the words " Notwithstanding the charge by this Act created ", the words from " and that the consent " to " notwithstanding such charge " and the words from " unless it be deemed " to " hereby empowered to do ".
7 & 8 Vict. c. 56	Church Building (Banns and Marriages) Act 1844	The whole act.
7 & 8 Vict. c. 94	New Parishes Act 1844	The whole act.
8 & 9 Vict. c. 70	Church Building Act 1845	The whole act.
9 & 10 Vict. c. 68	Church Building (Burial Service in Chapels) Act 1846	The whole act.
11 & 12 Vict. c. 37	Church Building Act 1848	The whole act.
13 & 14 Vict. c. 94	Ecclesiastical Commissioners Act 1850	Section 27.
13 & 14 Vict. c. 98	Pluralities Act 1850	Sections 4, 7, 8 and 11.
14 & 15 Vict. c. 97	Church Building Act 1851	The whole act.
17 & 18 Vict. c. 32	Church Building Act 1854	The whole act.
19 & 20 Vict. c. 104	New Parishes Act 1856	The whole act.
21 & 22 Vict. c. 57	Ecclesiastical Leasing Act 1858	Section 10.
23 & 24 Vict. c. 142	Union of Benefices Act 1860	The whole act.
28 & 29 Vict. c. 42	District Church Tithes Act 1865	The whole act.
32 & 33 Vict. c. 94	New Parishes Acts and Church Building Acts Amendment Act 1869	Sections 1, 8, 10, 11, 12 and 13.
34 & 35 Vict. c. 90	Union of Benefices Acts Amendment Act 1871	The whole act.
35 & 36 Vict. c. 14	Diocesan Boundaries Act 1872	The whole act.
37 & 38 Vict. c. 63	Archdeaconries and Rural Deaneries Act 1874	The whole act.
47 & 48 Vict. c. 65	New Parishes Acts and Church Building Acts Amendment Act 1884	The whole act.
50 & 51 Vict. c. 68	Pluralities Act 1887	The whole act.
61 & 62 Vict. c. 23	Union of Benefices Act 1898	The whole act.

==== Part VIII: Improvement of Land Acts ====
Part VIII — Improvement of Land Acts
Citation	Short title	Extent of repeal
27 & 28 Vict. c. 114	Improvement of Land Act 1864	In section 2, the words from " and as regards " onwards. In section 3, the words " the Public Money Drainage Act 1846 and of " and the word " other ". In section 7, the words " or Ireland ". Section 17 except the words " Before the Commissioners shall sanction any improvements, notice shall be given of the application by a notice in writing, given to the nearest heir or heirs of entail, not exceeding three, and to the holders of every heritable security on such lands appearing upon the records; and in such notices shall be stated the maximum amount which it is proposed to charge in respect of the improvements, and the greatest and least terms over which it is proposed that the rentcharge should be spread; and the Commissioners shall not sanction the improvements until one month shall have elapsed from the service of such notices, of which service of all necessary notices as aforesaid, the landowner shall, if required by the Commissioners, satisfy them by one or more statutory declarations made by him or on his behalf ". In section 19, the words " or Ireland respectively ". In section 20, the words " and Ireland ". In section 21, the words " or Ireland ", where first occurring, the words " or Ireland respectively ", and the words from " as to lands in Ireland " to " order direct ". In section 23, the words " and twenty-second " and the words " be ; and ". In section 29, the words " advertisement and ". In section 32, the words " or Ireland ". In section 56, the words from the beginning to " registry office; and ". In section 69, the words " Ireland or ".
62 & 63 Vict. c. 46	Improvement of Land Act 1899	Section 6.
15 & 16 Geo. 5. c. 48	Improvement of Land Act (1899) Amendment Act 1925	The whole act.

==== Part IX: Enactments relating to the Board of Trade ====
Part IX — Enactments Relating to the Board of Trade
Citation	Short title	Extent of repeal
22 & 23 Geo. 5. c. 53	Ottawa Agreements Act 1932	In section 12(1), the words from " and any other thing " onwards.
2 & 3 Geo. 6. c. 31	Civil Defence Act 1939	Section 86.
2 & 3 Geo. 6. c. 57	War Risks Insurance Act 1939	Section 20.
2 & 3 Geo. 6. c. 120	Restriction of Advertisement (War Risks Insurance) Act 1939	Section 5.
6 & 7 Geo. 6. c. 21	War Damage Act 1943	Section 122.
12, 13 & 14 Geo. 6. c. 36	War Damage (Public Utility Undertakings, &c.) Act 1949	Section 32.

==== Part X: Miscellaneous enactments ====
Part X — Miscellaneous Enactments
Citation	Short title	Extent of repeal
7 & 8 Vict. c. 101	Poor Law Amendment Act 1844	The whole act.
20 Vict. c. 19	Extra-Parochial Places Act 1857	The whole act.
19 & 20 Geo. 5. c. 17	Local Government Act 1929	In Schedule 10, paragraphs 15 and 18.
3 & 4 Geo. 6. c. 10	Industrial Assurance and Friendly Societies (Emergency Protection from Forfeiture) Act 1940	The whole act.
14 Geo. 6. c. 28	Shops Act 1950	In section 2(1), paragraph (a), in paragraph (b) the words " where the foregoing paragraph does not apply ", and the proviso. Section 2(2) and (4). In section 4, paragraph (a). Section 5. In section 6, paragraph (a), and in paragraph (b) the words " where the foregoing paragraph does not apply ". Sections 7, 8(6), 41(6) and 42(4). In section 74(1), the definition of the expression " the winter months ". Schedule 8.
1 & 2 Eliz. 2. c. 47	Emergency Laws (Miscellaneous Provisions) Act 1953	Section 9. In section 13, the word " nine ", the words from " and paragraphs " to " thereto ", and the words from " and Part II " onwards. Section 14(2). In Schedule 1, paragraphs 1 to 4. Schedule 3.
8 & 9 Eliz. 2. c. 61	Mental Health (Scotland) Act 1960	Section 113(2). In Schedule 4, the entries relating to the Land Tax Redemption Act 1802, the Defence Act 1842, the Registration of Births, Deaths and Marriages (Scotland) Act 1854, the Building Societies Act 1874, the Trade Union Act Amendment Act 1876, the Naval Enlistment Act 1884, the Children and Young Persons (Scotland) Act 1937, the Army Act 1955 and the Air Force Act 1955. Schedule 5.
9 & 10 Eliz. 2. c. 55	Crown Estate Act 1961	Section 9(2) and (4). In section 10(3), the words from the beginning to " Alderney, and ". Schedule 3.
10 & 11 Eliz. 2. c. 30	Northern Ireland Act 1962	Sections 25(1)(c), 28 and 30(2). In Schedule 1, in the entry relating to section 6 of the Evidence by Commission Act 1859 the words from " the words ' and for ' " to " omitted and ", the entry relating to the Debtors Act (Ireland) 1872, in the entry relating to section 124 of the Bankruptcy (Ireland) Amendment Act 1872 the words from " and the words " onwards, the entries relating to sections 60 and 65 of the Supreme Court of Judicature Act (Ireland) 1877 and the Telegraph Act 1878, in the entry relating to the Settled Land Act 1882 the words from " and subsection (5) " onwards, the entries relating to sections 9 and 11 of the Guardianship of Infants Act 1886, section 33 of the Land Law (Ireland) Act 1887, the Railway and Canal Traffic Act 1888 and section 3 of the Supreme Court of Judicature (Ireland) Amendment Act 1888, in the entry relating to the County Court Appeals (Ireland) Act 1889 the words from " and subsections " onwards, the entries relating to the Purchase of Land (Ireland) Act 1891, the Finance Act 1894, section 3 of the Supreme Court of Judicature (Ireland) (No. 2) Act 1897, the Merchant Shipping Act 1906, the Town Tenants (Ireland) Act 1906, the Finance (1909–10) Act 1910, the Trade Union Act 1913 and the Carriage by Air Act 1932, in the entry relating to the Northern Ireland Land Purchase (Winding Up) Act 1935 the words " the words ' and orders ' shall be omitted " and the words " and the words ' or orders ' shall be omitted ", the entries relating to the Requisitioned Land and War Works Act 1945, section 48 of the Patents Act 1949, Schedule 1 to the Registered Designs Act 1949, the Election Commissioners Act 1949, the Therapeutic Substances Act 1956, the Copyright Act 1956, the Defence Contracts Act 1958, the Preferential Payments in Bankruptcy Act (Northern Ireland) 1933, the Motor Vehicles and Road Traffic Act (Northern Ireland) 1934 and the Summary Jurisdiction and Criminal Justice Act (Northern Ireland) 1935, in the entry relating to the Arbitration Act (Northern Ireland) 1937 the words from " and the words " to the end of the entry, in the entry relating to the Law Reform (Miscellaneous Provisions) Act (Northern Ireland) 1937 the words from " and paragraph (a) " to the end of the entry, the entries relating to the Industries Development Act (Northern Ireland) 1945 and the Transport Act (Northern Ireland) 1948, in the entry relating to the Roads Act (Northern Ireland) 1948 the words " and the words ' in manner provided by those rules ' shall be omitted ", the entries relating to the Adoption of Children Act (Northern Ireland) 1950, the Law Reform (Miscellaneous Provisions) Act (Northern Ireland) 1951, the Transport (Special Inquiries) Act (Northern Ireland) 1951, the Minerals (Miscellaneous Provisions) Act (Northern Ireland) 1959 and the Nurses and Midwives Act (Northern Ireland) 1959. Schedules 3 and 4.

==== Part XI: Spent repealing enactments ====
Part XI — Spent Repealing Enactments
Citation	Short title	Extent of repeal
45 & 46 Vict. c. 50	Municipal Corporations Act 1882	Schedule 1.
23 & 24 Geo. 5. c. 35	Trout (Scotland) Act 1933	Section 5.
14 & 15 Geo. 6. c. 26	Salmon and Freshwater Fisheries (Protection) (Scotland) Act 1951	Section 25(2). Schedule 2.
14 & 15 Geo. 6. c. 30	Sea Fish Industry Act 1951	Section 29(2). Schedule 5.
14 & 15 Geo. 6. c. 36	Criminal Law Amendment Act 1951	The whole act.
14 & 15 Geo. 6. c. 43	Finance Act 1951	Section 44(9). Schedule 7.
14 & 15 Geo. 6. c. 53	Midwives Act 1951	Section 34(1). Schedule 2.
14 & 15 Geo. 6. c. 54	Midwives (Scotland) Act 1951	Section 36(1). Schedule 2.
14 & 15 Geo. 6. c. 55	Nurses (Scotland) Act 1951	Section 35(1). Schedule 5.
14 & 15 Geo. 6. c. 60	Mineral Workings Act 1951	Section 43(3).
14 & 15 Geo. 6. c. 63	Rag Flock and Other Filling Materials Act 1951	Section 37.
14 & 15 Geo. 6. c. 64	Rivers (Prevention of Pollution) Act 1951	In section 1(1), the words from " and this Act " onwards. Section 12(2). Schedules 1 and 3.
14 & 15 Geo. 6. c. 66	Rivers (Prevention of Pollution) (Scotland) Act 1951	Section 36(3). Schedule 4.
15 & 16 Geo. 6 & 1 Eliz. 2. c. 12	Judicial Offices (Salaries, &c.) Act 1952	Section 6(2). The Schedule.
15 & 16 Geo. 6 & 1 Eliz. 2. c. 23	Miners' Welfare Act 1952	Sections 1(1) and 18(3). Schedule 2.
15 & 16 Geo. 6 & 1 Eliz. 2. c. 33	Finance Act 1952	In section 76, in subsection (8) paragraphs (a), (b) and (d) and in paragraph (c) the word " and ". Schedule 14 except Part V.
15 & 16 Geo. 6 & 1 Eliz. 2. c. 39	Motor Vehicles (International Circulation) Act 1952	Section 4(1). The Schedule.
15 & 16 Geo. 6 & 1 Eliz. 2. c. 44	Customs and Excise Act 1952	Sections 319 and 320. Schedules 11 and 12.
15 & 16 Geo. 6 & 1 Eliz. 2. c. 47	Rating and Valuation (Scotland) Act 1952	Section 8(3). Schedule 2.
15 & 16 Geo. 6 & 1 Eliz. 2. c. 48	Costs in Criminal Cases Act 1952	Section 18(1). The Schedule.
15 & 16 Geo. 6 & 1 Eliz. 2. c. 51	Isle of Man (Customs) Act 1952	Section 5(2).
15 & 16 Geo. 6 & 1 Eliz. 2. c. 52	Prison Act 1952	Section 54(2). Schedule 4.
15 & 16 Geo. 6 & 1 Eliz. 2. c. 55	Magistrates' Courts Act 1952	Section 132(1).
15 & 16 Geo. 6 & 1 Eliz. 2. c. 57	Marine and Aviation Insurance (War Risks) Act 1952	Section 11(3). The Schedule.
15 & 16 Geo. 6 & 1 Eliz. 2. c. 61	Prisons (Scotland) Act 1952	Section 43(2). Schedule 4.
15 & 16 Geo. 6 & 1 Eliz. 2. c. 66	Defamation Act 1952	Section 18(3).
15 & 16 Geo. 6 & 1 Eliz. 2. c. 67	Visiting Forces Act 1952	Section 18.
1 & 2 Eliz. 2. c. 15	Iron and Steel Act 1953	Section 36(2).
1 & 2 Eliz. 2. c. 20	Births and Deaths Registration Act 1953	Section 43(2). Schedule 2.
1 & 2 Eliz. 2. c. 34	Finance Act 1953	Section 35(7). Schedule 3.
1 & 2 Eliz. 2. c. 36	Post Office Act 1953	Section 91(1). Schedule 3.
1 & 2 Eliz. 2. c. 37	Registration Service Act 1953	Section 23(2). Schedule 2.
1 & 2 Eliz. 2. c. 50	Auxiliary Forces Act 1953	Section 44. Schedule 5.
2 & 3 Eliz. 2. c. 5	Statute Law Revision Act 1953	Schedules 1 to 3. In Schedule 4, the entry relating to section 22 of the Naval Volunteers Act 1853.
2 & 3 Eliz. 2. c. 30	Protection of Birds Act 1954	Section 15(2). Schedule 6.
2 & 3 Eliz. 2. c. 31	Coroners Act 1954	Section 1(2). The Schedule.
2 & 3 Eliz. 2. c. 34	Law Reform (Enforcement of Contracts) Act 1954	The whole act.
2 & 3 Eliz. 2. c. 36	Law Reform (Limitation of Actions, &c.) Act 1954	Sections 1, 5(2) and 8(3). The Schedule.
2 & 3 Eliz. 2. c. 38	Supreme Court Officers (Pensions) Act 1954	Section 6(2). The Schedule.
2 & 3 Eliz. 2. c. 42	Slaughterhouses Act 1954	Section 20(5). Schedule 2.
2 & 3 Eliz. 2. c. 44	Finance Act 1954	Section 35(9). Schedule 6.
2 & 3 Eliz. 2. c. 46	Protection of Animals (Anaesthetics) Act 1954	Section 2(4).
2 & 3 Eliz. 2. c. 56	Landlord and Tenant Act 1954	Sections 45 and 68(1). Schedule 7.
2 & 3 Eliz. 2. c. 57	Baking Industry (Hours of Work) Act 1954	Section 12(2). In section 12(3), the words from " Save " to " section ".
2 & 3 Eliz. 2. c. 59	Slaughter of Animals (Amendment) Act 1954	In section 11, in subsection (1), the words " Subject to the provisions of this section " and the words from " and the " onwards. In Schedule 2, Part II.
2 & 3 Eliz. 2. c. 60	Electricity Reorganisation (Scotland) Act 1954	Section 15(2). Schedule 2.
2 & 3 Eliz. 2. c. 61	Pharmacy Act 1954	Section 25(2). Schedule 4.
2 & 3 Eliz. 2. c. 64	Transport Charges &c. (Miscellaneous Provisions) Act 1954	Section 14(1). Schedule 2.
2 & 3 Eliz. 2. c. 65	National Gallery and Tate Gallery Act 1954	Sections 3(2), 6 and 8(2). Schedule 2.
2 & 3 Eliz. 2. c. 70	Mines and Quarries Act 1954	Section 189. Schedule 5.
3 & 4 Eliz. 2. c. 7	Fisheries Act 1955	Section 7(4). The Schedule.
3 & 4 Eliz. 2. c. 8	Northern Ireland Act 1955	Section 6(3). The Schedule.
3 & 4 Eliz. 2. c. 14	Imperial War Museum Act 1955	Section 2(5).
3 & 4 Eliz. 2. c. 20	Revision of the Army and Air Force Acts (Transitional Provisions) Act 1955	Section 5. Schedule 4.
4 & 5 Eliz. 2. c. 6	Miscellaneous Financial Provisions Act 1955	Section 1(4). In section 4, in subsection (4) the words from " and the " onwards. Section 5(15). Schedule 2.
4 & 5 Eliz. 2. c. 16	Food and Drugs Act 1955	Section 136(1). Schedule 11.
4 & 5 Eliz. 2. c. 30	Food and Drugs (Scotland) Act 1956	Section 60(2). Schedule 3.
4 & 5 Eliz. 2. c. 34	Criminal Justice Administration Act 1956	Section 21(3). Schedule 3.
4 & 5 Eliz. 2. c. 46	Administration of Justice Act 1956	In section 7(1), the words from the beginning to " but ". In section 55, in subsection (1) the words from " and the " onwards. Section 57(2). In Schedule 1, Part III. Schedule 2.
4 & 5 Eliz. 2. c. 52	Clean Air Act 1956	Section 35(1). Schedule 4.
4 & 5 Eliz. 2. c. 54	Finance Act 1956	Section 44(9). Schedule 5.
4 & 5 Eliz. 2. c. 60	Valuation and Rating (Scotland) Act 1956	Section 44. Schedule 7.
4 & 5 Eliz. 2. c. 69	Sexual Offences Act 1956	Section 51. Schedule 4.
4 & 5 Eliz. 2. c. 74	Copyright Act 1956	Section 50(2). Schedule 9.
4 & 5 Eliz. 2. c. 76	Medical Act 1956	Section 57(1). Schedule 5.
5 & 6 Eliz. 2. c. 11	Homicide Act 1957	Section 17(2). Schedule 2.
5 & 6 Eliz. 2. c. 15	Nurses Act 1957	Section 34(1). Schedule 5.
5 & 6 Eliz. 2. c. 16	Nurses Agencies Act 1957	Section 9(1). The Schedule.
5 & 6 Eliz. 2. c. 21	Cinematograph Films Act 1957	Section 17(5).
5 & 6 Eliz. 2. c. 28	Dentists Act 1957	Section 51(1). Schedule 2.
5 & 6 Eliz. 2. c. 32	Naval and Marine Reserves Pay Act 1957	Section 2(2). Schedule 2.
5 & 6 Eliz. 2. c. 36	Cheques Act 1957	Section 6(3). The Schedule.
5 & 6 Eliz. 2. c. 39	Legitimation (Re-registration of Birth) Act 1957	Section 1(2).
5 & 6 Eliz. 2. c. 42	Parish Councils Act 1957	Schedule 2.
5 & 6 Eliz. 2. c. 45	Exchequer and Audit Departments Act 1957	Section 3(2).
5 & 6 Eliz. 2. c. 46	Judicial Offices (Salaries and Pensions) Act 1957	Section 3(2). Schedule 2.
5 & 6 Eliz. 2. c. 48	Electricity Act 1957	Section 42(3). In section 43, in subsection (4) paragraph (b) and the word " and " immediately preceding that paragraph. Schedule 5.
5 & 6 Eliz. 2. c. 49	Finance Act 1957	Section 42(5). Schedule 9.
5 & 6 Eliz. 2. c. 53	Naval Discipline Act 1957	Section 137(1). Schedule 6.
5 & 6 Eliz. 2. c. 55	Affiliation Proceedings Act 1957	Section 12(1). The Schedule.
5 & 6 Eliz. 2. c. 60	Federation of Malaya Independence Act 1957	Section 4(2). Schedule 2.
6 & 7 Eliz. 2. c. 6	Import Duties Act 1958	Section 16(4). Schedule 7.
6 & 7 Eliz. 2. c. 11	Isle of Man Act 1958	Section 1(1) and (2). The Schedule.
6 & 7 Eliz. 2. c. 16	Commonwealth Institute Act 1958	Section 8(4). Schedule 3.
6 & 7 Eliz. 2. c. 24	Land Drainage (Scotland) Act 1958	Section 19(2).
6 & 7 Eliz. 2. c. 26	House of Commons (Redistribution of Seats) Act 1958	Section 7(2).
6 & 7 Eliz. 2. c. 28	Solicitors (Scotland) Act 1958	Section 18. Schedule 3.
6 & 7 Eliz. 2. c. 38	Defence Contracts Act 1958	Section 7(1).
6 & 7 Eliz. 2. c. 43	Horse Breeding Act 1958	Section 17(1).
6 & 7 Eliz. 2. c. 44	Dramatic and Musical Performers' Protection Act 1958	Section 9(3).
6 & 7 Eliz. 2. c. 45	Prevention of Fraud (Investments) Act 1958	Section 28(1). Schedule 2.
6 & 7 Eliz. 2. c. 46	Statute Law Revision Act 1958	Sections 1 to 3. Section 4(2). Schedules 1, 2 and 3.
6 & 7 Eliz. 2. c. 47	Agricultural Marketing Act 1958	Section 54(1). Schedule 4.
6 & 7 Eliz. 2. c. 51	Public Records Act 1958	Section 13(2). In Schedule 3, the entry relating to the Public Records (Scotland) Act 1937. Schedule 4.
6 & 7 Eliz. 2. c. 54	Divorce (Insanity and Desertion) Act 1958	Section 4(3).
6 & 7 Eliz. 2. c. 55	Local Government Act 1958	In section 56, in subsection (1), the words from the beginning to " but ". Section 58(2). In Schedule 8, paragraphs 6(1), 7(3), 10(2) and 11, in paragraph 12 the words from " and in subsection (3) " onwards, in paragraph 21 the words " paragraph (c) shall not have effect " and the words from " and the proviso " onwards, in paragraph 27 the words from " the proviso " to (where those words secondly occur) " effect and " and paragraph 29. Schedule 9.
6 & 7 Eliz. 2. c. 56	Finance Act 1958	Section 40(5). Schedule 9.
6 & 7 Eliz. 2. c. 58	Medical Act 1956 (Amendment) Act 1958	Sections 2, 3 and 4(2). The Schedule.
6 & 7 Eliz. 2. c. 60	Chequers Estate Act 1958	Section 3(7).
6 & 7 Eliz. 2. c. 62	Merchant Shipping (Liability of Shipowners and Others) Act 1958	Section 8(1) and (6). The Schedule.
6 & 7 Eliz. 2. c. 64	Local Government and Miscellaneous Financial Provisions (Scotland) Act 1958	Sections 10, 11 and 22. In Schedule 4, paragraphs 1, 2, 7 to 9, 11(1), 12, 13(1) and (2), 14, 15, 16(1) and 17. In Schedule 5, paragraphs 1, 8 to 11, 13 to 16, 19, 20 and 22 to 24. Schedule 6.
6 & 7 Eliz. 2. c. 72	Insurance Companies Act 1958	Section 36(2) and (3). In Schedule 5, Part II.
7 & 8 Eliz. 2. c. 1	Armed Forces (Housing Loans) Act 1958	Section 3(2).
7 & 8 Eliz. 2. c. 5	Adoption Act 1958	Section 59(2). Schedule 6.
7 & 8 Eliz. 2. c. 6	National Debt Act 1958	Section 17(1). The Schedule.
7 & 8 Eliz. 2. c. 7	Manoeuvres Act 1958	Section 10(2).
7 & 8 Eliz. 2. c. 8	Slaughter of Animals Act 1958	Section 12(1). Schedule 3.
7 & 8 Eliz. 2. c. 11	European Monetary Agreement Act 1959	Section 3(3). The Schedule.
7 & 8 Eliz. 2. c. 19	Emergency Laws (Repeal) Act 1959	In section 6, the words from " and section two " onwards. Section 10(3). Schedule 4.
7 & 8 Eliz. 2. c. 22	County Courts Act 1959	Section 204. Schedule 3.
7 & 8 Eliz. 2. c. 23	Overseas Resources Development Act 1959	Section 21(1). Schedule 2.
7 & 8 Eliz. 2. c. 24	Building (Scotland) Act 1959	Section 31(2). Schedule 10.
7 & 8 Eliz. 2. c. 25	Highways Act 1959	Sections 311 and 312(4). In Schedule 22, the entries relating to the Inclosure Act 1845, the Tramways Act 1870, the Evidence Act 1877, the Supreme Court of Judicature (Consolidation) Act 1925 and the Costs in Criminal Cases Act 1952. Also in Schedule 22, in the entry relating to the Annual Turnpike Acts Continuance Act 1872 the words from " and the words " onwards, in the entry relating to the Annual Turnpike Acts Continuance Act 1882 the words from " and the definition " onwards, in the entry relating to the Railway and Canal Traffic Act 1888 the words from " and subsection (3) " in paragraph 1 to the end of paragraph 2, in the entry relating to the Livestock Rearing Act 1951 the words from " and " in paragraph (b) to the end of paragraph (c). Schedules 23 and 25.
7 & 8 Eliz. 2. c. 40	Deer (Scotland) Act 1959	Section 36. Schedule 3.
7 & 8 Eliz. 2. c. 44	Fire Services Act 1959	Section 1. In section 5, the words from " and paragraphs (a) and (b) " onwards. In section 6, the words from " (which enables " to " omitted; and ". Section 14(4). The Schedule.
7 & 8 Eliz. 2. c. 45	Metropolitan Magistrates' Courts Act 1959	The Schedule.
7 & 8 Eliz. 2. c. 51	Licensing (Scotland) Act 1959	Section 200(1). Schedule 12.
7 & 8 Eliz. 2. c. 54	Weeds Act 1959	Section 10(1). The Schedule.
7 & 8 Eliz. 2. c. 55	Dog Licences Act 1959	Section 16(1). The Schedule.
7 & 8 Eliz. 2. c. 57	Street Offences Act 1959	Section 5(2). The Schedule.
7 & 8 Eliz. 2. c. 65	Fatal Accidents Act 1959	Section 3(3). The Schedule.
7 & 8 Eliz. 2. c. 68	Statute Law Revision Act 1959	The whole act.
7 & 8 Eliz. 2. c. 69	Wages Councils Act 1959	Schedule 6.
7 & 8 Eliz. 2. c. 71	Colonial Development and Welfare Act 1959	Section 10(1). The Schedule.
7 & 8 Eliz. 2. c. 72	Mental Health Act 1959	Section 149(2). Schedule 8.
8 & 9 Eliz. 2. c. 9	Judicial Pensions Act 1959	Section 9(2). Schedule 3.
8 & 9 Eliz. 2. c. 16	Road Traffic Act 1960	Section 267(1). Schedule 18.
8 & 9 Eliz. 2. c. 19	European Free Trade Association Act 1960	Section 5.
8 & 9 Eliz. 2. c. 29	Marriage (Enabling) Act 1960	Section 1(4). The Schedule.
8 & 9 Eliz. 2. c. 44	Finance Act 1960	Schedule 8.
8 & 9 Eliz. 2. c. 46	Corporate Bodies' Contracts Act 1960	Section 4(2). The Schedule.
8 & 9 Eliz. 2. c. 48	Matrimonial Proceedings (Magistrates' Courts) Act 1960	In section 18, in subsection (1), the words from the beginning to " Provided that ". The Schedule.
8 & 9 Eliz. 2. c. 56	Statute Law Revision Act 1960	Section 1(1). The Schedule.
8 & 9 Eliz. 2. c. 62	Caravan Sites and Control of Development Act 1960	Section 48. Schedule 4.
8 & 9 Eliz. 2. c. 65	Administration of Justice Act 1960	Section 19(2). Schedule 4.
9 & 10 Eliz. 2. c. 3	Administration of Justice (Judges and Pensions) Act 1960	In section 6, in subsection (1), the words from " and the enactments " onwards. In Schedule 2, Part II.
9 & 10 Eliz. 2. c. 6	Ministers of the Crown (Parliamentary Secretaries) Act 1960	Section 4(2). Schedule 2.
9 & 10 Eliz. 2. c. 14	Nurses (Amendment) Act 1961	Section 14(2). Schedule 2.
9 & 10 Eliz. 2. c. 27	Carriage by Air Act 1961	Schedule 2.
9 & 10 Eliz. 2. c. 33	Land Compensation Act 1961	Section 40(3). Schedule 5.
9 & 10 Eliz. 2. c. 34	Factories Act 1961	Section 183(2). In section 185(3), the words from " and so " to " subsections ". Schedule 7.
9 & 10 Eliz. 2. c. 36	Finance Act 1961	Section 37(6). Schedule 6.
9 & 10 Eliz. 2. c. 37	Small Estates (Representation) Act 1961	Section 3(4). Schedule 2.
9 & 10 Eliz. 2. c. 39	Criminal Justice Act 1961	Sections 21 and 41(2). Schedule 5.
9 & 10 Eliz. 2. c. 42	Sheriffs' Pensions (Scotland) Act 1961	Sections 1(2) and 8(2). Schedule 2.
9 & 10 Eliz. 2. c. 48	Land Drainage Act 1961	Sections 44 and 54(2). In Schedule 1, paragraphs 1, 9, 15 and 16. Schedule 2.
9 & 10 Eliz. 2. c. 50	Rivers (Prevention of Pollution) Act 1961	Sections 4(2), 8(2) and 15(4). Schedule 2.
9 & 10 Eliz. 2. c. 52	Army and Air Force Act 1961	In section 29, in subsection (2), in paragraph (a), the words from the beginning to " omitted; and " and paragraph (b). In Schedule 2, the entries relating to Schedule 3 to the Army Act 1955 and to Schedules 3 and 6 to the Air Force Act 1955.
9 & 10 Eliz. 2. c. 54	Human Tissue Act 1961	Section 4(2).
9 & 10 Eliz. 2. c. 60	Suicide Act 1961	Section 3(2). Schedule 2.
9 & 10 Eliz. 2. c. 62	Trustee Investments Act 1961	Section 16(2). Schedule 5.
9 & 10 Eliz. 2. c. 63	Highways (Miscellaneous Provisions) Act 1961	In section 1(6), the words from the beginning to the word " and " which immediately follows paragraph (c). Section 12.
9 & 10 Eliz. 2. c. 64	Public Health Act 1961	Sections 6(8) and 10(1), (3) and (6). In section 24, in subsection (1) the words from " and accordingly " onwards, and subsection (2). Sections 25(10), 58, 79 and 86(3). Schedule 5.
10 & 11 Eliz. 2. c. 9	Local Government (Financial Provisions etc.) (Scotland) Act 1962	Sections 5(1) and 12(2). Schedule 3.
10 & 11 Eliz. 2. c. 12	Education Act 1962	Section 13(1). Schedule 2.
10 & 11 Eliz. 2. c. 15	Criminal Justice Administration Act 1962	Section 20(2). Schedule 5.
10 & 11 Eliz. 2. c. 19	West Indies Act 1962	The Schedule.
10 & 11 Eliz. 2. c. 23	South Africa Act 1962	Section 1(1). In section 2, in subsection (3), the words from " and the " onwards. Schedule 5.
10 & 11 Eliz. 2. c. 28	Housing (Scotland) Act 1962	Section 35(2). Schedule 5.
10 & 11 Eliz. 2. c. 31	Sea Fish Industry Act 1962	Section 37. Schedule 4.
10 & 11 Eliz. 2. c. 37	Building Societies Act 1962	Section 131. Schedule 10.
10 & 11 Eliz. 2. c. 47	Education (Scotland) Act 1962	In section 147, the words from the beginning to " Provided that ". Schedule 8.
10 & 11 Eliz. 2. c. 48	Law Reform (Husband and Wife) Act 1962	Section 3(2). The Schedule.
10 & 11 Eliz. 2. c. 50	Landlord and Tenant Act 1962	Section 7(4). The Schedule.
10 & 11 Eliz. 2. c. 51	Licensing (Scotland) Act 1962	Section 26(2). In Schedule 2, in paragraph 19 sub-paragraph (b) and the word " and " immediately preceding that sub-paragraph, paragraph 20, in paragraph 22 sub-paragraph (b), paragraph 25, in paragraph 29 the words from " and the words " onwards, in paragraph 31 the words from " and the words " onwards, in paragraph 35 in sub-paragraph (a) the words from " the definitions of " to " omitted ", and in paragraph 36 sub-paragraphs (c), (e) and (f). Schedule 3.
10 & 11 Eliz. 2. c. 53	House of Commons Members' Fund Act 1962	Section 2(4). The Schedule.
1963 c. 2	Betting, Gaming and Lotteries Act 1963	Section 57(1). Schedule 8.
1963 c. 3	Betting Duties Act 1963	Section 6(1). Schedule 3.
1963 c. 6	Commonwealth Scholarships (Amendment) Act 1963	Section 2.
1963 c. 9	Purchase Tax Act 1963	Section 41(1). Schedule 4.
1963 c. 12	Local Government (Financial Provisions) (Scotland) Act 1963	In section 18, the words from " and the said " onwards. Section 27. Schedule 3.
1963 c. 24	British Museum Act 1963	Section 13(5). Schedule 4.
1963 c. 29	Local Authorities (Land) Act 1963	Section 8. The Schedule.
1963 c. 30	Statute Law Revision Act 1963	The whole act.
1963 c. 31	Weights and Measures Act 1963	Section 61. In section 63, in subsection (1) the words from the beginning to the word " and " where it first occurs after paragraph (b), and in subsection (2) the words from the beginning to the word " and " which immediately follows paragraph (b). Schedule 9. In Schedule 10, Part V.
1963 c. 33	London Government Act 1963	Section 93(1). In Schedule 6, paragraph 67. In Schedule 17, paragraph 29. Schedule 18.
1963 c. 35	Malaysia Act 1963	Section 6(2). Schedule 3.
1963 c. 37	Children and Young Persons Act 1963	Sections 21 and 64(3). In Schedule 3, paragraphs 1, 2, 3, 8 and 12, in paragraph 13 the words from " and the words " onwards, and paragraph 39. Schedule 5.
1963 c. 43	Animal Boarding Establishments Act 1963	Section 7(2).
1963 c. 46	Local Government (Financial Provisions) Act 1963	Section 16. Schedule 2.
1963 c. 48	Peerage Act 1963	Section 7(2). Schedule 2.
1963 c. 51	Land Compensation (Scotland) Act 1963	Section 47(3). Schedule 4.
1963 c. 55	Zanzibar Act 1963	Section 6(3). Schedule 3.
1963 c. 59	Electricity and Gas Act 1963	Schedule 2.
1964 c. 12	Episcopal Church (Scotland) Act 1964	Section 1(2).
1964 c. 15	Defence (Transfer of Functions) Act 1964	Section 1(8).
1964 c. 25	War Damage Act 1964	Section 12. Schedule 3.
1964 c. 26	Licensing Act 1964	Section 203(1) and (3). Schedule 15.
1964 c. 27	Salmon and Freshwater Fisheries Act 1923 (Amendment) Act 1964	The whole act.
1964 c. 28	Agriculture and Horticulture Act 1964	Section 7(3).
1964 c. 29	Continental Shelf Act 1964	Section 8(2).
1964 c. 33	Burgh Police (Amendment) (Scotland) Act 1964	In section 1, the words from " and accordingly " onwards.
1964 c. 34	Criminal Procedure (Right of Reply) Act 1964	Section 1(2).
1964 c. 39	Protection of Animals (Anaesthetics) Act 1964	Section 1(2).
1964 c. 40	Harbours Act 1964	In section 29, in subsection (1), the words from the beginning to " effect, and " and the word " other ". In section 38, in subsection (1), paragraph (a) and in paragraph (c) the words from the beginning to " Act and ", and subsection (3). Section 39(5). Section 63(3). Schedule 6.
1964 c. 41	Succession (Scotland) Act 1964	Section 34(2). In Schedule 2, in paragraph 13, sub-paragraph (a). Schedule 3.
1964 c. 42	Administration of Justice Act 1964	Section 40(1). Section 41(8). In Schedule 3, paragraphs 9, 19(3), 20(5) and 23(2). Schedule 5.
1964 c. 47	Merchant Shipping Act 1964	In section 9, paragraph (a). Section 18(4).
1964 c. 48	Police Act 1964	Section 64(3). In Schedule 9, the entries relating to section 9 of the Metropolitan Police Act 1839 and the Metropolitan Police Staff (Superannuation) Act 1875, in the entry relating to section 5 of the Riot (Damages) Act 1886 the words from " and the words " to the word " omitted " where it first occurs thereafter and the words " and subsection (4) shall be omitted ", and the entry relating to the Betting, Gaming and Lotteries Act 1963. Schedule 10.
1964 c. 49	Finance Act 1964	In Schedule 8, paragraphs 2, 8 and 10. Schedule 9 except paragraphs 1 to 4 at the end of that Schedule.
1964 c. 50	Tenancy of Shops (Scotland) Act 1964	The whole act.
1964 c. 51	Universities and College Estates Act 1964	Section 4(2). In Schedule 3, in Part I, in the entry relating to section 10 of the Kendal Corn Rent Act 1932 the words from " and in subsections (3) and (4) " onwards and in the entry relating to section 11 of that Act the words from " and the words " onwards, and in Part II the entry relating to Schedule 1 to the Universities and College Estates Act 1925. Schedule 4.
1964 c. 57	Adoption Act 1964	Section 2(2).
1964 c. 60	Emergency Laws (Re-enactments and Repeals) Act 1964	Schedule 2.
1964 c. 65	Zambia Independence Act 1964	Section 11(3). Schedule 3.
1964 c. 72	Fishery Limits Act 1964	Section 3(4). In Schedule 1, the entries relating to the Sea Fisheries (Scotland) Amendment Act 1885, the Fisheries Act 1891 and the Sea Fish Industry Act 1962. Schedule 2.
1964 c. 75	Public Libraries and Museums Act 1964	Section 26(2). Schedule 3.
1964 c. 79	Statute Law Revision Act 1964	The whole act.
1964 c. 80	Statute Law Revision (Scotland) Act 1964	Section 1. Schedule 1.
1964 c. 81	Diplomatic Privileges Act 1964	Section 8(4). Schedule 2.
1964 c. 84	Criminal Procedure (Insanity) Act 1964	Section 8(5). In Schedule 2, in Part I, in the entry relating to section 116(1), the words from " The words " to " omitted, and ", the entry specifying the omissions to be made from section 116(5) and, in Part II, in the entry relating to section 63(1) the words from " (a) " to " omitted, and ".
1964 c. 86	Malta Independence Act 1964	Section 4(6). Schedule 3.
1964 c. 92	Finance (No. 2) Act 1964	Section 10(4). Schedule 4.
1964 c. 95	Travel Concessions Act 1964	Section 1(2).
1964 c. 98	Ministers of the Crown Act 1964	Section 5(4). In Schedule 2, in Part I, in the entry relating to section 2 of the House of Commons Disqualification Act 1957, the words from " and the words from " onwards, and, in the entry relating to Schedule 2 to that Act, the words from " the words ' Part I ' " to " omitted " where it first occurs thereafter and the words from " the entry relating to the Economic Secretary " to " omitted ". Schedule 3.
1965 c. 2	Administration of Justice Act 1965	Sections 22(4), 34(1) and 36(4). In Schedule 1, in the entry relating to the Court Funds Act 1829, the words from " and the words " onwards, in the entry relating to the Ecclesiastical Houses of Residence Act 1842, the words from " and the words " onwards, and in the entry relating to section 80 of the Lands Clauses Consolidation Act 1845, the words from " the words ' in ' " to " omitted ". Schedules 2 and 3.
1965 c. 4	Science and Technology Act 1965	In Schedule 2, the entry relating to sections 3 and 4 of the Geological Survey Act 1845 and in the entry relating to section 6 of that Act the words from " and the words " onwards. Schedule 4, except the entry relating to the Atomic Energy Authority Act 1959.
1965 c. 9	Armed Forces (Housing Loans) Act 1965	In section 1(5)(b) the words from " and the following " onwards. In the Schedule, in Part I, paragraphs 2(c) and 3.
1965 c. 11	Ministerial Salaries and Members' Pensions Act 1965	Section 20 (2) and (3). Schedule 5.
1965 c. 12	Industrial and Provident Societies Act 1965	Section 77(1). Schedule 5.
1965 c. 13	Rivers (Prevention of Pollution) (Scotland) Act 1965	Sections 4(2), 9(2) and 17(6). In Schedule 3, the entries relating to sections 22(5) and (7), 24, and 28(1), (3), (5), (6), (10), (11) and (13) of the Rivers (Prevention of Pollution) (Scotland) Act 1951. Schedule 4.
1965 c. 26	Criminal Justice Act 1965	Section 2(4).
1965 c. 32	Administration of Estates (Small Payments) Act 1965	In Schedule 3, in the entry relating to the Loan Societies Act 1840 the words from " the words ' under ' " to " omitted; ", in each of the entries relating respectively to the Great Western Railway Act 1885, the Taff Vale Railway Act 1895, the Friendly Societies Act 1896, the London Midland and Scottish Railway Act 1924 and the Southern Railway Act 1924 the words " the words ' intestate and ' shall be omitted, and ", the entries relating to section 46(1) and (4) of the Building Societies Act 1962 and in the entry relating to section 46(2) of that Act the words from " and the words " onwards, and in the entry relating to the Industrial and Provident Societies Act 1965 the words from " the word ' intestate ' " to " omitted, and ". Schedule 4.
1965 c. 38	Overseas Development and Service Act 1965	Section 3(3). The Schedule.
1965 c. 39	Criminal Procedure (Scotland) Act 1965	Section 1(4).
1965 c. 43	Statutory Orders (Special Procedure) Act 1965	Section 1(3). In section 1(4) the words from " and the proviso " onwards. Section 2(4). The Schedule.
1965 c. 47	Merchant Shipping Act 1965	Section 7(2). In Schedule 1, the entry relating to section 371 of the Merchant Shipping Act 1894. Schedule 2.
1965 c. 49	Registration of Births, Deaths and Marriages (Scotland) Act 1965	Section 58(2). Schedule 2.
1965 c. 55	Statute Law Revision (Consequential Repeals) Act 1965	Section 1(1). The Schedule.
1965 c. 57	Nuclear Installations Act 1965	Section 29(1).
1965 c. 59	New Towns Act 1965	Section 56(3). Schedule 12.
1965 c. 69	Criminal Procedure (Attendance of Witnesses) Act 1965	Sections 1(4) and 7(2). In section 10, subsection (2), and in subsection (3) the words from " and the enactments mentioned " onwards. In Schedule 2, Part II.
1965 c. 71	Murder (Abolition of Death Penalty) Act 1965	Section 3(2). The Schedule.
1965 c. 82	Coal Industry Act 1965	Section 5(3). Schedule 2.
1966 c. 4	Mines (Working Facilities and Support) Act 1966	Schedule 1.
1966 c. 5	Statute Law Revision Act 1966	The whole act.
1966 c. 13	Universities (Scotland) Act 1966	Section 14. Schedule 7.
1966 c. 19	Law Reform (Miscellaneous Provisions) (Scotland) Act 1966	Section 11(2). The Schedule.
1966 c. 20	Ministry of Social Security Act 1966	Section 39(3). Schedule 8.
1966 c. 21	Overseas Aid Act 1966	Section 6(1).
1966 c. 30	Reserve Forces Act 1966	Section 23(7). Schedule 2.
1966 c. 31	Criminal Appeal Act 1966	Section 10(2). Schedule 3.
1966 c. 34	Industrial Development Act 1966	In section 31, in subsection (4), the words from " and the enactments " onwards. In Schedule 3, in Part II, the entry relating to the House of Commons Disqualification Act 1957, and Part IV.
1966 c. 35	Family Provision Act 1966	In section 10, in subsection (2), the words from the beginning to " Act; and ". Schedule 2.
1966 c. 38	Sea Fisheries Regulation Act 1966	Section 21(1). The Schedule.
1966 c. 39	Land Registration Act 1966	Sections 1(1) and 2(3). The Schedule.
1966 c. 42	Local Government Act 1966	Sections 35(1) and 43(2). In Schedule 3, Part I. Schedule 6.
1966 c. 44	New Towns Act 1966	Section 3.
1966 c. 45	Armed Forces Act 1966	Section 11. In section 19, the words from " and section 219 " onwards. Sections 20(4)(b), 34 and 37(2). Schedule 2. In Schedule 3, in paragraph 2, the words from " and accordingly " to " effect ". In Schedule 4, the entries relating to section 59 of the Army Act 1955, section 59 of the Air Force Act 1955, and sections 123(2) and 126(3) of and Schedule 2 to the Naval Discipline Act 1957. Schedule 5.
1966 c. 51	Local Government (Scotland) Act 1966	Sections 42(1) and 48(2). In Schedule 4, Part I. Schedule 6.

== Subsequent developments ==
In section 3(2), the words "or the Isle of Man" of, and the schedule, except parts III, VI and VII and the savings specified at the end of those parts, to, the act were repealed by group 2 of part IX of schedule 1 to the Statute Law (Repeals) Act 1998, which came into force on 19 November 1998. The orders in council made under section 3(2) of the act have lapsed because of the repeal made to that section by the 1998 act

== See also ==
- Statute Law (Repeals) Act

== Bibliography ==
- Halsbury's Statutes. Fourth Edition. 2008 Reissue. Volume 41. Page 785.
- The Public General Acts and General Synod Measures 1974. HMSO. London. 1975. Part I.
- HL Deb vol 350, cols 522 and 1032 to 1035, vol 352, col 738.
