= Commonwealth Development Corporation Act 1978 =

Act of the Parliament of the United Kingdom

Commonwealth Development Corporation Act 1978 (Note: Section 19(1).)
- Act of Parliament
- Parliament of the United Kingdom
- Long title: An Act to consolidate the enactments relating to the Commonwealth Development Corporation with corrections and minor improvements made under the Consolidation of Enactments (Procedure) Act 1949.
- Citation: 1978 c. 2
- Territorial extent: United Kingdom (Note: Section 19(3).)

Dates
- Royal assent: 23 March 1978
- Commencement: 23 April 1978 (Note: Section 19(2).)
Other legislation
Amends	See § Repealed enactments
Repeals/revokes	See § Repealed enactments
Amended by	Commonwealth Development Corporation Act 1999

Status: Partially repealed

Text of statute as originally enacted

Revised text of statute as amended

Text of the Commonwealth Development Corporation Act 1978 as in force today (including any amendments) within the United Kingdom, from legislation.gov.uk.

The Commonwealth Development Corporation Act 1978 (c. 2) is an act of the Parliament of the United Kingdom that consolidated enactments relating to the Commonwealth Development Corporation, a statutory body established to assist the development of economies in overseas countries.

== Provisions ==
=== Repealed enactments ===
Section 18(1) of the act repealed 7 enactments, listed in schedule 2 to the act.

Citation	Short title	Extent of repeal
7 & 8 Eliz. 2. c. 23	Overseas Resources Development Act 1959	The whole act.
1963 c. 40	Commonwealth Development Act 1963	The whole act.
1966 c. 21	Overseas Aid Act 1966	Section 4.
1968 c. 13	National Loans Act 1968	Section 10(3).
1969 c. 36	Overseas Resources Development Act 1969	The whole act.
1975 c. 26	Ministers of the Crown Act 1975	In Part I of Schedule 2, the entries relating to the Overseas Resources Development Act 1959 and the Overseas Resources Development Act 1969.
1977 c. 6	International Finance, Trade and Aid Act 1977	Sections 5 and 6.

== Subsequent developments ==
Sections 1(2)–(4) and 2–18 of, and schedule 1 to, the act were repealed by section 27 of, and schedule 4 to, the Commonwealth Development Corporation Act 1999, which came into force on 8 December 1999, when the Commonwealth Development Corporation was registered as a company under the Companies Act 1985.
