= List of acts of the Parliament of the United Kingdom from 1963 =

This is a list of acts of the Parliament of the United Kingdom passed in 1963.

Acts passed since 1963 are cited by calendar year, as opposed to the convention used for earlier acts of citing the regnal year(s) in which the relevant parliamentary session was held. Each act passed in a respective year is given a chapter number (abbreviated "c."), denoted by Arabic numerals in the case of public general acts, lowercase Roman numerals in the case of local acts, or italicised Arabic numerals in the case of personal acts. These run as separate series.

98 acts of Parliament were passed in 1963: 59 public general acts, 38 local acts and 1 personal act.

indicates that an act has been transcribed on Wikisource, indicates that an act is available to view at legislation.gov.uk, and indicates the location of the original act in the Parliamentary Archives.

== Public general acts ==
| Short title | Citation | Royal assent |
Long title
| Consolidated Fund Act 1963 (repealed) | 1963 c. 1 | 28 February 1963 |
An Act to apply a sum out of the Consolidated Fund to the service of the year ending on 31st March 1963. (Repealed by Statute Law (Repeals) Act 1971 (c. 52))
| Betting, Gaming and Lotteries Act 1963 (repealed) | 1963 c. 2 | 28 February 1963 |
An Act to consolidate certain enactments relating to betting, gaming, lotteries and connected matters. (Repealed by Gambling Act 2005 (c. 19))
| Betting Duties Act 1963 (repealed) | 1963 c. 3 | 28 February 1963 |
An Act to consolidate certain enactments relating to the pool betting and bookmakers' licence duties. (Repealed by Betting and Gaming Duties Act 1972 (c. 25))
| Towyn Trewan Common Act 1963 | 1963 c. 4 | 28 February 1963 |
An Act to extinguish certain rights of common, private rights of way and other rights in respect of lands forming part of Towyn Trewan Common in the county of Anglesey, and to enable certain works to be carried out on other lands forming part of the Common; to provide for compensation in respect of the extinguishment of, or interference with, the said rights of common and private rights of way; to provide for the use by the public of a track across part of the Common; to extend the powers of the Conservators of the Common; and for purposes connected with the matters aforesaid.
| County Courts (Jurisdiction) Act 1963 (repealed) | 1963 c. 5 | 28 February 1963 |
An Act to increase the amounts by reference to which jurisdiction conferred on county courts by the County Courts Act 1959 (Note: County Courts Act 1959 (7 & 8 Eliz. 2. c. 22)) is limited, and a right of appeal from such courts on questions of fact is by that Act conferred, in certain proceedings in which land is concerned, and make to that Act amendments consequential on the increase; to amend the provisions of that Act with respect to the construction of references to net annual value for rating; and to increase the amount by reference to which is determined the question whether the High Court or a county court has jurisdiction to entertain proceedings under certain other enactments. (Repealed by Administration of Justice Act 1973 (c. 15))
| Commonwealth Scholarships (Amendment) Act 1963 (repealed) | 1963 c. 6 | 28 February 1963 |
An Act to amend the Commonwealth Scholarships Act 1959. (Note: Commonwealth Scholarships Act 1959 (8 & 9 Eliz. 2. c. 6)) (Repealed by Overseas Development and Co-operation Act 1980 (c. 63))
| National Insurance Act 1963 (repealed) | 1963 c. 7 | 28 February 1963 |
An Act to increase ungraduated contributions and benefits under the National Insurance Acts 1946 to 1961, and contributions and benefits under the National Insurance (Industrial Injuries) Acts 1946 to 1961, to modify, in connection with the increase of any such benefits, the method of computing national assistance grants for any period before all the increases have taken effect, to modify the widowed mother's allowance under the National Insurance Act 1946, (Note: National Insurance Act 1946 (9 & 10 Geo. 6. c. 67)) to amend section 24 (1) of the National Insurance Act 1946 as respects conditions for payment of benefit under that section, to alter graduated contributions and benefits under the National Insurance Act 1959 (Note: National Insurance Act 1959 (7 & 8 Eliz. 2. c. 47)) by enlarging the amount of pay taken into account in fixing contributions, to amend that Act of 1959 as respects nonparticipating employments and to improve the allowances payable out of the Industrial Injuries Fund in respect of incapacities arising from pre-1948 employment; and for purposes connected with the matters aforesaid. (Repealed by Statute Law Revision (Consequential Repeals) Act 1965 (c. 55) and Workmen's Compensation and Benefit (Amendment) Act 1965 (c. 79))
| Consolidated Fund (No. 2) Act 1963 (repealed) | 1963 c. 8 | 28 March 1963 |
An Act to apply certain sums out of the Consolidated Fund to the service of the years ending on 31st March 1962, 1963 and 1964. (Repealed by Statute Law (Repeals) Act 1971 (c. 52))
| Purchase Tax Act 1963 (repealed) | 1963 c. 9 | 28 March 1963 |
An Act to consolidate the enactments relating to purchase tax. (Repealed by Finance Act 1972 (c. 41))
| Drainage Rates Act 1963 (repealed) | 1963 c. 10 | 28 March 1963 |
An Act to provide for the assessment of drainage rates by reference to values determined under section 8 of the Agriculture (Miscellaneous Provisions) Act 1943, (Note: Agriculture (Miscellaneous Provisions) Act 1943 (6 & 7 Geo. 6. c. 16)) notwithstanding the repeal of that section. (Repealed by Land Drainage Act 1976 (c. 70))
| Agriculture (Miscellaneous Provisions) Act 1963 | 1963 c. 11 | 15 May 1963 |
An Act to make further provision as to grants and contributions for agricultural and certain horticultural purposes and otherwise to amend the law relating to agriculture, agricultural produce and agricultural land; to provide for the purchase by the Sugar Board of sugar from the Republic of Ireland; to make new provision as to the charging of certain fees; and for purposes connected with those matters.
| Local Government (Financial Provisions) (Scotland) Act 1963 | 1963 c. 12 | 15 May 1963 |
An Act to continue, with amendments, the provisions relating to the payment of Exchequer Equalisation and Transitional Grants to local authorities in Scotland; to increase the limit of contributions payable to such authorities under the Rural Water Supplies and Sewerage Act 1944; (Note: Rural Water Supplies and Sewerage Act 1944 (7 & 8 Geo. 6. c. 26)) to alter the basis of apportionment among such authorities of certain sums (including the aggregate amount of the General Grants payable under the Local Government and Miscellaneous Financial Provisions (Scotland) Act 1958); (Note: Local Government and Miscellaneous Financial Provisions (Scotland) Act 1958 (6 & 7 Eliz. 2. c. 64)) and to amend the law of Scotland with respect to the valuation for rating of industrial and freight transport lands and heritages and to other matters relating to valuation, rating, and local authorities' financial administration; and for purposes connected with the matters aforesaid.
| Nursing Homes Act 1963 (repealed) | 1963 c. 13 | 15 May 1963 |
An Act to authorise the Minister of Health to make regulations as to the conduct of nursing homes; and to repeal section 192 of the Public Health Act 1936 (Note: Public Health Act 1936 (26 Geo. 5 & 1 Edw. 8. c. 49)) and section 246 of the Public Health (London) Act 1936. (Note: Public Health (London) Act 1936 (26 Geo. 5 & 1 Edw. 8. c. 50)) (Repealed by Nursing Homes Act 1975 (c. 37))
| Corn Rents Act 1963 | 1963 c. 14 | 15 May 1963 |
An Act to make further provision for the apportionment and redemption of corn rents and other payments wholly or partly payable in lieu of tithes and for the extinguishment thereof in certain cases; to transfer to the Treasury the functions of the Minister of Agriculture, Fisheries and Food under subsection (2) of section 30 of the Tithe Act 1936; (Note: Tithe Act 1936 (26 Geo. 5 & 1 Edw. 8. c. 43)) and for purposes connected with the matters aforesaid.
| Fort William Pulp and Paper Mills Act 1963 (repealed) | 1963 c. 15 | 15 May 1963 |
An Act to authorise the Board of Trade to make advances to Wiggins, Teape & Co. Limited in connection with the construction and equipment of pulp and paper mills in the neighbourhood of Fort William, and to make grants to that company in respect of interest on such advances. (Repealed by Statute Law (Repeals) Act 2004 (c. 14))
| Protection of Depositors Act 1963 (repealed) | 1963 c. 16 | 10 July 1963 |
An Act to penalise fraudulent inducements to invest on deposit; to restrict and regulate the issue of advertisements for deposits; to make special provision with respect to the accounts to be delivered by and the supervision of companies which issue such advertisements; to amend section 13 of the Prevention of Fraud (Investments) Act 1958; (Note: Prevention of Fraud (Investments) Act 1958 (6 & 7 Eliz. 2. c. 45)) and for purposes connected with the matters aforesaid. (Repealed by Banking Act 1979 (c. 37))
| Town and Country Planning Act 1963 (repealed) | 1963 c. 17 | 10 July 1963 |
An Act to make further provision with respect to development comprised in Schedule 3 to the Town and Country Planning Act 1962 (Note: Town and Country Planning Act 1962 (10 & 11 Eliz. 2. c. 38)) and Schedule 3 to the Town and Country Planning (Scotland) Act 1947. (Note: Town and Country Planning (Scotland) Act 1947 (10 & 11 Geo. 6. c. 53)) (Repealed for England and Wales by Town and Country Planning Act 1971 (c. 78) and for Scotland by Town and Country Planning (Scotland) Act 1972 (c. 52))
| Stock Transfer Act 1963 | 1963 c. 18 | 10 July 1963 |
An Act to amend the law with respect to the transfer of securities.
| Local Employment Act 1963 (repealed) | 1963 c. 19 | 10 July 1963 |
An Act to make further provision for the payment of grants under the Local Employment Act 1960 (Note: Local Employment Act 1960 (8 & 9 Eliz. 2. c. 18)) towards the cost of machinery, plant and buildings required by undertakings in development districts, and to enable the Board to fulfil certain agreements in localities which have ceased to be development districts. (Repealed by Statute Law (Repeals) Act 1978 (c. 45))
| Remuneration of Teachers Act 1963 (repealed) | 1963 c. 20 | 10 July 1963 |
An Act to empower the Minister of Education to make provision by order (otherwise than in accordance with section 89 of the Education Act 1944) (Note: Education Act 1944 (7 & 8 Geo. 6. c. 31)) with respect to the remuneration of teachers; and for purposes connected therewith. (Repealed by Remuneration of Teachers Act 1965 (c. 3))
| Education (Scotland) Act 1963 (repealed) | 1963 c. 21 | 10 July 1963 |
An Act to provide for the establishment of a board in Scotland for the purpose of discharging certain functions relating to examinations for pupils receiving secondary education and others; to amend the provisions of the Education (Scotland) Act 1962 (Note: Education (Scotland) Act 1962 (10 & 11 Eliz. 2. c. 47)) with respect to the scope of regulations prescribing scales of salary for teachers and to the provision of pensions for widows, widowers, children and dependants of teachers; to amend certain provisions of the Local Government (Scotland) Act 1947 (Note: Local Government (Scotland) Act 1947 (10 & 11 Geo. 6. c. 43)) relating to membership of education committees and of sub-committees thereof; and for purposes connected with the matters aforesaid. (Repealed by Education (Scotland) Act 1980 (c. 44))
| Sheriff Courts (Civil Jurisdiction and Procedure) (Scotland) Act 1963 | 1963 c. 22 | 10 July 1963 |
An Act to increase the amount by reference to which actions are classified as summary causes in the sheriff court in Scotland; to increase the amount by reference to which the small debt jurisdiction of the sheriff is limited; to amend the law with regard to the bringing of actions between spouses for interim aliment of small amounts in the sheriff's small debt court and with regard to the jurisdiction of the sheriff in such actions brought as aforesaid; and for purposes connected with the matters aforesaid.
| Forestry (Sale of Land) (Scotland) Act 1963 (repealed) | 1963 c. 23 | 10 July 1963 |
An Act to extend the power conferred on the Secretary of State by paragraph (c) of subsection (7) of section 4 of the Forestry Act 1945 (Note: Forestry Act 1945 (8 & 9 Geo. 6. c. 35)) to sell land vested in or acquired by him by or under the said section 4. (Repealed by Forestry Act 1967 (c. 10))
| British Museum Act 1963 | 1963 c. 24 | 10 July 1963 |
An Act to alter the composition of the Trustees of the British Museum, to provide for the separation from the British Museum of the British Museum (Natural History), to make new provision with respect to the regulation of the two Museums and their collections in place of that made by the British Museum Act 1753 (Note: British Museum Act 1753 (26 Geo. 2. c. 22)) and enactments amending or supplementing that Act, and for purposes connected with the matters aforesaid.
| Finance Act 1963 | 1963 c. 25 | 31 July 1963 |
An Act to grant certain duties, to alter other duties, and to amend the law relating to the National Debt and the Public Revenue, and to make further provision in connection with Finance.
| Appropriation Act 1963 (repealed) | 1963 c. 26 | 31 July 1963 |
An Act to apply a sum out of the Consolidated Fund to the service of the year ending on 31st March 1964, and to appropriate the supplies granted in this Session of Parliament. (Repealed by Statute Law (Repeals) Act 1971 (c. 52))
| Oaths and Evidence (Overseas Authorities and Countries) Act 1963 | 1963 c. 27 | 31 July 1963 |
An Act to authorise the administration of oaths and the performance of notarial acts by representatives of, and other persons empowered by the authorities of, countries overseas, and by representatives of Her Majesty in post overseas; and to amend the Foreign Tribunals Evidence Act 1856 (Note: Foreign Tribunals Evidence Act 1856 (19 & 20 Vict. c. 113)) and the Evidence (Foreign, Dominion and Colonial Documents) Act 1933. (Note: Evidence (Foreign, Dominion and Colonial Documents) Act 1933 (23 & 24 Geo. 5. c. 4))
| Oil in Navigable Waters Act 1963 (repealed) | 1963 c. 28 | 31 July 1963 |
An Act to enable effect to be given to certain amendments of the International Convention for the Prevention of Pollution of the Sea by Oil 1954, (Note: International Convention for the Prevention of Pollution of the Sea by Oil) and otherwise to extend the Oil in Navigable Waters Act 1955. (Note: Oil in Navigable Waters Act 1955 (3 & 4 Eliz. 2. c. 25)) (Repealed by Prevention of Oil Pollution Act 1971 (c. 60))
| Local Authorities (Land) Act 1963 | 1963 c. 29 | 31 July 1963 |
An Act to make amendments of the law relating to the functions of local authorities in relation to land to the like effect as those commonly made in local Acts; to enable local authorities to make advances for the erection of buildings and to provide accommodation for keeping motor vehicles; to amend the provisions of the National Parks and Access to the Countryside Act 1949 (Note: National Parks and Access to the Countryside Act 1949 (12, 13 & 14 Geo. 6. c. 97)) relating to the treatment of derelict land; to amend the law with respect to the power of municipal boroughs to use the general rate fund and borrow for non-statutory purposes; to apply Part II of the Town and Country Planning Act 1959 (Note: Town and Country Planning Act 1959 (7 & 8 Eliz. 2. c. 53)) to corporate land; and for purposes connected with the matters aforesaid.
| Statute Law Revision Act 1963 (repealed) | 1963 c. 30 | 31 July 1963 |
An Act to revise the statute law by repealing obsolete, spent, unnecessary or superseded enactments. (Repealed by Statute Law (Repeals) Act 1974 (c. 22))
| Weights and Measures Act 1963 (repealed) | 1963 c. 31 | 31 July 1963 |
An Act to make amended provision with respect to weights and measures, and for connected purposes. (Repealed by Weights and Measures Act 1985 (c. 72))
| Public Lavatories (Turnstiles) Act 1963 | 1963 c. 32 | 31 July 1963 |
An Act to make it the duty of local authorities to abolish turnstiles in public lavatories and sanitary conveniences.
| London Government Act 1963 | 1963 c. 33 | 31 July 1963 |
An Act to make provision with respect to local government and the functions of local authorities in the metropolitan area; to assimilate certain provisions of the Local Government Act 1933 (Note: Local Government Act 1933 (23 & 24 Geo. 5. c. 51)) to provisions for corresponding purposes contained in the London Government Act 1939; (Note: London Government Act 1939 (2 & 3 Geo. 6. c. 40)) to make an adjustment of the metropolitan police district; and for connected purposes.
| Rhodesia and Nyasaland Act 1963 | 1963 c. 34 | 31 July 1963 |
An Act to confer on Her Majesty in Council powers requisite to provide for the dissolution of the Federation of Rhodesia and Nyasaland, or the secession therefrom of any of the Territories comprised in the Federation; and for purposes connected with the matters aforesaid.
| Malaysia Act 1963 | 1963 c. 35 | 31 July 1963 |
An Act to make provision for and in connection with the federation of North Borneo, Sarawak and Singapore with the existing States of the Federation of Malaya.
| Deer Act 1963 (repealed) | 1963 c. 36 | 31 July 1963 |
An Act to provide close seasons for deer; to prohibit the killing and taking of deer by certain devices and at certain times and to restrict the use of vehicles in connection with the killing and taking of deer; and for purposes connected with the matters aforesaid. (Repealed by Deer Act 1991 (c. 54))
| Children and Young Persons Act 1963 | 1963 c. 37 | 31 July 1963 |
An Act to amend the law relating to children and young persons; and for purposes connected therewith.
| Water Resources Act 1963 | 1963 c. 38 | 31 July 1963 |
An Act to provide for the establishment of river authorities and a Water Resources Board, to confer on them, and on the Minister of Housing and Local Government, new functions in relation to water resources in England and Wales, and to provide for the transfer to river authorities of functions previously exercisable by river boards and other bodies; to make further provision for controlling the abstraction and impounding of water, for imposing charges in respect of licences to abstract or impound water, and for securing the protection and proper use of inland waters and water in underground strata; to enable corresponding provision to be made in relation to the Thames and Lee catchment areas and certain other areas in or adjacent to London; and for purposes connected with the matters aforesaid.
| Criminal Justice (Scotland) Act 1963 | 1963 c. 39 | 31 July 1963 |
An Act to amend the law of Scotland relating to the imprisonment and detention of offenders and other persons; to make further provision as to the treatment of prisoners and other persons committed to custody, including provision for their supervision within the British Islands after discharge, for the management of approved schools and for the treatment of persons detained therein; to amend the law relating to the payment of fines and detention in default of payment thereof within Great Britain; to alter the law relating to the proceedings of criminal courts in Scotland and to legal aid in such proceedings; to alter the law relating to the enforcement of warrants of arrest and the service of process in Great Britain; to provide for the execution in Scotland of warrants issued by courts in the Isle of Man; to provide for the appointment of additional judges of the Court of Session; to make certain consequential amendments to the First Offenders Act 1958 (Note: First Offenders Act 1958 (6 & 7 Eliz. 2. c. 31)) and the Criminal Justice Act 1961; (Note: Criminal Justice Act 1961 (9 & 10 Eliz. 2. c. 39)) and for purposes connected with the aforesaid matters.
| Commonwealth Development Act 1963 (repealed) | 1963 c. 40 | 31 July 1963 |
An Act to extend the area of operation and alter the name of the Colonial Development Corporation; and to amend sections 1, 4 and 6 of the Colonial Development and Welfare Act 1959. (Note: Colonial Development and Welfare Act 1959 (7 & 8 Eliz. 2. c. 71)) (Repealed by Commonwealth Development Corporation Act 1978 (c. 2))
| Offices, Shops and Railway Premises Act 1963 | 1963 c. 41 | 31 July 1963 |
An Act to make fresh provision for securing the health, safety and welfare of persons employed to work in office or shop premises and provision for securing the health, safety and welfare of persons employed to work in certain railway premises; to amend certain provisions of the Factories Act 1961; (Note: Factories Act 1961 (9 & 10 Eliz. 2. c. 34)) and for purposes connected with the matters aforesaid.
| Dog Racing (Betting Days) Act 1963 (repealed) | 1963 c. 42 | 31 July 1963 |
An Act to provide for the fixing of days when betting facilities may be provided on licensed tracks being dog racecourses in place of betting days lost due to weather conditions or other circumstances. (Repealed by Betting, Gaming and Lotteries (Amendment) Act 1971 (c. 26))
| Animal Boarding Establishments Act 1963 | 1963 c. 43 | 31 July 1963 |
An Act to regulate the keeping of boarding establishments for animals; and for purposes connected therewith.
| Wills Act 1963 | 1963 c. 44 | 31 July 1963 |
An Act to repeal the Wills Act 1861 (Note: Wills Act 1861 (24 & 25 Vict. c. 114)) and make new provision in lieu thereof; and to provide that certain testamentary instruments shall be probative for the purpose of the conveyance of heritable property in Scotland.
| Matrimonial Causes Act 1963 (repealed) | 1963 c. 45 | 31 July 1963 |
An Act to amend the law relating to matrimonial causes; to facilitate reconciliation in such causes; and for purposes connected with the matters aforesaid. (Repealed by Matrimonial Causes Act 1965 (c. 72))
| Local Government (Financial Provisions) Act 1963 | 1963 c. 46 | 31 July 1963 |
An Act to extend the powers of local authorities to defray expenses incurred by their members and officers, or by other members of their committees or sub-committees, and to contribute or subscribe to other local authorities and to bodies having activities connected with local government; to authorise certain expenditure by local authorities for the benefit of their areas or inhabitants but not otherwise authorised; to make further provision with respect to borrowing by local authorities, the management of local authority debt, the application by local authorities of capital funds, renewal and repair funds, unexpended balances of loans and capital money received by way of financial adjustment; and for purposes connected with the matters aforesaid.
| Limitation Act 1963 | 1963 c. 47 | 31 July 1963 |
An Act to extend in certain cases the time-limit for bringing legal proceedings where damages are claimed which consist of or include damages or solatium in respect of personal injuries (including any disease or impairment of a person's physical or mental condition) or in respect of a person's death; to limit the time within which proceedings for contribution may be brought under section 6 of the Law Reform (Married Women and Tortfeasors) Act 1935 (Note: Law Reform (Married Women and Tortfeasors) Act 1935 (25 & 26 Geo. 5. c. 30)) or section 3 (2) of the Law Reform (Miscellaneous Provisions) (Scotland) Act 1940; (Note: Law Reform (Miscellaneous Provisions) (Scotland) Act 1940 (3 & 4 Geo. 6. c. 42)) to make further provision as to the application of the Limitation (Enemies and War Prisoners) Act 1945 (Note: Limitation (Enemies and War Prisoners) Act 1945 (8 & 9 Geo. 6. c. 16)) to Northern Ireland; and for purposes connected with the matters aforesaid.
| Peerage Act 1963 | 1963 c. 48 | 31 July 1963 |
An Act to authorise the disclaimer for life of certain hereditary peerages; to include among the peers qualified to sit in the House of Lords all peers in the peerage of Scotland and peeresses in their own right in the peerages of England, Scotland, Great Britain and the United Kingdom; to remove certain disqualifications of peers in the peerage of Ireland in relation to the House of Commons and elections thereto; and for purposes connected with the matters aforesaid.
| Contracts of Employment Act 1963 (repealed) | 1963 c. 49 | 31 July 1963 |
An Act to require a minimum period of notice to terminate the employment of those who have been employed for a qualifying period, to provide for matters connected with the giving of the notice, and to require employers to give written particulars of terms of employment. (Repealed by Contracts of Employment Act 1972 (c. 53))
| Television Act 1963 (repealed) | 1963 c. 50 | 31 July 1963 |
An Act to extend the period for which the Independent Television Authority are to provide television services, to make further provision with respect to the control exercisable by the Authority over the programmes broadcast by them and over programme contractors, to require additional payments from programme contractors which will not form part of the revenue of the Authority, and to amend in other respects the law relating to the Authority and broadcasting by the Authority. (Repealed by Television Act 1964 (c. 21))
| Land Compensation (Scotland) Act 1963 | 1963 c. 51 | 31 July 1963 |
An Act to consolidate the Acquisition of Land (Assessment of Compensation) Act 1919 (Note: Acquisition of Land (Assessment of Compensation) Act 1919 (9 & 10 Geo. 5. c. 57)) and certain other enactments relating to the assessment of compensation in respect of compulsory acquisitions of interests in land; to the withdrawal of notices to treat; and to the payment of additional compensation and of allowances in connection with such acquisitions or with certain sales by agreement of interests in land; with corrections and improvements made under the Consolidation of Enactments (Procedure) Act 1949. (Note: Consolidation of Enactments (Procedure) Act 1949 (12, 13 & 14 Geo. 6. c. 33))
| Public Order Act 1963 | 1963 c. 52 | 31 July 1963 |
An Act to increase the penalties for offences under section 5 of the Public Order Act 1936 (Note: Public Order Act 1936 (1 Edw. 8 & 1 Geo. 6. c. 6)) and section 1 of the Public Meeting Act 1908. (Note: Public Meeting Act 1908 (8 Edw. 7. c. 66))
| Performers' Protection Act 1963 (repealed) | 1963 c. 53 | 31 July 1963 |
An Act to amend the law relating to the protection of performers so as to enable effect to be given to a Convention entered into at Rome on 26th October 1961. (Repealed by Copyright, Designs and Patents Act 1988 (c. 48))
| Kenya Independence Act 1963 | 1963 c. 54 | 3 December 1963 |
An Act to make provision for, and in connection with, the attainment by Kenya of fully responsible status within the Commonwealth, including provision for terminating the giving of financial and other assistance to the East African Common Services Organisation under the Colonial Development and Welfare Act 1959.
| Zanzibar Act 1963 | 1963 c. 55 | 3 December 1963 |
An Act to make provision in connection with Zanzibar becoming an independent State within the Commonwealth.
| Bahama Islands (Constitution) Act 1963 (repealed) | 1963 c. 56 | 3 December 1963 |
An Act to provide for the grant of a new constitution for the Bahama Islands. (Repealed by Bahamas Independence Act 1973 (c. 27))
| Nigeria Republic Act 1963 | 1963 c. 57 | 18 December 1963 |
An Act to make provision as to the operation of the law in relation to Nigeria as a Republic within the Commonwealth.
| Expiring Laws Continuance Act 1963 (repealed) | 1963 c. 58 | 18 December 1963 |
An Act to continue certain expiring laws. (Repealed by Statute Law (Repeals) Act 1971 (c. 52))
| Electricity and Gas Act 1963 (repealed) | 1963 c. 59 | 18 December 1963 |
An Act to increase the statutory limits imposed on the amounts outstanding in respect of borrowings by the Electricity Council and Electricity Boards and the Gas Council and Area Gas Boards; to make further provision for Exchequer advances to certain of those bodies; to provide in certain cases for compensating members of those bodies for loss of office; and for purposes connected with the matters aforesaid. (Repealed by Electricity Act 1989 (c. 29))

== Local acts ==
| Short title | Citation | Royal assent |
Long title
| Clyde Navigation Order Confirmation Act 1963 | 1963 c. i | 28 February 1963 |
An Act to confirm a Provisional Order under the Private Legislation Procedure (Scotland) Act 1936, (Note: Private Legislation Procedure (Scotland) Act 1936 (26 Geo. 5 & 1 Edw. 8. c. 52)) relating to Clyde Navigation.
| | Clyde Navigation Order 1963 Provisional Order to authorise the Trustees of the Clyde Navigation to execute new works, to levy new rates for the use thereof, to amend the provisions of the Clyde Navigation Acts, 1858 to 1960, and for other purposes. | |
| Scottish Pulp Mill (Water Supply) Order Confirmation Act 1963 | 1963 c. ii | 28 February 1963 |
An Act to confirm a Provisional Order under the Private Legislation Procedure (Scotland) Act 1936, relating to the Scottish Pulp Mill (Water Supply).
| | Scottish Pulp Mill (Water Supply) Order 1963 Provisional Order to empower Scottish Pulp (Development) Limited to take for industrial purposes water discharged from works of the Lochaber Power Company, and for other purposes. | |
| Bradford Corporation (Conditioning House) Act 1963 (repealed) | 1963 c. iii | 15 May 1963 |
An Act to extend the powers conferred upon the lord mayor, aldermen and citizens of the city of Bradford by the Bradford Corporation (Various Powers) Act, 1887, (Note: Bradford Corporation (Various Powers) Act 1887 (50 & 51 Vict. c. cxxxii)) and subsequent Acts in connection with the testing of articles at the conditioning house established under the said Act of 1887, to remove certain doubts as to those powers, to amend the said Act of 1887, to make other provisions in connection with the matters aforesaid; and for other purposes. (Repealed by West Yorkshire Act 1980 (c. xiv))
| Shell Chemicals Distributing Company of Egypt Act 1963 | 1963 c. iv | 15 May 1963 |
An Act to make provision for the transfer to the United Arab Republic of the registered office of Shell Chemicals Distributing Company of Egypt Limited; for the cesser of application to that company of the provisions of the Companies Act, 1948; (Note: Companies Act 1948 (11 & 12 Geo. 6. c. 38)) and for other purposes incidental thereto.
| BP Refinery (Kwinana) Act 1963 | 1963 c. v | 15 May 1963 |
An Act to make provision for the transfer to the State of Western Australia in the Commonwealth of Australia of the registered office of BP Refinery (Kwinana) Limited for the purpose of enabling that company to be deemed to be incorporated in such state, for the cesser of application to that company of provisions of the Companies Act, 1948, consequent thereon, and for other purposes incidental thereto.
| Commonwealth Development Finance Company Act 1963 | 1963 c. vi | 15 May 1963 |
An Act to exempt Commonwealth Development Finance Company Limited from the provisions of the Moneylenders Acts, 1900 to 1927, as from the incorporation of the Company until the sixth day of July, nineteen hundred and sixty-two; and for other purposes.
| Sunderland Corporation Act 1963 (repealed) | 1963 c. vii | 15 May 1963 |
An Act to repeal or amend certain enactments relating to the powers of the mayor, aldermen and burgesses of the county borough of Sunderland to advance money on loan to the River Wear Commissioners and guarantee repayment of and the payment of interest upon money borrowed or to be borrowed by the said commissioners, and of borrowing in respect thereof; and for other purposes. (Repealed by Sunderland Corporation Act 1972 (c. xxiii))
| Watford Corporation Act 1963 | 1963 c. viii | 15 May 1963 |
An Act to provide for the removal of restrictions attaching to the Beechen Grove Chapel Burial Ground in the borough of Watford; to authorise the use of the said burial ground for building or otherwise; and for other purposes.
| Glasgow Corporation Order Confirmation Act 1963 | 1963 c. ix | 10 July 1963 |
An Act to confirm a Provisional Order under the Private Legislation Procedure (Scotland) Act 1936, relating to Glasgow Corporation.
| | Glasgow Corporation Order 1963 Provisional Order to enact provisions with respect to premises where poultry is kept, slaughtered and dressed; to amend the Glasgow Corporation Superannuation Scheme 1955; to amend the Glasgow Sewage Acts, 1935 to 1961; to authorise the Corporation to appoint more than one registrar in any registration district of the city; and for other purposes. | |
| Ministry of Housing and Local Government Provisional Order Confirmation (Bolton) Act 1963 | 1963 c. x | 10 July 1963 |
An Act to confirm a Provisional Order of the Minister of Housing and Local Government relating to the county borough of Bolton.
| | Bolton Order 1963 Provisional Order partially repealing and amending certain local Acts and a Provisional Order. | |
| Universities of Durham and Newcastle upon Tyne Act 1963 | 1963 c. xi | 10 July 1963 |
An Act to dissolve the council of the Durham Colleges in the University of Durham and to transfer the property and liabilities of that council to the University of Durham, to enact further provisions with regard to the University of Durham, to incorporate the University of Newcastle upon Tyne, to dissolve the council of King's College Newcastle upon Tyne in the University of Durham and to transfer the property and liabilities of that council to the University of Newcastle upon Tyne, to enact provisions with regard to the University of Newcastle upon Tyne; and for other purposes.
| British Waterways Act 1963 | 1963 c. xii | 10 July 1963 |
An Act to authorise the closing to navigation of portions of certain waterways; and for other purposes.
| Marine Society Act 1963 | 1963 c. xiii | 10 July 1963 |
An Act to confer further powers on the Marine Society; and for other purposes.
| Saint Dionis Backchurch Churchyard Act 1963 | 1963 c. xiv | 10 July 1963 |
An Act to free the churchyard appurtenant to the former church of Saint Dionis Backchurch in the city of London from the restrictions attaching to it as a disused burial ground in the city of London, and to authorise the subsequent use or disposition thereof; and for other purposes.
| Saint Nicholas Acons Churchyard Act 1963 | 1963 c. xv | 10 July 1963 |
An Act to free the churchyard appurtenant to the former church of Saint Nicholas Acons in the city of London from the restrictions attaching to it as a disused burial ground in the city of London, and to authorise the subsequent use or disposition thereof; and for other purposes.
| Mersey Docks and Harbour Board Act 1963 | 1963 c. xvi | 10 July 1963 |
An Act to increase the borrowing powers of the Mersey Docks and Harbour Board, to make further provision with respect to the rates and charges leviable by the Board; and for other purposes.
| London County Council (General Powers) Act 1963 | 1963 c. xvii | 10 July 1963 |
An Act to confer further powers upon the London County Council and other authorities and for other purposes.
| British Railways Act 1963 | 1963 c. xviii | 10 July 1963 |
An Act to empower the British Railways Board to construct works and to acquire lands; to extend the time for the compulsory purchase of certain lands; to confer further powers on the Board; and for other purposes.
| Loch Turret Water Board (Hydro-Electric Development) Order Confirmation Act 1963 | 1963 c. xix | 31 July 1963 |
An Act to confirm a Provisional Order under the Private Legislation Procedure (Scotland) Act 1936, relating to the Loch Turret Water Board (Hydro-Electric Development).
| | Loch Turret Water Board (Hydro-Electric Development) Order 1963 Provisional Order to confer further powers on the Loch Turret Water Board in connection with its water undertaking; to make use of the water power in the said undertaking for the generation of electricity for sale; and for other purposes. | |
| Ministry of Housing and Local Government Provisional Order Confirmation (Leeds) Act 1963 (repealed) | 1963 c. xx | 31 July 1963 |
An Act to confirm a Provisional Order of the Minister of Housing and Local Government relating to the city of Leeds. (Repealed by West Yorkshire Act 1980 (c. xiv))
| | Leeds Order 1963 Provisional Order partially repealing a local Act. (Note: Leeds Corporation (Consolidation) Act 1905 (5 Edw. 7. c. i)) | |
| Pier and Harbour Order (Gloucester Harbour) Confirmation Act 1963 | 1963 c. xxi | 31 July 1963 |
An Act to confirm a Provisional Order made by the Minister of Transport under the General Pier and Harbour Act 1861, (Note: General Pier and Harbour Act 1861 (24 & 25 Vict. c. 45)) relating to Gloucester Harbour.
| | Gloucester Harbour Order 1963 Provisional Order to extend the limits within which the Gloucester Harbour Trustees have authority; and for other purposes. | |
| Pier and Harbour Order (Yarmouth (Isle of Wight)) Confirmation Act 1963 | 1963 c. xxii | 31 July 1963 |
An Act to confirm a Provisional Order made by the Minister of Transport under the General Pier and Harbour Act 1861, relating to Yarmouth (Isle of Wight).
| | Yarmouth (Isle of Wight) Pier and Harbour Order 1963 Provisional Order to authorise the county council of the administrative county of the Isle of Wight to guarantee money borrowed by the Yarmouth (Isle of Wight) Harbour Commissioners; and for other purposes. | |
| Pier and Harbour Order (Bembridge Harbour) Confirmation Act 1963 | 1963 c. xxiii | 31 July 1963 |
An Act to confirm a Provisional Order made by the Minister of Transport under the General Pier and Harbour Act 1861, relating to Bembridge Harbour.
| | Bembridge Harbour Order 1963 Provisional Order to provide for the vesting in Bembridge Harbour Improvements Company Limited of the Bembridge Harbour (formerly known as Brading Harbour) to confer powers on the said Company with reference thereto and the maintenance, management and improvement thereof and for other purposes. | |
| London Transport Act 1963 | 1963 c. xxiv | 31 July 1963 |
An Act to empower the London Transport Board to construct works and to acquire lands, to confer further powers on the Board; and for other purposes.
| Medway Conservancy Act 1963 (repealed) | 1963 c. xxv | 31 July 1963 |
An Act to make further provision for the regulation of navigation in the approaches to the River Medway; to confer further powers upon the Conservators of the River Medway; and for other purposes. (Repealed by Medway Ports Authority Act 1973 (c. xxi))
| Great Yarmouth Port and Haven Act 1963 | 1963 c. xxvi | 31 July 1963 |
An Act to vary certain tolls leviable by the Great Yarmouth Port and Haven Commissioners; to confer further powers upon the Commissioners; and for other purposes
| Port of London Act 1963 (repealed) | 1963 c. xxvii | 31 July 1963 |
An Act to confer further powers on the Port of London Authority; and for other purposes. (Repealed by Port of London Act 1968 (c. xxxii))
| Factory Lane, Warrington (Level Crossing) Act 1963 | 1963 c. xxviii | 31 July 1963 |
An Act to authorise Joseph Crossfield & Sons Limited to construct a railway level crossing in the county borough of Warrington; and for other purposes.
| Dover Harbour Act 1963 | 1963 c. xxix | 31 July 1963 |
An Act to authorise the Dover Harbour Board to construct further works; and for other purposes.
| London County Council (Money) Act 1963 | 1963 c. xxx | 31 July 1963 |
An Act to regulate the expenditure on capital account and lending of money by the London County Council during the financial period from the first day of April, 1963, to the thirtieth day of September, 1964; and for other purposes.
| Clywedog Reservoir Joint Authority Act 1963 | 1963 c. xxxi | 31 July 1963 |
An Act to constitute the Clywedog Reservoir Joint Authority consisting of representatives of the lord mayors, aldermen and citizens of the cities of Birmingham and Coventry, the mayors, aldermen and burgesses of the boroughs of Shrewsbury and Wolverhampton, the mayor, aldermen and citizens of the city of Worcester, the Bristol Waterworks Company, the Central Electricity Generating Board, the Cheltenham and Gloucester Joint Water Board, the East Shropshire Water Board, the East Worcestershire Waterworks Company, the Montgomeryshire Water Board, the South Staffordshire Waterworks Company, the county council of the administrative county of Montgomery and the Severn River Board, to empower the Clywedog Reservoir Joint Authority to acquire lands, to construct works and to regulate the flow of water in the river Severn; to confer powers upon the constituent authorities of the said Authority; and for other purposes.
| Salvation Army Act 1963 | 1963 c. xxxii | 31 July 1963 |
An Act to establish a non-contributory pension fund for officers of the Salvation Army; to provide for the transfer to the fund of certain existing funds and for contributions to the fund from the general funds of the Salvation Army and from its associated charities and companies; to establish a board to administer the fund; to confer powers on the board to make rules determining the terms and conditions on which pensions are to be payable and to prescribe the first rules of the fund; and for other purposes.
| Killingholme Jetty Act 1963 | 1963 c. xxxiii | 31 July 1963 |
An Act to empower the Central Oil Refining Company Limited to construct works and to acquire lands; and for other purposes.
| City of London (Various Powers) Act 1963 | 1963 c. xxxiv | 31 July 1963 |
An Act to make provision with respect to the closing of the Metropolitan Cattle Market at Islington; the acquisition of land for the extension of the Central Criminal Court and the payment out of the general rate of the city of London of costs in connection with the court; the making of charges for the use of the Billingsgate, Leadenhall, Central London and Spitalfields markets; and for other purposes.
| London County Council (Improvements) Act 1963 | 1963 c. xxxv | 31 July 1963 |
An Act to empower the London County Council to execute street and other works and to acquire lands, to confer further powers on the London County Council; and for other purposes.
| Felixstowe Dock and Railway Act 1963 | 1963 c. xxxvi | 31 July 1963 |
An Act to abandon works authorised by the Felixstowe Dock and Railway Act, 1956, (Note: Felixstowe Dock and Railway Act 1956 (4 & 5 Eliz. 2. c. lxxxviii)) and empower the Felixstowe Dock and Railway Company to construct new works in substitution therefor; to extend and re-define the limits of the dock; to capitalise certain reserve funds and to authorise the raising of additional capital by the Company; to make provision with respect to the rates leviable by the Company in respect of the dock; and to confer further powers on the Company; and for other purposes.
| Durham County Council Act 1963 | 1963 c. xxxvii | 31 July 1963 |
An Act to confer further powers on the Durham County Council and on local authorities in the administrative county of Durham in relation to industry, lands and highways and the local government, improvement, health and finances of the county and of the boroughs and districts therein; and for other purposes.
| Bath Corporation Act 1963 | 1963 c. xxxviii | 31 July 1963 |
An Act to confer further powers on the mayor, aldermen and citizens of the city of Bath, to make further provision with regard to the health, local government, welfare, improvement and finances of the city; and for other purposes.

== Private and personal acts ==
| Short title | Citation | Royal assent |
Long title
| Lucas Estate Act 1963 | 1963 c. 1 | 31 July 1963 |
An Act to vary the trusts affecting certain settled property of the Baroness Lucas and Dingwall and to enlarge the powers of the trustees of the said settled property and for other purposes connected with the said settled property.

== See also ==
- List of acts of the Parliament of the United Kingdom
