= List of acts of the Parliament of Scotland from 1663 =

This is a list of acts of the Parliament of Scotland for the year 1663.

It lists acts of Parliament of the old Parliament of Scotland, that was merged with the old Parliament of England to form the Parliament of Great Britain, by the Union with England Act 1707 (c. 7).

For other years, see list of acts of the Parliament of Scotland. For the period after 1707, see list of acts of the Parliament of Great Britain.

== 1663 ==
The 3rd session of the 1st parliament of Charles II, held in Edinburgh from 18 June 1663.

Short title, or popular name	Citation	Royal assent
Long title
Lords of the Articles Act 1663 (repealed)	Vol. VII, p. 449 (Note: This is the citation in the Record Edition.); 1663 c. 1 (Note: This is the citation in the Duodecimal Edition.)	26 June 1663
Act concerning the constitution and election of the lords of the articles. Act concerning the constitution and election of the lords of the articles. (Repealed by Committees of Parliament Act 1690 (c. 3))
Billeting Act 1663 (repealed)	1663 c. 1 Vol. 2 after p. 37	1 July 1663
Commission for tryeing of the contriveance and carieing on of the Act of Billeting. Commission for trying of the contrivance and carrying on of the Act of Billeting. (Repealed by Statute Law Revision (Scotland) Act 1906 (6 Edw. 7. c. 38))
Protections Act 1663 (repealed)	1663 c. 2; 1663 c. 4	1 July 1663
Act against Protections. Act against Protections. (Repealed by Statute Law Revision (Scotland) Act 1906 (6 Edw. 7. c. 38))
Advocations Act 1663 (repealed)	1663 c. 3; 1663 c. 9	8 July 1663
Act anent the dischargeing of Advocations for sums within 200 merks. Act regarding the discharging of Advocations for sums within 200 merks. (Repealed by Statute Law Revision (Scotland) Act 1906 (6 Edw. 7. c. 38))
Minority Act 1663 (repealed)	1663 c. 4; 1663 c. 10	8 July 1663
Act in favours of Minors anent the dueties of the lands comprised from them. Act in favour of Minors, regarding the duties of the lands comprised from them. (Repealed by Bankruptcy and Diligence etc. (Scotland) Act 2007 (asp 3))
Beer in Shetland Act 1663 (repealed)	1663 c. 5 — (Note: This act is not listed in the Duodecimal Edition.)	8 July 1663
Act allowing the inhabitants of Zetland to import forrane drinking beir for ane yeer. Act allowing the inhabitants of Shetland to import foreign beer for one year. (Repealed by Statute Law Revision (Scotland) Act 1906 (6 Edw. 7. c. 38))
Not public and general	1663 c. 6 —	8 July 1663
Act ratifieing the Remission to George Campbell in Inverrary late Shirreff Deput of Argyll. Act ratifying the remission to George Campbell in Inveraray, late Sheriff Depute of Argyle.
Not public and general	1663 c. 7 —	8 July 1663
Act for annexing the Personage of Kinkell to the Deanrie of St Andrews. Act for annexing the Parsonage of Kinkell to the deanery of St Andrews.
Not public and general	1663 c. 8 —	8 July 1663
Act in favours of merchants in Glasgow dispenseing with their trading in forrane Bottoms for bygons. Act in favour of merchants in Glasgow, dispensing with trading in foreign boats for arrears.
Ecclesiastical Authority Act 1663 (repealed)	1663 c. 9; 1663 c. 2	10 July 1663
Act against separation and disobedience to Ecclesiastical Authority. Act against separation and disobedience to Ecclesiastical Authority. (Repealed by Statute Law Repeal (No. 2) Act 1690 (c. 57))
Stipend Act 1663 (repealed)	1663 c. 10 —	10 July 1663
Act allowing to the Ministers who served befor and in the yeer 1662 the halff of the Stipend due for that yeer. Act allowing to the Ministers who served before and in the year 1662, the half of the stipend due for that year. (Repealed by Statute Law Revision (Scotland) Act 1906 (6 Edw. 7. c. 38))
Not public and general	1663 c. 11 —	10 July 1663
Ratification in favours of Sir Peter Wedderburne of Gosfoord Knight Advocat. Ratification in favour of Sir Peter Wedderburn of Gosford, Knight, Advocate.
Ruinous Houses in Burghs Act 1663 (repealed)	1663 c. 12; 1663 c. 6	17 July 1663
Act anent ruinous houses in Royall Burghs. Act regarding ruinous houses in Royal Burghs. (Repealed by Statute Law Revision (Scotland) Act 1964 (c. 80))
Import of Spirits Act 1663 (repealed)	1663 c. 13; 1663 c. 7	17 July 1663
Act dischargeing the importation of strong waters &c. Act discharging the importation of spirits, etc. (Repealed by Statute Law Revision (Scotland) Act 1906 (6 Edw. 7. c. 38))
Tin Act 1663 (repealed)	1663 c. 14; 1663 c. 8	17 July 1663
Act dischargeing the mixing of tin with lead. Act discharging the mixing of tin with lead. (Repealed by Statute Law Revision (Scotland) Act 1906 (6 Edw. 7. c. 38))
Lyon King of Arms Act 1663 (repealed)	1663 c. 15 —	17 July 1663
Act rescinding a former act (Note: Lyon King of Arms Act 1662 (c. 53)) past in the last session of Parliament anent some fies acclamed as due to the Lord Lyons office. Act rescinding a former act passed in the last session of parliament, regarding some fees acclaimed due to the Lord Lyon's office. (Repealed by Statute Law Revision (Scotland) Act 1906 (6 Edw. 7. c. 38))
Not public and general	1663 c. 16 —	31 July 1663
Act in favours of Sir James Hammilton younger of Preistfield. Act in favour of Sir James Hamilton the younger of Priestfield.
Declaration de fideli Act 1663 (repealed)	1663 c. 17; 1663 c. 3	7 August 1663
Additional Act concerning the Declaration to be signed by all persons in public trust. Additional Act concerning the Declaration to be signed by all persons in public trust. (Repealed by Statute Law Repeal (No. 2) Act 1690 (c. 57))
Irish Corn Act 1663 (repealed)	1663 c. 18; 1663 c. 14	7 August 1663
Act imposeing a custome upon corne imported from Ireland into this Kingdome. Act imposing a custom upon corn imported from Ireland into this Kingdom. (Repealed by Statute Law Revision (Scotland) Act 1906 (6 Edw. 7. c. 38))
Forfeited Persons Act 1663 (repealed)	1663 c. 19 —	14 August 1663
Act concerning the pardoning and restoreing the children of forfeited persons. Act concerning the pardoning and restoring of the children of forfeited persons. (Repealed by Statute Law Revision (Scotland) Act 1906 (6 Edw. 7. c. 38))
Not public and general	1663 c. 20 —	14 August 1663
Act in favours of William Baillie of Litlegill for repareing and upholding the bridge over Clyde at Ramelwellcraigs &c. Act in favour of William Baillie of Littlegill, for repairing and maintaining a bridge in Clydesdale at Ramelwellcraigs, etc.
Not public and general	1663 c. 21 —	14 August 1663
Act in favours of Sir Harie Bruce of Clakmanan knight for changeing the fair day of the toun of Clakmanan. Act in favour of Sir Henry Bruce of Clackmannan, for changing the fair day of the town of Clackmannan.
National Synod Act 1663 (repealed)	1663 c. 22; 1663 c. 5	21 August 1663
Act for the establishment and constitution of a Nationall Synod. Act for the establishment and constitution of a National Synod. (Repealed by Confession of Faith Ratification Act 1690 (c. 7))
Customs Act 1663 (repealed)	1663 c. 23; 1663 c. 13	21 August 1663
Act for ane new Imposition upon English commodities. Act for a new Imposition upon English commodities. (Repealed by Statute Law Revision (Scotland) Act 1906 (6 Edw. 7. c. 38))
Customs (No. 2) Act 1663 (repealed)	1663 c. 24 —	21 August 1663
Act and Reference to the Privy Councill concerning the imposition layd on English commodities. Act and Reference to the Privy Council concerning the imposition laid on English commodities. (Repealed by Statute Law Revision (Scotland) Act 1906 (6 Edw. 7. c. 38))
Silkweavers Act 1663 (repealed)	1663 c. 25 —	21 August 1663
Act in favours of silkweivers printers &c. Act in favours of silkweavers, printers, etc. (Repealed by Statute Law Revision (Scotland) Act 1906 (6 Edw. 7. c. 38))
Not public and general	1663 c. 26 —	21 August 1663
Act for changeing the name of Souter of late used by some of the name of Johnstoun. Act for changing the name of Souter, of late used by some of the name of Johnston.
Forfeited Persons Act 1663 (repealed)	1663 c. 27; 1663 c. 4	2 September 1663
Commission concerning the annualrents due by persons forfeited by the Usurpers. Commission concerning the annualrents due by persons forfeited by the Usurpers. (Repealed by Statute Law Revision (Scotland) Act 1906 (6 Edw. 7. c. 38))
Supply Act 1663 (repealed)	1663 c. 28; 1663 c. 25	2 September 1663
Act regulating the proportions of the Excise in the severall Shires and Burghs. Act regulating the proportions of the Excise in the several Shires and Burghs. (Repealed by Statute Law Revision (Scotland) Act 1906 (6 Edw. 7. c. 38))
Money Act 1663 (repealed)	1663 c. 29 —	2 September 1663
Act against exportation of Money forth of the Kingdome. Act against exportation of Money out of the Kingdom. (Repealed by Statute Law Revision (Scotland) Act 1906 (6 Edw. 7. c. 38))
Statute Repeal Act 1663 (repealed)	1663 c. 30; Vol. 2, p. 373	9 September 1663
Act rescinding two acts (Note: 'act concerning persons to be excepted from publict trust' ?) (Note: 'act appoynting the maner of voteing by billets' ?) past in the second session of this Parliament the one for excepting of persons from public trust and the other for voteing the same by Billets. Act rescinding two acts passed in the second session of this Parliament, one for excepting from public trust, and the other for voting the same by Billets. (Repealed by Statute Law Revision (Scotland) Act 1906 (6 Edw. 7. c. 38))
Manses Act 1663 (repealed)	1663 c. 31; 1663 c. 21	9 September 1663
Act anent Manses and Gleibs and poinding for Ministers stipends. Act regarding Manses and Glebes, and poinding for Ministers' stipends. (Repealed by Statute Law (Repeals) Act 1974 (c. 22))
Not public and general	1663 c. 32 —	9 September 1663
In favours of Doctor Alex^{r} Colvill Professor of Divinity in the University of S^{t} Andrews. Act in favour of Doctor Alexander Colville, Professor of Divinity in the University of St Andrews.
Attendance in Parliament Act 1663 (repealed)	1663 c. 33 —	9 September 1663
Act concerning the Rideing of the Parliament and the penalties of such as shall be absent from it. Act concerning the Riding of the Parliament, and the penalties of such as shall be absent from it. (Repealed by Statute Law Revision (Scotland) Act 1906 (6 Edw. 7. c. 38))
Teind Commission Act 1663 (repealed)	1663 c. 34; 1663 c. 28	11 September 1663
Commission for plantation of Kirks and valuation of Teinds. Commission for plantation of Churches and valuation of Tithes. (Repealed by Statute Law Revision (Scotland) Act 1964 (c. 80))
Agriculture Act 1663 (repealed)	1663 c. 35; 1663 c. 12	17 September 1663
Act for encouragement of Tillage and Pasturage. Act for encouragement of Tillage and Pasturage. (Repealed by Statute Law Revision (Scotland) Act 1964 (c. 80))
Comprisings Act 1663 (repealed)	1663 c. 36; 1663 c. 22	17 September 1663
Act anent Comprisings. Act regarding Comprisings. (Repealed by Statute Law Revision (Scotland) Act 1906 (6 Edw. 7. c. 38))
Not public and general	1663 c. 37 —	17 September 1663
Act in favours of M^{r} John Wilkie Collector of the vacant stipends. Act in favour of Mr John Wilkie, Collector of the vacant stipends.
Not public and general	1663 c. 38 —	17 September 1663
Act appointing some scollers to be enterteaned out of the vacand stipends of Argyll. Act appointing some scholars to be entertained out of the vacant stipends of Argyll.
Not public and general	1663 c. 39 —	17 September 1663
Act appointing some scollers to be enterteaned out of the vacand stipends of the Yles. Act appointing some scholars to be entertained out of the vacant stipends of the Isles.
Not public and general	1663 c. 40 —	17 September 1663
Act allowing a yeers vacant stipend of the kirk of Kinlosse for biging a schoole ther. Act allowing a year's vacant stipend of the church of Kinloss for building a school there.
Not public and general	1663 c. 41 —	17 September 1663
Act for repairing and upholding the bridges of Dalkeith. Act for repairing and maintaining the bridges of Dalkeith.
Tender of Loyalty Act 1663 (repealed)	1663 c. 42; 1663 c. 26	23 September 1663
A humble tender to his Sacred Majestie of the duetie and loyaltie of his antient Kindome of Scotland. A humble tender to his Sacred Majesty of the duty and loyalty of his ancient Kingdom of Scotland. (Repealed by Statute Law Revision (Scotland) Act 1906 (6 Edw. 7. c. 38))
Markets Act 1663 (repealed)	1663 c. 43; 1663 c. 19	23 September 1663
Act dischargeing Monday and Saturday mercats in Royall Burghs. Act discharging Monday and Saturday markets in Royal Burghs. (Repealed by Statute Law Revision (Scotland) Act 1906 (6 Edw. 7. c. 38))
Not public and general	1663 c. 44 —	23 September 1663
Act in favours of the Viscountess of Oxenfoord anent the aliment and education of her son Robert now Viscount of Oxenfoord. Act in favour of the Viscountess of Oxfuird, regarding the aliment and education of her son Robert, now Viscount of Oxfuird.
Not public and general	1663 c. 45 —	23 September 1663
Act in favours of John Halyburtoun of Garvockwood anent the makeing up of his writts. Act in favour of John Haliburton of Garvock Wood, concerning the making up of his writs.
Not public and general	1663 c. 46 —	23 September 1663
Act for changeing the weikly mercats within the burgh of Pittenweym. Act for changing the weekly markets within the burgh of Pittenweem.
Not public and general	1663 c. 47 —	23 September 1663
Act in favours of Sir John Keith of Caskieben for a yeerlie fair at the toun of Monkegie. Act in favour of Sir John Keith of Caskieben, for a yearly fair at the town of Monkeigie.
Not public and general	1663 c. 48 —	23 September 1663
Act in favours of the Earl of Seaforths (Note: George Mackenzie, 2nd Earl of Seaforth.) creditors. Act in favour of Earl of Seaforth's creditors
Not public and general	1663 c. 49 —	23 September 1663
Act for upholding the bridge of Kippen. Act for maintaining the bridge of Kippen.
Not public and general	1663 c. 50 —	23 September 1663
Act in favours of the heritors and parichoners of Kippen for tuo yeerlie fairs at the kirk of Kippen. Act in favour of the heritors and parishioners of Kippen, for two yearly fairs at the church of Kippen.
Not public and general	1663 c. 51 —	23 September 1663
Act in favours of Mr James Scott Minister at Tungland. Act in favour of Mr James Scott, minister at Tongland.
Beggars Act 1663 (repealed)	1663 c. 52; 1663 c. 16	25 September 1663
Act concerning Beggars and Vagabonds. Act concerning Beggars and Vagabonds. (Repealed by Statute Law Revision (Scotland) Act 1906 (6 Edw. 7. c. 38))
Lord Cranstoun's Act 1663 Not public and general	1663 c. 53 —	25 September 1663
Act in favours of the Lord Cranstoun. (Note: John Cranstoun, 2nd Lord Cranstoun.); Act in favour of the Lord Cranston.
Whithorn Fairs Act 1663 Not public and general	1663 c. 54 —	25 September 1663
Act for changeing the tuo yeerlie fairs within the burgh of Whithorn. Act for changing the two yearly fairs within the burgh of Whithorn.
Preston Fairs Act 1663 Not public and general	1663 c. 55 —	25 September 1663
Act in favours of James Marques of Douglas (Note: James Douglas, 2nd Marquess of Douglas.) for tuo fairs yeerlie to be keept in the toun of Prestoun. Act in favour of James, Marquis of Douglas, for two fairs yearly to be kept in the town of Preston.
Coal Act 1663 (repealed)	1663 c. 56; 1663 c. 17	29 September 1663
Act anent the measure of Coall. Act regarding the measurement of Coal. (Repealed by Statute Law Revision (Scotland) Act 1906 (6 Edw. 7. c. 38))
Measures Act 1663 (repealed)	1663 c. 57; 1663 c. 18	29 September 1663
Act anent the Foot measure. Act regarding the Foot measurement. (Repealed by Statute Law Revision (Scotland) Act 1906 (6 Edw. 7. c. 38))
Stonehaven Fairs and Market Act 1663 Not public and general	1663 c. 58 —	29 September 1663
Act for tuo yeirlie fairs and a weeklie mercat in Stanehyve. Act for two yearly fairs and a weekly market in Stonehaven.
Cards Act 1663 (repealed)	1663 c. 59 —	29 September 1663
Act concerning the makeing of Cards. Act concerning the making of Cards. (Repealed by Statute Law Revision (Scotland) Act 1906 (6 Edw. 7. c. 38))
Not public and general	1663 c. 60 —	29 September 1663
Act and Decreit in favours of William Earle of Roxburgh (Note: William Ker, 2nd Earl of Roxburghe.) against Sir John Weymes of Bogie. Act and Judgment in favour of William, Earl of Roxburghe, against Sir John Wemyss of Bogie.
Not public and general	1663 c. 61 —	29 September 1663
Act in favours of Johne Campbell Captane of Dunstaffnage and others. Act in favour of John Campbell, Captain of Dunstaffnage, and others.
Universities Act 1663 (repealed)	1663 c. 62; 1663 c. 24	2 October 1663
Act for additional provision in favours of the Universities. Act for additional provision in favours of the Universities. (Repealed by Vacant Stipends Act 1672 (c. 46))
Lintseed Act 1663 (repealed)	1663 c. 63; 1663 c. 20	2 October 1663
Act anent lintseed hempseed and steel. Act regarding linseed, hemp seed and steel. (Repealed by Statute Law Revision (Scotland) Act 1906 (6 Edw. 7. c. 38))
Not public and general	1663 c. 64 —	2 October 1663
Act for payment of some debt due by the Shire of Dumfreis. Act for payment of some debt due by the Shire of Dumfries.
Not public and general	1663 c. 65 —	2 October 1663
Act in favours of Alexander Irving of Drum for a yeerly fair and weekly mercat at the kirktoun of Tarlan in Cromar. Act in favour of Alexander Irvine of Drum, for a yearly fair and a weekly market at the kirktown of Tarland in Cromar.
Crown Rents Act 1663 (repealed)	1663 c. 66; 1663 c. 15	6 October 1663
Act for inbringing his Majesties rents. Act for collecting his Majesty's rents. (Repealed by Statute Law Revision (Scotland) Act 1906 (6 Edw. 7. c. 38))
Not public and general	1663 c. 67 —	6 October 1663
Act and Ratification of the Contract of mariage betuixt the Duke (Note: James Scott, 1st Duke of Monmouth.) & Dutches (Note: Anne Scott, 1st Duchess of Buccleuch.) of Buccleugh. Act and Ratification of the Contract of marriage between the Duke and Duchess of Buccleuch.
Not public and general	1663 c. 68 —	6 October 1663
Act concerning the stipend of the Ministers of the Cannowgate. Act concerning the stipend of the Ministers of the Canongate.
Not public and general	1663 c. 69 —	8 October 1663
Act and Remit to the Lords of Session of certain claims of the Ladie Bramford relict (Note: Clara Berner, third wife of the Earl of Forth.) and of the Ladie Forester (Note: Lady Jane Ruthven.) daughter of the late Earle of Forth (Note: Patrick Ruthven, 1st Earl of Forth.) against the Duke (Note: William Hamilton, Duke of Hamilton.) and Dutches (Note: Anne Hamilton, 3rd Duchess of Hamilton.) of Hammilton, the Earles of Erroll (Note: Gilbert Hay, 11th Earl of Erroll.) Roxburgh (Note: William Ker, 2nd Earl of Roxburghe.) and Weymes. (Note: David Wemyss, 2nd Earl of Wemyss.); Act and Remit to the Lords of Session of certain claims of the Lady Brentford, widow, and the Lady Forrester, daughter of the late Earl of Forth, against the Duke and Duchess of Hamilton, the Earls of Erroll, Roxburghe and Wemyss.
Glasgow University Act 1663 Not public and general	1663 c. 70 —	8 October 1663
Act in favours of the Universitie of Glasgow. Act in favour of the University of Glasgow.
Not public and general	1663 c. 71 —	8 October 1663
Act for ane imposition for repairing and keeping up the Bridge of Sauchtonhall. Act for an imposition for repairing and keeping up the bridge of Saughtonhall.
Table of Fees Act 1663 (repealed)	1663 c. 72 —	8 October 1663
Commission for ordering the pryces of offices writs and sealls. Commission for ordering the prices of offices, writs and seals. (Repealed by Statute Law Revision (Scotland) Act 1906 (6 Edw. 7. c. 38))
Not public and general	1663 c. 73 —	8 October 1663
Commission for calling in of Alexander Inglis of Kingask his accompts as Collector for the Shirreffdome of Fyffe. Commission for calling in of Alexander Inglis of Kingask's accounts as Collector for the Sheriffdom of Fife.
Public Debts Act 1663 (repealed)	1663 c. 74 —	8 October 1663
Act suspending execution upon publict debts until the next session of Parliament. Act suspending execution upon public debts until the next session of Parliament. (Repealed by Statute Law Revision (Scotland) Act 1906 (6 Edw. 7. c. 38))
Not public and general	1663 c. 75 —	8 October 1663
Act granting to William Earl of Lothian (Note: William Kerr, 1st Earl of Lothian.) the benefit of a Review of some decreits given against him by the English Judges. Act granting to William, Earl of Lothian, the benefit of a Review of some judgments given against him by the English Judges.
Not public and general	1663 c. 76 —	8 October 1663
Act and Remit to the Lords of Session of the bussines betuixt Johne Earle of Cassills (Note: John Kennedy, 6th Earl of Cassilis.) and Sir Archibald Stirling of Carden. (Note: Archibald Stirling, Lord Garden.); Act and Remit to the Lords of Session of the business between John, Earl of Cassilis, and Sir Archibald Stirling of Garden.
Excommunication Act 1663 (repealed)	1663 c. 77; 1663 c. 23	8 October 1663
Act Rescinding a Proviso in the 25 Act (Note: Excommunication Act 1661 (c. 238)) of the first session of Parliament Anent Sentences of Excommunication. Act Rescinding a Proviso in the 25th Act of the first session of Parliament, Regarding Sentences of Excommunication. (Repealed by Statute Law Repeal (No. 3) Act 1690 (c. 58))
Not public and general	1663 c. 78 —	8 October 1663
Act in favours of David Boyll of Kelburn for a voluntar contribution for repareing the harbour of Kelburn. Act in favour of David Boyle of Kelburn, for a voluntary contribution for repairing the harbour of Kelburn.
Not public and general	1663 c. 79 —	8 October 1663
Act in favours of Sir James Murray for a yeerlie fair and weekly mercat at Skirling. Act in favour of Sir James Murray, for a fair and weekly market at Skirling.
Not public and general	1663 c. 80 —	8 October 1663
Act in favours of Alexr Urquhart of Kinudie for a weeklie mercat and yeirlie fair at Eister Kinudie. Act in favour of Alexander Urquhart of Kinnudie, for a weekly market and a yearly fair at Easter Kinnudie.
King's Prerogative Act 1663 (repealed)	1663 c. 81; 1663 c. 4	9 October 1663
Act asserting his Majesties prerogative in the ordering & disposall of trade with forraigners. Act asserting his Majesty's prerogative in the ordering and disposal of trade with foreigners. (Repealed by King's Prerogative Act 1701 (c. 7))
Penal Statutes Act 1663 (repealed)	1663 c. 82; 1663 c. 27	9 October 1663
Act anent penall Statuts. Act anent penal Statutes. (Repealed by Statute Law Revision (Scotland) Act 1906 (6 Edw. 7. c. 38))
Justices of the Peace Act 1663 (repealed)	1663 c. 83; 1663 c. 29	9 October 1663
Act for renewing the Justices of Peace. Act for renewing the Justices of Peace. (Repealed by Statute Law Revision (Scotland) Act 1906 (6 Edw. 7. c. 38))
Not public and general	1663 c. 84 —	9 October 1663
Ratification in favours of Sir Andrew Aitoun of Kinglassie of the lands and tennendrie of Kinglassie. Ratification in favour of Sir Andrew Ayton of Kinglassie, of the lands and tenandry of Kinglassie.
Not public and general	1663 c. 85 —	9 October 1663
Ratification of a contract of wodset betuixt the Lords of Session and the Magistrats and Council of Edinburgh. Ratification of a contract of wadset between the Lords of Session and the Magistrates and Council of Edinburgh.
Not public and general	1663 c. 86 —	9 October 1663
Ratification of ane contract betuixt the Magistrats and Council of Aberbrothock and David Johnstoun alias Souter of Wardmilne. Ratification of a contract between the Magistrates and Council of Arbroath, and David Johnston, alias Souter, of Wardmill.
Not public and general	1663 c. 87 —	9 October 1663
Ratification in favours of M^{r} Alexander Foulis of Ratho of the lands of Ratho. Ratification in favour of Mr Alexander Foulis of Ratho, of the lands of Ratho.
Not public and general	1663 c. 88 —	9 October 1663
Ratification in favours of Sir Robert Sinclair of Stevenstoun of the lands of Stevenstoun. Ratification in favour of Sir Robert Sinclair of Stevenston, of the lands of Stevenston.
Not public and general	1663 c. 89 —	9 October 1663
Ratification in favours of Mr Robert Sinclair of Longformacus of the lands of Longformacus. Ratification in favour of Mr Robert Sinclair of Longformacus of the lands of Longformacus.
Not public and general	1663 c. 90 —	9 October 1663
Ratification in favours of Thomas Hammilton of Bathgate of the Lands and Barony of Bathgate. Ratification in favour of Thomas Hamilton of Bathgate, of the Lands and Barony of Bathgate.
Not public and general	1663 c. 91 —	9 October 1663
Ratification in favours of Michaell Balfour of Pitmedden of the lands of Randerstoun &c. Ratification in favour of Michael Balfour of Pitmedden of the lands of Randerstone, etc.
Not public and general	1663 c. 92 —	9 October 1663
Ratification in favours of William Prestoun of Valeyfeild of the toun and lands of Valeyfeild. Ratification in favour of William Preston of Valleyfield, of the town and lands of Valleyfield.
Not public and general	1663 c. 93 —	9 October 1663
Ratification in favours of James Campbell Writer to the Signet and his son of the Lands of Gargunnock &c. Ratification in favour of James Campbell, Writer to the Signet, and his son, of the Lands of Gargunnock, etc.
Not public and general	1663 c. 94 —	9 October 1663
Ratification in favours of John Malcolme of Balbedie of the Lands & Barrony of Balbedie. Ratification in favour of John Malcolm of Balbedie, of the Lands and Barony of Balbedie.
Not public and general	1663 c. 95 —	9 October 1663
Ratification of a mortification in favours of the Presbetrie of Pearth made by Mr William Bell Minister at Errol. Ratification of a mortification in favour of the Presbytery of Perth, made by Mr William Bell, Minister at Erroll.
Not public and general	1663 c. 96 —	9 October 1663
Ratification in favours of George Home of Cames of the lands of Cames &c. Ratification in favour of George Home of Kaimes, of the lands of Kaimes, etc.
Not public and general	1663 c. 97 —	9 October 1663
Ratification in favours of the burgh of Whithorne of their Charters and Infeftments. Ratification in favour of the burgh of Whithorn, of the Charters and Infestments.
Not public and general	1663 c. 98 —	9 October 1663
Ratification in favours of Sir John Gibsone of Pentland and M_{r} Alex^{r} Gibson his son of the Lands and Barony of Pentland &c. Ratification in favour of Sir John Gibson of Pentland, and Mr Alexander Gibson, his son, of the Lands and Barony of Pentland, etc.
Not public and general	1663 c. 99 —	9 October 1663
Ratification in favours of Johne Earle of Rothes (Note: John Leslie, 1st Duke of Rothes.) &c. his Majesties heigh Commissioner of the title and dignitie of Earle of Rothes Lord Leslie &c. Ratification in favour of John, Earl of Rothes etc., his Majesty's high Commissioner, of the title and dignity of Earl of Rothes, Lord Leslie, etc.
Not public and general	1663 c. 100 —	9 October 1663
Ratification in favours of Sir John Home of Renton Justice Clerk of the Lands and Barony of Rentoun. Ratification in favour of Sir John Home of Renton, Justice Clerk, of the Lands and Barony of Renton.
Not public and general	1663 c. 101 —	9 October 1663
Ratification in favours of William Scot of Ardross of the Lands and Barony of Ardross. Ratification in favour of William Scott of Ardross, of the Lands and Barony of Ardross.
Not public and general	1663 c. 102 —	9 October 1663
Ratification in favours of the burgh of Edinburgh of their rights to the Citiedale of Leith. Ratification in favour of the burgh of Edinburgh, of their rights to the Citadel of Leith.
Not public and general	1663 c. 103 —	9 October 1663
Ratification in favours of Captane Walter Lockhart of Kirktoun of the Lands of Kirktoun &c. Ratification in favour of Captain Walter Lockhart of Kirkton, of the Lands of Kirkton, etc.
Not public and general	1663 c. 104 —	9 October 1663
Ratification in favours of Sir Archibald Cockburn of Langtoun of the lands and barronie of Langtoun &c. Ratification in favour of Sir Archibald Cockburn of Langton, of the lands and barony of Langton, etc.
Not public and general	1663 c. 105 —	9 October 1663
Ratification in favours of Charles Maitland (Note: Charles Maitland, 3rd Earl of Lauderdale.) son to wmquhill John Earle of Lauderdaill (Note: John Maitland, 1st Earl of Lauderdale.) of the lands of Nortoun &c. Ratification in favour of Charles Maitland, son to the late John, Earl of Lauderdale, of the lands of Norton, etc.
Not public and general	1663 c. 106 —	9 October 1663
Ratification in favours of Mr Robert Prestoun of Prestoun and Johne Prestoun his son of the Lands and Barony of Prestoun. Ratification in favour of Mr Robert Preston and John Preston his son, of the Lands and Barony of Preston.
Not public and general	1663 c. 107 —	9 October 1663
Ratification in favours of Charles Earle of Dumfermling (Note: Charles Seton, 2nd Earl of Dunfermline.) of the grant of the Lordship and Regality of Dumfermling. Ratification in favour of Charles, Earl of Dunfermline, of the tack of the Lordship and Regality of Dunfermline.
Not public and general	1663 c. 108 —	9 October 1663
Ratification in favours of Johne Earle of Crafford (Note: John Lindsay, 17th Earl of Crawford.) and Johne Earle of Lauderdale (Note: John Maitland, 1st Duke of Lauderdale.) of their gifts of mynes and mineralls. Ratification in favour of John, Earl of Crawford and John, Earl of Lauderdale, of their gifts of mines and minerals.
Not public and general	1663 c. 109 —	9 October 1663
Ratification in favours of William Lord Parbroth (Note: William Lindsay, 18th Earl of Crawford.) and Lindesay of Wauchope of their gifts of mines and mineralls. Ratification in favour of William, lord Parbroath and Lindsay of Wauchope of their gifts of mines and minerals.
Not public and general	1663 c. 110 —	9 October 1663
Ratification in favours of Charles Maitland of Haltoun and William Scott of Ardross of their gifts of mines and mineralls. Ratification in favour of Charles Maitland of Hatton and William Scott of Ardross of their gifts of mines and minerals.
Not public and general	1663 c. 111 —	9 October 1663
Ratification in favours of Collonell Lodoweik Lesley and Collonell James Scott of their gifts of mines and mineralls. Ratification in favour of Colonel Ludovic Leslie and Colonel James Scott of their gifts of mines and minerals.
Not public and general	1663 c. 112 —	9 October 1663
Ratification in favours of James Dikson of Stane of the superiority of the lands of Stane. Ratification in favour of James Dickson of Stane, of the superiority of the lands of Stane.
Saving the Rights Act 1663 Not public and general	1663 c. 113; 1663 c. 30	9 October 1663
Act Salvo Jure cujuslibet. Act Salvo Jure cujuslibet.

=== Sources ===
- Alexander, William (1841). "Acta Parliamentorum Regis Caroli Secundi". An Abridgement of the Acts of the Parliaments of Scotland. Edinburgh: Adam and Charles Black. pp. A57 – A59 – via Google Books.
- Alexander, William (1841). "Acta Parliamentorum Regis Caroli Secundi". An Abridgement of the Acts of the Parliaments of Scotland. Edinburgh: Adam and Charles Black. pp. A57 – A59 – via Google Books.
- Chronological Table of the Statutes. London: Her Majesty's Stationery Office. 1972. pp. 1353–1354 – via Google Books.
- "Acts of the Old Scottish Parliament: 1663". legislation.gov.uk. The National Archives.
- "Index of Statutes: Index of Statutes: Charles II (1649-1685)". Records of the Parliaments of Scotland to 1707. University of St Andrews.

== See also ==
- List of legislation in the United Kingdom
- Records of the Parliaments of Scotland
