= Betting and Gaming Duties Act 1972 =

Act of the Parliament of the United Kingdom

Betting and Gaming Duties Act 1972 (Note: Section 30(1).)
- Act of Parliament
- Parliament of the United Kingdom
- Long title: An Act to consolidate certain enactments concerning the duties of excise relating to betting and gaming.
- Citation: 1972 c. 25
- Territorial extent: England and Wales; Scotland; (Note: Section 30(4).)

Dates
- Royal assent: 11 May 1972
- Commencement: 11 June 1972 (Note: Section 30(3).)
- Repealed: 30 October 1981
Other legislation
Amends	See § Repealed enactments
Repeals/revokes	See § Repealed enactments
Amended by	Statute Law (Repeals) Act 1974; Customs and Excise Management Act 1979
Repealed by	Betting and Gaming Duties Act 1981

Status: Repealed

Text of statute as originally enacted

The Betting and Gaming Duties Act 1972 (c. 25) was an act of the Parliament of the United Kingdom that consolidated enactments concerning the duties of excise relating to betting and gaming in Great Britain.

== Provisions ==
=== Repealed enactments ===
Section 29(2) of the act repealed 9 enactments, listed in schedule 7 to the act.

Citation	Short title	Extent of repeal
1963 c. 3	Betting Duties Act 1963	The whole act.
1964 c. 49	Finance Act 1964	In section 7, subsections (2) to (4).
1966 c. 18	Finance Act 1966	Section 12, except subsection (6).
1967 c. 54	Finance Act 1967	Section 15, except subsection (5).
1968 c. 44	Finance Act 1968	Schedule 3, except paragraph 6.
1968 c. 44	Finance Act 1968	Section 7, except subsection (8).
1968 c. 44	Finance Act 1968	In section 4, subsections (2) and (4).
1968 c. 65	Gaming Act 1968	Schedule 5.
1968 c. 65	Gaming Act 1968	In Schedule 2, in each of paragraphs 20(f) and 60(c), the words "under section 3 of the Finance Act 1969".
1968 c. 65	Gaming Act 1968	In Schedule 3, in paragraph 9(f), the words "under section 3 of the Finance Act 1969".
1968 c. 65	Gaming Act 1968	In Schedule 4, in paragraph 11(f), the words "under section 3 of the Finance Act 1969".
1968 c. 65	Gaming Act 1968	In Schedule 11, in Part II, the entry relating to section 3(6) of the Betting Duties Act 1963 and the entry relating to section 15(6) of the Finance Act 1966.
1969 c. 32	Finance Act 1969	Section 3, except subsections (8) and (9).
1969 c. 32	Finance Act 1969	Section 5, except subsection (17).
1969 c. 32	Finance Act 1969	In Schedule 9, paragraphs 1 to 21, and in paragraphs 22, 23 and 24 the words "under section 3 of the Finance Act 1969" wherever they occur.
1969 c. 32	Finance Act 1969	Schedule 11.
1970 c. 24	Finance Act 1970	In section 1, subsections (1) to (4).
1970 c. 24	Finance Act 1970	Section 2, except subsection (9).
1970 c. 24	Finance Act 1970	Section 3.
1970 c. 24	Finance Act 1970	Schedule 1, except paragraphs 14 and 16(2) and (3).
1971 c. 68	Finance Act 1971	Sections 8 to 10.
1971 c. 68	Finance Act 1971	In section 69(3), the words "8, 9, 10".

== Subsequent developments ==
The whole act was repealed by section 34(2) of, and schedule 7 to, the Betting and Gaming Duties Act 1981, which came into force on 30 October 1981.
