= British International Investment =

Development finance institution owned by the British government

British International Investment plc
- Type: Government-owned public limited company
- Industry: Development finance institution
- Founded: 1948; 78 years ago
- Headquarters: London, United Kingdom
- Products: Invests equity and debt directly and through funds.
- Website: bii.co.uk

British International Investment plc, (formerly CDC Group plc, Commonwealth Development Corporation, and Colonial Development Corporation) is the development finance institution of the UK government. The Foreign, Commonwealth and Development Office is responsible for the organisation, and is the sole shareholder. It has an investment portfolio valued around US$7.1 billion (year-end 2020) and since 2011 is focused on the emerging markets of South Asia and Africa via its direct investment and cooperation with important global stakeholders such as Standard Chartered.

== History ==
=== Formation ===
The original Colonial Development Corporation was established as a statutory corporation in 1948 by Clement Attlee's post-war Labour government, to assist British colonies in the development of agriculture. Following the independence of many colonies, it was renamed the Commonwealth Development Corporation in 1963 and was permitted to invest outside the Commonwealth in 1969.

Commonwealth Development Corporation Act 1999 (Note: Section 28(1).)
- Act of Parliament
- Parliament of the United Kingdom
- Long title: An Act to make provision about the Commonwealth Development Corporation.
- Citation: 1999 c. 20
- Territorial extent: United Kingdom (Note: Section 28(2).)

Dates
- Royal assent: 27 July 1999
- Commencement: 27 July 1999 (Note: Section 4(b) of the Interpretation Act 1978.)
Other legislation
Amends	Superannuation Act 1972; House of Commons Disqualification Act 1975; Northern Ireland Assembly Disqualification Act 1975; Commonwealth Development Corporation Act 1978; Overseas Development and Co-operation Act 1980; Miscellaneous Financial Provisions Act 1983
Repeals/revokes	Commonwealth Development Corporation Act 1982; Commonwealth Development Corporation Act 1986; Commonwealth Development Corporation Act 1995; Commonwealth Development Corporation Act 1996
Amended by	Companies Act 2006 (Consequential Amendments etc) Order 2008; Companies Act 2006 (Consequential Amendments, Transitional Provisions and Savings) Order 2009; Commonwealth Development Corporation Act 2017; Commonwealth Development Corporation (Limit on Government Assistance) Regulations 2023

Status: Amended

Text of statute as originally enacted

Revised text of statute as amended

As part of the Commonwealth Development Corporation Act 1999 (c. 20), CDC was converted from a statutory corporation to a public limited company renamed CDC Group plc, with all shares owned by the UK Government.

=== Actis spin-out ===
In July 2004 CDC spun out an emerging markets private equity fund manager, Actis Capital, with a 60% stake sold to the management team. CDC remained an active sponsor of Actis's investment activities, committing the equivalent of 650 million US dollars to the firm's third fund. Following its reorganisation, CDC ceased making direct investments and became purely a fund of funds investment company. During this period it grew in value from £1.2 billion to £2.8 billion, investing in almost 1000 businesses in 70 developing countries. These businesses employed almost a million people and paid over US$3 billion a year in taxes.

=== Criticisms of CDC ===
CDC was the subject of extensive investigations by the magazine Private Eye, which devoted seven pages to criticising the organization in September 2010. Amongst other allegations, it claimed that CDC had moved away from financing beneficial international development towards seeking large profits from schemes that enriched CDC's managers while bringing little or no benefit to the poor; and that when Actis was spun out it was given an "implausibly low valuation". The Actis deal was also the subject of criticism by British politicians.

=== Review and reform ===
On 12 October 2010, the Secretary of State for International Development, Andrew Mitchell announced to Parliament that the British Government was to reconfigure CDC, saying that whilst he applauded its financial success, it had also "become less directly engaged in serving the needs of development". On 22 October 2010 the International Development Committee announced that it was to conduct an inquiry into CDC to examine issues such as its effectiveness and possible reforms, including its abolition. Their report was published on 3 March 2011 with the government's response delivered on 18 May 2011. In 2011 CDC implemented a new business plan, focusing its investments on the poorer countries of South Asia and sub-Saharan Africa, as well as once again providing direct investments to businesses alongside its fund of funds model.

=== 2021 rename ===
In November 2021, the FCDO announced that it would rebrand the CDC as British International Investment (BII) in 2022 as part of a strategy to deepen economic, security and development ties globally, increasing its financing to 9 billion pounds by 2025. Foreign Secretary Liz Truss said in the announcement the change was to "grow economies across Asia, Africa and the Caribbean while drawing them closer towards free-market democracies and building a network of liberty across the world". A group of NGOs and trade unions criticised the change as part of a move to "repurpose BII as an institution that focuses solely on private-sector investment and profit-making, rather than development goals and poverty reduction", and as part of offering an alternative to foreign partners to loans from China.

== See also ==
- Development Finance Institution
- Actis Capital
- Crown Agents
- UK Export Finance
- UK Government Investments
