= Adultery laws =

Adultery laws are the laws in various countries that deal with extramarital sex. Historically, many societies considered extramarital sex to be objectionable on religious and moral grounds and enacted a variety of criminal laws to combat what was termed adultery, some of which were subject to severe punishment, especially in the case of extramarital sex involving a married woman and a man other than her husband, with penalties including capital punishment, mutilation, or torture. Since the 19th century, such punishments have gradually fallen into disfavor, especially in Western countries. In countries where adultery is still a crime, punishments range from fines to caning and even capital punishment. Since the 20th century, criminal laws against adultery have become controversial, with most Western countries repealing them.

Most countries that criminalize adultery are those where the dominant religion is Islam (through enforcement of religious laws), and several sub-Saharan African countries. Notable exceptions to this rule are the Philippines and 17 U.S. states (as well as Puerto Rico) although adultery charges are rare in the United States.

However, even in jurisdictions that have decriminalised adultery, adultery may still have legal consequences, particularly in jurisdictions with fault-based divorce laws, where adultery can constitute a ground for divorce and may be a factor in property settlement, the custody of children, the denial of alimony, etc. Adultery is not a ground for divorce in jurisdictions which have adopted a no-fault divorce model, but may still be a factor in child custody and property disputes.

The criminal status of adultery has attracted criticism, especially where there are violent penalties. The head of the United Nations expert body charged with identifying ways to eliminate laws that discriminate against women or are discriminatory to them in terms of implementation or impact, Kamala Chandrakirana, has stated that: "Adultery must not be classified as a criminal offence at all". A joint statement by the United Nations Working Group on discrimination against women in law and in practice states that: "Adultery as a criminal offence violates women’s human rights".

In Muslim countries that follow Sharia law for criminal justice, the punishment for adultery may be stoning. There are fifteen countries in which stoning is authorized as lawful punishment, though in recent times it has been legally carried out only in Iran and Somalia. Countries which follow very strict versions of Sharia law in their criminal systems include Saudi Arabia, Iran, Brunei, Afghanistan, Sudan, Pakistan, 12 of Nigeria's 36 states (in Northern Nigeria) and Qatar; although these laws are not necessarily enforced. Al-Shabaab, a jihadist fundamentalist group based in East Africa (mainly Somalia) and Yemen also implements an extreme form of Sharia.

== Punishment ==
In jurisdictions where adultery is illegal, punishments vary from fines (for example in the US state of Rhode Island) to caning in parts of Asia. In fifteen countries the punishment includes stoning, although in recent times it has been legally enforced only in Iran and Somalia. Most stoning cases are the result of mob violence, and while technically illegal, no action is usually taken against perpetrators. Sometimes such stonings are ordered by informal village leaders who have de facto power in the community. Adultery may have consequences under civil law even in countries where it is not outlawed by the criminal law. For instance it may constitute fault in countries where the divorce law is fault based or it may be a ground for tort.

In some jurisdictions, the "intruder" (the third party) is punished, rather than the adulterous spouse. For instance act 266 of the Penal Code of South Sudan reads: "Whoever, has consensual sexual intercourse with a man or woman who is and whom he or she has reason to believe to be the spouse of another person, commits the offence of adultery [...]". Similarly, under the adultery law in India (Section 497 of the Indian Penal Code, until overturned by the Supreme Court in 2018) it was a criminal offense for a man to have consensual sexual intercourse with a married woman, without the consent of her husband (no party was criminally punished in case of adultery between a married man and an unmarried woman).

== Asia ==
=== Western Asia ===
Throughout Western Asia, adultery has attracted severe sanctions, including the death penalty. In some places, such as Saudi Arabia, the method of punishment for adultery is stoning to death. Proving adultery under Muslim law can be a very difficult task as it requires the accuser to produce four eyewitnesses to the act of sexual intercourse, each of whom should have a good reputation for truthfulness and honesty. The criminal standards do not apply in the application of social and family consequences of adultery, where the standards of proof are not as exacting. Sandra Mackey, author of The Saudis: Inside the Desert Kingdom, stated in 1987 that in Saudi Arabia, "unlike the tribal rights of a father to put to death a daughter who has violated her chastity, death sentences under Koranic law [for adultery] are extremely rare."

In regions of Iraq and Syria under ISIL, there have been reports of floggings as well as execution of people who engaged in adultery. The method of execution was typically by stoning. ISIL would not merely oppose adultery but also oppose behavior that from their point of view could lead to adultery, such as women not being covered, people of the opposite sex socializing with one another, or even female mannequins in store windows.

In Iraq, adultery remains a criminal offence under Article 377 of the Penal Code, which provides for imprisonment in cases involving a married woman and her partner, as well as for a husband who commits adultery in the marital home.

In Iran, adultery is criminalized as a form of zina under the Islamic Penal Code, with the code providing for severe hadd punishments, including stoning to death in certain circumstances.

=== China ===
In China, punishments for adultery were differentiated based on gender of the spouse until 1935. Adultery is no longer a crime in the People's Republic of China, but is a ground for divorce. It is illegal to commit adultery with the spouse of a servicemember in the People's Liberation Army.

=== India ===
On 27 September 2018, the Supreme Court of India ruled Section 497 of the Indian Penal Code, the law which criminalized adultery, as unconstitutional. Before 2018, adultery was defined as sex between a man and a woman without the consent of the woman's husband. The man was prosecutable and could be sentenced for up to five years (even if he himself was unmarried) whereas the married woman couldn't be jailed. Men have called the law gender discrimination in that women cannot be prosecuted for adultery and the National Commission of Women has criticized the British era law of being anti-feminist as it treats women as the property of their husbands and has consequently recommended deletion of the law or reducing it to a civil offense. Extramarital sex without the consent of one's partner can be a valid grounds for monetary penalty on government employees, as ruled by the Central Administrative Tribunal.

=== Indonesia ===
Indonesia's new Criminal Code, which entered into force in January 2026, criminalizes sexual intercourse outside marriage, although prosecution is limited to complaints by certain close relatives.

=== Japan ===
Adultery was a crime in Japan until 1947.

=== Pakistan ===
In Pakistan, adultery is a crime under the Hudood Ordinance, promulgated in 1979. The Ordinance sets a maximum penalty of death. The Ordinance has been particularly controversial because it requires a woman making an accusation of rape to provide extremely strong evidence to avoid being charged with adultery herself. A conviction for rape is only possible with evidence from no fewer than four witnesses.

=== Afghanistan ===
Under the Taliban authorities, adultery and other extramarital sexual relations are subject to criminal punishment, including imprisonment and flogging, while Taliban authorities have also announced the enforcement of stoning as a punishment for adultery.

=== Philippines ===
Adultery is a crime in the Philippines. In the Philippines, the law differentiates based on the gender of the spouse. A wife can be charged with adultery, while a husband can only be charged with the related crime of concubinage, which is more loosely defined (it requires either keeping the mistress in the family home, or cohabiting with her, or having sexual relations under scandalous circumstances). There are currently proposals to decriminalize adultery in the Philippines.

=== South Korea ===
In 2015, South Korea's Constitutional Court overturned the country's law against adultery. Previously, adultery was criminalized in 1953, and violators were subject to two years in prison, with the aim of protecting women from divorce. The law was overturned because the court found that adultery is a private matter in which the state should not intervene.

=== Taiwan ===
In Taiwan, adultery was a criminal offense before 2020. The law was challenged in 2002 when it was upheld by the Constitutional Court. Arguments were heard again by the court in March 2020, and the court ruled the law unconstitutional on 29 May 2020. Twelve of fifteen justices issued a concurring opinion, two others concurred in part, and one dissented. The Legislative Yuan amended the Criminal Code on 31 May 2021, removing the article criminalizing adultery entirely.

During Qing rule in Taiwan (1683 to 1895), the husband or his relatives could bring charges. The standard sentence was ninety lashes for each of the accused. The woman could be sold or divorced. The matter could be settled out of court, with bodily harm to the accused or assorted punishments affecting his social standing. Under Japanese rule, only the husband could bring charges. The accused could be sentenced to two years imprisonment. Wife selling became illegal, although private settlements still occurred.

== Europe ==
Adultery is no longer a crime in any European country.

Adultery in English law was not a criminal offence in secular law from the later twelfth century until the seventeenth century. It was punishable under ecclesiastical law from the twelfth century until jurisdiction over adultery by ecclesiastical courts in England and Wales was abolished in England and Wales (and some British territories of the British Empire) by the Matrimonial Causes Act 1857. However, in English and Welsh common law of tort it was possible from the early seventeenth century for a spouse to prosecute an adulterer for damages on the grounds of loss of consortium until the Law Reform (Miscellaneous Provisions) Act 1970. Adultery was also illegal under secular statute law for the decade in which the Commonwealth (Adultery) Act (1650) was in force.

Among the last European countries to decriminalise adultery were Italy (1969), West Germany (1969), Malta (1973), Luxembourg (1974), France (1975), Spain (1978), Portugal (1982), Greece (1983), Belgium (1987), Switzerland (1989), and Austria (1997).

In Romania adultery was a crime until 2006, though the crime of adultery had a narrow definition, excluding situations where the other spouse encouraged the act or when the act happened at a time the couple was living separate and apart; and in practice prosecutions were extremely rare.

In Turkey, adultery laws were held to be invalid in 1996/1998 because the law was deemed discriminatory as it differentiated between women and men. In 2004, there were proposals to introduce a gender-neutral adultery law. The plans were dropped, and it has been suggested that the objections from the European Union played a role.

Before the 20th century, adultery was often punished harshly. In Scandinavia, in the 17th century, adultery and bigamy were subject to the death penalty, although few people were actually executed. Examples of women who have been executed for adultery in Medieval and Early Modern Europe include Maria of Brabant, Duchess of Bavaria (in 1256), Agnese Visconti (in 1391), Beatrice Lascaris di Tenda (in 1418), Anne Boleyn (in 1536), and Catherine Howard (in 1542). The enforcement of adultery laws varied by jurisdiction. In England, the last execution for adultery is believed to have taken place in 1654, when a woman named Susan Bounty was hanged.

The European Court of Human Rights (ECHR) has had the opportunity to rule in recent years on several cases involving the legitimacy of firing a person from their job due to adultery. These cases dealt with people working for religious organizations and raised the question of the balancing of the right of a person to respect for their private life (recognized in the EU) and the right of religious communities to be protected against undue interference by the State (recognized also in the EU). These situations must be analyzed with regard to their specific circumstances, in each case. The ECtHR had ruled both in favor of the religious organization (in the case of Obst) and in favor of the fired person (in the case of Schüth).

== Latin America ==
Until the 1990s, most Latin American countries had laws against adultery. Adultery has been decriminalized in most of these countries, including Paraguay (1990), Chile (1994), Argentina (1995), Nicaragua (1996), Dominican Republic (1997), Brazil (2005), and Haiti (2005). In some countries, adultery laws have been struck down by courts on the ground that they discriminated against women, such as Guatemala (1996), where the Guatemalan Constitutional Court struck down the adultery law based both on the Constitution's gender equality clause and on human rights treaties including CEDAW; and Venezuela in 2016. The adultery law of the Federal Criminal Code of Mexico was repealed in 2011.

== Oceania ==
=== Australia ===
Adultery is not a crime in Australia. Under federal law enacted in 1994, sexual conduct between consenting adults (18 years of age or older) is their private matter throughout Australia, irrespective of marital status. Australian states and territories had previously repealed their respective adultery criminal laws. Australia changed to no-fault divorce in 1975, abolishing adultery as a ground for divorce.

=== New Zealand ===
In New Zealand law, divorce is no-fault and adultery is not a crime.

== Canada ==
Adultery is not a crime in Canada. It has never been defined as a criminal offence within the Criminal Code, which was enacted in 1892, nor is it considered an offence at common law.

== United States ==
Legality and decriminalization of adultery in the United States Adultery is a felony Adultery is a misdemeanor Adultery decriminalized between 2010 and the present Adultery decriminalized between 1990 and 2010 Adultery decriminalized before 1990 Adultery never criminalized, or unknown date of decriminalization

The United States is one of few industrialized countries to have laws criminalizing adultery still in the lawbooks of some states. However, such laws are hardly, if ever, enforced. In the United States, laws vary from state to state. Until the mid-20th century, most U.S. states (especially Southern and Northeastern states) had laws against fornication, adultery or cohabitation. These laws have gradually been abolished or struck down by courts as unconstitutional.

State criminal laws against adultery are rarely enforced. Federal appeals courts have ruled inconsistently as to whether these laws are unconstitutional (especially after the 2003 Supreme Court decision Lawrence v. Texas) and as of 2019 the Supreme Court has not ruled directly on the issue.

As of 22 November 2024, adultery remains a crime in 16 states and the Commonwealth of Puerto Rico but prosecutions are rare. Pennsylvania abolished its fornication and adultery laws in 1973. States which have decriminalised adultery in recent years include West Virginia (2010), Colorado (2013), New Hampshire (2014), Massachusetts (2018), Utah (2019), Idaho (2022), Minnesota (2023), and New York (2024). The District of Columbia repealed its adultery law in 2003. When passing the District of Columbia Organic Act of 1801, the 6th United States Congress extended all of the criminal laws of Maryland and Virginia to the respective territory within the District that each state had ceded to the federal government under Article I, Section VIII, and adultery had been an indictable offense in Maryland since the passage of a provincial law in 1715.

The last conviction for adultery in Massachusetts was in 1983 and held that the statute was constitutional and that "no fundamental personal privacy right implicit in the concept of ordered liberty guaranteed by the United States Constitution bars the criminal prosecution of such persons [adulterers]."

In general, 3 US states criminalize it as a felony (Oklahoma, Michigan, and Wisconsin) and 13 states along with Puerto Rico criminalize it as a misdemeanor. Punishments range from as little as a $10 fine in Maryland (despite being technically a criminal offense, not a civil one) to a fine of up to $10,000 and jail time of up to 3.5 years in Wisconsin and a fine of up to $5,000 and jail time of up to 5 years in Michigan.

List of the statutes:

- Alabama (Alabama Revised Statutes, § 13a-13-2)
- Arizona (Arizona Revised Statutes, § 13–1408)
- Florida (Florida Statutes, § 798.01)
- Georgia (Official Code of Georgia Annotated, § 16–6–19)
- Illinois (Illinois Compiled Statutes, § 720-5-11/35)
- Kansas (Kansas Statutes Annotated, § 21–5511)
- Maryland (Annotated Code of Maryland, § 10–5–501)
- Michigan (Michigan Compiled Laws, §§ 750.29-750.32)
- Mississippi (Unannotated Mississippi Code, § 97–29–1)
- North Carolina (North Carolina General Statutes, § 14–26–184)
- North Dakota (North Dakota Century Code, § 12.1-20-09)
- Oklahoma (Oklahoma Statutes Annotated, §§ 21–871–872)
- Rhode Island (Rhode Island General Laws, § 11–6–2)
- South Carolina (South Carolina Code of Laws, §§ 16-15-60-16-15-80)
- Virginia (Virginia Code Annotated, § 18–2–365)
- Wisconsin (Wisconsin Statutes, § 944.16)
- Puerto Rico (Puerto Rico Laws, § 33–4758)

2 of these statutes (of Mississippi and North Carolina) refer to fornication as well and thus also by definition ban any extramarital sex altogether.

1 of these statutes (of Michigan) considers cohabitation between ex-spouses after their divorce as falling under the crime of adultery.

Below is the list of the specific anti-fornication statutes (in states where there's an offense of fornication and where it's a separate offence):

- Georgia (Official Code of Georgia Annotated, § 16–6–18)
- Illinois (Illinois Compiled Statutes, § 720-5/11-40)
- North Dakota (North Dakota Century Code, § 12.1-20-08) (note: even though the crime is called "fornication", it only refers to having sex with minors or having sex in public. It doesn't target private consensual sex between adults, so in practice this law is irrelevant; it's only listed here for the sake of completeness because the crime is called "fornication" under the North Dakotan law)

Below is the list of the specific anti-cohabitation statutes (in states where there's an offense of cohabitation and where it's a separate offence):

- Massachusetts (Massachusetts General Laws, § 208–40) (note: criminalizes cohabitation between 2 ex-spouses after divorce as adultery. But since the Massachusettsan criminal anti-adultery statute was repealed in 2018 and there's no punishment for it anymore, in practice this law is an irrelevant legislative remnant with no function)
- Oklahoma (Oklahoma Statutes Annotated, § 43–123) (criminalizes cohabitation between 2 ex-spouses after divorce as adultery)
- Mississippi (Unannotated Mississippi Code, § 93–5–29) (criminalizes cohabitation between 2 ex-spouses after divorce as adultery)

In the U.S. military, adultery is a potential court-martial offense, falling under the General article (Art. 134). The Manual for Courts-Martial defines (para. 99) "Extramarital sexual conduct" as being: "Elements.(1) That the accused wrongfully engaged in extramarital conduct as described in subparagraph c.(2) with a certain person; (2) That, at the time, the accused knew that the accused or the other person was married to someone else; and (3) That, under the circumstances, the conduct of the accused was either: (i) to the prejudice of good order and discipline in the armed forces; (ii) was of a nature to bring discredit upon the armed forces; or (iii) to the prejudice of good order and discipline in the armed forces and of a nature to bring discredit upon the armed forces". As such, extramarital sex is not automatically an offense, it must be conducted under such circumstances that it is prejudicial to the armed forces. The law on adultery was revised in 2019 in order to include same-sex encounters in the offense.

The enforceability of adultery laws in the United States is unclear following Supreme Court decisions since 1965 relating to privacy and sexual intimacy of consenting adults. However, occasional prosecutions do occur.

Six U.S. states (Hawaii, North Carolina, Mississippi, New Mexico, South Dakota, and Utah) allow the possibility of the tort action of alienation of affections (brought by a deserted spouse against a third party alleged to be responsible for the failure of the marriage). In a highly publicized case in 2010, a woman in North Carolina won a $9 million suit against her husband's mistress.

Laws against adultery in colonial America were very harsh. Despite this, there is only one known execution for adultery in American history: it occurred in the Colony of Massachusetts in 1643, when the married 18 year old Mary Latham and her extramarital lover James Britton were executed.

== Criticism of adultery laws ==
=== Political arguments ===
Laws against adultery have been named as invasive and incompatible with principles of limited government (see Dennis J. Baker, The Right Not to be Criminalized: Demarcating Criminal Law's Authority (Ashgate) chapter 2). Much of the criticism comes from libertarianism, the consensus among whose adherents is that government must not intrude into daily personal lives and that such disputes are to be settled privately rather than prosecuted and penalized by public entities. It is also argued that adultery laws are rooted in religious doctrines; which should not be the case for laws in a secular state.

Opponents of adultery laws regard them as painfully archaic, believing they represent sanctions reminiscent of nineteenth-century novels. They further object to the legislation of morality, especially a morality so steeped in religious doctrine. Support for the preservation of the adultery laws comes from religious groups and from political parties who feel quite independent of morality, that the government has reason to concern itself with the consensual sexual activity of its citizens … The crucial question is: when, if ever, is the government justified to interfere in consensual bedroom affairs?

=== Discrimination against women ===
Opponents of adultery laws argue that these laws maintain social norms which justify violence, discrimination and oppression of women; in the form of state-sanctioned forms of violence such as stoning, flogging or hanging for adultery; or in the form of individual acts of violence committed against women by husbands or relatives, including honor killings, crimes of passion, and beatings. UN Women has called for the decriminalization of adultery. A Joint Statement by the United Nations Working Group on discrimination against women in law and in practice in 2012 stated:

The United Nations Working Group on discrimination against women in law and in practice is deeply concerned at the criminalization and penalization of adultery whose enforcement leads to discrimination and violence against women.

Concerns exist that the existence of "adultery" as a criminal offense (and even in family law) can affect the criminal justice process in cases of domestic assaults and killings, in particular by mitigating murder to manslaughter, or otherwise proving for partial or complete defenses in case of violence. These concerns have been officially raised by the Council of Europe and the UN in recent years. The Council of Europe Recommendation Rec(2002)5 of the Committee of Ministers to member states on the protection of women against violence states that member states should: (...) "57. preclude adultery as an excuse for violence within the family". UN Women has also stated in regard to the defense of provocation and other similar defenses that "laws should clearly state that these defenses do not include or apply to crimes of 'honour', adultery, or domestic assault or murder."

=== Use of limited resources ===
An argument against the criminal status of adultery is that the resources of the law enforcement are limited, and that they should be used carefully; by investing them in the investigation and prosecution of adultery (which is very difficult) the curbing of serious violent crimes may suffer.

=== Consent as the basis of sexual offenses legislation ===
Human rights organizations have stated that legislation on sexual crimes must be based on consent, and must recognize consent as central, and not trivialize its importance; doing otherwise can lead to legal, social or ethical abuses. Amnesty International, when condemning stoning legislation that targets adultery, among other acts, has referred to "acts which should never be criminalized in the first place, including consensual sexual relations between adults". Salil Shetty, Amnesty International's Secretary General, said: "It is unbelievable that in the twenty-first century some countries are condoning child marriage and marital rape while others are outlawing abortion, sex outside marriage and same-sex sexual activity – even punishable by death." The My Body My Rights campaign has condemned state control over individual sexual and reproductive decisions; stating "All over the world, people are coerced, criminalized and discriminated against, simply for making choices about their bodies and their lives".
