= Matrimonial Causes Act =

Stock short title used for UK legislation

"Matrimonial Causes Act" is a stock short title used for legislation in the United Kingdom relating to marriage law.

== List ==
- The Matrimonial Causes Act 1857 (20 & 21 Vict. c. 85)
- The Matrimonial Causes Act 1858 (21 & 22 Vict. c. 108)
- The Matrimonial Causes Act 1859 (22 & 23 Vict. c. 61)
- The Matrimonial Causes Act 1860 (23 & 24 Vict. c. 144)
  - extended by the Perpetuation of Matrimonial Causes Act 1860 Act 1862 (25 & 26 Vict. c. 81)
- The Matrimonial Causes Act 1864 (27 & 28 Vict. c. 44)
- The Matrimonial Causes Act 1866 (29 & 30 Vict. c. 32)
- The Matrimonial Causes and Marriage Law (Ireland) Amendment Act 1870 (33 & 34 Vict. c. 110)
- The Matrimonial Causes and Marriage Law (Ireland) Amendment Act 1871 (34 & 35 Vict. c. 49)
- The Matrimonial Causes Act 1873 (36 & 37 Vict. c. 31)
- The Matrimonial Causes Act 1878 (41 & 42 Vict. c. 19)
- The Matrimonial Causes Act 1884 (47 & 48 Vict. c. 68)
- The Matrimonial Causes Act 1907 (7 Edw. 7. c. 12)
- The Matrimonial Causes (Dominions Troops) Act 1919 (9 & 10 Geo. 5. c. 28)
- The Matrimonial Causes Act 1923 (13 & 14 Geo. 5. c. 19)
- The Matrimonial Causes Act 1937 (1 Edw. 8. & 1 Geo. 6. c. 57)
- The Matrimonial Causes Act (Northern Ireland) 1939 (3 & 4 Geo. 6. c. 13 (N.I.))
- The Matrimonial Causes (War Marriages) Act 1944 (7 & 8 Geo. 6. c. 43)
- The Matrimonial Causes Act 1950 (14 Geo. 6. c. 25)
- The Matrimonial Causes (Property and Maintenance) Act 1958 (6 & 7 Eliz. 2. c. 35)
- The Matrimonial Causes Act 1963 (c. 45)
- The Matrimonial Causes Act 1965 (c. 72)
- The Matrimonial Causes (Reports) Act (Northern Ireland) 1966 (c. 29 (N.I.))
- The Matrimonial Causes Act 1967 (c. 56)
- The Matrimonial Causes Act 1973 (c. 18)

The Matrimonial Causes Acts 1857 to 1878 was the collective title of the following Acts:

- The Matrimonial Causes Act 1857 (20 & 21 Vict. c. 85)
- The Matrimonial Causes Act 1858 (21 & 22 Vict. c. 108)
- The Matrimonial Causes Act 1859 (22 & 23 Vict. c. 61)
- The Matrimonial Causes Act 1860 (23 & 24 Vict. c. 144)
- The Matrimonial Causes Act 1866 (29 & 30 Vict. c. 32)
- The Divorce Amendment Act 1868 (31 & 32 Vict. c. 77)
- The Matrimonial Causes Act 1873 (36 & 37 Vict. c. 31)
- The Matrimonial Causes Act 1878 (41 & 42 Vict. c. 19)

== See also ==
- List of short titles
