= Matrimonial Proceedings and Property Act 1970 =

Act of the Parliament of the United Kingdom

Matrimonial Proceedings and Property Act 1970 (Note: Section 43(1).)
- Act of Parliament
- Parliament of the United Kingdom
- Long title: An Act to make fresh provision for empowering the court in matrimonial proceedings to make orders ordering either spouse to make financial provision for, or transfer property to, the other spouse or a child of the family, orders for the variation of ante-nuptial and post-nuptial settlements, orders for the custody and education of children and orders varying, discharging or suspending orders made in such proceedings; to make other amendments of the law relating to matrimonial proceedings; to abolish the right to claim restitution of conjugal rights; to declare what interest in property is acquired by a spouse who contributes to its improvement; to make provision as to a spouse's rights of occupation under section 1 of the Matrimonial Homes Act 1967 in certain cases; to extend section 17 of the Married Women's Property Act 1882 and section 7 of the Matrimonial Causes (Property and Maintenance) Act 1958; to amend the law about the property of a person whose marriage is the subject of a decree of judicial separation dying intestate; to abolish the agency of necessity of a wife; and for purposes connected with the matters aforesaid.
- Citation: 1970 c. 45
- Territorial extent: England and Wales (Note: Section 43(4).)

Dates
- Royal assent: 29 May 1970
- Commencement: 1 August 1970 (33, 36–41 and 42(2), so far as it repeals section 20(3) and (4) of the Matrimonial Causes Act 1965; 1 January 1971 (rest of act); (Note: Section 43(2).)

Other legislation
- Amends: Married Women's Property Act 1882; County Courts Act 1959; Matrimonial Proceedings (Magistrates' Courts) Act 1960; Matrimonial Causes Act 1965; Family Provision Act 1966; Matrimonial Homes Act 1967; Maintenance Orders Act 1968; Family Law Reform Act 1969
- Amended by: Law Reform (Miscellaneous Provisions) Act 1970; Maintenance Orders (Reciprocal Enforcement) Act 1972; Matrimonial Causes Act 1973; Inheritance (Provision for Family and Dependants) Act 1975; Statute Law (Repeals) Act 1977; Domestic Proceedings and Magistrates' Courts Act 1978; Matrimonial Homes Act 1983; Crime and Courts Act 2013

Status: Partially repealed

Text of statute as originally enacted

Revised text of statute as amended

Text of the Matrimonial Proceedings and Property Act 1970 as in force today (including any amendments) within the United Kingdom, from legislation.gov.uk.

The Matrimonial Proceedings and Property Act 1970 (c. 45) is an act of the Parliament of the United Kingdom concerning court cases between married people.

== Contents ==
The most important remaining provision is that under section 37 a court has power to vary the shares of equity in a home of a husband and wife to the extent it views to be just.

== Subsequent developments ==
Section 38 of the act was repealed by section 12(2) of, and schedule 3 to, the Matrimonial Homes Act 1983, which came into force on 9 August 1983.

== See also ==
- English land law
- English property law
- Civil Partnership Act 2004 ss 65, 66, 72 and Schs 5-7
