= Tiedeman =

Tiedeman is a surname. Notable people with the surname include:

- George Tiedeman (1861–1935), American politician from Georgia
- May Seaton-Tiedeman (1862–1948), British suffragist
- Sean Tiedeman (born 1972), American film director, producer, and actor
- Tyler Tiedeman (born 1985), American basketball player

== See also ==
- Tiedeman Island, island in Alaska
- Tiedemann Giese (1480–1550), Polish bishop and writer
