= Divorce (Insanity and Desertion) Act 1958 =

Act of the Parliament of the United Kingdom

Divorce (Insanity and Desertion) Act 1958 (Note: Section 4(1).)
- Act of Parliament
- Parliament of the United Kingdom
- Long title: An Act to amend the law as to the circumstances in which, for the purposes of proceedings for divorce in England or Scotland, a person is to be treated as having been continuously under care and treatment and as to the effect of insanity on desertion; and to enable a petition for divorce to be presented on the ground of desertion notwithstanding any separation agreement entered into before desertion became a ground for divorce in English law.
- Citation: 6 & 7 Eliz. 2. c. 54
- Territorial extent: England and Wales; Scotland; (Note: Section 4(2).)

Dates
- Royal assent: 23 July 1958
- Commencement: 23 July 1958 (Note: The Acts of Parliament (Commencement) Act 1793.)
- Repealed: England and Wales: 1 January 1966; Scotland: 1 January 1977
Other legislation
Amends	Divorce (Scotland) Act 1938; Matrimonial Causes Act 1950
Amended by	Statute Law (Repeals) Act 1974
Repealed by	England and Wales: Matrimonial Causes Act 1965; Scotland: Divorce (Scotland) Act 1976
Relates to	Matrimonial Causes Act 1937; Matrimonial Causes Act 1950

Status: Repealed

Text of statute as originally enacted

The Divorce (Insanity and Desertion) Act 1958 (6 & 7 Eliz. 2. c. 54) was an act of the Parliament of the United Kingdom that modified the law relating to divorce to widen the definition of insanity and alleviate any hardships caused by the ability to divorce on the ground of desertion, as introduced in Matrimonial Causes Act 1937. The act was based on the recommendations of Royal Commission on Marriage and Divorce, and was introduced immediately after receiving royal assent on 23 July 1958.

Under divorce law at the time, anybody could receive "relief" if their spouse had been voluntarily treated for mental illness for at least five years. The act amended this section of the Matrimonial Causes Act 1950 to remove the need for this treatment to come after a period of being forcibly detained. Section 2 of the act says that once the desertion begins, the courts may find that it is continuing even if the person who deserted is not capable of continuing to make that decision — for example, if he was insane. This removes the defence of "supervening insanity", as seen in the leading case of Crowther v Crowther.

== Subsequent developments ==
The whole act was repealed for England and Wales by section 45 of, and schedule 2 to, the Matrimonial Causes Act 1965, which came into force on 1 January 1966.

Section 4(3) of the act was repealed by section 1 of, and part XI of the schedule to, the Statute Law (Repeals) Act 1974, which came into force on 27 June 1974.

== Bibliography ==
- Stone, O.M. (1959). "Divorce (Insanity and Desertion) Act, 1958". Modern Law Review. 22 (1). Blackwell Publishing: 61–64. doi:10.1111/j.1468-2230.1959.tb00513.x. ISSN 0026-7961. S2CID 144390750.
