= Adultery in English law =

The history of adultery in English law is a complex topic, including changing understandings of what sexual acts constituted adultery (whereby they sometimes overlap with abduction and rape), unequal treatment of men and women under the law, and competing jurisdictions of secular and ecclesiastical authorities. Prosecution for adultery as such ceased to be possible in English law in 1970.

== Early medieval England ==
Prior to the unification of England in the tenth century, various forms of adultery were punishable in laws codified by Anglo-Saxon kings. These laws defined adultery in terms of damage to men's property, since women were to be under the control of male relatives or, after marriage, their husbands. Compensation payments were linked, as in many other kinds of crime, to the social rank of the offended man, and the laws do not indicate a religious dimension to the conceptualisation of adultery in the law. The probably seventh-century Law of Æthelberht, king of Kent, permitted men to seek compensation or revenge in cases where men had sex with women under their control. Clause 31, for example, reads "if a freeman lies with [another] free-man's wife, he shall pay [the husband] his wergeld and procure a second wife with his own money, and bring her to the other man's home". The ninth-century Laws of Alfred of Wessex include similar provisions, including an explicit statement that it was legal for one man to attack another "if he finds another with his wedded wife, behind closed doors or under the same blanket; or [if he finds another man] with his legitimate daughter (or with his legitimate married sister); or with his mother, if she has been legally married to his father".

Following the unification of England around the early tenth century, English kings promulgated further law-codes that began to conceptualise adultery in terms of Christian sin. These included the law codes of Cnut. Not unlike previous laws, the code specified fines in the case of an adulterous husband, or religious penance in cases viewed as minor (adultery with a slave), but also prescribed corporal mutilation for female adulterers—cutting off their nose and ears—as well as the forfeiture of all the woman's property to her husband. Although Cnut's laws show the influence of Wulfstan, Archbishop of York, it has been argued that this violent punishment of women reflects long-standing custom that had simply not previously been codified rather than religious influence.

== Later medieval England ==
The principle that men might legally kill adulterers found with women under their control persisted following the Norman Conquest in the Leis Willelmi, but the Leges Henrici Primi of around 1114–1118 decreed that the King should have the executive authority to punish an adulterous man, and that adulterous women should be punished by bishops. During the twelfth century, as English common law emerged, the punishment of adultery was shifted from the secular authorities to the ecclesiastical ones. Ecclesiastical authorities did not impose death penalties, but the killing of a male adulterer by a male cuckold was not outlawed in secular law, leaving scope for lawful revenge-killing. In time, however, adultery came exclusively to be a concern of the Church courts, and was not a crime at common law.

There is evidence, however, that local secular courts sometimes exercised judgements in adultery cases; in one thirteenth-century or early fourteenth-century case, for example, a monk was put in the stocks for adultery. Moreover, juries would at times refuse to condemn cuckolds who killed adulterers in flagrante delicto, in practice facilitating the ancient custom of revenge-killing by cuckolds. Meanwhile, although adultery might not be prosecuted in the secular courts per se, adulterous acts might become part of the basis for prosecution for rape or abduction, though by the late fifteenth century such prosecutions had fallen out of use.

== Modern period ==
Ecclesiastical jurisdiction over adultery cases continued from the medieval period until the passage of the Matrimonial Causes Act 1857 brought jurisdiction over marriage, divorce and adultery from the ecclesiastical courts into the secular ones. Ecclesiastical punishments for adultery prior to 1857 involved forms of penance, sometimes public, such as appearing before the parish congregation in a penitential white sheet.

Adultery was outlawed in secular statute law briefly under the Commonwealth of England in the 1650s. Following a long series of attempts to legislate against adultery in Parliament which failed to win the vote, the Rump Parliament passed the Commonwealth (Adultery) Act in May 1650, inter alia imposing the death penalty for adultery, that was defined as sexual intercourse between a married woman and a man other than her husband. Both partners would be liable for death sentence in such case. If a man (married or unmarried) had sex with an unmarried woman (including widow), that would be fornication, punishable only by three months for first offenders (applicable to both partners). However, like all legislation passed by the Commonwealth, the act was repealed following the Restoration of the Monarchy in 1660.

A more lasting change during the early modern period was that it became possible to prosecute for adultery in English common law due to developments in the common-law concept of loss of consortium, which made it possible for a cuckold to bring a civil case against an adulterer under tort law. 'Consortium' in this context means "(the right of) association and fellowship between two married people"; 'loss of consortium' was an act that deprived one spouse (initially only the husband) of the services which the other spouse was expected to provide. In the 1619 case Guy v. Livesey, it is clear that precedent had been established by that time that exclusive access to sexual services was considered to fall within the concept of 'consortium', and that an adulterer might therefore be prosecuted for depriving a cuckold of exclusive access to the sexual services of his wife. From the early eighteenth century, the term for this kind of crime came to be 'criminal conversation' (where 'conversation' is a euphemism for 'sexual intercourse'). Another avenue for prosecuting an adulterer for loss of consortium was to accuse them of 'enticement' (wooing a spouse such that she desired to leave her husband). The possibility of seeking damages against an adulterer in tort law persisted until the passage of the Law Reform (Miscellaneous Provisions) Act 1970.

Adultery also had an important position in English divorce law. The Matrimonial Causes Act 1857 moved litigation from the jurisdiction of the ecclesiastical courts to the civil courts, establishing a model of marriage based on contract rather than sacrament and widening the availability of divorce beyond those who could afford to bring proceedings for annulment or to promote a private Bill. The Act did not treat women's and men's grounds for divorce equally; a husband could petition for divorce on the sole grounds that his wife had committed adultery, whereas a wife could only hope for a divorce based on adultery combined with other offences. The Act also altered the handling of adultery in English law: it abolished the crime of criminal conversation, but maintained the principle that 'since a wife's adultery caused injury to the husband, it entitled him to claim compensation from the adulterer', implying that the wife was the property of the husband – not least because wives could not claim compensation from adulterous husbands. Compensation was no longer, however, paid to the cuckold, but to the court, and damages were not to be punitive or exemplary but purely to compensate a husband's loss of consortium (marital services) of his wife and damages to his reputation, honour, and family life.

After World War I, reforms to divorce law put men and women on a more equal footing. The Matrimonial Causes Act 1923 made adultery a ground of divorce for either spouse (previously, only the man had been able to do this; women had to prove additional fault). The Matrimonial Causes Act 1937 added further grounds for divorce: cruelty, desertion and incurable insanity. The Divorce Reform Act 1969 introduced no-fault divorce based on separation. The divorce law was further liberalized by the Divorce, Dissolution and Separation Act 2020.
