= Matrimonial Homes Act 1967 =

Act of the Parliament of the United Kingdom

Matrimonial Homes Act 1967 (Note: Section 8(1).)
- Act of Parliament
- Parliament of the United Kingdom
- Long title: An Act to amend the law of England and Wales as to the rights of a husband or wife to occupy a dwelling house which has been the matrimonial home; and for connected purposes.
- Citation: 1967 c. 75
- Territorial extent: England and Wales (Note: Section 8(2).)

Dates
- Royal assent: 27 July 1967
- Commencement: 27 July 1967 (Note: The Acts of Parliament (Commencement) Act 1793.)
- Repealed: 1 August 1984
Other legislation
Amends	County Courts Act 1959; Land Charges Act 1925
Amended by	Matrimonial Proceedings and Property Act 1970; Land Charges Act 1972
Repealed by	Matrimonial Homes Act 1983; County Courts Act 1984

Status: Repealed

Text of statute as originally enacted

The Matrimonial Homes Act 1967 (c. 75) was an act of the Parliament of the United Kingdom designed to reverse the House of Lords decision in National Provincial Bank Ltd v Ainsworth [1965] AC 1175, where it ruled that a deserted wife had no right to stay in the family home.

== Background and act ==
Under Lord Denning's decision in Bendall v McWhirter [1952] 2 QB 466, a deserted wife occupying the marital home had a personal licence to stay there. The decision provoked disapproval among the judiciary and from the public; a correspondent wrote:

Dear Sir: You are a disgrace to all mankind to let these women break up homes and expect us chaps to keep them while they rob us of what we have worked for and put us out on the street. I only hope you have the same trouble as us. So do us all a favour and take a Rolls and run off Beachy Head and don't come back.

The House of Lords effectively nullified Denning's work with the case National Provincial Bank Ltd v Ainsworth [1965] AC 1175 in 1965, which ruled that the deserted wife had no licence to stay. The act was primarily aimed at reversing this decision, and to this end it states that where one person has the right to occupy a property and his spouse does not, the spouse can occupy the property if it has been used as the marital home. The spouse can only be evicted with a court order, and the court can grant her the right to occupy the house if she is not in occupation at the time of the desertion. This state of affairs can continue until the marriage ceases to subsist, either by divorce or by the death of the partner with the property right. The act was given royal assent on 27 July 1967.

== Subsequent developments ==
The whole act, except section 2(6) so far as it relates to paragraph 4 of the schedule, was repealed by section 12(2) of, and schedule 3 to, the Matrimonial Homes Act 1983, which came into force on 9 August 1983.

Section 2(6) of, and paragraph 4 of the schedule to, the act, were repealed by section 148(3) of, and schedule 4 to, the County Courts Act 1984, which came into force on 1 August 1984.

== Bibliography ==
- Heward, Edmund (1990). Lord Denning: A Biography. George Weidenfeld & Nicolson Limited. ISBN 0-297-81138-X.
- Stone, O.M. (1968). "Matrimonial Homes Act 1967". Modern Law Review. 31 (3). Blackwell Publishing: 305–309. doi:10.1111/j.1468-2230.1968.tb01189.x. ISSN 0026-7961.
