= Administration of Justice Act 1956 =

Act of the Parliament of the United Kingdom

Administration of Justice Act 1956 (Note: Section 57(1)–(4).)
- Act of Parliament
- Parliament of the United Kingdom
- Long title: An Act to amend the law relating to Admiralty jurisdiction, legal proceedings in connection with ships and aircraft and the arrest of ships and other property, to make further provision as to the appointment, tenure of office, powers and qualifications of certain judges and officers, to make certain other amendments of the law relating to the Supreme Court and the county courts and of the law relating to the enforcement of certain judgments, orders and decrees, to enable certain funds in court in the Lancashire Chancery Court to be transferred to the official trustees of charitable funds or the Church Commissioners, and for purposes connected with the matters aforesaid.
- Citation: 4 & 5 Eliz. 2. c. 46
- Territorial extent: England and Wales; Scotland (part V and section 51); Northern Ireland (part V and section 55); (Note: Section 57(3).)

Dates
- Royal assent: 5 July 1956
- Commencement: 16 July 1956 (sections 9–14, 32(1)–3, 33, 36, 38, 40, 42–44 and 51–54) (Note: Section 57(4). The Administration of Justice Act (Commencement) Order 1956 SI 1956/1065.); 1 January 1957 (sections 1–8, 26–31, 32(4), 34, 35, 37, 39, 41, 56) (Note: Section 57(2). The Administration of Justice Act (Commencement) (No. 2) Order 1956 (SI 1956/2099).); 1 March 1957 (first schedule) (Note: Section 57(4). The Administration of Justice Act 1956 (Commencement) (Northern Ireland) Order 1957 SI 1957/306.); 1 October 1957 (section 15) (Note: Section 57(4). The Administration of Justice Act 1956 (Commencement) Order 1957 (SI 1957/1179))
Other legislation
Amends	See § Repealed enactments
Repeals/revokes	See § Repealed enactments
Amended by	County Courts Act 1959; Statute Law Revision Act 1963; Matrimonial Causes Act 1965; Courts Act 1971; Statute Law (Repeals) Act 1974; Statute Law (Repeals) Act 1975; Judicature (Northern Ireland) Act 1978; Charging Orders Act 1979; Judicial Pensions Act 1981; Supreme Court Act 1981; Civil Jurisdiction and Judgments Act 1982; Insolvency Act 1985; Courts and Legal Services Act 1990; Merchant Shipping (Salvage and Pollution) Act 1994; Merchant Shipping Act 1995; Constitutional Reform Act 2005; Bankruptcy and Diligence etc. (Scotland) Act 2007; Crime and Courts Act 2013; Bankruptcy (Scotland) Act 2016

Status: Partially repealed

Text of statute as originally enacted

Revised text of statute as amended

Text of the Administration of Justice Act 1956 as in force today (including any amendments) within the United Kingdom, from legislation.gov.uk.

The Administration of Justice Act 1956 (4 & 5 Eliz. 2. c. 46) is an act of the Parliament of the United Kingdom that reformed the admiralty jurisdiction of the courts of the United Kingdom and the law relating to the arrest of ships and other property, made further provision as to the appointment and qualifications of certain judges and officers of the Supreme Court and the county courts, and amended the law relating to the enforcement of judgments, orders and decrees.

== Provisions ==
As enacted, the act was divided into six parts: Part I (Admiralty jurisdiction and other provisions as to ships), Part II (Supreme Court of Judicature), Part III (county courts), Part IV (general provisions as to enforcement of judgments and orders), Part V (Admiralty jurisdiction and arrestment of ships in Scotland) and Part VI (miscellaneous and supplemental), together with a First Schedule making corresponding provision for Northern Ireland and a Second Schedule of repeals. Part I gave effect in England and Wales to the International Convention Relating to the Arrest of Sea-Going Ships, signed at Brussels on 10 May 1952.

=== Repealed enactments ===
Section 57(2) of the act repealed 26 enactments, listed in the second schedule to the act.

Citation	Short title	Extent of repeal
3 Geo. 4. c. 39	Warrants of Attorney Act 1822	The whole act.
1 & 2 Vict. c. 110	Judgments Act 1838	Section eleven.
6 & 7 Vict. c. 66	Warrants of Attorney Act 1843	The whole act.
18 & 19 Vict. c. 15	Judgments Act 1855	Section eleven.
20 & 21 Vict. c. clvii	Mayor's Court of London Procedure Act 1857	In section forty-eight, the proviso.
27 & 28 Vict. c. 112	Judgments Act 1864	The whole act.
32 & 33 Vict. c. 62	Debtors Act 1869	Sections twenty-four to twenty-eight.
35 & 36 Vict. c. 86	Borough and Local Courts of Record Act 1872	Section six.
38 & 39 Vict. c. 90	Employers and Workmen Act 1875	In section nine, the words from "and no goods" to "by a county court".
46 & 47 Vict. c. 52	Bankruptcy Act 1883	Section one hundred and forty-six.
54 & 55 Vict. c. 8	Tithe Act 1891	Subsection (8) of section two to the words "this Act, and"; the Schedule.
57 & 58 Vict. c. 60	Merchant Shipping Act 1894	Sections one hundred and sixty-five and six hundred and eighty-eight.
5 Edw. 7. c. 10	Shipowners' Negligence (Remedies) Act 1905	The whole act.
1 & 2 Geo. 5. c. 41	Merchant Shipping (Stevedores and Trimmers) Act 1911	The whole act.
10 & 11 Geo. 5. c. 17	Increase of Rent and Mortgage Interest (Restrictions) Act 1920	Subsection (4) of section five except the words: "Notwithstanding anything in section one of the Small Tenements Recovery Act, 1838, every warrant to enter and give possession of any dwelling-house to which this Act applies shall remain in force for three months from the date of the issue of the warrant and for such further period or periods, if any, as the court shall from time to time, whether before or after the expiration of such three months, direct."
15 & 16 Geo. 5. c. 19	Trustee Act 1925	In subsection (4) of section twenty-five, the words "within ten days after the execution thereof or where not executed within the United Kingdom within ten days after its receipt in the United Kingdom".
15 & 16 Geo. 5. c. 20	Law of Property Act 1925	Subsections (1), (2), (3) and (5) of section one hundred and ninety-five.
15 & 16 Geo. 5. c. 21	Land Registration Act 1925	Subsection (2) of section one hundred and twenty-six.
15 & 16 Geo. 5. c. 49	Supreme Court of Judicature (Consolidation) Act 1925	Section twenty-two; in section thirty-one, in subsection (1), paragraph (g); section thirty-three; section sixty-two; sections eighty-six to ninety-seven; in section ninety-nine, in paragraph (d) of subsection (1), the words from the beginning of the paragraph to "Supreme Court and"; in section one hundred and twenty-five, in subsection (1), the words from "who" to the end of the subsection and in subsection (2), the words "and the tenure of their office"; in section one hundred and sixty-nine, in subsection (1), the word "personal"; subsection (4) of section two hundred and fourteen; in section two hundred and seventeen, in subsection (2), the words "shall not be less than six in number and".
16 & 17 Geo. 5. c. 11	Law of Property (Amendment) Act 1926	The entry in the Schedule relating to section twenty-five of the Trustee Act, 1925.
18 & 19 Geo. 5. c. 26	Administration of Justice Act 1928	In section ten, the word "personal".
22 & 23 Geo. 5. c. 55	Administration of Justice Act 1932	Section one.
24 & 25 Geo. 5. c. 53	County Courts Act 1934	In subsection (1) of section four, paragraph (a) of the proviso; in the proviso to subsection (1) of section twenty-one the words "an assistant registrar or", paragraph (a), in paragraph (b) the words "in the case of a civil servant", the words "a person employed in court service or" and the words "as the case may be"; subsection (2) of section twenty-five; in section twenty-six, the words from the first "and" to "section"; in subsection (4) of section twenty-nine, the words "as an assistant registrar or"; subsections (1) to (7) of section fifty-six; subsection (2) of section fifty-eight; in subsection (8) of section ninety-nine, the words from "(subject to the concurrence" to "of that Act)"; in subsection (1) of section one hundred and twenty-seven, the word "sworn"; section one hundred and thirty-six; in section one hundred and thirty-nine, paragraph (i); the proviso to section one hundred and fifty-two; in section one hundred and fifty-seven, the words "with the concurrence of the President of the Board of Trade"; in subsection (1) of section one hundred and sixty-four, the words "the King's Bench Division of" and the words "or in an admiralty action in the Probate, Divorce and Admiralty Division of that Court".
14 Geo. 6. c. 25	Matrimonial Causes Act 1950	In subsection (3) of section seventeen, the words before the proviso.
14 Geo. 6. c. 36	Diseases of Animals Act 1950	In subsection (2) of section seventy-five, the words from "and the local authority" to the end of the subsection.
4 & 5 Eliz. 2. c. 8	County Courts Act 1955	Subsection (1) of section three.

Section 55(1) of the act repealed 8 enactments, listed in part III of the first schedule to the act, as far as they related to Northern Ireland.

Citation	Short title	Extent of repeal
30 & 31 Vict. c. 114	Court of Admiralty (Ireland) Act 1867	Sections seven, twenty-seven to thirty-eight and seventy-four and seventy-five, and in section seventy-eight, the words "in some other local court or", the words "to such other local court or" and the words "(as the case may be)".
39 & 40 Vict. c. 28	Court of Admiralty (Ireland) Amendment Act 1876	Sections three, fifteen and sixteen.
40 & 41 Vict. c. 56	County Officers and Courts (Ireland) Act 1877	Section forty-nine.
57 & 58 Vict. c. 57	Diseases of Animals Act 1894	In subsection (2) of section forty-six the words from "and the local authority" to the end of the subsection.
57 & 58 Vict. c. 60	Merchant Shipping Act 1894	Sections one hundred and sixty-five, five hundred and sixty-five and six hundred and eighty-eight.
5 Edw. 7. c. 10	Shipowners' Negligence (Remedies) Act 1905	The whole act.
1 & 2 Geo. 5. c. 41	Merchant Shipping (Stevedores and Trimmers) Act 1911	The whole act.
1 & 2 Geo. 5. c. 57	Maritime Conventions Act 1911	Section five.

== Subsequent developments ==
Parts I and II (sections 1 to 20) were repealed by the Supreme Court Act 1981, along with sections 34, 36, 38 and 42 to 44. Most of Part III was repealed by the County Courts Act 1959: section 21 (with savings), sections 22 to 24, 26 to 30 and 32, and section 31(1)(3)(4) and 33(3). Section 25 was repealed by the Judicial Pensions Act 1981, and section 31(2) by the Matrimonial Causes Act 1965. Section 35 was repealed by the Charging Orders Act 1979, and section 37 with effect from 1 July 1991 by the Courts and Legal Services Act 1990. Section 52 was repealed by the Courts Act 1971, and section 51(a) by the Civil Jurisdiction and Judgments Act 1982. The Second Schedule, Part III of the First Schedule and section 57(2), all by then spent, were repealed by the Statute Law (Repeals) Act 1974, and the original section 47(8) was repealed by the Statute Law Revision Act 1963.

Section 57(2) of, part III of schedule 1 to, and schedule 2 to, the act, together with words in sections 7(1) and 55(1), were repealed by section 1 of, and part XI of the schedule to, the Statute Law (Repeals) Act 1974, which came into force on 27 June 1974.

The surviving provisions have themselves been amended. Section 40 was amended by the Insolvency Act 1985 and the Crime and Courts Act 2013. Sections 47 and 48 (Part V) were amended by the Merchant Shipping (Salvage and Pollution) Act 1994 and the Merchant Shipping Act 1995. New sections 47A to 47H, concerning maritime liens over ships under charter by demise, were inserted into Part V by the Bankruptcy and Diligence etc. (Scotland) Act 2007, and section 47G(3) was later substituted by the Bankruptcy (Scotland) Act 2016. Paragraph 4A of the First Schedule was inserted by the Judicature (Northern Ireland) Act 1978 and amended by the Constitutional Reform Act 2005. As a result of this amendment history, Part V (Admiralty jurisdiction and arrestment of ships in Scotland), section 40, section 51, section 55 and Parts I and II of the First Schedule remain in force.
