= Family Law Reform Act 1969 =

Act of the Parliament of the United Kingdom

Family Law Reform Act 1969 (Note: Section 28(1).)
- Act of Parliament
- Parliament of the United Kingdom
- Long title: An Act to amend the law relating to the age of majority, to persons who have not attained that age and to the time when a particular age is attained; to amend the law relating to the property rights of illegitimate children and of other persons whose relationship is traced through an illegitimate link; to make provision for the use of blood tests for the purpose of determining the paternity of any person in civil proceedings; to make provision with respect to the evidence required to rebut a presumption of legitimacy and illegitimacy; to make further provision, in connection with the registration of the birth of an illegitimate child, for entering the name of the father; and for connected purposes.
- Citation: 1969 c. 46
- Territorial extent: England and Wales (Note: Section 28(4).)

Dates
- Royal assent: 25 July 1969
- Commencement: 1 January 1970 (Note: Section 28(3). The Family Law Reform Act 1969 (Commencement No. 1) Order 1969.); 1 March 1972 (Note: Section 28(3). The Family Law Reform Act 1969 (Commencement No. 2) Order 1971.)
Other legislation
Amends	Tenures Abolition Act 1660; Wills Act 1837; Duchy of Cornwall Management Act 1863; Employers and Workmen Act 1875; Trade Union Act Amendment Act 1876; Married Women's Policies of Assurance (Scotland) Act 1880; Married Women's Property Act 1882; Foreign Marriage Act 1892; Friendly Societies Act 1896; Marriage with Foreigners Act 1906; Wills (Soldiers and Sailors) Act 1918; Settled Land Act 1925; Trustee Act 1925; Law of Property Act 1925; Administration of Estates Act 1925; Supreme Court of Judicature (Consolidation) Act 1925; Legitimacy Act 1926; Supreme Court Funds Rules 1927; Trustee Savings Banks Regulations 1929; Savings Certificates Regulations 1933; Inheritance (Family Provision) Act 1938; North of Scotland Hydro-Electric Board (Borrowing and Stock) Regulations 1946; British Nationality Act 1948; Marriage Act 1949; Gas (Stock) Regulations 1949; Civil List Act 1952; Customs and Excise Act 1952; Hypnotism Act 1952; Births and Deaths Registration Act 1953; Trustee Savings Banks Act 1954; Non-Contentious Probate Rules 1954; South of Scotland Electricity Board (Borrowing and Stock) Regulations 1955; Sexual Offences Act 1956; Premium Savings Bonds Regulations 1956; Electricity (Stock) Regulations 1957; Adoption Act 1958; County Courts Act 1959; Mental Health Act 1959; Building Societies Act 1962; Betting, Gaming and Lotteries Act 1963; Exchange of Securities (General) Rules 1963; Industrial and Provident Societies Act 1965; Matrimonial Causes Act 1965; Government Stock Regulations 1965; County Court Funds Rules 1965; Mayor's and City of London Court Funds Rules 1965; Registration of Births, Deaths and Marriages Regulations 1968
Amended by	Finance Act 1969; Law Reform (Miscellaneous Provisions) Act 1970; Matrimonial Proceedings and Property Act 1970; Guardianship of Minors Act 1971; Courts Act 1971; Friendly Societies Act 1974; Inheritance (Provision for Family and Dependants) Act 1975; Legitimacy Act 1976; Domestic Proceedings and Magistrates' Courts Act 1978; Customs and Excise Management Act 1979; Senior Courts Act 1981; Representation of the People Act 1983; Mental Health Act 1983; County Courts Act 1984; Building Societies Act 1986; Family Law Reform Act 1987; Human Fertilisation and Embryology Act 1990; Statute Law (Repeals) Act 1993; Immigration and Asylum Act 1999; Mental Capacity Act 2005; Gambling Act 2005; Electoral Administration Act 2006; Human Fertilisation and Embryology Act 2008; Sovereign Grant Act 2011; Crime and Courts Act 2013; Co-operative and Community Benefit Societies Act 2014; Registration of Marriages Regulations 2021
Relates to	Age of Majority (Scotland) Act 1969; Divorce Reform Act 1969

Status: Amended

Text of statute as originally enacted

Revised text of statute as amended

Text of the Family Law Reform Act 1969 as in force today (including any amendments) within the United Kingdom, from legislation.gov.uk.

The Family Law Reform Act 1969 (c. 46) is an act of the Parliament of the United Kingdom amending various aspects of English family law. Amongst other provisions, the act lowered the age of majority from 21 years to 18 years, reformed the property rights of illegitimate children, and empowered civil courts to order blood tests to determine paternity.

The act, as it pertains to property rights, has been almost entirely repealed by the Family Law Reform Act 1987.

== Content ==
Part I deals with the reduction of the age of majority in England and Wales from 21 to 18. Provides provision for the Parliament of Northern Ireland to enact similar legislation.

Part II, covering the property rights of illegitimate children, has been largely repealed by the Family Law Reform Act 1987. Paragraphs 1 and 3 of section 19 of the act, the sole provisions in part II that remain in force, extend rights of children under section 11 of the Married Women's Property Act 1882 and section 2 of the Married Women's Policies of Assurance (Scotland) Act 1880 to illegitimate children.

Part III provides the courts with the power to compel the taking of blood tests to determine paternity of a child.

Part IV, for miscellaneous and general provisions, allows for the rebuttal of legal presumptions of legitimacy or illegitimacy with evidence of probability that a person is legitimate or illegitimate.
