= Law Reform (Miscellaneous Provisions) Act 1949 =

Act of the Parliament of the United Kingdom

Law Reform (Miscellaneous Provisions) Act 1949 (Note: Section 11(1).)
- Act of Parliament
- Parliament of the United Kingdom
- Long title: An Act to amend the law relating to divorce and other matrimonial proceedings, the admissibility of evidence as to access, the charge and payment of percentage under the Lunacy Act, 1890, and to wards of court; and for purposes connected therewith.
- Citation: 12, 13 & 14 Geo. 6. c. 100
- Territorial extent: England and Wales; Scotland; Northern Ireland (section 10); (Note: Section 11(2).)

Dates
- Royal assent: 16 December 1949
- Commencement: 16 December 1949 (Note: The Acts of Parliament (Commencement) Act 1793.)
Other legislation
Amends	Lunacy Act 1890; Matrimonial Causes Act 1937; Adoption of Children Act 1949
Amended by	Matrimonial Causes Act 1950; Adoption Act 1950; Mental Health Act 1959; Northern Ireland Constitution Act 1973; Statute Law (Repeals) Act 1975; Supreme Court Act 1981

Status: Amended

Text of statute as originally enacted

Revised text of statute as amended

Text of the Law Reform (Miscellaneous Provisions) Act 1949 as in force today (including any amendments) within the United Kingdom, from legislation.gov.uk.

The Law Reform (Miscellaneous Provisions) Act 1949 (12, 13 & 14 Geo. 6. c. 100) is an act of the Parliament of the United Kingdom that amended the law relating to divorce and other matrimonial proceedings, the admissibility of evidence as to access, the charge and payment of percentage under the Lunacy Act 1890 (53 & 54 Vict. c. 5), and wards of court.

== Provisions ==
=== Matrimonial jurisdiction ===
Section 1 extended the jurisdiction of the High Court of Justice in England and Wales in matrimonial proceedings. Notwithstanding that the husband was not domiciled in England, the court was given jurisdiction in proceedings by a wife for divorce or nullity of marriage where the wife was resident in England and had been ordinarily resident there for a period of three years immediately preceding the commencement of the proceedings, and the husband was not domiciled in any other part of the United Kingdom or in the Channel Islands or the Isle of Man. The same rule applied to proceedings for a presumption of death and dissolution of marriage under section 8 of the Matrimonial Causes Act 1937 (1 Edw. 8. & 1 Geo. 6. c. 57).

Section 2 made corresponding provision for the Court of Session in Scotland in relation to consistorial proceedings, applying the same residential qualification for wives seeking divorce or nullity, with a corresponding rule for proceedings under section 5 of the Divorce (Scotland) Act 1938 (1 & 2 Geo. 6. c. 50).

=== Definition of care and treatment ===
Section 3 extended the definition of "care and treatment" for the purposes of section 176 of the Supreme Court of Judicature (Consolidation) Act 1925 (15 & 16 Geo. 5. c. 49) to include persons detained under the Lunacy (Scotland) Acts 1857 to 1919, persons detained under any law in force in Northern Ireland, the Isle of Man, or the Channel Islands relating to mental illness or criminal lunatics, and persons receiving mental treatment as voluntary patients under the Mental Treatment Act 1930 (20 & 21 Geo. 5. c. 23) or corresponding legislation following a period of such detention.

=== Legitimacy of children of voidable marriages ===
Section 4(1) provided that where a decree of nullity was granted in respect of a voidable marriage, any child who would have been the legitimate child of the parties had the marriage been dissolved instead of annulled on the date of the decree should be deemed to be their legitimate child notwithstanding the annulment. Section 4(2) repealed the corresponding provision in section 7(2) of the Matrimonial Causes Act 1937 (1 Edw. 8. & 1 Geo. 6. c. 57).

=== Maintenance ===
Section 5 gave the High Court in England power to order a husband to make periodical payments to his wife where he had been guilty of wilful neglect to provide reasonable maintenance for her or the infant children of the marriage, provided the court would have had jurisdiction to hear proceedings by the wife for judicial separation. Section 6 extended the court's power under section 14 of the Administration of Justice (Miscellaneous Provisions) Act 1938 (1 & 2 Geo. 6. c. 63) to discharge, vary, or suspend maintenance orders to cover orders made under section 5 and orders for the securing of a gross or annual sum under section 190(1) of the Supreme Court of Judicature (Consolidation) Act 1925 (15 & 16 Geo. 5. c. 49).

=== Evidence of access ===
Section 7(1) provided that, notwithstanding any rule of law, the evidence of a husband or wife should be admissible in any proceedings to prove that marital intercourse did or did not take place between them during any period. Section 7(2) preserved the right of a spouse not to be compelled to give such evidence. Section 7(3) repealed section 4 of the Adoption of Children Act 1949 (12, 13 & 14 Geo. 6. c. 98).

=== Amendment of the Lunacy Act 1890 ===
Section 8 inserted a proviso at the end of section 148(3) of the Lunacy Act 1890 (53 & 54 Vict. c. 5), which provided that the percentage payable in proceedings relating to a patient and his estate should be charged upon his estate. The proviso ensured that neither the charge so created nor any payment made by virtue of it should cause any interest of the patient in any property to fail or determine or to be prevented from recommencing.

=== Wards of court ===
Section 9 reformed the law of wardship. Subsection (1) provided that no infant should be made a ward of court except by virtue of an order to that effect made by the court. Subsection (2) provided that where an application was made for such an order, the infant should automatically become a ward of court on the making of the application, but should cease to be a ward at the expiration of such period as might be prescribed by rules of court unless an order had been made within that period. Subsection (3) gave the court power to order that any infant who was a ward of court should cease to be so.

=== Provisions as to Northern Ireland ===
Section 10 declared that the Parliament of Northern Ireland had and had always had power to make laws corresponding to the provisions of sections 1 and 2 of the act and section 13 of the Matrimonial Causes Act 1937 (1 Edw. 8. & 1 Geo. 6. c. 57).

== Subsequent developments ==
Sections 1, 2 and 4(2) of the act were repealed by section 1(1) of, and part VI of the schedule to, the Statute Law (Repeals) Act 1975, which came into force on 13 March 1975.
