= Adoption of Children Act 1949 =

Act of the Parliament of the United Kingdom

Adoption of Children Act 1949 (Note: Section 16(1).)
- Act of Parliament
- Parliament of the United Kingdom
- Long title: An Act to amend the law relating to the adoption of children; and for related purposes.
- Citation: 12, 13 & 14 Geo. 6. c. 98
- Territorial extent: England and Wales; Scotland; Northern Ireland (section 8 only); (Note: Section 16(4).)

Dates
- Royal assent: 16 December 1949
- Commencement: 1 January 1950 (Note: Section 16(3).)
- Repealed: 5 November 1993
Other legislation
Amended by	Law Reform (Miscellaneous Provisions) Act 1949; Adoption Act 1950; Children Act 1958; Child Care Act 1980
Repealed by	Statute Law (Repeals) Act 1993

Status: Repealed

Text of statute as originally enacted

Revised text of statute as amended

The Adoption of Children Act 1949 (12, 13 & 14 Geo. 6. c. 98) was an act of the Parliament of the United Kingdom. This legislation liberalised various rules concerning adoption. Placement of children for adoption came under the supervision of local authorities, while adopted children were given inheritance rights. In addition, the legislation also rejected the notion, implied in the Adoption of Children Act 1926 (16 & 17 Geo. 5. c. 29), that the mother had to know the identity of the adopter if she could reasonably give consent to adoption. The act instead allowed the identity of the adopter to be concealed behind a serial number. The act was repealed on 5 November 1993.

== Scope of power to make adoption orders ==
This section explains that the mother and father of an infant child have the freedom to let someone adopt their child. But the choice has to be reached together. The child to be adopted may be from Wales or England and can be adopted by parents in Britain.

== Restrictions on making of adoption orders ==
In order to protect the adoptive children, restrictions on age are reinforced. No adoption will occur if the adopter is not at least 21 years old, is a relative of the infant, or is the mother or father of the infant.

== Consent to adoption ==
This section sets the rule to make sure all family members are in accordance to the adoption of the child. Consequently, an adoption will not take place unless the family of the infant agrees to it. Section 3, Number 1 reads:

An adoption order shall not be made except with the adoption. Consent of every person or body who is a parent or guardian of the infant, or who is liable by virtue of any order or agreement to contribute to the maintenance of the infant: Provided that the court may dispense with any consent required by this subsection if it is satisfied-

(a) in the case of a parent or guardian of the infant, that he has abandoned, neglected or persistently ill-treated the infant;
(b) in the case of a person liable as aforesaid to contribute to the maintenance of the infant, that he has persistently neglected-or refused so to contribute;
(c) in any case, that the person whose consent is required cannot be found, or is incapable of giving his consent or that his consent is unreasonably withheld.

Requirements must be met to ensure the child’s best interests are at hand. If it is the parent or guardians wishes to not know who is going to adopt their child, those wishes will be respected. If they have specific things they’d like the child to be raised in such as a religion or a name they’d like the child to be called, that can be put on file and be afforded to them too.

== Evidence of paternity ==
The court needs to make sure that the children that are up for adoption are really the children of whoever is claiming to be the parents. Marital intercourse proof must be presented by both parties: wife and husband. Section 4, Number 1 reads:

It is relevant to determine whether marital intercourse took place between a husband and his wife during a particular period, evidence that such intercourse did not take place may be given in the proceedings on the application by either of the parties concerned.

== Probationary period ==
Section 5(1) reads:

After the expiration of three months from the commencement of this Act an adoption order shall not be made period. in the case of any infant unless- (a) the infant has been continuously in the care and possession of the applicant for at least three consecutive months immediately preceding the date of the order; and (b) the applicant has, at least three months before the date of the order, notified the welfare authority for the area in which he is for the time being resident of his intention to apply for an adoption order in respect of the infant.

Details are closely monitored in order to not cultivate unlawful virtues because of the adoption of a child. Section 5, Number 3 reads:

Where, under subsection (1) of this section, notice is given to the welfare authority in respect, of an infant who is not, over compulsory school age, subsections (5) to (7) and (10) of section seven of the Adoption of Children (Regulation) Act, 1939 (hereinafter referred to as " the act of 1939 " ). shall,, notwithstanding anything in that section or in section thirty-seven of the Children Act, 1948, but subject to the provisions of subsection' (2) of the said section seven, apply in relation to the infant and the person by whom the notice is given as they apply in relation to an adopted child and an adopter within the meaning of that section.

== Arrangements made by adoption societies ==
If for some reason the adopted child must be returned to an adoption society such as a foster home, or orphanage, it is important that the child be left by his or her adopter, and met with a specific person that will accommodate their emotional needs. Section 6, Number 3 reads:

The period within which, under subsection of the said section six, an, adopter is required to apply for an adoption order or give notice to the adoption society of his intention, not to apply for such an order shall be six months from the expiration of the period specified in subsection of the said section six instead of three months from the expiration of that period.

== Local authorities ==
There are 'local authorities' that are part of the adoption counsel in any city, or state.

Section 7(1) reads:

Every such local authority as aforesaid has power in connection with their functions under any enactment relating to children to make and participate in arrangements for the adoption of children.

All local authorities had to the right to revise documents of potential adopters; they kept and could access records of children in the adoption societies; and legal measures could be taken if they found things that were not befitting.

== Citizenship of adopted children ==
This section makes clear that if the adoptive parents of a child are citizens of the United Kingdom, that child will be a citizen as well.

== Provisions supplementary to section 9 ==
This section proclaims that an adopted person becomes the family member of anyone that is related to their adoptive parents. This section also states that all adoptions therefore must be done for the right reasons, not by intentions motivated by greed or gain.

== Other effects of adoption order ==
Marriage does not become invalid if one spouse has adopted a child and the other has not. Also if the father of a child decides he is going to bestow monthly or annual monies onto their child that has been adopted that will be repressed. If a mother were to bestow monthly monies onto her child that she had given up for adoption that would be acceptable, until she got married, then she would have to stop.

== Registration of adoption orders ==
This section states that there are organized and kept records of children that were adopted, whom they were adopted by, when they were adopted, what their conditions were, how old the child and the parents were, all details would be put in the record. Section 12(2) reads:

(a) where the precise date of the infant's birth is not proved to the satisfaction of the court, the court shall determine the probable date of his birth and the date so determined shall be specified in the order as the date of his birth; (b) where the name or surname which the infant is to bear after the adoption differs from his original name or surname, the new name or surname shall be specified in the order instead of the original.

If there was an infant who had not been requested to be adopted before, and now had someone interested in adopting them, their name and information would be directed to the Registrar General to cause the entry in the Registers of Births to be marked with the word 'adopted'. If there was an infant who had previously been the subject of an adoption order, the order would contain a direction to the Registrar General to cause the previous entry in the Adopted Children Register to be marked with the word “re-adopted." There are many more intricacies that are included in the Registration of Adoption Orders.

== Definition of 'relative' ==
Section 13, Number 1 reads:

For the purposes of this Act, the expression “relative ", in relation to an infant, means a grandparent, brother, “relative ". Sister, uncle or aunt, whether of the full blood, of the half-blood or by affinity, and includes-(a) where an adoption order has been made in respect of the infant or any other person, any person who would be a relative of the infant within the meaning of this definition if the adopted person were the child of the adopter born in lawful wedlock; (b) where the infant is illegitimate, the father of the infant and any person who would be a relative of the infant within the meaning of this definition if the infant were the legitimate child of its mother and father.

== Interpretation and construction ==
This section is making clear the type of appropriate dialogue and certain words that will be used during the adoption process and in the work of adoption. Section 14, Number 1 reads:

Hereby respectively assigned to them, that is to say "adoption order" means an order under section one of the principal Act and includes, in sections eight, nine, ten, eleven and thirteen of this Act, an order authorizing an adoption under the Adoption of Children (Scotland) Act, 1930, or the Adoption of Children Act (Northern Ireland), 1929, or any enactment of the Parliament of Northern Ireland for the time being in force; "adoption society" and "welfare authority" have the same meanings as in the act of 1939; "compulsory school age" has the same meaning as in the Education Act, 1944; “father", in relation to an illegitimate infant, means the natural father.

== Application to Scotland ==
This section makes clear which sections in the act can be referenced to for the Adoption of Children Act 1926 (16 & 17 Geo. 5. c. 29); Adoption of Children (Scotland) Act 1930 (20 & 21 Geo. 5. c. 37); the Children and Young Persons Act 1933 (23 & 24 Geo. 5. c. 12), and more. The United Kingdom worked closely with Scotland and their adoptive system, hence, the Registrar General for Scotland is often referenced to.

== Short title, commencement and extent ==
Section 16 reads:

(1) This Act may be cited as the Adoption of Children Act, 1949.

(2) This Act and the principal Act and the act of 1939 may be cited together as the Adoption of Children Acts, 1926 to 1949. and this Act and the Adoption of Children (Scotland) Act, 1930, and the act of 1939 may be cited together as the Adoption of Children (Scotland) Acts, 1930 to, 1949.

(3) This Act shall come into operation on the first day of January, nineteen hundred and fifty.

(4) This Act, except section eight, shall not extend to Northern Ireland.

== Subsequent developments ==
The whole act was repealed by section 1(1) of, and part VIII of schedule 1 to, the Statute Law (Repeals) Act 1993, which came into force on 5 November 1993.
