= County Courts Act 1984 =

Act of the Parliament of the United Kingdom

County Courts Act 1984 (Note: Section 151.)
- Act of Parliament
- Parliament of the United Kingdom
- Long title: An Act to consolidate certain enactments relating to county courts
- Citation: 1984 c. 28
- Territorial extent: England and Wales (Note: Section 149(3).)

Dates
- Royal assent: 26 June 1984
- Commencement: 1 August 1984 (Note: Section 150.)

Other legislation
- Amends: Landlord and Tenant Act 1709; Attachment of Earnings Act 1971; Land Charges Act 1972; Evidence (Proceedings in other Jurisdictions) Act 1975; See § Repealed enactments
- Repeals/revokes: See § Repealed enactments
- Amended by: Matrimonial and Family Proceedings Act 1984; Local Government Act 1985; Administration of Justice Act 1985; Housing (Consequential Provisions) Act 1985; Insolvency Act 1985; Statute Law (Repeals) Act 1986; Building Societies Act 1986; Housing Act 1988; Income and Corporation Taxes Act 1988; Norfolk and Suffolk Broads Act 1988; Education Reform Act 1988; Statute Law (Repeals) Act 1989; Children Act 1989; Courts and Legal Services Act 1990; Local Government Finance (Repeals, Savings and Consequential Amendments) Order 1990; High Court and County Courts Jurisdiction Order 1991; Statute Law (Repeals) Act 1993; Police and Magistrates' Courts Act 1994; Judicial Pensions and Retirement Act 1993; Civil Evidence Act 1995; Private International Law (Miscellaneous Provisions) Act 1995; Environment Act 1995; Merchant Shipping Act 1995; Trusts of Land and Appointment of Trustees Act 1996; Arbitration Act 1996; Civil Procedure Act 1997; Civil Procedure (Modification of Enactments) Order 1998; Access to Justice Act 1999; Criminal Justice and Police Act 2001; Financial Services and Markets Act 2000 (Consequential Amendments and Repeals) Order 2001; Adoption and Children Act 2002; Statute Law (Repeals) Act 2004; Constitutional Reform Act 2005; Equality Act 2006; Tribunals, Courts and Enforcement Act 2007; Legal Services Act 2007; Local Democracy, Economic Development and Construction Act 2009; Police Reform and Social Responsibility Act 2011; Crime and Courts Act 2013; Defamation Act 2013; Co-operative and Community Benefit Societies Act 2014; Policing and Crime Act 2017; Public Service Pensions and Judicial Offices Act 2022; Renting Homes (Wales) Act 2016 (Consequential Amendments) Regulations 2022; Levelling-up and Regeneration Act 2023

Status: Amended

Text of statute as originally enacted

Revised text of statute as amended

Text of the County Courts Act 1984 as in force today (including any amendments) within the United Kingdom, from legislation.gov.uk.

The County Courts Act 1984 (c. 28) is an act of the Parliament of the United Kingdom; the long title of the act is "An Act to consolidate certain enactments relating to county courts". The act replaced the County Courts Act 1959 (7 & 8 Eliz. 2. c. 22) and consolidated the law covering the county courts.

The County Court is an inferior court in the court system of England and Wales. The act establishes various rules relating to this court as well as setting limits on its jurisdiction.

== Provisions ==
Section 15 of the act limits the type of case which can be heard by the County Court, the most important being libel and slander, an action for which may only be taken in the King's Bench Division of the High Court of Justice.

Section 69 of the act enables a claimant to receive interest on sums awarded by the court.

=== Repealed enactments ===
Section 148(3) of the act repealed 21 enactments, listed in schedule 4 to the act.

Citation	Short title	Extent of repeal
7 & 8 Eliz. 2. c. 22	County Courts Act 1959	The whole act, except section 99(3), sections 168 to 174, 174A and 176.
10 & 11 Eliz. 2. c. 48	Law Reform (Husband and Wife) Act 1962	In section 1(3) the words from "and" to the end.
1965 c. 2	Administration of Justice Act 1965	Section 20(3) to (7). Section 23.
1967 c. 75	Matrimonial Homes Act 1967	Section 2(6). In the Schedule, paragraph 4.
1967 c. 80	Criminal Justice Act 1967	In Schedule 3 Part I, the entry relating to the County Courts Act 1959.
1969 c. 46	Family Law Reform Act 1969	In Schedule 1 the entry relating to the County Courts Act 1959.
1969 c. 58	Administration of Justice Act 1969	Sections 1 to 9. Section 11. Section 20(1) to (4), (6). In section 34(3) the words from the beginning to "1947 and", in their application to section 20 as regards county court rules under section 102 of the County Courts Act 1959.
1970 c. 31	Administration of Justice Act 1970	Section 29(5)(a). Sections 37 to 38. Section 45(2). In Schedule 2, paragraphs 21 to 24.
1971 c. 23	Courts Act 1971	Section 20(1) to (4).
1973 c. 15	Administration of Justice Act 1973	Section 7. Section 16(2) to (6). Schedule 2 so far as it relates to the County Courts Act 1959.
1976 c. 60	Insolvency Act 1976	Section 12(2). In Schedule 1, in Part I, the entry relating to the Administration of Justice Act 1965 and in Part II, paragraph 1(d).
1976 c. 80	Rent (Agriculture) Act 1976	In Schedule 8, paragraphs 7 and 8.
1977 c. 38	Administration of Justice Act 1977	Section 13 to 16. Section 17(1). Section 18. Section 19(1), (3) and (4). Section 20.
1977 c. 42	Rent Act 1977	In Schedule 23, paragraphs 29 and 30.
1977 c. 43	Protection from Eviction Act 1977	In Schedule 1, paragraph 2.
1979 c. 53	Charging Orders Act 1979	Section 7(1) and (2) so far as that subsection relates to the County Courts Act 1959.
1980 c. 43	Magistrates' Courts Act 1980	In Schedule 6A the entries relating to the County Courts Act 1959. In Schedule 7, paragraph 28.
1981 c. 49	Contempt of Court Act 1981	In Schedule 2 Part III, paragraphs 2 to 5.
1981 c. 54	Senior Courts Act 1981	Sections 33 to 35 so far as they relate to county courts. Section 149. Schedule 3. In Schedule 5 the entry relating to the Administration of Justice Act 1970. In Schedule 7 the entries relating to the County Courts Act 1959.
1982 c. 48	Criminal Justice Act 1982	In Schedule 4 the entry relating to the County Courts Act 1959.
1982 c. 53	Administration of Justice Act 1982	Section 15(2). Part V except sections 34, 35 and 37. Section 55(2). In Schedule 1 Part II. In Schedule 3, paragraphs 1, 3(a) and 5. In Schedule 4 Part II.
