= Inheritance (Provision for Family and Dependants) Act 1975 =

Act of the Parliament of the United Kingdom

Inheritance (Provision for Family and Dependants) Act 1975 (Note: Section 27(1).)
- Act of Parliament
- Parliament of the United Kingdom
- Long title: An Act to make fresh provision for empowering the court to make orders for the making out of the estate of a deceased person of provision for the spouse, former spouse, child, child of the family or dependant of that person; and for matters connected therewith.
- Citation: 1975 c. 63
- Territorial extent: England and Wales (Note: Section 27(2).)

Dates
- Royal assent: 12 November 1975
- Commencement: 1 April 1976 (Note: Section 27(3).)
Other legislation
| Amends | Intestates' Estates Act 1952; Matrimonial Causes Act 1965; Family Law Reform Act 1969; Administration of Justice Act 1970; Law Reform (Miscellaneous Provisions) Act 1970; Matrimonial Proceedings and Property Act 1970; Courts Act 1971; Matrimonial Causes Act 1973; Finance Act 1975 |
| Repeals/revokes | Inheritance (Family Provision) Act 1938 |
| Amended by | Administration of Justice Act 1982; Matrimonial and Family Proceedings Act 1984; Law Reform (Succession) Act 1995; Civil Partnership Act 2004; Equality Act 2010; Crime and Courts Act 2013; Inheritance and Trustees' Powers Act 2014; Civil Partnership (Opposite-sex Couples) Regulations 2019; Divorce, Dissolution and Separation Act 2020 |

Status: Amended

Text of statute as originally enacted

Revised text of statute as amended

Text of the Inheritance (Provision for Family and Dependants) Act 1975 as in force today (including any amendments) within the United Kingdom, from legislation.gov.uk.

The Inheritance (Provision for Family and Dependants) Act 1975 (c. 63) is an act of the Parliament of the United Kingdom concerning inheritance in England and Wales. It has been amended, for example to take into account civil partnerships.

== Provisions ==
The act makes provision for a court to vary (and extend when appropriate) the distribution of the estate of a deceased person to any spouse, former spouse, child, child of the family or dependant of that person in cases where the deceased person's will or the standard rules of intestacy fail to make reasonable financial provision. Such provision can be derived not just from monetary assets but from any others forming part of the estate or which have been disposed of in the six years prior to the death.

The act was introduced to extend the Inheritance (Family Provision) Act 1938, following reports from the Law Commission in 1973 and 1974.

== Types of claimants ==
There are categories under which someone can make an Inheritance Act 1975 claim by virtue of their relationship at death with a person who was domiciled in England and Wales. These categories are:

- Spouse or civil partner
- Former spouse or civil partner who has not remarried or repartnered
- Person living as cohabitant
- Child
- Someone treated as a child or being financially maintained

In each of these categories there are criteria and requirements that must be satisfied for eligibility to claim. An application must be brought within six months of when representation of the estate is taken out.

== Repeals ==
This act entirely repealed the Inheritance (Family Provision) Act 1938 (1 & 2 Geo. 6. c. 45). Ten other acts were partly repealed by this act, those repeals are listed in the Schedule to the act; further amendments to other legislation are made by section 26 of the act.

== See also ==
- English land law
- List of acts of the Parliament of the United Kingdom
- Intestacy
