= Adoption Act 1950 =

Act of the Parliament of the United Kingdom

Adoption Act 1950 (Note: Section 47(1).)
- Act of Parliament
- Parliament of the United Kingdom
- Long title: An Act to consolidate the enactments relating to the adoption of children with such corrections and improvements as may be authorised under the Consolidation of Enactments (Procedure) Act, 1949.
- Citation: 14 Geo. 6. c. 26
- Territorial extent: England and Wales; Scotland; (Note: Section 47(2).)

Dates
- Royal assent: 28 July 1950
- Commencement: 1 October 1950 (Note: Section 47(3).)
- Repealed: 1 April 1959
Other legislation
Amends	See § Repealed enactments
Repeals/revokes	See § Repealed enactments
Amended by	Magistrates' Courts Act 1952; Statute Law Revision Act 1953; Registration Service Act 1953; Children Act 1958
Repealed by	Adoption Act 1958

Status: Repealed

Text of statute as originally enacted

The Adoption Act 1950 (14 Geo. 6. c. 26) was an act of the Parliament of the United Kingdom that consolidated enactments relating to the adoption of children in Great Britain.

== Provisions ==
=== Repealed enactments ===
Section 46(1) of the act repealed 10 enactments, listed in the fourth schedule to the act.

Citation	Short title	Extent of repeal
16 & 17 Geo. 5. c. 29	Adoption of Children Act 1926	The whole act except subsections (3) and (4) of section five and section ten.
20 & 21 Geo. 5. c. 37	Adoption of Children (Scotland) Act 1930	The whole act except subsections (4) and (5) of section five and section ten.
1 Edw. 8 & 1 Geo. 6. c. 37	Children and Young Persons (Scotland) Act 1937	Subsection (3) of section fifty.
2 & 3 Geo. 6. c. 27	Adoption of Children (Regulation) Act 1939	The whole act.
3 & 4 Geo. 6. c. 2	Postponement of Enactments (Miscellaneous Provisions) Act 1939	Section two.
9 & 10 Geo. 6. c. 81	National Health Service Act 1946	So much of the Tenth Schedule as amends the Adoption of Children (Regulation) Act 1939.
11 & 12 Geo. 6. c. 39	Industrial Assurance and Friendly Societies Act 1948	Subsection (3) of section twenty-three.
11 & 12 Geo. 6. c. 43	Children Act 1948	Sections thirty-five and thirty-six so far as they relate to section seven of the Adoption of Children (Regulation) Act 1939; subsection (4) of section thirty-seven; and so much of the Third Schedule as amends the Adoption of Children (Regulation) Act 1939.
12, 13 & 14 Geo. 6. c. 98	Adoption of Children Act 1949	The whole act except section thirteen; and in subsection (2) of section thirteen the words "subsection (2) of section sixteen of the Act of 1939".
12, 13 & 14 Geo. 6. c. 100	Law Reform (Miscellaneous Provisions) Act 1949	Subsection (3) of section seven.

== Subsequent developments ==
The whole act was repealed by section 59(2) of, and the sixth schedule to, the Adoption Act 1958 (7 & 8 Eliz. 2. c. 5), which came into force on 1 April 1959.
