= Land Charges Act 1972 =

Act of the Parliament of the United Kingdom

Land Charges Act 1972 (Note: Section 19(1).)
- Act of Parliament
- Parliament of the United Kingdom
- Long title: An Act to consolidate certain enactments relating to the registration of land charges and other instruments and matters affecting land.
- Citation: 1972 c. 61
- Territorial extent: England and Wales (Note: Section 19(3).)

Dates
- Royal assent: 9 August 1972
- Commencement: 29 January 1973 (Note: Section 19(2). The Land Charges Act 1972 (Commencement) Order 1972 (SI 1972/2058).)

Other legislation
- Amends: Landlord and Tenant Act 1927; Tithe Act 1936; See § Repealed enactments
- Repeals/revokes: See § Repealed enactments
- Amended by: Finance Act 1975; Local Land Charges Act 1975; Finance Act 1977; Supreme Court Act 1981; Matrimonial Homes Act 1983; County Courts Act 1984; Capital Transfer Tax Act 1984; Companies Consolidation (Consequential Provisions) Act 1985; Insolvency Act 1985; Agricultural Holdings Act 1986; Insolvency Act 1986; High Court and County Courts Jurisdiction Order 1991; Access to Neighbouring Land Act 1992; Law of Property (Miscellaneous Provisions) Act 1994; Family Law Act 1996; Trusts of Land and Appointment of Trustees Act 1996; Land Registration Act 1997; Land Registration Act 2002; Statute Law (Repeals) Act 2004; Civil Contingencies Act 2004; Constitutional Reform Act 2005; Companies Act 2006 (Consequential Amendments, Transitional Provisions and Savings) Order 2009; Transfer of Functions (Her Majesty's Land Registry, the Meteorological Office and Ordnance Survey) Order 2011; Crime and Courts Act 2013; Deregulation Act 2015; Enterprise and Regulatory Reform Act 2013 (Consequential Amendments) (Bankruptcy) and the Small Business, Enterprise and Employment Act 2015 (Consequential Amendments) Regulations 2016

Status: Amended

Text of statute as originally enacted

Revised text of statute as amended

Text of the Land Charges Act 1972 as in force today (including any amendments) within the United Kingdom, from legislation.gov.uk.

The Land Charges Act 1972 (c. 61) is an act of the Parliament of the United Kingdom that updates the system for registering charges on unregistered land in England and Wales. It repealed and updated parts of the Land Charges Act 1925 (15 & 16 Geo. 5. c. 22) and other legislation affecting real property.

== Background ==
In the early 20th century, a package of reforms were made to register land in England and Wales to make conveyancing cheaper and simpler, and free land to the market. The main legislation was the Land Registration Act 1925 (15 & 16 Geo. 5. c. 2210), the Law of Property Act 1925 (15 & 16 Geo. 5. c. 20), the Trustee Act 1925 (15 & 16 Geo. 5. c. 19), and the Settled Land Act 1925 (15 & 16 Geo. 5. c. 187). However, much land was to remain unregistered. Instead, for land which was not yet registered, people could choose to explicitly register interests under the Land Charges Act 1925 (15 & 16 Geo. 5. c. 22), and so secure better protection than the common law might provide against a bona fide purchaser without notice of any equitable interest to be protected.

A local land charge is a restriction or prohibition imposed on a particular piece of land, which is binding on current and future owners and occupiers of the land. The purpose of the charge is either to secure payment of a sum of money, or to limit the use of the land.

In 1972, the 1925 act was updated into the present scheme.

== Provisions ==
=== Repealed enactments ===
Section 18(3) of the act repealed 7 enactments, listed in schedule 5 to the act.

| Citation | Short title | Extent of repeal |
|---|---|---|
| 15 & 16 Geo. 5. c. 22 | Land Charges Act 1925 | Sections 1 to 14, except section 10(6). |
| 15 & 16 Geo. 5. c. 22 | Land Charges Act 1925 | Section 15(6). |
| 15 & 16 Geo. 5. c. 22 | Land Charges Act 1925 | Section 16(2). |
| 15 & 16 Geo. 5. c. 22 | Land Charges Act 1925 | Section 17. |
| 15 & 16 Geo. 5. c. 22 | Land Charges Act 1925 | Section 19(2). |
| 15 & 16 Geo. 5. c. 22 | Land Charges Act 1925 | In section 20, paragraphs (1), (3), (5) and (7), in paragraph (10) the words "'registry' means His Majesty's Land Registry," and paragraphs (11) and (13). |
| 15 & 16 Geo. 5. c. 22 | Land Charges Act 1925 | Sections 21 to 23. |
| 15 & 16 Geo. 5. c. 22 | Land Charges Act 1925 | In section 24, paragraph (b). |
| 16 & 17 Geo. 5. c. 11 | Law of Property (Amendment) Act 1926 | Section 4. |
| 16 & 17 Geo. 5. c. 11 | Law of Property (Amendment) Act 1926 | In the Schedule, the first entry relating to section 10 of the Land Charges Act 1925. |
| 26 Geo. 5 & 1 Edw. 8. c. 43 | Tithe Act 1936 | Section 13(10). |
| 11 & 12 Geo. 6. c. 63 | Agricultural Holdings Act 1948 | In Schedule 7, paragraph 3. |
| 1967 c. 75 | Matrimonial Homes Act 1967 | Section 2(6), except so far as it relates to paragraphs 1 and 4 of the Schedule. |
| 1967 c. 75 | Matrimonial Homes Act 1967 | In the Schedule, paragraphs 2 and 3. |
| 1969 c. 59 | Law of Property Act 1969 | Section 25(7). |
| 1969 c. 59 | Law of Property Act 1969 | Sections 26 and 27. |
| 1971 c. 54 | Land Registration and Land Charges Act 1971 | Sections 5 to 11. |
| 1971 c. 54 | Land Registration and Land Charges Act 1971 | In section 12, the words from "and for" to the end of the section. |
| 1971 c. 54 | Land Registration and Land Charges Act 1971 | In section 15(1), paragraph (b) and the word "and" immediately preceding it. |
| 1971 c. 54 | Land Registration and Land Charges Act 1971 | In section 15(2), the words from "and Part II" to the end of the subsection. |
| 1971 c. 54 | Land Registration and Land Charges Act 1971 | In section 15(3), the words "Without prejudice to subsection (2) above". |
| 1971 c. 54 | Land Registration and Land Charges Act 1971 | Schedule 1. |

== See also ==
- English land law
