= County Courts Act 1959 =

Act of the Parliament of the United Kingdom

County Courts Act 1959 (Note: Section 208(1).)
- Act of Parliament
- Parliament of the United Kingdom
- Long title: An Act to consolidate, with corrections and improvements made under the Consolidation of Enactments (Procedure) Act, 1949, certain enactments relating to county courts.
- Citation: 7 & 8 Eliz. 2. c. 22
- Territorial extent: England and Wales (Note: Section 208(2).)

Dates
- Royal assent: 25 March 1959
- Commencement: 1 October 1959 (Note: Section 208(3).)
- Repealed: 1 August 1984
Other legislation
Amends	See § Repealed enactments
Repeals/revokes	See § Repealed enactments
Amended by	Statute Law Revision Act 1963; Rent Act 1965; Matrimonial Homes Act 1967; Rent Act 1968; Justices of the Peace Act 1968; Family Law Reform Act 1969; Statute Law (Repeals) Act 1969; Law Reform (Miscellaneous Provisions) Act 1970; Matrimonial Proceedings and Property Act 1970; Criminal Justice Act 1972; Juries Act 1974; Statute Law (Repeals) Act 1974; Statute Law (Repeals) Act 1975; Administration of Justice Act 1977; Statute Law (Repeals) Act 1978; Senior Courts Act 1981
Repealed by	County Courts Act 1984

Status: Repealed

Text of statute as originally enacted

The County Courts Act 1959 (7 & 8 Eliz. 2. c. 22) was an act of the Parliament of the United Kingdom that consolidated enactments relating to county courts in England and Wales.

== Provisions ==
=== Repealed enactments ===
Section 204 of the act repealed 10 enactments, listed in the third schedule to the act.

Citation	Short title	Extent of repeal
24 & 25 Geo. 5. c. 53	County Courts Act 1934	The whole Act except sections nine, twenty-one and twenty-nine, section one hundred and ninety-one (so far as it relates to the definition of "Superannuation Acts"), section one hundred and ninety-three and the First Schedule.
1 & 2 Geo. 6. c. 28	Evidence Act 1938	In section five, the words "and section ninety-nine of the County Courts Act, 1934."
1 & 2 Geo. 6. c. 34	Leasehold Property (Repairs) Act 1938	In section six, subsection (2).
1 & 2 Geo. 6. c. 63	Administration of Justice (Miscellaneous Provisions) Act 1938	Section seventeen. In the Second Schedule, the entries relating to the County Courts Act, 1934.
12 & 13 Geo. 6. c. 27	Juries Act 1949	Section seventeen.
4 & 5 Eliz. 2. c. 8	County Courts Act 1955	Sections one to six. In section seven, in subsection (1) the words from the beginning to "this Act". In section eight, subsection (1), and, in subsection (2), the words "as from the day so appointed", and the words "and any Order in Council" onwards. Sections nine to twelve. In section thirteen, in subsection (1), the words from "and this Act" onwards, and subsections (2) to (4). In the First Schedule, paragraphs 1 to 15. The Second Schedule.
4 & 5 Eliz. 2. c. 46	Administration of Justice Act 1956	In section two, in subsection (1) the words "and any county court with Admiralty jurisdiction", in subsection (3) the words "or a particular county court specified in the memorandum" and the words "or in any rules made under subsection (3) of section ninety-nine of the County Courts Act, 1934 for prescribing the courts in which proceedings shall be brought", in subsection (4) the words from "the jurisdiction of any county court" to "1934, or", subsection (5) and in subsection (6) the words "or in section fifty-five of the County Courts Act, 1934 or any order made thereunder" and the words "or on a county court". In section three, in subsection (1) the words "and any county court", in subsection (3) the words "and any county court", in subsection (4) the words "or any county court", in subsection (5) the words "and any county court", in subsection (6) the words "or any county court" and, in subsection (7) the words "or any county court". In section four, subsections (1) to (4) so far as regards county courts and, in subsection (6) the words "or a county court". In section seven, in subsection (2), the words from "and, as respects" to "1934". In section twelve, in subsection (7), paragraph (a). In section twenty-one, subsections (1) to (3), and, except as respects judges appointed before the commencement of this Act, subsection (4). Sections twenty-two to twenty-four. In section twenty-five, in subsection (3), the words from the beginning to "registrar, and". Sections twenty-six to thirty. In section thirty-one, subsections (1), (3) and (4). Section thirty-two. In section thirty-three, subsection (3). In section thirty-five, in subsection (1), the words "and any county court", in subsection (3), the proviso and, in subsection (4), the words "or the county court" in both places where they occur. In section thirty-six, in subsection (1), the words "and of the county court". In section thirty-seven, in subsection (1), the words "and section one hundred and twenty-one of the County Courts Act, 1934", in subsection (2) the words "and one hundred and twenty-one" and the words from "and section four" onwards and subsection (4). In section thirty-eight, in subsection (1), the words "and the county court". Sections thirty-nine and forty-one. In section fifty-four, in subsection (1), paragraph (a).
5 & 6 Eliz. 2. c. 46	Judicial Offices (Salaries and Pensions) Act 1957	In section one, in subsection (1), paragraph (5), and in subsection (2), the words "to a county court judge or".
5 & 6 Eliz. 2. c. 56	Housing Act 1957	In the Tenth Schedule, the entry relating to the County Courts Act, 1934.
6 & 7 Eliz. 2. c. 53	Variation of Trusts Act 1958	In section one, in subsection (3), the words "Subject as hereinafter provided", and subsection (4).

== Subsequent developments ==
Section 204 of, and schedule 3 to, the act were repealed by section 1 of, and part XI of the schedule to, the Statute Law (Repeals) Act 1974, which came into force on 27 June 1974.

The whole act, except section 99(3), sections 168 to 174, 174A and 176, was repealed by section 148(3) of, and schedule 4 to, the County Courts Act 1984, which came into force on 1 August 1984.
