= Matrimonial Homes Act 1983 =

Act of the Parliament of the United Kingdom

Matrimonial Homes Act 1983 (Note: Section 13(1).)
- Act of Parliament
- Parliament of the United Kingdom
- Long title: An Act to consolidate certain enactments relating to the rights of a husband or wife to occupy a dwelling house that has been a matrimonial home.
- Citation: 1983 c. 19
- Territorial extent: England and Wales (Note: Section 13(3).)

Dates
- Royal assent: 9 May 1983
- Commencement: 9 August 1983 (Note: Section 13(2).)
- Repealed: 1 October 1997 (Note: The Family Law Act 1996 (Commencement No. 2) Order 1997 (SI 1997/1892))

Other legislation
- Amends: See § Repealed enactments
- Repeals/revokes: See § Repealed enactments
- Amended by: Statute Law (Repeals) Act 1986; Private International Law (Miscellaneous Provisions) Act 1995
- Repealed by: Family Law Act 1996

Status: Repealed

Text of statute as originally enacted

Revised text of statute as amended

The Matrimonial Homes Act 1983 (c. 19) was an act of the Parliament of the United Kingdom that consolidated enactments relating to the rights of a husband or wife to occupy a dwelling house that had been a matrimonial home in England and Wales.

== Provisions ==
=== Repealed enactments ===
Section 12(2) of the act repealed 7 enactments, listed in schedule 3 to the act.

Citation	Short title	Extent of repeal
1967 c. 75	Matrimonial Homes Act 1967	The whole act except section 2(6) so far as it relates to paragraph 4 of the schedule, and except that paragraph.
1970 c. 45	Matrimonial Proceedings and Property Act 1970	Section 38.
1972 c. 61	Land Charges Act 1972	In schedule 3, paragraphs 8 to 12.
1976 c. 50	Domestic Violence and Matrimonial Proceedings Act 1976	Sections 3 and 4.
1977 c. 42	Rent Act 1977	In schedule 23, paragraph 40.
1980 c. 51	Housing Act 1980	In schedule 25, paragraph 14.
1981 c. 24	Matrimonial Homes and Property Act 1981	Sections 1 to 3. In section 4, subsections (2) and (3). Sections 5 and 6. Schedules 1 and 2.

== Subsequent developments ==
The whole act was repealed by section 66(3) of, and schedule 10 to, the Family Law Act 1996, which came into force on 1 October 1997.
