= Matrimonial Causes Act 1864 =

Act of the Parliament of the United Kingdom

Matrimonial Causes Act 1864 (Note: The citation of this act by this short title was authorised by section 1 of, and the first schedule to, the Short Titles Act 1896. Due to the repeal of those provisions it is now authorised by section 19(2) of the Interpretation Act 1978.)
- Act of Parliament
- Parliament of the United Kingdom
- Long title: An Act to amend the Act relating to Divorce and Matrimonial Causes in England, Twentieth and Twenty-first Victoria, Chapter Eighty-five.
- Citation: 27 & 28 Vict. c. 44
- Territorial extent: United Kingdom

Dates
- Royal assent: 14 July 1864
- Commencement: 14 July 1864 (Note: The Acts of Parliament (Commencement) Act 1793.)
- Repealed: 27 April 1965
Other legislation
Amends	Matrimonial Causes Act 1857
Amended by	Supreme Court of Judicature (Consolidation) Act 1925
Repealed by	Administration of Justice Act 1965

Status: Repealed

Text of statute as originally enacted

The Matrimonial Causes Act 1864 (27 & 28 Vict. c. 44) was an act of the Parliament of the United Kingdom. The act reduced the powers of women deserted by their husbands to protect their property and income from him or any of his creditors. The act received royal assent on 14 July 1864.

== Provisions ==
Women had been granted the ability to protect their property and earnings from a husband that had deserted them or his creditors in the Matrimonial Causes Act 1857 (20 & 21 Vict. c. 85) by applying to a police magistrate, a justice in the petty sessions or the Court for Divorce and Matrimonial Cases.

The provisions of the act included allowing husbands who had deserted their wives or creditors of those husbands to apply to a court to have an order that the wife had placed to protect her property or earnings from her husband and his creditors discharged.

== Subsequent developments ==
The whole act was repealed by section 34(1) of, and schedule 2 to, the Administration of Justice Act 1965, which came into force on 27 April 1965.
