= Matrimonial Causes Act 1950 =

Act of the Parliament of the United Kingdom

Matrimonial Causes Act 1950 (Note: Section 35(1).)
- Act of Parliament
- Parliament of the United Kingdom
- Long title: An Act to consolidate certain enactments relating to matrimonial causes in the High Court in England and to declarations of legitimacy and of validity of marriage and of British nationality, with such corrections and improvements as may be authorised by the Consolidation of Enactments (Procedure) Act, 1949.
- Citation: 14 Geo. 6. c. 25
- Territorial extent: England and Wales (Note: Section 35(3).)

Dates
- Royal assent: 28 July 1950
- Commencement: 1 January 1951 (Note: Section 35(2).)
- Repealed: 1 January 1966
Other legislation
Amends	See § Repealed enactments
Repeals/revokes	See § Repealed enactments
Amended by	Administration of Justice Act 1956; Divorce (Insanity and Desertion) Act 1958; Mental Health Act 1959
Repealed by	Matrimonial Causes Act 1965

Status: Repealed

Text of statute as originally enacted

The Matrimonial Causes Act 1950 (14 Geo. 6. c. 25) was an act of the Parliament of the United Kingdom that consolidated enactments relating to matrimonial causes in the High Court in England and Wales, and to declarations of legitimacy, the validity of marriage, and British nationality.

== Provisions ==
=== Repealed enactments ===
Section 34(1) of the act repealed 11 enactments, listed in the schedule to the act.

Citation	Short title	Extent of repeal
15 & 16 Geo. 5. c. 49	Supreme Court of Judicature (Consolidation) Act 1925	Sections one hundred and seventy-six to one hundred and ninety-eight A.
16 & 17 Geo. 5. c. 60	Legitimacy Act 1926	Section two.
18 & 19 Geo. 5. c. 26	Administration of Justice Act 1928	Subsection (3) of section nineteen, and Part III of the First Schedule.
21 & 22 Geo. 5. c. 31	Marriage (Prohibited Degrees of Relationship) Act 1931	The whole act.
25 & 26 Geo. 5. c. 2	Supreme Court of Judicature (Amendment) Act 1935	Section four.
25 & 26 Geo. 5. c. 30	Law Reform (Married Women and Tortfeasors) Act 1935	The First Schedule, so far as it relates to the Supreme Court of Judicature (Consolidation) Act, 1925.
1 Edw. 8 & 1 Geo. 6. c. 57	Matrimonial Causes Act 1937	The whole act, except section eleven.
1 & 2 Geo. 6. c. 63	Administration of Justice (Miscellaneous Provisions) Act 1938	Section fourteen.
7 & 8 Geo. 6. c. 43	Matrimonial Causes (War Marriages) Act 1944	In section one, paragraph (6) of subsection (1).
12, 13 & 14 Geo. 6. c. 78	Married Women (Restraint upon Anticipation) Act 1949	The First Schedule, so far as it relates to the Supreme Court of Judicature (Consolidation) Act, 1925.
12, 13 & 14 Geo. 6. c. 100	Law Reform (Miscellaneous Provisions) Act 1949	Section one, except so much of subsection (4) as relates to the Matrimonial Causes (War Marriages) Act, 1944; sections three to seven.

== Subsequent developments ==
The whole act was repealed by section 45 of, and schedule 2 to, the Matrimonial Causes Act 1965, which came into force on 1 January 1966.
