= Sandra Mackey =

American academic

- Born: Sandra Sherman; September 13, 1937; Oklahoma City, Oklahoma, U.S.
- Died: April 19, 2015 (aged 77); Atlanta, Georgia, U.S.
- Education: University of Central Oklahoma (BA); University of Virginia (MA)
- Occupations: writer, commentator
- Notable work: Lebanon: Death of a Nation
- Spouse: Dan
- Children: 1

Sandra Mackey (née Sherman; September 13, 1937 – April 19, 2015) was an American writer on Middle Eastern culture and politics.

== Early life and education ==
Mackey was born Sandra Sherman in Oklahoma City, the daughter of funeral directors Velt Sherman Verna Richie Sherman.

Mackey first earned a bachelor's degree in history from the University of Central Oklahoma, followed by an M.A. in International Affairs from the University of Virginia.

== Career ==
Mackey taught political science at Georgia State University. She served as a visiting scholar in the Woodrow Wilson Department of Government and Foreign Affairs at the University of Virginia. Her writings appeared in such periodicals as the Chicago Tribune, Los Angeles Times, The Wall Street Journal, and The Christian Science Monitor.

In addition to appearing on NPR, Nightline, ABC News with Peter Jennings and the BBC, she served as a commentator on the first Gulf War for CNN. Her book Lebanon: Death of a Nation was named to The New York Times list of Notable Books of 1989.

== Death ==
Mackey died on April 19, 2015, aged 77. She and her husband, Dan, had a son, Colin, who survives his mother.

== Selected works ==
External videos
- Booknotes interview with Mackey on The Reckoning, July 7, 2002, C-SPAN
- Presentation by Mackey on The Reckoning, April 1, 2003, C-SPAN

Books written by Sandra Mackey include:

- The Saudis: Inside the Desert Kingdom, W. W. Norton and Co., New York, 1987; ISBN 0-395-41165-3.
  - Updated edition issued in 2002; ISBN 0-393-32417-6 pbk
- Lebanon: Death of a Nation, W.W. Norton and Co., New York, 1989; ISBN 0-393-32843-0.
- Passion and Politics: The Turbulent World of the Arabs, Penguin Group, New York, 1992; ISBN 0-525-93499-5
- The Iranians: Persia, Islam and the Soul of a Nation, Penguin Group, New York, 1996; ISBN 0-452-27563-6
- The Reckoning: Iraq and the Legacy of Saddam Hussein, W. W. Norton, New York, 2003; ISBN 0-393-32428-1
- Lebanon: a House Divided, W. W. Norton, New York, 2006; ISBN 0-393-32843-0
- Mirror of the Arab World: Lebanon in Conflict, W. W. Norton, New York, 2008; ISBN 978-0-393-06218-2

== See also ==
- Iranian studies
