= Commonwealth (Adultery) Act (1650) =

The Commonwealth (Adultery) Act of May 1650 ("An Act for suppressing the detestable sins of Incest, Adultery and Fornication") was an act of the English Rump Parliament. It imposed the death penalty for incest, and for adultery, that was defined as sexual intercourse between a married woman and a man other than her husband. Both partners would be liable for death sentence in such a case, although the courts were reluctant to impose the ultimate penalty. If a man (married or unmarried) had sex with an unmarried woman (including a widow), that would be fornication, punishable only by three months for first offenders, applicable to both partners. It did not apply to women whose husbands were absent for more than three years and not known to be living. Like other legislation passed by the Commonwealth of England, the act was repealed following the Restoration of the Monarchy in 1660. In the history of adultery in English law, the Act represents the only time since the twelfth century when adultery has been outlawed in secular statute law.
