= May Seaton-Tiedeman =

Campaigner for divorce law reform

May Louise Seaton-Tiedeman (born May Louise Seaton; 16 August 1862 – 22 October 1948) was a prominent American-born campaigner in Britain for divorce law reform and women's suffrage, and an active member of the Ethical movement.

== Life ==
May Louise Seaton spent the early years of her life in Boston, Massachusetts, the daughter of Alfred Herbert and Hannora Seaton. As a teenager, she moved with her family to England. In 1886 she married Dutch journalist and editor Frederick Henry Lewis Tiedeman, with whom she had one son, Henry Seaton Tiedeman. Based in London, the couple travelled widely, socialising with a large group of influential and reformist friends. Frederick Tiedeman died in 1915, ending a happy marriage of nearly three decades. The following year, May married a long-time family friend, Edward Woolf Abrams, a metal mining agent. This marriage too lasted nearly 30 years, until Abrams' death in 1945.

Seaton-Tiedeman was a devoted suffragist, as well as a long-time campaigner for changes to divorce laws in the United Kingdom. She served for many years on the executive committee of the Union of Ethical Societies (today Humanists UK) and, at the age of 70, spoke in Hyde Park for women's suffrage celebrations.

== Work for the Divorce Law Reform Union ==
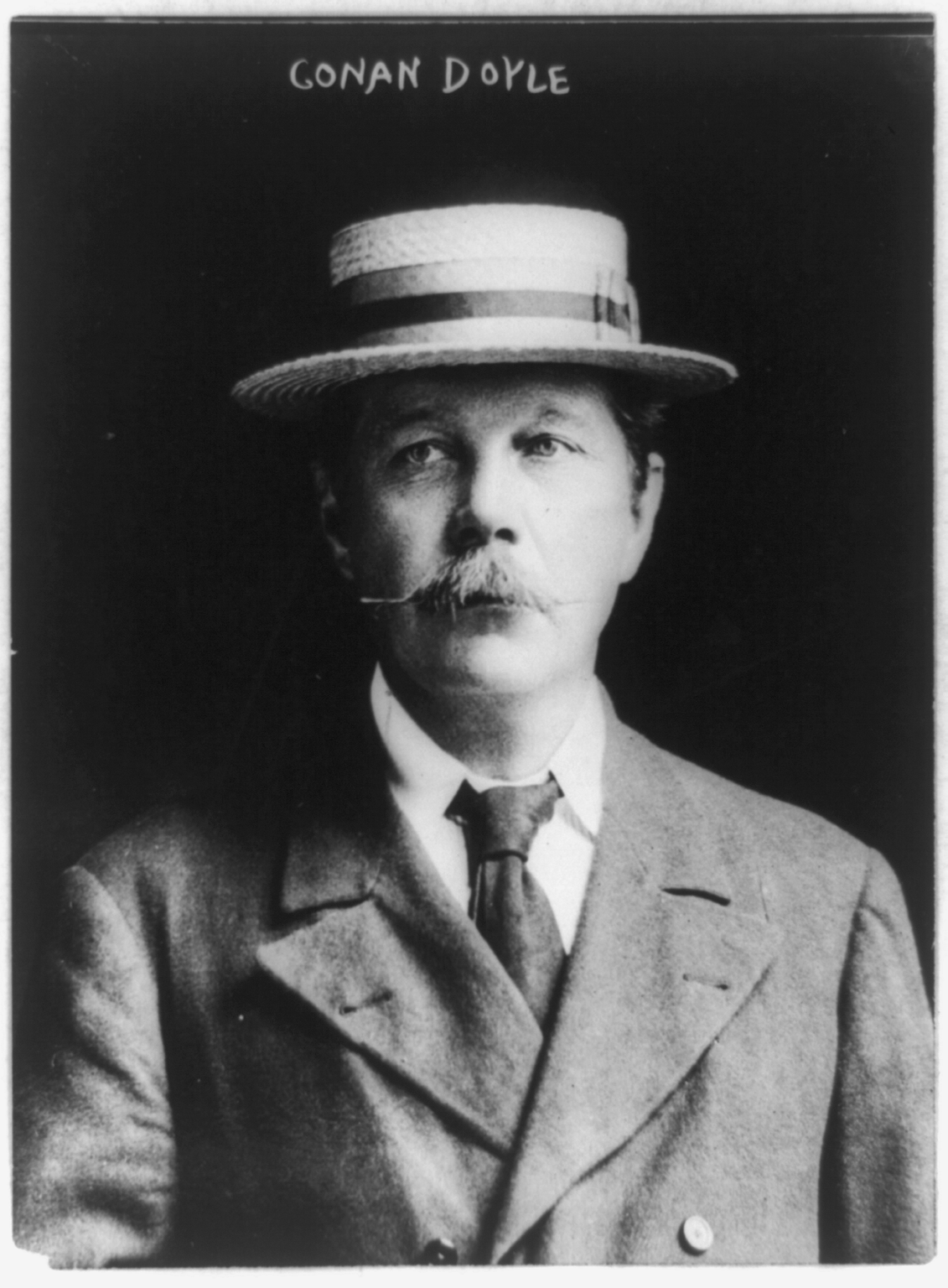
Arthur Conan Doyle, President of the Divorce Law Reform Union

Despite her own happy marriages, May Seaton-Tiedeman was extremely active as the honorary secretary of the Divorce Law Reform Union. The Union advocated for changes to existing divorce laws, achieving some of its aims with the passing of A. P. Herbert's Matrimonial Causes Act of 1937, which extended the grounds for divorce to include cruelty, desertion and incurable insanity. Although eclipsed by the Union's more famous figureheads, such as Arthur Conan Doyle and Lord Birkenhead, Seaton-Tiedeman worked tirelessly for the cause. She was described as 'a woman of tremendous dynamism and drive'. In the year of the Act's passing, friend and colleague A. D. Howell Smith wrote to The Times to redress her lack of recognition, noting

the strange silence of so many newspapers on the long sustained work of Mrs. Seaton-Tiedeman, the union's hon. secretary, without whom Mr. Herbert's Bill might well have miscarried. For 25 years, in season and out of season, by lectures and debates in many places (nearly every Sunday she has advocated her cause in Hyde Park), by correspondence in the Press, and by innumerable interviews, Mrs. Seaton-Tiedeman has worked for divorce law reform, sparing neither her health nor her purse.

In addition to lecturing and debating, Seaton-Tiedeman edited the quarterly paper of the Divorce Law Reform Union, The Journal, from 1919 to 1931. An active member of the Union of Ethical Societies, she spoke regularly at meetings of the Women's Group of the Ethical Movement, and assisted with the Ethical Societies' Chronicle. Cordelia Moyse notes that Seaton-Tiedeman was motivated

by her belief that immorality, injustice, and unnecessary human suffering were not to be tolerated... her secular humanism found its fullest expression in the divorce reform movement not least because the primary ideology of opponents of reform was Christianity.

Seaton-Tiedeman sought 'fair conditions for marriage and parenthood,' which she argued would be 'more efficacious than all the scolding we have heard from the pulpits of late years.' A focus on lessening the suffering of women in the case of marital breakdown and desertion could be clearly seen in Seaton-Tiedeman's writing in the cause of divorce law reform. In 1920, she argued that without amendments to the laws that disadvantaged them

Women will go on being deserted without the remotest possibility of being able, in a vast number of cases, either to trace the man or prove adultery — desertion which may cover long periods of years, with immense suffering to them, and which keeps them for ever tied to a husband who has gone out of their lives, leaving them often with his children to support.

In a deputation to Prime Minister Ramsay MacDonald in March 1924, Seaton-Tiedeman presented a case study 'typical of thousands of the cases that come to us':

A woman asked if she could get a divorce from her husband, and obtain the custody of her two children. She is 33, her husband has not co-habited with her since the birth of the second child, telling her that he has no further use for women, and boasting of his friendships with young men, but defying her to prove anything... Her health is breaking under this abominable cruelty... Her grief and horror were great when I informed her than not only could she not get a divorce, but that if she established the vice of her husband he might be committed to penal servitude for a period of years.

Even after the Matrimonial Causes Act 1937 was passed, the Union resolved to 'continue to agitate and organize for further amendment of the law... to give reasonable and equitable divorce.'

== Society for the Abolition of Blasphemy Laws ==
May Seaton-Tiedeman was part of delegations in 1924 and 1929 in which a case for the repeal of British blasphemy laws was presented to the Home Secretary. The Society believed that

The law of blasphemy is an attack on opinion; punishment for blasphemy becomes virtually a punishment for lack of education or taste; the law cannot prevent blasphemy; only the Church of England is protected by the law; many clergymen favour the repeal and genuinely indecent language would still be subject to ordinary law relating to disturbance of the peace.

== Trial of The Sexual Impulse ==
In 1935 Seaton-Tiedeman testified in defence of Edward Charles' An Introduction to the Study of the Psychology and Physiology and Bio-Chemistry of the Sex Impulse among Adults in Mental and Bodily Heath, a work facing prosecution under obscenity laws. The book included 'an exposition of coital technique intended for the ordinary educated man and woman'. Seaton-Tiedeman stated that 'in the light of fifty years' experience as a social worker, during the last twenty-three years of which she had had a special acquaintance with wrecked marriages as Honorary Secretary of the Divorce Law Reform Union, she considered the book of immense value for the preservation of marriage.'

== Death ==
After 1937, Seaton-Tiedeman continued to campaign for further reforms, the Union feeling that it must continue 'till other grounds [for divorce] were admitted', but retired during World War II. She died at Friern Hospital on 22 October 1948, and was cremated four days later. A memorial meeting was held for her at Conway Hall, led by H. J. Blackham, on the anniversary on her death. Tributes described Seaton-Tiedeman as an 'energetic worker for Divorce Law Reform', as well as 'an enthusiastic supporter of the Ethical Movement and other humanist activities.'
