= Matrimonial Causes Act 1907 =

Act of the Parliament of the United Kingdom

Matrimonial Causes Act 1907 (Note: Section 4.)
- Act of Parliament
- Parliament of the United Kingdom
- Long title: An Act to amend the Matrimonial Causes Acts, 1857 and 1866, by extending the powers of the Court in relation -to Maintenance and Alimony, and leave to intervene.
- Citation: 7 Edw. 7. c. 12
- Territorial extent: United Kingdom

Dates
- Royal assent: 9 August 1907
- Commencement: 9 August 1907 (Note: The Acts of Parliament (Commencement) Act 1793.)
- Repealed: 1 January 1926
Other legislation
Amends	Matrimonial Causes Act 1857; Matrimonial Causes Act 1866
Repealed by	Supreme Court of Judicature (Consolidation) Act 1925

Status: Repealed

Text of statute as originally enacted

The Matrimonial Causes Act 1907 (7 Edw. 7. c. 12) was an act of the Parliament of the United Kingdom that consolidated previous legislation relating to maintenance payments to separated and divorced women. It was designed in response to one cause of poverty amongst mothers and their children, marriage break-up. Support for the "endowment of motherhood" was also increased.

== Subsequent developments ==
The whole act was repealed by section 226(1) of, and the sixth schedule to the Supreme Court of Judicature (Consolidation) Act 1925 (15 & 16 Geo. 5. c. 49), which came into force on 1 January 1926.
