= Laws of William the Conqueror =

William the Conqueror, the first Norman King of England who reigned from 1066 until his death in 1087, created 10 laws for the English people to abide by after the Battle of Hastings.

== Laws ==
- The first law stated that "First that above all things he wishes one God to be revered throughout his whole realm, one faith in Christ to be kept ever inviolate, and peace and security to be preserved between English and Normans."
- The second law stated that every freeman shall make an oath that he will be loyal to king William and protect his lands.
- The third law stated that the Normans that he brought with him shall have peace and if any of them is murdered then the lord shall seize him.
- The fourth law stated that every Frenchman shall pay what they call Scot and lot.
- The fifth law stated that one could only sell cattle in a city with three credible witnesses.
- The sixth law stated that if a Norman shall charge an Englishman with a crime, then the Englishman can defend himself in such manner as he prefers: with either a hot iron or a battle.
- The seventh law stated that people shall follow the laws of King Edward the Confessor in respect to lands and possessions.
- The eighth law stated that "Every man who wishes to be considered a freeman shall be in pledge so that his surety shall hold him and hand him over to justice if he shall offend in any way."
- The ninth law stated that the sale of a man to anyone outside of the country would incur a fine payable in full to William.
- The tenth law stated that none shall be hanged or slain for any crime. Instead they were to be blinded and castrated. If violated then they shall pay a fine to William.
