= South Carolina Code of Laws =

The South Carolina Code of Laws, also SC Code of Laws, is the compendium of all laws in the U.S. state of South Carolina. Divided into 63 titles, the code provides a legal interpretation of all rights and punishments to all citizens of South Carolina.

== History ==
=== Record of Law in the Colonial Period ===
The English Royal Charter of March 1663 that handed the eight Lords' Proprietors of Carolina the land composing of modern-day North Carolina, South Carolina, and Georgia spurred an actual colonizing expedition and the drafting of a founding constitution. In 1670 Proprietor Lord Anthony Ashley Cooper and famed philosopher John Locke combined to realize the first revised colonial constitution accepted by the body Proprietorship. The importance to legal history of this first constitution is that it actually banned legal practice as a profession and sought to simplify legal dictates so that under educated nobles could run the colony effectively. The 1670 constitution banned legal commentary and established eight administrative courts whose aristocratic members composed part of a Grand Council that would prepare legislation produced in the colony's parliament. The journal of the Grand Council would, due to that body's power, become the first legislative record of the Carolina colony but also contains judicial rulings and executive actions undertaken due to the council's fiat. Chief Justice Nicholas Trott compiled the first comprehensive record of parliamentary statutes in 1712 which covered all the preceding years from 1682, with the majority being English common law statutes that could still apply in a vastly different environment. The collection of South Carolina colonial and state laws released by Judge John Grimke in 1790 includes the record from before Trott's time in office up until the formation of the United States.

=== Record of Law between Independence and the American Civil War ===
The next compendium of South Carolina law would be gathered and edited by legal reformer Dr. Thomas Cooper. Cooper acted under a resolution passed by the General Assembly in December 1834 to "compile under his direction the statute law of the state, now of force". Cooper commented of his task,

I am required to compile an edition of the Statute Law of South-Carolina: Is it to be an imperfect and mutilated edition of our public Law, or one that will answer the description of the 'Statutes at Large'? I have preferred the latter: because, it is better to insert somewhat too much than somewhat too little: because, the reasons for a present law, are often derived from, and the law itself elucidated by, the imperfections it is meant to supersede -.

Cooper died before the fifth volume went to the publisher leading to the appointment of Dr. David James Mccord by Governor Patrick Noble to finish the project. The tenth and final volume, an index, was published in 1841. Legislative year books published by the General Assembly would continue to proliferate, covering the time period from Mccord's work through the American Civil War. Volumes in the format seen of The Statutes at Large would have to wait until after the massive upheaval of the 1860s, to be added for the collective educational benefit of South Carolina's legal community.

== Titles of the South Carolina Code of Laws 2016 ==
- Title 1 - Administration of the Government
- Title 2- General Assembly
- Title 3- U.S. Government, Agreements and Relations with
- Title 4- Counties
- Title 5- Municipal Corporations
- Title 6- Local Government: Provisions Applicable to Special Purpose Districts and Other Political Subdivisions
- Title 7- Elections
- Title 8- Public Officers and Employees
- Title 9- Retirement Systems
- Title 10- Public Buildings and Property
- Title 11- Public Finance
- Title 12- Taxation
- Title 13- Planning, Research and Development
- Title 14- Courts
- Title 15- Civil Remedies and Procedures
- Title 16- Crimes and Offenses
- Title 17- Criminal Procedures
- Title 18- Appeals
- Title 19- Evidence
- Title 20- Domestic Relations
- Title 21- Estates, Trusts, Fiduciaries
- Title 22- Magistrates and Constables
- Title 23- Law Enforcement and Public Safety
- Title 24- Corrections, Jails, Probations, Paroles and Pardons
- Title 25- Military, Civil Defense and Veteran Affairs
- Title 26- Notaries Public and Acknowledgements
- Title 27- Property and Conveyances
- Title 28- Eminent Domain
- Title 29- Mortgages and Other Liens
- Title 30- Public Records
- Title 31- Housing and Redevelopment
- Title 32- Contracts and Agents
- Title 33- Corporations, Partnerships, and Associations
- Title 34- Banking, Financial Institutions, and Money
- Title 35- Securities
- Title 36- Commercial Code
- Title 37- Consumer Protection Code
- Title 38- Insurance
- Title 39- Trade and Commerce
- Title 40- Professions and Occupations
- Title 41- Labor and Employment
- Title 42- Workers' Compensation
- Title 43- Social Services
- Title 44- Health
- Title 45- Hotels, Motels, Restaurants and Boardinghouses
- Title 46- Agriculture
- Title 47- Animals, Livestock and Poultry
- Title 48- Environmental Protection and Conservation
- Title 49- Waters, Water Resources and Drainage
- Title 50- Fish, Game and Watercraft
- Title 51- Parks, Recreation and Tourism
- Title 52- Amusements and Athletic Contests
- Title 53- Sundays, Holidays and Other Special Days
- Title 54- Ports and Maritime Matters
- Title 55- Aeronautics
- Title 56- Motor Vehicles
- Title 57- Highways, Bridges and Ferries
- Title 58- Public Utilities, Services and Carriers
- Title 59- Education
- Title 60- Libraries, Archives, Museums and Arts
- Title 61- Alcohol and Alcoholic Beverages
- Title 62- South Carolina Probate Code
- Title 63- South Carolina Children's Code*

* Chapter 19 Articles 1-23 established the South Carolina Department of Juvenile Justice and outlined the means and methods by which minors in the state can be prosecuted and subsequently incarcerated if convicted. This chapter was a part of South Carolina House Bill H.4747, passed in 2008, that established the Children's Code so as to combine aspects of the extant South Carolina Family Court, child crime, and child support statutes.
