= Matrimonial Causes Act 1965 =

Act of the Parliament of the United Kingdom

Matrimonial Causes Act 1965 (Note: Section 46(1).)
- Act of Parliament
- Parliament of the United Kingdom
- Long title: An Act to consolidate certain enactments relating to matrimonial causes, maintenance and declarations of legitimacy and British nationality, with corrections and improvements made under the Consolidation of Enactments (Procedure) Act 1949.
- Citation: 1965 c. 72
- Territorial extent: England and Wales (Note: Section 46(4).)

Dates
- Royal assent: 8 November 1965
- Commencement: 1 January 1966 (Note: Section 46(3).)

Other legislation
- Amends: See § Repealed enactments
- Repeals/revokes: See § Repealed enactments
- Amended by: Family Provision Act 1966; Family Law Reform Act 1969; Law Reform (Miscellaneous Provisions) Act 1970; Nullity of Marriage Act 1971; Matrimonial Causes Act 1973; Inheritance (Provision for Family and Dependants) Act 1975; Statute Law (Repeals) Act 1976; Statute Law (Repeals) Act 1977; Domestic Proceedings and Magistrates' Courts Act 1978; Police and Criminal Evidence Act 1984

Status: Partially repealed

Text of statute as originally enacted

Revised text of statute as amended

Text of the Matrimonial Causes Act 1965 as in force today (including any amendments) within the United Kingdom, from legislation.gov.uk.

The Matrimonial Causes Act 1965 (c. 72) is an act of the Parliament of the United Kingdom that consolidated enactments relating to matrimonial causes, maintenance, and declarations of legitimacy and British nationality in England and Wales.

== Provisions ==
=== Repealed enactments ===
Section 45 of the act repealed 12 enactments, listed in schedule 2 to the act.

Citation	Short title	Extent of repeal
49 & 50 Vict. c. 27	Guardianship of Infants Act 1886	Section 7.
14 Geo. 6. c. 25	Matrimonial Causes Act 1950	The whole act.
4 & 5 Eliz. 2. c. 46	Administration of Justice Act 1956	Section 31(2).
5 & 6 Eliz. 2. c. 35	Maintenance Agreements Act 1957	The whole act.
6 & 7 Eliz. 2. c. 35	Matrimonial Causes (Property and Maintenance) Act 1958	Sections 1 to 6 and the Schedule.
6 & 7 Eliz. 2. c. 40	Matrimonial Proceedings (Children) Act 1958	The whole act, except sections 17 and 18. In section 17, the words from "and in" onwards. Section 18(4).
6 & 7 Eliz. 2. c. 54	Divorce (Insanity and Desertion) Act 1958	The whole act.
7 & 8 Eliz. 2. c. 72	Mental Health Act 1959	In Schedule 7, the entry relating to the Matrimonial Causes Act 1950.
7 & 8 Eliz. 2. c. 73	Legitimacy Act 1959	Section 2(6).
8 & 9 Eliz. 2. c. 61	Mental Health (Scotland) Act 1960	In Schedule 4, the entry relating to the Matrimonial Causes Act 1950.
10 & 11 Eliz. 2. c. 21	Commonwealth Immigrants Act 1962	In section 20(1), the words from the beginning to "1950 and".
1963 c. 45	Matrimonial Causes Act 1963	The whole act.

== Subsequent developments ==
Most provisions of the act were repealed by section 54(1)(b) of, and schedule 3 to, the Matrimonial Causes Act 1973, which came into force on 1 January 1974. Sections 26 to 28A were subsequently repealed by sections 26 and 27(3) of, and the schedule to, the Inheritance (Provision for Family and Dependants) Act 1975. Section 38 was repealed by the Statute Law (Repeals) Act 1976, and words in section 46(4) were repealed by the Statute Law (Repeals) Act 1977. Section 42 was repealed by schedule 3 to the Domestic Proceedings and Magistrates' Courts Act 1978, and section 43(1) was repealed by the Police and Criminal Evidence Act 1984. Section 8(2), which provides that no clergyman of the Church of England or the Church in Wales shall be compelled to solemnise the marriage of a person whose former marriage has been dissolved and whose former spouse is still living, remains in force.

Section 38 of the act was repealed by section 1(1) of, and part I of schedule 1 to, the Statute Law (Repeals) Act 1976, which came into force on 27 May 1976.
