= Matrimonial Causes Act 1937 =

Act of the Parliament of the United Kingdom

Matrimonial Causes Act 1937 (Note: Section 14(1).)
- Act of Parliament
- Parliament of the United Kingdom
- Long title: An Act to amend the law relating to marriage and divorce.
- Citation: 1 Edw. 8. & 1 Geo. 6. c. 57
- Introduced by: A. P. Herbert (Commons)
- Territorial extent: England and Wales (Note: Section 14(3).)

Dates
- Royal assent: 30 July 1937
- Commencement: 1 January 1938 (Note: Section 14(2).)
- Repealed: 1 January 1961
Other legislation
Amends	Supreme Court of Judicature (Consolidation) Act 1925
Amended by	Law Reform (Miscellaneous Provisions) Act 1949
Repealed by	Matrimonial Causes Act 1950; Matrimonial Proceedings (Magistrates' Courts) Act 1960

Status: Repealed

Text of statute as originally enacted

The Matrimonial Causes Act 1937 (1 Edw. 8. & 1 Geo. 6. c. 57) was an act of the Parliament of the United Kingdom on divorce in the United Kingdom. It extended the grounds for divorce, which until then only included adultery, to include unlawful desertion for three years or more, cruelty, and incurable insanity, incest or sodomy.

Apart from the Church of England, its associated Mothers' Union, and the Roman Catholic Church, there was broad support for divorce law liberalization, for this legislation had not been significantly amended since the passage of the Matrimonial Causes Act 1857 (20 & 21 Vict. c. 85) – when adjudication had been removed from church courts and placed before secular courts.

== Women's Rights and Legal Context ==
The reasoning for a new Matrimonial Causes Act was to change the standards originally set by an act in 1857, which only allowed for divorce when adultery was proven. There were also many amending acts for women's general rights at the time.

The Married Women's Property Act of 1870 granted women the right to keep their earnings and wages from any personal skill that might have brought them value. Then, the Married Women's Property Act of 1882 gave married women the right of feme sole, allowing them to own property without a tie to their husband.

This ultimately lead to the question of why women weren't given equal access to divorce but only matrimonial property. Despite all these acts, there remained significant social inequality. Some women were also starting to talk more openly about the expectation of happiness within marriage. In 1918, Marie Stopes wrote a book telling the story of her ignorance around sex in her marriage and aimed to enlighten married couples on the issue.

This created an uproar of response from not only women, but men too who felt they had the same issue and wanted guidance. Although, many still saw ignorance as a form of protection, claiming that women who were uneducated on the matter were morally innocent. Society taught women to strive for this purity.

== Origins ==
Previously, before the Matrimonial Causes Act 1923, men could divorce women on the basis of adultery, but women were required to prove that their male partners had undertaken adultery and additional offences, such as incest, sodomy, cruelty (roughly equivalent to domestic violence) and other possible reasons. An example of how a woman would prove this is would be a signature from a hotel register, which detectives would then give proof of a man staying in that hotel with a woman who was not the wife. With divorce being such a long legal process, it was necessary to hone in on what proof was required, and then how to go about using that proof smoothly.

In 1912, a royal commission had recommended further liberalization. Although, a minority report by Archbishop Cosmo Gordon Lang, Sir William Anson and Sir Lewis Dibdin dissented, showing that among experts the matter was still controversial.

In 1923, the feminist-allied National Union of Societies for Equal Citizenship promoted a more equitable treatment of divorce law which made it easier for women to seek divorce, also known as the Matrimonial Causes Act 1923. This act benefited women, which led to the idea of generally extending the grounds for divorce on both sides. Despite the act, nothing was done at that time to broaden grounds for divorce from adultery alone, to include permanent desertion of one's partner and family, and incurable and severe mental illness.

== A. P. Herbert ==
A. P. Herbert (1890–1971) had previously been a lawyer and non-fiction author who specialized in legal matters, before he focused his attention on the question of divorce law reform. His best-selling novel Holy Deadlock (1934) may have galvanized public opinion on the issue.

His novel, along with others, such as Evelyn Waugh's A Handful of Dust were both satirical. They questioned the idea of a hotel divorce, where husband and wife would work together to prove adultery in their marriage, even if it had never actually been committed. The novels also criticized the King's (or Queen's) Proctor, which is a legal official who represents the crown. The King's proctor would force themselves into private affairs if there was suspicion of collusion, making the terms for divorce even more strict.

When a vacancy occurred in the House of Commons upon the resignation of the Conservative Sir Charles Oman, Herbert was elected as an Independent MP for the Oxford University constituency in November 1935.

== 1937 ==
After two fruitless years in which Herbert's private member's bill languished in the ballot box, he sought the assistance of the Conservative Party MP for Evesham, Rupert de la Bère. His draft legislation had been scrupulously prepared and it met with considerable public support and few obstacles. On its second reading, the Matrimonial Causes Bill passed 78-12. Prime Minister Stanley Baldwin provided a day for the bill's third reading, which led to its successful passage (190-37). Following the Bill's success, A. D. Howell Smith wrote to The Times to highlight the work of campaigner May Seaton-Tiedeman in achieving the long awaited reform, noting:

the strange silence of so many newspapers on the long sustained work of Mrs. Seaton-Tiedeman, the union's hon. secretary, without whom Mr. Herbert's Bill might well have miscarried. For 25 years, in season and out of season, by lectures and debates in many places (nearly every Sunday she has advocated her cause in Hyde Park), by correspondence in the Press, and by innumerable interviews, Mrs. Seaton-Tiedeman has worked for divorce law reform, sparing neither her health nor her purse.

The House of Lords proved compliant, and even liberalised the bill, shortening the time for desertion to two years, apart from instances of "hardship" and "depravity". However, it remained otherwise unchanged, with instant divorce for demonstrable adultery of either partner, as well for desertion after two years, or five years if the context was severe mental illness.

The law went into effect on 1 January 1938 after being given royal assent on 30 July 1937.

== Subsequent developments ==
The whole act, except section 11, was repealed by section 34(1) of, and the schedule to, the Matrimonial Causes Act 1950 (14 Geo. 6. c. 25), which came into force on 1 January 1951.

Section 11 of the act was repealed by section 18(1) of, and the schedule to, the Matrimonial Proceedings (Magistrates' Courts) Act 1960 (8 & 9 Eliz. 2. c. 48), which came into force on 1 January 1961.

== See also ==
- Matrimonial Causes Act 1857

== Bibliography ==
- Geoffrey Best: "The Father of the Permissive Society" History Today: 59(6): June 2009: 40-42.
- A.P Herbert: Holy Deadlock: London: Methuen: 1934.
- A.P Herbert: The Ayes Have It : the story of the Marriage Bill: London: Methuen: 1937.
- Lawrence Stone: Roads to Divorce: England 1530-1987: Oxford: Oxford University Press: 1990.
