= Law Reform (Miscellaneous Provisions) Act 1970 =

Act of the Parliament of the United Kingdom

Law Reform (Miscellaneous Provisions) Act 1970 (Note: Section 7(1).)
- Act of Parliament
- Parliament of the United Kingdom
- Long title: An Act to abolish actions for breach of promise of marriage and make provision with respect to the property of, and gifts between, persons who have been engaged to marry; to abolish the right of a husband to claim damages for adultery with his wife; to abolish actions for the enticement or harbouring of a spouse, or for the enticement, seduction or harbouring of a child; to make provision with respect to the maintenance of survivors of void marriages; and for purposes connected with the matters aforesaid.
- Citation: 1970 c. 33
- Territorial extent: England and Wales (Note: Section 7(4).)

Dates
- Royal assent: 29 May 1970
- Commencement: 1 January 1971 (Note: Section 7(3).)

Other legislation
- Amends: Matrimonial Causes Act 1965; Family Law Reform Act 1969; See § Repealed enactments
- Amended by: Matrimonial Causes Act 1973; Inheritance (Provision for Family and Dependants) Act 1975; Crime and Courts Act 2013

Status: Amended

Text of statute as originally enacted

Revised text of statute as amended

Text of the Law Reform (Miscellaneous Provisions) Act 1970 as in force today (including any amendments) within the United Kingdom, from legislation.gov.uk.

The Law Reform (Miscellaneous Provisions) Act 1970 (c. 33) is an act of the Parliament of the United Kingdom that abolished actions for breach of promise of marriage and made provision with respect to the property of, and gifts between, persons who had been engaged to marry; abolished the right of a husband to claim damages for adultery; and abolished actions for the enticement or harbouring of a spouse or child, in England and Wales.

== Provisions ==
Sections 1 to 3 of the act concern the legal consequences of the termination of an engagement to marry in England and Wales. Section 1 provides that an agreement to marry shall not have effect as a contract giving rise to legal rights, and that no action shall lie for breach of such an agreement. Section 2 applies property rules (including those under section 17 of the Married Women's Property Act 1882 (45 & 46 Vict. c. 75)) to property in which either party to an engagement had a beneficial interest. Section 3 creates a rebuttable presumption that the gift of an engagement ring is an absolute gift. Section 5 abolishes liability in tort for inducing a spouse to leave or remain apart from the other spouse, and for the harbouring, enticement, or seduction of a spouse or child.

=== Repealed enactments ===
Section 7(2) of the act repealed 6 enactments, listed in the schedule to the act.

| Citation | Short title | Extent of repeal |
|---|---|---|
| 32 & 33 Vict. c. 68 | Evidence Further Amendment Act 1869 | Section 2. |
| 23 & 24 Geo. 5. c. 36 | Administration of Justice (Miscellaneous Provisions) Act 1933 | In section 6(1)(b), the words "or breach of promise of marriage". |
| 24 & 25 Geo. 5. c. 41 | Law Reform (Miscellaneous Provisions) Act 1934 | In section 1(1), the words from "or for inducing" to the end; and section 1(2)(b). |
| 12, 13 & 14 Geo. 6. c. 51 | Legal Aid and Advice Act 1949 | In Part II of Schedule 1, paragraph 1(b) and (d). |
| 7 & 8 Eliz. 2. c. 22 | County Courts Act 1959 | In section 39(1)(c), and in section 94(3)(b), the words "or breach of promise of marriage". |
| 1965 c. 72 | Matrimonial Causes Act 1965 | Section 41. |
| 1965 c. 72 | Matrimonial Causes Act 1965 | Section 46(2) so far as it applies for the interpretation of section 41(3) of that Act. |

== Subsequent developments ==
Section 4 of the act, which abolished the right of a husband to claim damages for adultery with his wife, was repealed by section 54(1) of, and schedule 3 to, the Matrimonial Causes Act 1973 (1973 c. 18), which came into force on 1 January 1974.

Section 6 of the act, which made provision with respect to the maintenance of survivors of void marriages, was repealed by section 26(2) of, and the schedule to, the Inheritance (Provision for Family and Dependants) Act 1975 (1975 c. 63).
