= In forma pauperis =

Legal term

In forma pauperis (/ɪn ˈfɔːrmə ˈpɔːpərɪs/; IFP or i.f.p.) is a Latin legal term meaning "in the character or manner of a pauper". It refers to the ability of an indigent person to proceed in court without payment of the usual fees associated with a lawsuit or appeal.

== United Kingdom ==
Suing in Forma Pauperis Act 1495
- Act of Parliament
- Parliament of England
- Long title: An Acte to admytt such persons as are poore to sue in formâ pauperis.
- Citation: 11 Hen. 7. c. 12
- Territorial extent: England and Wales

Dates
- Royal assent: 22 December 1495
- Commencement: 14 October 1495 (Note: Start of session.)
- Repealed: 18 July 1973
Other legislation
Amended by	Statute Law Revision and Civil Procedure Act 1883; Legal Aid and Advice Act 1949
Repealed by	Statute Law (Repeals) Act 1973
Relates to	Appeal (Formâ Pauperis) Act 1893

Status: Repealed

Text of statute as originally enacted

Appeal (Formâ Pauperis) Act 1893 (Note: Section 2.)
- Act of Parliament
- Parliament of the United Kingdom
- Long title: An Act to amend the Appellate Jurisdiction Act, 1876, so far as regards Appeals in Formâ Pauperis.
- Citation: 56 & 57 Vict. c. 22
- Territorial extent: United Kingdom

Dates
- Royal assent: 29 June 1893
- Commencement: 29 June 1893 (Note: The Acts of Parliament (Commencement) Act 1793.)
- Repealed: 18 July 1973
Other legislation
Amends	Appellate Jurisdiction Act 1876
Repealed by	Legal Aid and Advice Act 1949; Legal Aid and Solicitors (Scotland) Act 1949; Statute Law (Repeals) Act 1973
Relates to	Suing in Forma Pauperis Act 1495

Status: Repealed

Text of statute as originally enacted

The Suing in Forma Pauperis Act 1495 11 Hen. 7. c. 12 allowed any poor person having cause of action to bring a writ without paying the usual fees.

Appeals to the House of Lords in formâ pauperis were regulated by the Appeal (Formâ Pauperis) Act 1893 (56 & 57 Vict. c. 22), which gave the House of Lords power to refuse a petition for leave to sue.

IFP was abolished in the United Kingdom in favour of a legal aid approach as part of the Legal Aid and Advice Act 1949 (12, 13 & 14 Geo. 6. c. 51).

The two acts were repealed by section 1(1) of, and part XII of schedule 1 to, the Statute Law (Repeals) Act 1973, which came into force on 18 July 1973.

== United States ==
In the United States, the IFP designation is given by both state and federal courts to someone who is without the funds to pursue the normal costs of a lawsuit or a criminal defense. The status is usually granted by a judge without a hearing, and it entitles the person to a waiver of normal costs, and sometimes in criminal cases the appointment of counsel. While court-imposed costs such as filing fees are waived, the litigant is still responsible for other costs incurred in bringing the action such as deposition and witness fees. However, in federal court, a pauper can obtain free service of process through the United States Marshal's Service.

Approximately two-thirds of writ of certiorari petitions to the Supreme Court are filed in forma pauperis. Most of those petitioners are prisoners. Statistically, petitions that appear on the Supreme Court's in forma pauperis docket are substantially less likely to be granted review than others on the docket.

Gideon v. Wainwright, 372 U.S. 335 (1963), is a landmark case in United States Supreme Court history where in forma pauperis was invoked. In forma pauperis is usually granted in connection to pro se petitioners, but the two concepts are separate and distinct.

== See also ==
- Pauper's oath
