= Community Legal Advice =

Government funded legal advice in England

Community Legal Advice is a government-funded advice service in the United Kingdom set up by the Legal Services Commission as part of the Community Legal Service. It aims to help people in England and Wales deal with civil legal problems, and is part of the legal aid programme in those nations.

It comprises a telephone helpline, advice centres and a series of advice leaflets. Its services also previously included an informational website whose functions were taken over by the Ministry of Justice site in February 2011. See: www.legalservices.gov.uk/public/community_legal_advice_helpline.asp

Until November 2008 the service was known as Community Legal Service Direct, and before that as "Just Ask!"

== Telephone helpline ==
The Community Legal Advice telephone helpline gives specific, independent advice to people living on benefits or low income.

Community Legal Advice covers six legal areas:

- Debt
- Welfare benefits and tax credits
- Housing
- Employment
- Education
- Family

== Website ==
The Community Legal Advice website provided self-help information and tools to help people deal with common legal problems themselves. It included advice on areas of law not covered by the telephone helpline such as consumer law, health and social care. By February 2011 (like the online services of the Department for Constitutional Affairs in 2007), it was absorbed by the Department of Justice website. The original CLA site remains readable in "snapshots" in the National Archives.

== Community Legal Advice Centres ==
The Legal Services Commission also operates walk-in Community Legal Advice Centres. Centres give free, generalized, face-to-face legal advice at an initial appointment and further specialized advice for people eligible for legal aid.

Five Community Legal Advice Centres have been opened in

- Derby
- Gateshead
- Hull
- Leicester
- Portsmouth

Centres are jointly funded by the Legal Services Commission and local councils.
