= Legal Aid and Advice Act 1949 =

Act of the Parliament of the United Kingdom

Legal Aid and Advice Act 1949 (Note: Section 27(1).)
- Act of Parliament
- Parliament of the United Kingdom
- Long title: An Act to make legal aid and advice in England and Wales, and in the case of members of the forces legal advice elsewhere, more readily available for persons of small or moderate means, to enable the cost of legal aid or advice for such persons to be defrayed wholly or partly out of moneys provided by Parliament, and for purposes connected therewith.
- Citation: 12, 13 & 14 Geo. 6. c. 51
- Introduced by: Hartley Shawcross MP, Attorney General (Commons); Earl Jowitt, Lord Chancellor (Lords)
- Territorial extent: England and Wales (Note: Section 1(1).)

Dates
- Royal assent: 30 July 1949
- Commencement: various (Note: Section 24(1).)
- Repealed: 8 May 1974
Other legislation
Amended by	Legal Aid Act 1960; Charities Act 1960; Rent Act 1965; Law Reform (Miscellaneous Provisions) Act 1970; Courts Act 1971; Statute Law (Repeals) Act 1973
Repealed by	Legal Aid Act 1974
Relates to	Legal Aid and Solicitors (Scotland) Act 1949

Status: Repealed

Text of statute as originally enacted

The Legal Aid and Advice Act 1949 (12, 13 & 14 Geo. 6. c. 51) was an act of the Parliament of the United Kingdom which extended the welfare state so that those unable to pay for a solicitor were further able to access free legal help. It set up one of the first ever state funded legal aid systems in the UK. Its precursor was the Poor Prisoners' Defence Act 1930 which introduced criminal legal aid for appearances in magistrates' courts. It received royal assent on 30 July 1949 creating one system for claiming legal aid in England and Wales. The assistance was means tested but freely available to people of "small or moderate means". The responsibility for legal aid was given to the Law Society of England and Wales. This function was later transferred to the Legal Aid Board by the Legal Aid Act 1988. The board was replaced by Legal Services Commission through Access to Justice Act 1999.

== Subsequent developments ==
The act was described by Lord Beecham as "one of the great pillars of the post war welfare state",

The whole act was repealed by section 42(1) of, and part I of schedule 5 to, the Legal Aid Act 1974, which came into force on 8 May 1974.

This act's scope was substantially reduced following the contested Legal Aid, Sentencing and Punishment of Offenders Act 2012.
