= Legal Aid (Scotland) Act 1967 =

Act of the Parliament of the United Kingdom

Legal Aid (Scotland) Act 1967 (Note: Section 22(1).)
- Act of Parliament
- Parliament of the United Kingdom
- Long title: An Act to consolidate certain enactments relating to legal aid and advice in Scotland and connected matters.
- Citation: 1967 c. 43
- Territorial extent: United Kingdom

Dates
- Royal assent: 14 July 1967
- Commencement: 14 July 1967 (Note: Section 22(2). Certain provisions came into operation on a day appointed by the Secretary of State under section 22(3).)
- Repealed: 1 April 1987 (Note: The Legal Aid (Scotland) Act 1986 (Commencement No. 2) Order 1987 (SI 1987/289).)
Other legislation
Amends	See § Repealed enactments
Repeals/revokes	See § Repealed enactments
Amended by	Law Reform (Miscellaneous Provisions) (Scotland) Act 1980; Law Reform (Miscellaneous Provisions) (Scotland) Act 1985
Repealed by	Legal Aid (Scotland) Act 1986
Relates to	Legal Aid Act 1974

Status: Repealed

Text of statute as originally enacted

The Legal Aid (Scotland) Act 1967 (c. 43) was an act of the Parliament of the United Kingdom that consolidated enactments relating to legal aid and advice in Scotland.

== Provisions ==
=== Repealed enactments ===
Section 21(1) of the act repealed 5 enactments, listed in schedule 3 to the act, as far as they related to Scotland.

Enactments repealed by section 21(1)
Citation	Short title	Extent of repeal
12, 13 & 14 Geo. 6. c. 63	Legal Aid and Solicitors (Scotland) Act 1949	The whole act.
8 & 9 Eliz. 2. c. 28	Legal Aid Act 1960	The whole act.
1963 c. 39	Criminal Justice (Scotland) Act 1963	Section 48, Schedule 4.
1964 c. 30	Legal Aid Act 1964	The whole act.
1966 c. 20	Ministry of Social Security Act 1966	In Schedule 6, paragraph 13.

== Subsequent developments ==
The whole act was repealed by section 45(3) of, and schedule 5 to, the Legal Aid (Scotland) Act 1986, which came into force on 1 April 1987.
