= Law Reform (Miscellaneous Provisions) (Scotland) Act 1990 =

Act of the Parliament of the United Kingdom

Law Reform (Miscellaneous Provisions) (Scotland) Act 1990 (Note: Section 75(1).)
- Act of Parliament
- Parliament of the United Kingdom
- Long title: An Act, as respects Scotland, to make new provision for the regulation of charities; to provide for the establishment of a board having functions in connection with the provision of conveyancing and executry services by persons other than solicitors, advocates and incorporated practices; to provide as to rights of audience in courts of law, legal services and judicial appointments, and for the establishment and functions of an ombudsman in relation to legal services; to amend the law relating to liquor licensing; to make special provision in relation to the giving of evidence by children in criminal trials; to empower a sheriff court to try offences committed in the district of a different sheriff court in the same sheriffdom; to provide as to probation and community service orders and the supervision and care of persons on probation and on release from prison and for supervised attendance as an alternative to imprisonment on default in paying a fine; to amend Part I of the Criminal Justice (Scotland) Act 1987 with respect to the registration and enforcement of confiscation orders in relation to the proceeds of drug trafficking; to amend section 24 of the Housing (Scotland) Act 1987; to provide a system for the settlement by arbitration of international commercial disputes; to amend Part II of the Unfair Contract Terms Act 1977; and to make certain other miscellaneous reforms of the law.
- Citation: 1990 c. 40
- Territorial extent: Scotland (Note: Section 75(5)–(7).)

Dates
- Royal assent: 1 November 1990
- Commencement: various (Note: Section 75(2)–(4).)
Other legislation
Amends	Promissory Oaths Act 1868; Unfair Contract Terms Act 1977; Solicitors (Scotland) Act 1980; Legal Aid (Scotland) Act 1986; Law Reform (Parent and Child) (Scotland) Act 1986; Legal Aid Act 1988; See § Repealed enactments
Amended by	Scottish Land Court Act 1993; Antarctic Act 1994; Insurance Companies (Third Insurance Directives) Regulations 1994; Local Government etc. (Scotland) Act 1994; Criminal Justice (Scotland) Act 1995; Criminal Procedure (Consequential Provisions) (Scotland) Act 1995; Requirements of Writing (Scotland) Act 1995; Liquor Licensing (Fees) (Scotland) Order 1997; Scottish Legal Services Ombudsman and Commissioner for Local Administration in Scotland Act 1997; Scotland Act 1998 (Consequential Modifications) (No. 2) Order 1999; Adults with Incapacity (Scotland) Act 2000; Enterprise Act 2002 (Consequential and Supplemental Provisions) Order 2003; Public Appointments and Public Bodies etc. (Scotland) Act 2003; Antisocial Behaviour etc. (Scotland) Act 2004; Insolvency Act 2000 (Company Directors Disqualification Undertakings) Order 2004; Charities and Trustee Investment (Scotland) Act 2005; Licensing (Scotland) Act 2005; Charities and Trustee Investment (Scotland) Act 2005 (Consequential Provisions and Modifications) Order 2006; Legal Profession and Legal Aid (Scotland) Act 2007; Legal Services Act 2007; Judiciary and Courts (Scotland) Act 2008; Legal Profession and Legal Aid (Scotland) Act 2007 (Transitional, Savings and Consequential Provisions) Order 2008; Arbitration (Scotland) Act 2010; Legal Services (Scotland) Act 2010; Legal Profession and Legal Aid (Scotland) Act 2007 (Modification and Consequential Provisions) Order 2011; Enterprise and Regulatory Reform Act 2013; Courts Reform (Scotland) Act 2014; Scottish Legal Complaints Commission (Modification of Duties and Powers) Regulations 2014; Civil Litigation (Expenses and Group Proceedings) (Scotland) Act 2018; Judicial Factors (Scotland) Act 2025; Regulation of Legal Services (Scotland) Act 2025

Status: Amended

Text of statute as originally enacted

Revised text of statute as amended

Text of the Law Reform (Miscellaneous Provisions) (Scotland) Act 1990 as in force today (including any amendments) within the United Kingdom, from legislation.gov.uk.

The Law Reform (Miscellaneous Provisions) (Scotland) Act 1990 (c. 40) is an act of the Parliament of the United Kingdom dealing with a variety of matters relating to Scottish law.

== Overview ==
Amongst other things the legislation addresses:

- regulation of charities;
- regulation of conveyancing services by non-solicitors;
- rights of audience in court;
- an ombudsman for legal services;
- liquor licensing;
- the giving of evidence by children in criminal trials;
- jurisdiction of the sheriff court to try offences committed in another district;
- probation and community service orders;
- amendments to the Criminal Justice (Scotland) Act 1987 relating to confiscation orders;
- amendments to the Housing (Scotland) Act 1987;
- arbitration of international commercial disputes;
- amendments to the Unfair Contract Terms Act 1977; and
- other miscellaneous reforms of the law.

== Arbitration ==
Section 66 of the act provides for the UNCITRAL Model Law on International Commercial Arbitration to apply to Scotland. The Model Law itself is set out in schedule 7 to the act.

== Provisions ==
=== Repealed enactments ===
Section 74(2) of the act repealed 21 enactments, listed in schedule 9 to the act.

Citation	Short title	Extent of repeal
48 Geo. 3. c. 149	Probate and Legacy Duties Act 1808	In section 38, the words from "(which oath" to "administer)".
21 & 22 Vict. c. 56	Confirmation of Executors (Scotland) Act 1858	Section 11.
38 & 39 Vict. c. 41	Intestates Widows and Children (Scotland) Act 1875	In section 6, the words from the beginning to "affirmations.". In Schedule A, the words from "All which" to the end.
39 & 40 Vict. c. 24	Small Testate Estates (Scotland) Act 1876	Section 6. In Schedule A, the words from "All which" to the end.
63 & 64 Vict. c. 55	Executors (Scotland) Act 1900	Section 8.
7 Edw. 7. c. 51	Sheriff Courts (Scotland) Act 1907	In section 40, the words from "agents" to "1967)".
1975 c. 24	House of Commons Disqualification Act 1975	In Schedule 1, the words "lay observer appointed under section 49 of the Solicitors (Scotland) Act 1980".
1976 c. 66	Licensing (Scotland) Act 1976	In section 6, the words from "Provided that" to the end of the subsection. In section 18, in subsection (1), the words from "when" to the end. Section 55. Section 61. In section 97(2), the words "or supply". Sections 131 and 132. In section 133(4), the words "and (6)". In Schedule 4, in paragraph 1, the words from "as" to "Act", paragraphs 12, 13 and 14, in paragraph 15, the words "or 12 above", paragraphs 16, 17 and 19 to 22.
1977 c. 50	Unfair Contract Terms Act 1977	In section 15(1), the words "applies only to contracts,". In section 25, subsections (3)(d) and (4).
1980 c. 46	Solicitors (Scotland) Act 1980	In section 20(1), the word "and". Section 27. Section 29. Section 31(3). Section 49. In section 63(1), the words "and to imprisonment for a period not exceeding one month". In section 65(1), the definition of "lay observer". In Schedule 4, in paragraph 1, the words "appointed by the Lord President" following sub-paragraph (b), and in paragraph 17, the words from "also" to "before the order" and the words from "and in such other manner" to the end. Schedule 5.
1981 c. 59	Matrimonial Homes (Family Protection) (Scotland) Act 1981	In section 6(3)(e), the words ", at or before the time of the dealing,". In section 8, in subsection (2), the words "before the granting of the loan", and in subsection (2A), the words "at or before the granting of the security".
1983 c. 2	Representation of the People Act 1983	Section 42(3)(b).
1983 c. 12	Divorce Jurisdiction, Court Fees and Legal Aid (Scotland) Act 1983	In Schedule 1, paragraph 7.
1985 c. 6	Companies Act 1985	In section 38(1), the words "under the law of England and Wales". In section 39(3), the words "or, in the case of a company registered in Scotland, subscribed in accordance with section 36B,". In section 186, the words "(or, in the case of a company registered in Scotland, subscribed in accordance with section 36B)". In section 188(2), the words "(or, in the case of a company registered in Scotland, subscribed in accordance with section 36B)". Section 462(2).
1985 c. 37	Family Law (Scotland) Act 1985	In section 8(1)(a), the words "or the transfer of property".
1985 c. 73	Law Reform (Miscellaneous Provisions) (Scotland) Act 1985	In Part I of Schedule 1, paragraphs 4 and 5.
1986 c. 45	Insolvency Act 1986	Section 53(3).
1986 c. 47	Legal Aid (Scotland) Act 1986	In section 4(3), paragraph (a) and, in paragraph (b), the words "a court". In section 13(2), the words "(so far as is necessary)". Section 17(3) to (5). In section 33(3), in paragraph (c), the words "and taxation" and "or taxation", and, in paragraph (d), the word ", taxation".
1988 c. 34	Legal Aid Act 1988	In paragraph 3 of Schedule 4, sub-paragraphs (b) and (c).
1988 c. 36	Court of Session Act 1988	Section 5(g).
1989 c. 40	Companies Act 1989	Section 130(3). In Schedule 17, paragraphs 1(2), 2(4), 8 and 10.
