= Legal Aid Board =

Former England & Wales Government NDPB (1989-2000)

The Legal Aid Board (LAB) was a non-departmental public body of the Lord Chancellor's Department in the United Kingdom that administered legal aid in England and Wales from 1989 to 2000.

== Overview ==
The LAB was established under the Legal Aid Act 1988 to administer legal aid in England and Wales. It took over responsibility from The Law Society of England and Wales, which had administered legal aid since 1949 under the Legal Aid and Advice Act 1949.

The Lord Chancellor's Department 1987 White Paper set out the planned reforms: "Legal Aid in England and Wales: A New Framework" (cm 118).

A shadow Legal Aid Board was set up in 1987. Its records are held in the National Archive. The LAB began operating on 1 April 1989 (SI 1989/287). Existing staff and offices were transferred from The Law Society. A new Chief Executive was appointed, Steve Orchard, bringing an extensive knowledge of the law from his long career in the court service.

The LAB was administered from a Head Office in London, and 13 area offices. The teams in these offices managed civil casework, civil finance, criminal bills, and franchising. The offices were in: Birmingham, Brighton, Bristol, Cambridge, Cardiff, Chester, Leeds, Liverpool, London, Manchester, Nottingham, Newcastle, Reading.

The LAB was replaced by the Legal Services Commission (LSC) in April 2000. In recognition of the LAB's success, the LSC was the LAB with increased responsibilities and powers.

The highly knowledgeable and widely respected Steve Orchard led the Legal Aid Board as Chief Executive for the whole period of its existence, and continued as Chief Executive of the Legal Services Commission.

== Civil Legal Aid ==
The LAB administered civil legal aid. Civil legal aid covered all civil actions (except defamation). Applicants received 1 or 2 hours of initial advice from solicitors under the 'Advice and Assistance' scheme (green form).

After this advice, prospective litigants could apply for legal aid for representation in civil proceedings under the Civil Legal Aid scheme. Applications were submitted by the client's solicitor to their local area office for a decision on the merits of the case and the financial eligibility of the client.

From 1989, the assessment of financial eligibility was carried out by the Benefits Agency in Preston. In 1997, the LAB took means assessment work into the area offices, with the Benefits Agency confirming benefits status. Those on benefits were 'passported' as eligible. Clients could be required to make an initial capital contribution and/or monthly contributions towards the costs of their case.

If legal aid was granted, the area office would issue a legal aid certificate, stating the scope of funding and any conditions on work to be done or costs to be incurred, and reporting to be made by the conducting solicitor. The scope could be limited to specific legal steps in proceedings. Solicitors could apply to extend the certificate to cover additional work or costs.

At the end of the case or legal aid, bills were submitted to LAB or the court for assessment, then to the LAB for payment.

== Criminal Legal Aid ==
The scheme was administered by the court service as an integral part of criminal case management. The court issued legal aid to defendants based on scope and financial eligibility.

The LAB involvement was limited to approving extended criminal advice under the 'Advice and Assistance' scheme (green form). The scheme also funded Advice by way of Representation (ABWOR) for early or minor hearings.

The LAB assessed and paid bills for the 'Advice and Assistance' scheme and the Magistrates Courts scheme.

The LAB also administered the Duty Solicitor scheme for providing legal advice and representation at the criminal courts and police stations (under PACE). These were run by local solicitor administrators. The LAB paid the bills for these schemes.

== Franchising ==
The LAB decided that it wished to provide legal aid through a quality assured network of solicitors, knowledgeable of legal aid. This strategy was called Franchising.

Solicitors' firms would be assessed on their client and practice management against the Legal Aid Franchising and Quality Assurance Standard (LAFQAS). This included core requirements for client instruction letters, client updates and file reviews. This quality assurance scheme was the basis for the LAB Specialist Quality Mark (SQM) and The Law Society's LEXCEL quality standard.

Solicitors' files would also be assessed against good practice set out in the Transaction Criteria. These had been developed from analysis by Professor Avrom Sherr at Institute of Advanced Legal Studies, LSE, ably assisted by researcher (now) Professor Richard Moorhouse.

In 1993, a franchising pilot was started to create a practical scheme. Brian Harvey, Director of Resources and Supplier Development developed the scheme.

The LAB formed Franchising teams in each area office. Led by a Franchising Manager, Liaison Managers led audits of solicitors offices with Case Auditors reviewing files.

In 1994, Franchising went live as a voluntary membership scheme. Solicitors applied for franchises in specific categories of law: family, personal injury, housing, criminal, employment, consumer, immigration and social welfare law (covering debt and welfare benefits). Over 1,000 firms applied and joined the first tranche. In return for their commitment, franchisees were given a marginal increase in their fees in 1996 (not non-franchised firms).

In 1996, Franchising was extended to include not-for-profit organisations, such as Citizens Advice Bureaux and Housing Advice Centres. These organisations were skilled in the delivery of debt, benefits and housing advice.

From 1998, plans were developed and consulted on for the Franchise scheme to become an exclusive contracting scheme. Only those firms with contracts would undertake legal aid work. This was implemented in January 2000, when 5,000 contracts were agreed.

== Computerisation of civil case management (CIS) ==
The LAB inherited a financial payment system based on a robust main-frame computer, run by its Finance Department. Area offices sent assessed bills to the Finance department for payment.

Area offices processed solicitors' applications for legal aid on paper, with paper files. Civil legal aid certificates were typed on multi-copy paper. Case records were kept in paper files.

In 1991/92, LAB introduced area case management systems, RACAS, to record applications and decisions on applications, and to bulk-print certificates. This system was extended to cover amendments to legal aid certificates. With most cases only lasting 2–3 years, the computer records built into comprehensive ones relatively quickly. For longer cases, for example personal injury, the records would be updated on next transaction.

The financial information remained on the main-frame. The financial controller, Greg Whelan, arranged for an image of the main-frame data to be available to area office staff (OLIFS).

With the transfer of means assessment from the Benefits Agency to the LAB, processing of civil legal aid applications was speeded up materially. The immediate availability of RACAS and OLIFS online summaries of the state of case funding, allowed area teams to develop much improved telephone services. Caseworkers could provide information on the scope of funding, client contributions, and payments made to solicitors. Further, caseworkers could approve and issue limited or urgent extensions to the scope of funding over the phone.

The area RACAS case records remained separate from central Finance main-frame case records. It was decided to combine the two systems into a single Case Information System (CIS), and convert existing records to the new system. Nick Scholte was appointed as Business Systems Director to develop and implement the new system.

In 1997, the Nottingham Area Office piloted the new system. Additional staff assisted during the implementation phase. Following lessons and system updates, CIS was implemented in the other area offices on a phased basis, supported by a mobile team led by Andy Grant. CIS remained the main civil case management system until its replacement by CCMS over the period 2012–2016.

== Organisation ==
The administrative Headquarters was at 85 Grays Inn Road, London. The Finance Department was in Roger Street, London.

The scheme was administered from 13 area offices. The teams in these offices managed civil case work, civil finance, criminal bills, and franchising teams. The offices were in: Birmingham, Brighton, Bristol, Cambridge, Cardiff, Chester, Leeds, Liverpool, London, Manchester, Nottingham, Newcastle, Reading.

Each area was led by an Area Manager, managed through Regional Managers to the Chief Executive. In 1996, Ken Winberg was appointed Operations Director, with all Area Managers reporting to him. He focused on improving the speed of service, with area offices supporting each other in term of capacity and training of new staff. He also prioritised accuracy and consistency of decision making across the area offices, using consistency exercises and cross-office training.

By the end of the LAB, area offices consisted of an increased number of areas of work and related teams (funded by savings from process streamlining of processes and introduction of computerised case management):

- Civil legal decision making.
- Civil means assessment.
- Civil Finance, paying bills and payments on account.
- Franchising.
- Criminal bills.

== Chief executive ==
- Steve Orchard CBE, 1988–2000 (continued as Chief Executive of the successor organisation, the Legal Services Commission).

== Chairs ==
- John Pitts, 1988–1995
- Sir Tim Chessells, 1995–2000
- Sir Henry Hodge (deputy chair), 1996–1999

== Notable staff ==
- Brian Harvey OBE. Director Resources and Supplier Development.
- Paul Philip. Later Chief Executive of the General Medical Council. Chief Executive of Solicitors Regulatory Authority.
- Dame Glenys Stacey, DBE. Later founding Chief Executive of Criminal Cases Review Commission. Chief Executive of Ofqual.
- Nick Scholte. Later Chief Executive NHS Business Service Authority.
- Ken Winberg. Later Practice Director, Edwards Duthie.
