= Legal Aid Act 1988 =

Act of the Parliament of the United Kingdom

Legal Aid Act 1988 (Note: Section 47(1).)
- Act of Parliament
- Parliament of the United Kingdom
- Long title: An Act to make new provision for the administration of, and to revise the law relating to, legal aid, advice and assistance.
- Citation: 1988 c. 34
- Territorial extent: England and Wales (Note: Section 47(6). Section 44 and schedule 4, which amended the Legal Aid (Scotland) Act 1986, extended to Scotland only.)

Dates
- Royal assent: 29 July 1988
- Commencement: 29 July 1988 (various) (Note: Section 47(4).); 20 August 1988 (various) (Note: Section 47(2). The Legal Aid Act 1988 (Commencement No. 1) Order 1988 (SI 1988/1361).); 1 April 1989 (rest of act) (Note: Section 47(2). The Legal Aid Act 1988 (Commencement No. 3) Order 1989 (SI 1989/288).)
Other legislation
Amends	Administration of Justice Act 1985; See § Repealed enactments
Repeals/revokes	See § Repealed enactments
Amended by	Law Reform (Miscellaneous Provisions) (Scotland) Act 1990; Solicitors' Incorporated Practices Order 1991; Social Security (Consequential Provisions) Act 1992; Trade Union Reform and Employment Rights Act 1993; Employment Tribunals Act 1996; Employment Rights Act 1996; Crime and Disorder Act 1998; Access to Justice Act 1999; Communications Act 2003; Constitutional Reform Act 2005; Equality Act 2006; Legal Aid, Sentencing and Punishment of Offenders Act 2012
Relates to	Legal Aid (Scotland) Act 1986

Status: Partially repealed

Text of statute as originally enacted

Revised text of statute as amended

Text of the Legal Aid Act 1988 as in force today (including any amendments) within the United Kingdom, from legislation.gov.uk.

The Legal Aid Act 1988 (c. 34) is an act of the Parliament of the United Kingdom that made new provision for the administration of, and revised the law relating to, legal aid, advice and assistance in England and Wales. The act established the Legal Aid Board to oversee the administration of legal aid in place of the Law Society, and restructured the provision of legal aid under a framework covering advice and assistance, civil legal aid, and criminal legal aid.

== Provisions ==
=== Repealed enactments ===
Section 45(2) of the act repealed 29 enactments, listed in schedule 6 to the act.

Enactments repealed by section 45(2)
Citation	Short title	Extent of repeal
1967 c. 80	Criminal Justice Act 1967	Section 90.
1974 c. 4	Legal Aid Act 1974	The whole act.
1974 c. 47	Solicitors Act 1974	Section 75(d).
1974 c. 47	Solicitors Act 1974	In schedule 3, paragraph 10.
1975 c. 72	Children Act 1975	Section 65.
1975 c. 72	Children Act 1975	In schedule 3, paragraph 82.
1976 c. 36	Adoption Act 1976	In schedule 3, paragraph 18.
1976 c. 63	Bail Act 1976	Section 11.
1976 c. 71	Supplementary Benefits Act 1976	In schedule 7, paragraphs 33 and 35.
1977 c. 38	Administration of Justice Act 1977	In schedule 1, part I.
1977 c. 45	Criminal Law Act 1977	In schedule 12, the entry relating to the Legal Aid Act 1974.
1978 c. 22	Domestic Proceedings and Magistrates' Courts Act 1978	In schedule 2, paragraphs 45 and 52.
1979 c. 26	Legal Aid Act 1979	The whole act.
1979 c. 55	Justices of the Peace Act 1979	In schedule 2, paragraph 27.
1980 c. 5	Child Care Act 1980	In schedule 5, paragraph 36.
1980 c. 30	Social Security Act 1980	In schedule 4, paragraph 9.
1980 c. 43	Magistrates' Courts Act 1980	In schedule 7, paragraphs 126 to 129.
1981 c. 49	Contempt of Court Act 1981	Section 13.
1981 c. 49	Contempt of Court Act 1981	In schedule 2, part I.
1982 c. 27	Civil Jurisdiction and Judgments Act 1982	Section 40(1).
1982 c. 44	Legal Aid Act 1982	The whole act.
1982 c. 48	Criminal Justice Act 1982	Section 25(2).
1982 c. 48	Criminal Justice Act 1982	Section 29(3).
1982 c. 48	Criminal Justice Act 1982	Section 60(4).
1983 c. 41	Health and Social Services and Social Security Adjudications Act 1983	In schedule 1, paragraph 3.
1984 c. 42	Matrimonial and Family Proceedings Act 1984	In schedule 1, paragraph 18.
1984 c. 60	Police and Criminal Evidence Act 1984	Section 59.
1985 c. 23	Prosecution of Offences Act 1985	Section 16(8).
1985 c. 23	Prosecution of Offences Act 1985	In section 19(2)(b), the words "(including any legal aid order)".
1985 c. 23	Prosecution of Offences Act 1985	In section 21(1), the definition of "legal aid order".
1985 c. 61	Administration of Justice Act 1985	Sections 45 and 46.
1985 c. 61	Administration of Justice Act 1985	In schedule 7, paragraphs 1 to 3.
1986 c. 28	Children and Young Persons (Amendment) Act 1986	Section 3(3).
1986 c. 47	Legal Aid (Scotland) Act 1986	In section 4(2)(c), the words "for the purposes of this Act".
1986 c. 47	Legal Aid (Scotland) Act 1986	In section 16, subsection (1) and, in subsection (2), the words "in this section and".
1986 c. 47	Legal Aid (Scotland) Act 1986	In section 17, subsections (3) to (8).
1986 c. 47	Legal Aid (Scotland) Act 1986	Section 18(1).
1986 c. 47	Legal Aid (Scotland) Act 1986	In section 32(a), the words ", out of the Fund".
1986 c. 47	Legal Aid (Scotland) Act 1986	In schedule 1, paragraph 2(4).
1986 c. 50	Social Security Act 1986	In schedule 10, paragraphs 46, 47 and 56.
1986 c. 55	Family Law Act 1986	Section 64.
1987 c. 38	Criminal Justice Act 1987	In schedule 2, paragraphs 7 and 8.

== Subsequent developments ==
The whole act, except section 33, schedule 4 and part of schedule 5, was repealed by section 106 of, and schedule 15 to, the Access to Justice Act 1999, which came into force on 1 April 2000.
