= Pauper's oath =

Sworn statement to being completely destitute

A pauper's oath is a sworn statement or oath by a person of being completely destitute or a pauper, without much money or property.

A person without the ability to pay court costs, also known as "being indigent", has the option to swear a pauper's oath to file a lawsuit without paying filing fees. Prisoners filing legal actions often use a pauper's oath because persons in prison are often completely without money or any means of acquiring any.

Historically, especially during the Great Depression, the pauper's oath was required as a prerequisite for receiving welfare in the United States.

One pauper's oath used when establishing indigent status under US federal law is as follows:

I do solemnly swear (or affirm) that I have not any property, real or personal, exceeding $20, except such as is by law exempt from being taken on civil process for debt; and that I have no property in any way conveyed or concealed, or in any way disposed of, for my future use or benefit.

"So help me God," at the end, is optional.

== See also ==
- Bankruptcy
- Poverty
- In forma pauperis
