= Scottish Legal Aid Board =

Scottish government non-departmental body

Agency overview
- Formed: April 1987; 39 years ago
- Type: executive non-departmental public body
- Jurisdiction: Scotland
- Headquarters: Thistle House, 91 Haymarket Terrace, Edinburgh, EH12 5HE
- Annual budget: £137,809 (Total cash expenditure 2015–16)
- Minister responsible: Angela Constance MSP, Cabinet Secretary for Justice and Home Affairs
- Agency executives: Ray Macfarlane, Chair; Colin Lancaster, Chief Executive
- Parent department: Scottish Government
- Website: www.slab.org.uk

Map
- Scotland in the UK and Europe

The Scottish Legal Aid Board (SLAB) is an executive non-departmental public body of the Scottish Government, responsible for managing legal aid. It was established in April 1987, under the Legal Aid (Scotland) Act 1986, taking over functions previously exercised by the Law Society.

In 2006 it had an annual budget of approximately £164 million.

== History ==
Providing free legal assistance in Scotland is based on the Poor's Roll of 1424:

"and gif there bee onie pure creature, for faulte of cunning, or expenses, that cannot, nor may not follow his cause, the King for the love of GOD, sall ordain the judge to purwey and get a leill and a wise Advocate, to follow sik pure creatures causes"

This was reinforced by a 1587 act of the Parliament of Scotland:

"quhatsumever lieges of this Realme accused of treason, or for quatsumever crime... full libertie to provide himselfe of Advocates and Praeloquutoures, in competent numbers to defend his life, honour and land, against quhatsumever accusation".

== See also ==
- Scottish public bodies
- Public Defender Solicitor Office, funded by SLAB
