= Access to Justice Act 1999 =

Act of the Parliament of the United Kingdom

Access to Justice Act 1999 (Note: Section 110.)
- Act of Parliament
- Parliament of the United Kingdom
- Long title: An Act to establish the Legal Services Commission, the Community Legal Service and the Criminal Defence Service; to amend the law of legal aid in Scotland; to make further provision about legal services; to make provision about appeals, courts, judges and court proceedings; to amend the law about magistrates and magistrates’ courts; and to make provision about immunity from action and costs and indemnities for certain officials exercising judicial functions.
- Citation: 1999 c. 22
- Territorial extent: England and Wales (Note: Section 108.)

Dates
- Royal assent: 27 July 1999
- Commencement: (Note: Section 108.)
Other legislation
Amends	Metropolitan Police Act 1839; Promissory Oaths Act 1868; Municipal Corporations Act 1882; Explosive Substances Act 1883; Local Government Act 1888; Local Government Act 1948; Manœuvres Act 1958; Administration of Justice Act 1964; Public Works Loans Act 1965; Criminal Appeal Act 1968; Late Night Refreshment Houses Act 1969; Attachment of Earnings Act 1971; Courts Act 1971; Pensions (Increase) Act 1971; Solicitors Act 1974; House of Commons Disqualification Act 1975; Lotteries and Amusements Act 1976; Magistrates' Courts Act 1980; Senior Courts Act 1981; Civil Jurisdiction and Judgments Act 1982; County Courts Act 1984; Child Abduction Act 1984; Legal Aid (Scotland) Act 1986; Criminal Justice Act 1988; Legal Aid Act 1988; Courts and Legal Services Act 1990; Social Security Administration Act 1992; Social Security (Consequential Provisions) Act 1992; Judicial Pensions and Retirement Act 1993; Trade Union Reform and Employment Rights Act 1993; Criminal Procedure (Scotland) Act 1995; Youth Justice and Criminal Evidence Act 1999
Amended by	European Communities (Lawyer’s Practice) Regulations 2000; Powers of Criminal Courts (Sentencing) Act 2000; International Criminal Court Act 2001; Anti-terrorism, Crime and Security Act 2001; Tax Credits Act 2002; Proceeds of Crime Act 2002; Justice (Northern Ireland) Act 2002; Licensing Act 2003; Courts Act 2003; Extradition Act 2003; Secretary of State for Constitutional Affairs Order 2003; Statute Law (Repeals) Act 2004; Domestic Violence, Crime and Victims Act 2004; Constitutional Reform Act 2005; Mental Capacity Act 2005; Inquiries Act 2005; Equality Act 2006; Violent Crime Reduction Act 2006; Criminal Defence Service (Representation Orders and Consequential Amendments) Regulations 2006; Legal Services Act 2007; Tribunals, Courts and Enforcement Act 2007; Criminal Justice and Immigration Act 2008; Human Fertilisation and Embryology Act 2008; Local Democracy, Economic Development and Construction Act 2009; Treaty of Lisbon (Changes in Terminology) Order 2011; Legal Aid, Sentencing and Punishment of Offenders Act 2012; Statute Law (Repeals) Act 2013; Crime and Courts Act 2013; Children and Families Act 2014; Courts Reform (Scotland) Act 2014 (Consequential Provisions) Order 2015

Status: Amended

Text of statute as originally enacted

Revised text of statute as amended

Text of the Access to Justice Act 1999 as in force today (including any amendments) within the United Kingdom, from legislation.gov.uk.

The Access to Justice Act 1999 (c. 22) is an act of the Parliament of the United Kingdom.

== Provisions ==
It replaced the legal aid system in England and Wales. It created the Legal Services Commission, which replaced the Legal Aid Board. It also created two new schemes: Community Legal Service to fund civil and family cases, and the Criminal Defence Service for criminal cases, with the Legal Services Commission overseeing both schemes. The act put a cap on the amount spent on civil legal aid. The use of conditional fee agreements, commonly known as "no-win no-fee", was extended to most civil court cases. The act retained funding for public law cases.

=== Rights of appeal ===
Section 54 of the act both creates and limits rights of appeal. One effect of this, as set out in the UK Supreme Court Practice Direction 1 is "The most important general restriction on rights of appeal is section 54(4) of the Access to Justice Act 1999. The effect of this provision is that the Supreme Court may not entertain any appeal against an order of the Court of Appeal refusing permission for an appeal to the Court of Appeal from a lower court." This accords with Section 40(6) of the Constitutional Reform Act 2005.

== Commencement ==
The act came into force in April 2000.

== Further developments ==
In 2017, the President of the Supreme Court, Lord Neuberger described the legislation as "hard to defend" and also stated that the legislation was "flag-wavingly named".
