= Bill Callaghan =

British trade unionist (born 1948)

Sir William Henry Callaghan (born 19 May 1948) is a British trade unionist involved in the introduction of the national minimum wage. He went on to chair the Health and Safety Commission and the Legal Services Commission.

== Education ==
Callaghan went to Orange Hill Grammar School and was educated at St John's College, Oxford, where he read philosophy, politics and economics, and the University of Kent at Canterbury, where he gained an MA in economics.

== Career ==
Callaghan's early career was in the Trades Union Congress (TUC). He joined the Economic Department as a junior researcher in 1971, eventually becoming the chief economist and head of the Economic and Social Affairs Department in 1979. He worked on a wide range of topics, from incomes policies in the 1970s to developing the TUC's policy on partnership at work in the 1990s.

=== NGOs and QUANGOs ===
Callaghan served on the Low Pay Commission from 1997 to 2000 and played a key role in the introduction of the National Minimum Wage in April 1999. From 1 October 1999, to 30 September 2007, he was Chair of the Health and Safety Commission. The Ladbroke Grove rail crash occurred on the second day of Sir Bill's term of office. He helped establish the public inquiry into the crash by Lord Cullen and championed subsequent improvements in rail safety.

He was instrumental in driving forward the 'Revitalising Health and Safety' initiative, which included director leadership of health and safety, workforce involvement and performance improvement targets. He strengthened the HSE's partnership with local authorities and reinvigorated their occupational health agenda, integrating this with the Government's plans to improve health, work and well-being. Callaghan defended the role of the HSE in a 2006 article in The Guardian, and spearheaded HSE's sensible risk campaign.

He has been involved in a number of aspects of economic and social research, serving on the ESRC's Research Priorities Advisory Committee. Callaghan was a member of the advisory board on the ESRC's influential Future of Work programme (2001–2004).

He has been Chair of the Policy Advisory Committee Centre for Risk and Regulation at LSE since 2007.

He served as an independent member of the Joint Negotiating Committee for Higher Education Staff review of higher education finance and pay data from October 2007 to December 2008. Following the 2007 release of Foot and Mouth virus from the Pirbright site, he led a review into the regulation of animal pathogens for DEFRA, publishing the results on 13 December 2007.

Callaghan was appointed Chair of the Legal Services Commission from 1 September 2008. As part of this role he chairs the Finance and General Purposes Committee. Callaghan has also served on the boards of the Basic Skills Agency and the DTI's Fair Markets Board (2002–07). He has served as magistrate since 2005. Callaghan is Chair of the British Occupational Health Research Foundation, and has previously served on the board of Business in The Community.

He is the current Chair of NEBOSH (National Examination Board in Occupational Safety and Health).

He is also the current Chair of the Marine Management Organisation.

=== In academia ===
Callaghan was a Visiting Fellow of Nuffield College, Oxford from 1999 to 2007. He is also a Fellow of the Sunningdale Institute, part of the National School of Government.

== Honours ==
In June 2007, Callaghan received a knighthood in the Queen's Birthday Honours in recognition of his outstanding contribution to health and safety management at work.

Callaghan received a Distinguished Service Award from The Royal Society for the Prevention of Accidents (RoSPA), in August 2007. This was in recognition of his outstanding contribution to health and safety management at work in his role as Chair of the Health and Safety Commission (HSC).
