= Family Law Act 1986 =

Act of the Parliament of the United Kingdom

Family Law Act 1986 (Note: Section 69(1).)
- Act of Parliament
- Parliament of the United Kingdom
- Long title: An Act to amend the law relating to the jurisdiction of courts in the United Kingdom to make orders with regard to the custody of children; to make provision as to the recognition and enforcement of such orders throughout the United Kingdom; to make further provision as to the imposition, effect and enforcement of restrictions on the removal of children from the United Kingdom or from any part of the United Kingdom; to amend the law relating to the jurisdiction of courts in Scotland as to tutory and curatory; to amend the law relating to the recognition of divorces, annulments and legal separations; to make further provision with respect to the effect of divorces and annulments on wills; to amend the law relating to the powers of courts to make declarations relating to the status of a person; to abolish the right to petition for jactitation of marriage; to repeal the Greek Marriages Act 1884; to make further provision with respect to family proceedings rules; to amend the Child Abduction Act 1984, the Child Abduction (Northern Ireland) Order 1985 and the Child Abduction and Custody Act 1985; and for connected purposes.
- Citation: 1986 c. 55
- Territorial extent: England and Wales (in part); Scotland (in part); Northern Ireland (in part); (Note: Section 69(4)–(7))

Dates
- Royal assent: 7 November 1986
- Commencement: various (Note: Section 69(2)–(3))

Other legislation
- Amends: Indian Independence Act 1947; Jamaica Independence Act 1962; Trinidad and Tobago Independence Act 1962; Malawi Independence Act 1964; Zambia Independence Act 1964; Law Reform (Miscellaneous Provisions) (Scotland) Act 1966; Singapore Act 1966; Marriage (Scotland) Act 1977; Senior Courts Act 1981; Law Reform (Miscellaneous Provisions) (Scotland) Act 1985
- Repeals/revokes: Greek Marriages Act 1884; Indian and Colonial Divorce Jurisdiction Act 1926; Indian and Colonial Divorce Jurisdiction Act 1940; Matrimonial Causes (War Marriages) Act 1944; Colonial and Other Territories (Divorce Jurisdiction) Act 1950; Recognition of Divorces and Legal Separations Act 1971
- Amended by: Family Law Reform Act 1987; Legal Aid Act 1988; Court of Session Act 1988; Age of Legal Capacity (Scotland) Act 1991; Human Fertilisation and Embryology Act 2008

Status: Amended

Text of statute as originally enacted

Revised text of statute as amended

Text of the Family Law Act 1986 as in force today (including any amendments) within the United Kingdom, from legislation.gov.uk.

The Family Law Act 1986 (c. 55) is an act of the Parliament of the United Kingdom. It covers a range of issues, including the custody of children; the recognition of divorces, annulments and separations in other jurisdictions; and declarations of parentage and legitimacy.
