= Legal Aid (Scotland) Act 1986 =

Act of the Parliament of the United Kingdom

Legal Aid (Scotland) Act 1986 (Note: Section 46(1).)
- Act of Parliament
- Parliament of the United Kingdom
- Long title: An Act to establish the Scottish Legal Aid Board and the Scottish Legal Aid Fund; to make new provision in connection with the availability of criminal legal aid in Scotland; to repeal and re-enact with modifications certain enactments relating to legal aid and to advice and assistance in Scotland; and for connected purposes.
- Citation: 1986 c. 47
- Territorial extent: Scotland (Note: Section 46(4). Section 18(3) extends to the whole of the United Kingdom.)

Dates
- Royal assent: 25 July 1986
- Commencement: 1 October 1986 (partially) (Note: Section 46(2). The Legal Aid (Scotland) Act 1986 (Commencement No. 1) Order 1986 (SI 1986/1617).); 1 April 1987 (various) (Note: Section 46(2). The Legal Aid (Scotland) Act 1986 (Commencement No. 2) Order 1987 (SI 1987/289).); 1 July 1992 (section 30) (Note: Section 46(2). The Legal Aid (Scotland) Act 1986 (Commencement No. 3) Order 1992 (SI 1992/1226).)

Other legislation
- Repeals/revokes: See § Repealed enactments
- Amended by: Debtors (Scotland) Act 1987; Legal Aid Act 1988; Advice and Assistance (Scotland) (Prospective Cost) Regulations 1988; Advice and Assistance (Scotland) (Prospective Cost) (No. 3) Regulations 1988; Law Reform (Miscellaneous Provisions) (Scotland) Act 1990; Tribunals and Inquiries Act 1992; Prisoners and Criminal Proceedings (Scotland) Act 1993; Legal Aid (Scotland) Act 1986 Amendment Regulations 1993; Criminal Procedure (Consequential Provisions) (Scotland) Act 1995; Employment Tribunals Act 1996; Employment Rights Act 1996; Crime and Punishment (Scotland) Act 1997; Crime and Punishment (Scotland) Act 1997 (Commencement No. 2 and Transitional and Consequential Provisions) Order 1997; Employment Rights (Dispute Resolution) Act 1998; Access to Justice Act 1999; Scotland Act 1998 (Consequential Modifications) (No. 1) Order 1999; Scotland Act 1998 (Consequential Modifications) (No. 2) Order 1999; Public Finance and Accountability (Scotland) Act 2000; Convention Rights (Compliance) (Scotland) Act 2001; Legal Aid (Scotland) Act 1986 Amendment Regulations 2001; Tax Credits Act 2002; Sexual Offences (Procedure and Evidence) (Scotland) Act 2002; Debt Arrangement and Attachment (Scotland) Act 2002; Redundancy Payments (Continuity of Employment in Local Government, etc.) (Modification) (Amendment) Order 2002; Public Appointments and Public Bodies etc. (Scotland) Act 2003; Criminal Procedure (Amendment) (Scotland) Act 2004; Legal Aid (Scotland) Act 1986 Amendment Regulations 2004; Constitutional Reform Act 2005; Equality Act 2006; Welfare Reform Act 2007; Adult Support and Protection (Scotland) Act 2007; Legal Profession and Legal Aid (Scotland) Act 2007; Criminal Proceedings etc. (Reform) (Scotland) Act 2007; Bankruptcy and Diligence etc. (Scotland) Act 2007; Criminal Procedure (Legal Assistance, Detention and Appeals) (Scotland) Act 2010; Criminal Justice and Licensing (Scotland) Act 2010; Legal Services (Scotland) Act 2010; Advice and Assistance and Civil Legal Aid (Financial Conditions and Contributions) (Scotland) Regulations 2010; Advice and Assistance and Civil Legal Aid (Transfer of Tribunal Functions) (No. 2) (Scotland) Regulations 2010; Children's Hearings (Scotland) Act 2011; Criminal Procedure (Legal Assistance, Detention and Appeals) (Scotland) Act 2010 (Consequential Provisions) Order 2011; Advice and Assistance and Civil Legal Aid (Financial Conditions and Contributions) (Scotland) Regulations 2011; Legal Profession and Legal Aid (Scotland) Act 2007 (Modification and Consequential Provisions) Order 2011; Treaty of Lisbon (Changes in Terminology or Numbering) Order 2012; Legal Services (Scotland) Act 2010 (Ancillary Provision) Regulations 2012; Scottish Civil Justice Council and Criminal Legal Assistance Act 2013; Scotland Act 2012 (Consequential Provisions) Order 2013; Welfare Reform (Consequential Amendments) (Scotland) (No. 2) Regulations 2013; Courts Reform (Scotland) Act 2014; Children and Young People (Scotland) Act 2014; Criminal Justice (Scotland) Act 2016; Bankruptcy (Scotland) Act 2016; Courts Reform (Scotland) Act 2014 (Relevant Officer and Consequential Provisions) Order 2016; Legal Aid (Scotland) Act 1986 Amendment Regulations 2016; Legal Aid (Scotland) Act 1986 Amendment Regulations 2017; Domestic Abuse (Scotland) Act 2018; Criminal Justice (Scotland) Act 2016 (Consequential Provisions) Order 2018; Counter-Terrorism and Border Security Act 2019; Age of Criminal Responsibility (Scotland) Act 2019; Children (Scotland) Act 2020; Civil and Family Justice (EU Exit) (Scotland) (Amendment etc.) Regulations 2020; Children’s Legal Assistance (Miscellaneous Amendments and Consequential Provisions) (Scotland) Regulations 2021; Coronavirus (Recovery and Reform) (Scotland) Act 2022; Legal Aid (Miscellaneous Amendment) (Scotland) Regulations 2024
- Relates to: Legal Aid Act 1988

Status: Amended

Text of statute as originally enacted

Revised text of statute as amended

Text of the Legal Aid (Scotland) Act 1986 as in force today (including any amendments) within the United Kingdom, from legislation.gov.uk.

The Legal Aid (Scotland) Act 1986 (c. 47) is an act of the Parliament of the United Kingdom that established the Scottish Legal Aid Board and the Scottish Legal Aid Fund, made new provision for criminal legal aid in Scotland, and repealed and re-enacted with modifications enactments relating to legal aid and advice and assistance in Scotland.

== Provisions ==
=== Repealed enactments ===
Section 45(3) of the act repealed 15 enactments, listed in schedule 5 to the act.

Enactments repealed by section 45(3)
Citation	Short title	Extent of repeal
1967 c. 43	Legal Aid (Scotland) Act 1967	The whole act.
1968 c. 49	Social Work (Scotland) Act 1968	Section 53. Schedule 4.
1972 c. 11	Superannuation Act 1972	Section 18(2).
1972 c. 18	Maintenance Orders (Reciprocal Enforcement) Act 1972	Section 32(9)(e).
1972 c. 50	Legal Advice and Assistance Act 1972	The whole act.
1973 c. 41	Fair Trading Act 1973	In section 43(1), paragraph (b). Section 43(2).
1975 c. 20	District Courts (Scotland) Act 1975	Section 21.
1977 c. 38	Administration of Justice Act 1977	Section 1(2). In Schedule 1, Part II.
1979 c. 26	Legal Aid Act 1979	Part II. Section 12(2). In section 14(2), the words "and may be cited together with the Act of 1967 and the Act of 1972 as the Legal Aid and Advice (Scotland) Acts 1967 to 1979.". Section 14(3)(b). In section 14(4), the words ", or as the case may be the Secretary of State". Section 14(5)(b). In Schedule 1, paragraphs 1 to 8.
1980 c. 30	Social Security Act 1980	In Schedule 4, paragraph 4.
1980 c. 55	Law Reform (Miscellaneous Provisions) (Scotland) Act 1980	Section 26.
1980 c. 62	Criminal Justice (Scotland) Act 1980	Section 10(4).
1981 c. 49	Contempt of Court Act 1981	Section 13(4). In Schedule 2, Part II.
1982 c. 27	Civil Jurisdiction and Judgments Act 1982	Section 40(2).
1983 c. 12	Divorce Jurisdiction, Court Fees and Legal Aid (Scotland) Act 1983	Section 3. In the Schedule, paragraph 11 and paragraphs 14 to 17.

== Subsequent developments ==
The Law Reform (Miscellaneous Provisions) (Scotland) Act 1990 made significant amendments to the act, including to the provisions governing the availability of civil legal aid. The Legal Profession and Legal Aid (Scotland) Act 2007 further amended the act, notably by inserting new provisions relating to the regulation of the Scottish Legal Aid Board's functions.
