= Legal Aid Agency =

UK government agency

- Formation: 1 April 2013
- Legal status: Executive Agency
- Headquarters: London
- Region served: England and Wales
- Chief Executive: Jane Harbottle
- Website: gov.uk/laa

The Legal Aid Agency is an executive agency of the Ministry of Justice (MoJ) in the United Kingdom. It provides both civil and criminal legal aid and advice in England and Wales. The agency was formed on 1 April 2013 as a replacement for the Legal Services Commission, which unlike the Legal Aid Agency, was a non-departmental public body of the MoJ. This change was enacted by the Legal Aid, Sentencing and Punishment of Offenders Act 2012 to allow for greater ministerial control over the UK government's legal aid budget.

== Chief executive ==
Until recently, the agency's Chief Executive, the Director of Legal Casework, was Shaun McNally (since April 2016). However, in March 2021 this role has now been taken over by Jane Harbottle, who has herself confirmed "it is an honour."

The Chief Executive's role primarily involved achieving the departments policies, ensuring a diverse and competent workforce, as well as making sure the Legal Aid Agency meets statutory obligations. It is also his or her decision about legal aid funding in individual cases.

== Achievements ==
In 2019, the Legal Aid Agency processed 91% of civil applications for legal aid within 20 days, and 100% of crime applications within 2 days. In total, they processed 400,000 applications for legal aid.

== Criticism ==
The Legal Aid Agency has been criticised by the Law Society because many areas of the country have little or no legal aid providers. Additionally, there have been disapprovals of the Legal Aid Agency's handling of exceptional case funding (ECF). ECF is legal funding for a case which does not fall within the scope of LASPO. The Legal Aid Agency had planned for 5,000 to 7,000 applications for ECF in the first year post LASPO, however only achieved 1,520.

Further criticism stems from the Legal Aid Agency's payment and treatment of legal aid providers. Funding provided by the Legal Aid Agency can often take years to come through to barristers. This was identified by the Law Society of England and Wales during the pandemic, who pushed for further guidance from the Legal Aid Agency regarding cash flow problems. The Law Society also expressed their view in a different report that fees provided by the Legal Aid Agency should be paid more fairly, and cover out-of-work hours performed by legal aid providers.

In 2017, the Bach Commission called for the replacement of the Legal Aid Agency with an independent body that does not have any government involvement.

In a 2018 High court Judgement, the Legal Aid Agency (LAA) lost another Judicial Review. The case was to decide how much the LAA pays out in complex fraud cases.

In 2021, leading solicitors launched legal action against the Legal Aid Agency (LAA). The Judicial Review was called because the LAA did not consult solicitors on changes to bringing cost assessment in house. This would mean there would be no independent review of how much the LAA would payout. So essentially the LAA would not be able to dispute payment with itself.
