= Greek Marriages Act 1884 =

Act of the Parliament of the United Kingdom

Greek Marriages Act 1884 (Note: Section 4.)
- Act of Parliament
- Parliament of the United Kingdom
- Long title: An Act to remove Doubts as to the Validity of certain Marriages of Members of the Greek Church in England.
- Citation: 47 & 48 Vict. c. 20
- Introduced by: John Lubbock (Commons)
- Territorial extent: United Kingdom

Dates
- Royal assent: 3 July 1884
- Commencement: 3 July 1884 (Note: The Acts of Parliament (Commencement) Act 1793.)
- Repealed: 4 April 1988 (Note: The Family Law Act 1986 (Commencement No.1) Order 1988 (SI 1988/375).)
Other legislation
Repealed by	Family Law Act 1986

Status: Repealed

Text of statute as originally enacted

The Greek Marriages Act 1884 (47 & 48 Vict. c. 20) was an act of the Parliament of the United Kingdom which allowed courts to declare the validity of Greek Orthodox marriages made between 1836 and 1857. The marriages were celebrated either in their homes or at the Greek Church in London, which by this time had become St Sophia's Cathedral.

The Marriage Act 1836 (6 & 7 Will. 4. c. 85) made marriage the business of multiple religious organisations, and the Matrimonial Causes Act 1857 (20 & 21 Vict. c. 85) made it the business of the state. But there was concern among the Greek community that Greek Orthodoxy had not been one of the religious organisations. If this were so, their marriages would be invalid.

The act laid out a procedure for a court to declare such a marriage valid, and the requirements for doing so.

The first case brought under the act was Zarafi v Attorney General, in August 1885.

== Subsequent developments ==
The whole act was repealed by section 62(1) of the Family Law Act 1986, which came into force on 4 April 1988.
