= Malcolm Richardson =

Scientist & professor

- Education: University of Leeds
- Scientific career
- Workplaces: University of Helsinki; University of Manchester
- Thesis: An Immunological Study of the Blastospore and Mycelium of Candida albicans (1975)
- Website: Prof Malcolm Richardson

Malcolm D. Richardson is director of the Mycology Reference Centre, Manchester University NHS Foundation Trust at Wythenshawe Hospital and an honorary professor of medical mycology at the University of Manchester.

He was formerly an associate professor in medical mycology at the University of Helsinki. He was editor-in-chief of the journal Critical Reviews in Microbiology from 2008 to 2014. He was President of the International Society of Human and Animal Mycology (ISHAM) from 2015 to 2018, and has been president of the Institute of Specialist Surveyors and Engineers since 2013. He has an h-index of 57.
