= Legal Services Commission =

Former England & Wales Government NDPB (2000-2013)

The Legal Services Commission (LSC) was an executive non-departmental public body of the Ministry of Justice which was responsible for the operational administration of legal aid in England and Wales between 2000 and 2013.

The LSC was in effect the Legal Aid Board (LAB) with increased powers to develop the future legal aid scheme. This reflected the success of the LAB under its Chief Executive Steve Orchard and his team over the previous 11 years.

Over the lifetime of the LSC, the provision of legal services was extended. Regional planning and contracting were introduced, particularly increasing social welfare law provision. Telephone advice CLS Direct was introduced (akin to the NHS Direct).

Further, the organisation and management of the civil and criminal schemes changed materially. Criminal legal aid administration transferred from HM Court Service to the LSC. Controls on civil legal aid merits and means testing were increased. Processing centres were introduced.

== Overview ==
The LSC was responsible for a budget of around £2 billion annually, and helping over 2 million people with their legal problems across England and Wales each year. It was established under the Access to Justice Act 1999 (AJA) and in 2000 replaced the Legal Aid Board (founded in 1988 by the Legal Aid Act 1988, its responsibility was previously held by the Law Society of England and Wales through the Legal Aid and Advice Act 1949). Sponsored by the Ministry of Justice, the LSC helped to protect the fundamental rights of the individual and addressed problems that contribute to social exclusion.

The LSC was overseen by an independent board of commissioners, appointed by the Ministry. The commissioners were directly involved in developing regional plans for meeting legal need.

The Access to Justice Act significantly restricted the availability of civil legal aid. The following were excluded (listed in Schedule 2): Personal injury (excluding clinical negligence), conveyancing, boundary disputes, making of wills, matters of trust law, defamation and malicious falsehood, matter of company or partnership law or matters arising out of business.

The Access to Justice Act made material changes to the criteria for civil legal aid. A new Funding Code, developed by Colin Stutt, refined the old merits test. The criteria for granting legal aid were made clearer. This clarified the likely circumstances for applicant, and assisted caseworkers in consistent decision making.

With a change in Lord Chancellor, Lord Falconer set out his vision for legal aid in his report "A fairer deal for legal aid" in July 2005.

== Services ==
The LSC was responsible for the development and administration of two service programmes:

- The Civil Legal Service (CLS), which provides services under the Civil Legal Advice (CLA) banner
- The Criminal Defence Service (CDS)

The CLA aimed to improve access to quality information and help for civil legal problems, in fields such as family, debt and housing law. From 2004, CLA provides direct legal advice services to the public via its Community Legal Advice website and CLA Direct telephone helpline, and also provides advice centre offices for low-income individuals and families, who are referred to participating solicitors and advice agencies that are certified through the CLA's Quality Mark scheme.

The CDS provides free legal advice and representation for people facing criminal charges who are unable to pay for legal help. This is supplied through criminal solicitors’ offices and the Public Defender Service.

== Civil Legal Service - Regional planning and partnership, CLACs & CLANs ==
The LSC took on responsibility for planning and providing legal services. Work had begun under the LAB. Regional planning and partnership teams were set up in regional offices. Regional committees were formed, chaired by Commissioners. Demographic data was analysed. Regional plans were developed.

The LSC met with local authority funders to plan social welfare funding. Some local authorities set up jointly funded services with common providers. As a result, CLS funding to social welfare law was increased. Some CABx and housing advice centres received CLS funding.

Crispin Passmore was appointed Director of the CLS in 2004. DCA's Paper "A fairer deal for legal aid" (2005) acknowledged that 'problem clusters', as identified in LSC's "Causes of Action" (2004) research report, needed to be addressed. A plan was described in the LSC's paper "Making Legal Rights a Reality" (2006). Passmore set about creating more effective delivery of social welfare services through Community Legal Advice Centres (CLACs) and Community Legal Advice Networks (CLANs). CLACs were more suited to urban centres, CLANs in more distributed populations. They would be jointly funded by LSC and local authorities.

Starting in 2007, CLACs were set up in Gateshead, Leicester, Derby, Portsmouth and Hull. In 2010, a CLAN was formed in the East Riding of Yorkshire, followed by one in Barking & Dagenham.

The work on CLS planning was reviewed in the "Needs assessment and the Community Legal Service in England and Wales" report (Dec 2010) by Pascoe Pleasance, UCL and Alexy Buck, Marisol Smith, Nigel Balmer & Ashish Patel of the Legal Services Research Centre.

== Criminal Defence Service ==
The service was made up of solicitors, solicitor advocates, barrister and police station representatives. They provide representation in criminal courts and advice at police stations (as required under the Police and Criminal Evidence Act 1984, PACE).

From 2001, the service was exclusively provided through providers contracted with the LSC under the General Criminal Contract. These providers were quality assured and audited.

The Access to Justice Act (AJA) allowed for the LSC to create a Public Defender Service (PDS), a directly employed defence service. The first offices were set up in 2001 and 2002: Cheltenham, Birmingham, Liverpool, Merthyr Tydfill, Swansea and Pontypridd. In 2003 offices were opened in Darlington and Chester. Solicitors, solicitor advocates and police station representatives were employed. Clients chose private or publicly employed representation. The effectiveness was assessed in the report "Evaluation of the Public Defender Service" (2007). The PDS continues to operate 4 offices in 2026: Cheltenham, Darlington, Merthyr Tydfill and Pontypridd, Swansea.

In October 2005, the LSC began a pilot of CDS Direct. It provided telephone advice to suspects at police stations for those who had requested a duty solicitor (as opposed to 'own solicitor'). Where a duty solicitor was required, the call would be transferred to the Duty Solicitor Call Centre to arrange. Three solicitors firms were contracted to provide telephone advice, usually using para-legals.

Following the Carter Review (2006), the LSC decided to proceed with the centralising the control of duty solicitor advice and representation.

In January 2008, the LSC created the Defence Solicitor Call Centre (DSCC). The DSCC call centre exclusively handled requests for legal representation at police stations to duty solicitors or own solicitors. It decided whether a solicitor should attend, or advice should be limited to telephone advice. John Sirodcar, Head of Direct Services, developed the scheme and led the tender process. The first DSCC contract was placed with First Assist.

In February 2008, the LSC began a pilot of the CDS Direct telephone service (akin to NHS Direct). Using paralegals, the call centre provided direct legal advice on suitable criminal cases.

As of 2026, the DSCC continues to control duty solicitor call outs, delivered by a contracted specialist call centre company. Telephone advice is provided by Criminal Defence Direct, delivered by a contract solicitor firm.

== CDS transfer of powers ==
In 2006, under the Criminal Defence Service Act, the power to issue criminal legal aid was transferred from HM Court Service to the LSC. This was enabling legislation. The LSC delegated back to HMCS the continued granting of funding in the Magistrates Courts and Crown Courts.

Daniel Flury joined the LSC from the HM Court Service in 2007 to develop the transfer of the processing to the LSC. Fully online applications using CRM14 eForms until 2014.

== Very High Cost Civil Cases ==
The Funding Code Procedures gave powers to increased controls for civil cases costing more than £25,000 and multi-party actions. David Keegan developed the arrangements for the new scheme. Solicitors were required to provide a case plan, which fixed the costs stage by stage. 'Risk rate' funding was introduced to civil damages based cases, akin to success fees in conditional fees introduced under the Access to Justice Act for private client work. Typical case plans were produced. Expert fees were standardised.

A new Special Cases Unit was set up in 2000 with Peter Monaghan as the Operations Manager. Solicitors from around the LSC were combined into the Special Cases Unit. Additional junior and senior solicitors and barristers were recruited. Civil cases were transferred to SCU when they were identified as potentially VHCC cases, or when the VHCC cost limit was reached. Solicitors submitted case plans were negotiated and agreed with the SCU caseworkers and case managers.

Multi-party actions (MPAs) were centralised into the Special Cases Unit, managed by nominated senior case managers. Existing MPAs were reviewed and brought under stricter scope and cost controls.

New MPAs were subject to new Funding Code controls. A new 'significant wider public interest' criterion was introduced, with the level being evaluated by the Public Interest Advisory Panel (PIAP). A new 'affordability' criterion was introduced and an annual budget for MPAs set. The funding of new MPA applications had to affordable within the budget. So individual MPA stage-by-stage budgets were set, giving financial certainty to solicitors and LSC.

== Very High Cost Criminal Cases ==
A new scheme was introduced to control the costs of criminal cases with trials of 25 days or more. Richard Collins developed the arrangements for the new scheme. Solicitors were required to provide a case plan, which fixed the costs stage by stage. Cases were grouped into levels of complexity and specialism, with associated hourly rates of payment.

A Complex Crime Unit (CCU) was set up in 2001 with Nigel Field (transferred from HMCTS) as its Head, in London, Liverpool and Nottingham. A team of caseworkers was recruited. Experienced Crown Court bill assessor was seconded from HMCTS. Case Manager and caseworkers reviewed case plans and negotiated costs stage by stage. New cases were taken on as they arose.

The Carter Review "Legal Aid: A market-based approach to reform." (Report 2006) proposed that VHCCC should be undertaken by an exclusive panel of specialist solicitors and barristers, with best value tendering for implementation in October 2007 (Recommendations 14.7 & 14.8). New reduced hourly rates were set for the tender.

The tender process was complete with contracts including lower hourly rates of pay to be signed in January 2008. 326 solicitor's firms entered into contracts. Of roughly 2,300 barristers offered contracts, only 100 signed them. The barristers boycotted new VHCC cases. This led to a stand-off as new cases were identified and progressed during 2008. An interim VHCCC scheme was introduced in October 2008. The VHCCC scheme was limited to cases with trials of 40 days or more, with the 25-40 day cases transferred to the graduated fee schemes. Contract hourly rates were increased through contract amendments (13/11/2008, 15/12/2008, 05/05/2009). The scheme continued in this form until 2013.

== Move to processing centres ==
The Legal Aid Board had 13 area offices. In 2009, the LSC set out an intention to centralised processing on five sites. This would assist with consistency of decision making, specialist decision making and training of staff.

Civil legal aid work was centralised in Jarrow and Liverpool. Applications were primarily processed by Joanne Bainbridge's team in Jarrow. Payments were primarily processed by Steve Starkey's team in Liverpool.

The centralisation was linked to the transfer of criminal bill payment work from HM Court Service to the LSC. Criminal bill assessment was centralised on the Nottingham Office, with Liverpool as second site. Magistrates Court bills were processed by Cathy Ayton's team in Nottingham. Crown Court bills transferred to LSC in 2011 and were processed by Nick Poulter's team in Nottingham.

The High Cost case teams were centralised in London, processing high cost civil cases, very high cost criminal cases.

== NAO qualification of LSC accounts in 2009 ==
In 2009, the National Audit Office (NAO) qualified the LSC's 2008/09 accounts. The reasons were summarised by the Comptroller and Auditor General (CAG) in 2013 as that material amounts were paid to:

- legal aid providers where the claim is not in compliance with statutory scheme rules; and
- legal aid providers after granting of legal aid to applicants who were not eligible or whose eligibility could not be proven.

In 2009 the NAO estimated that £18.3 million of £1.9 billion of expenditure was overpaid to solicitors and barristers, primarily due to lack of supporting documentation to justify the payment. This error was split: Legal Help including standard monthly payments £12.8 million, Crime lower courts £3.6 million, Crime higher courts £2.0 million.

Significant action was taken by the contracting teams to verify and reconcile standard monthly payments, using a risk-based approach. The bill paying teams were more strict on delivery of supporting documents. Random sampling of processed bills was increased to provide a higher level of quality assurance. Exception reporting identified unusual and irregular payments for review and repayment.

In 2009 the NAO estimated that £6.4 million of the £1.9 billion payments related to legal aid provided to ineligible clients. This error was split: Legal Help £2.3 million, Magistrates Court £2.3 million, Civil Representation £1.6 million, CLS Direct £0.2 million.

Means assessment for legal aid was completely reformed. Mark Cheeseman carried out a review and developed new procedures. Much increased financial documentation was required (3 months bank statements) plus addition follow-up enquiries and document required for any unusual expenditure. A random sample of applicants were subject to detailed follow-up analysis to provide a higher level of quality assurance.

LSC accounts continued to be qualified until 2012/23. In 2012/13 the NAO audit estimated the irregular payments at £14.5 million in a spend £2.1 billion. At this point the Comptroller and Auditor General concluded this error level was not material. The stewardship of the fund, risk management, and internal controls had significantly improved.

== Replacement by Legal Aid Agency ==
The Legal Aid, Sentencing and Punishment of Offenders Act 2012 made provision for the abolition of the LSC. The LSC was replaced by the Legal Aid Agency, an executive agency of the Ministry of Justice, on 1 April 2013. The agency carries out a similar function to the LSC, but no longer has the scheme development responsibility. Its executive agency status differs from the LSC's non-departmental public body status. Independence of decision-making within the Legal Aid Agency is through the post of a Director of Legal Aid Casework, who has independence from the Lord Chancellor in applying directions and guidance to any individual funding decision.

== Chairs ==
- Peter Birch, 2000-2005.
- Lord Michael Bichard, 2005-08.
- Sir Bill Callaghan, 2008-13.

== Chief Executives ==
- Steve Orchard CBE, 2000-03.
- Clare Dodgson, 2003-2005.
- Brian Harvey OBE (acting), 2005-2006.
- Carolyn Regan CBE, 2006-2010.
- Carolyn Downs CB, 2010-2011.
- Matthew Coats CB, 2012-2013.

== Notable staff ==
- Alistair Adan. Future Head of Case Manager for Legal Aid Agency.
- Angus Andrew. Solicitor Commissioner. Chair of the Public Interest Advisory Panel.
- Cathy Ayton. Criminal Bills Manager.
- Jo Bainbridge. Head of Civil Applications processing. Head of Operations for Legal Aid Agency.
- Malcolm Bryant. Legal advisor. Future Head of Exceptional Case Funding and Head of Public Defender Service for Legal Aid Agency.
- Mark Cheeseman OBE. Head of Means Assessment team. Head of Counter-Fraud team. Future Chief Executive of Public Sector Fraud Authority.
- Richard Collins OBE. Policy & Planning Director.
- David Edmonds. Chair of LSC Tender Assessment Panels. Chair of NHS Direct.
- Tony Edwards. Solicitor Commissioner. Professional Head of the Public Defender Service.
- Daniel Flury. Director of Criminal Casework & Criminal Legal Aid Transfer. Future Operations Director for HM Courts & Tribunal Service.
- Jane Harbottle. Senior Manager Direct Service. Head of Civil Case Management. Future Chief Executive of Legal Aid Agency.
- Robert Heard. Operations Manger of Complex Crime Unit. Future Head of Criminal Case Unit of Legal Aid Agency.
- Derek Hill. Director of Criminal Defence Service.
- Mike Jeacock. Director of Service Delivery.
- David Keegan. Director High Cost Cases.
- Shaun McNally CBE. Director of Case Management. Future Chief Executive of Legal Aid Agency.
- Crispin Passmore. Director of Civil Legal Service.
- Nick Poulter. Crown Court Bill Manager. Future Head of Operations (Crime) for Legal Aid Agency.
- John Sirodcar. Head of Director Services. Head of Contract Management.
- Steve Starkey. Head of Civil Bill assessment.
- Ruth Wayte. Legal Director. Future Judge of Residential Property Tribunal.

== Legal case: All About Rights Law Practice ==
In or around 2009 the LSC decided to replace the provision of legal aid through the civil Unified Contract of 2007 by granting contracts to law firms selected through a series of tendering exercises. There were separate exercises in different fields of law, with some 10,000 bids in total across the civil law tender round. The LSC's tendering exercise for the procurement of mental health services in England and Wales took place in 2010. In error, solicitor Mr. Ranjan Nadarajah, in business as "All About Rights Law Practice", submitted a blank document in place of what should have been his completed tender documentation for the provision of publicly funded mental health legal aid work. Mr. Nadarajah argued that his exclusion from the procurement process was "disproportionate and unjustified". In a ruling handed down after the LSC had closed, Mrs Justice Carr found that "AAR was not unlawfully deprived by the LSC of a contract" and that "the LSC's rejection of AAR's bid was not disproportionate, nor did it amount to unequal treatment".

== Criticism ==
In the House of Commons on 20 July 2010 Robert Buckland MP made what the Parliamentary Under-secretary of State for Justice, Jonathan Djanogly, described as "serious accusations of mismanagement".
