= Legal aid =

Provision of free or low-cost legal representation to disadvantaged people

Legal aid is the provision of assistance to people who are unable to afford legal representation and access to the court system. Legal aid is regarded as central in providing access to justice by ensuring equality before the law, the right to counsel and the right to a fair trial. This article describes the development of legal aid and its principles, primarily as known in Europe, the Commonwealth of Nations and in the United States.

Legal aid is essential to guaranteeing equal access to justice for all, as provided for by Article 6.3 of the European Convention on Human Rights regarding criminal law cases and Article 6.1 of the same Convention both for civil and criminal cases. Especially for citizens who do not have sufficient financial means, the provision of legal aid to clients by governments increases the likelihood, within court proceedings, of being assisted by legal professionals for free or at a lower cost, or of receiving financial aid.

A number of delivery models for legal aid have emerged, including duty lawyers, community legal clinics, and the payment of lawyers to deal with cases for individuals who are entitled to legal aid. More informal or general legal advice and assistance may also be provided for free or at low cost through such means as law centres (UK), community legal centres (Australia) or a variety of other organisations which provide various forms of legal aid in and outside of court.

== History ==
Legal aid has a close relationship with the welfare state, and the provision of legal aid by a state is influenced by attitudes toward welfare. Legal aid is a welfare provision by the state for people who would otherwise be unable to afford legal counsel. It also helps to ensure that welfare provisions are enforced by providing people entitled to such benefits, including social housing, with access to legal advice and the courts.

Historically, legal aid has played a significant role in ensuring respect for economic, social and cultural rights, particularly in relation to social security, housing, social care, health, and education services, which may be provided publicly or privately, as well as employment law and anti-discrimination legislation. Jurists such as Mauro Cappelletti have argued that legal aid is essential to access to justice, as it enables individuals to enforce economic, social and cultural rights through legal mechanisms. His views developed during the second half of the 20th century, when democracies with capitalist economies established liberal welfare states that focused on the individual. States increasingly acted as contractors and service providers within a market-based philosophy that emphasised the citizen as a consumer. This shift led to a greater emphasis on individual enforcement as a means of achieving the realisation of rights for all.

Prior to the mid-20th century, literature on legal aid emphasised the collective enforcement of economic, social and cultural rights. As classic welfare states were established during the 1940s and following World War II, a central principle was that citizens shared collective responsibility for economic, social, and cultural rights, and that the state assumed responsibility for those unable to provide for themselves due to illness or unemployment. The enforcement of these rights was primarily collective, achieved through public policies rather than individual legal action. Laws were enacted to support welfare provisions, but these were generally regarded as instruments for planners rather than lawyers. Legal aid schemes were introduced on the assumption that the state had a responsibility to assist those involved in legal disputes; however, these schemes initially focused mainly on family law and divorce.

During the 1950s and 1960s, the role of the welfare state evolved, and social goals were no longer assumed to be universally shared. Individuals were increasingly free to pursue their own objectives. During this period, the welfare state expanded, along with legal aid provisions, as concerns arose regarding the power of welfare providers and professionals. In the 1960s and 1970s, demand grew for individuals to have the right to legally enforce economic, social and cultural rights and the welfare benefits to which they were entitled. Mechanisms emerged that enabled citizens to enforce their economic, social, and cultural rights through legal processes, and welfare lawyers used legal aid to advise individuals on low incomes when dealing with state officials. As a result, legal aid was extended beyond family law to cover a broad range of economic, social, and cultural rights.

In the 1980s, the role of the traditional welfare state was increasingly questioned, and welfare services were more frequently provided by private entities. Legal aid was also increasingly delivered through private providers, though it remained focused primarily on assistance in court proceedings. Citizens came to be viewed more as consumers, expected to choose among available services. Where such choice was not possible, citizens were given the right to express dissatisfaction through administrative complaints processes. This development created tension, as legal aid systems were not designed to provide advice for those seeking redress through administrative complaint mechanisms. Further tensions emerged as states that prioritised individual enforcement of economic, social, and cultural rights, rather than collective enforcement through public policy, reduced funding for legal aid as a welfare provision. Individual enforcement of welfare entitlements requires levels of legal aid funding more commonly associated with systems that emphasise collective enforcement.]], and the provision of legal aid by a state is influenced by attitudes towards welfare. Legal aid is a welfare provision by the state to people who could otherwise not afford counsel from the legal system. Legal aid also helps to ensure that welfare provisions are enforced by providing people entitled to welfare provisions, such as social housing, with access to legal advice and the courts.

Prior to the mid-20th century, literature on legal aid emphasised collective enforcement of economic, social and cultural rights. As classic welfare states were built in the 1940s and following World War II, an underlying principle was that citizens had collective responsibility for economic, social and cultural rights; and the state assumed responsibility for those unable to provide for themselves through illness and unemployment. The enforcement of economic, social and cultural rights was to be collective, through policies rather than individual legal action. Laws were enacted to support welfare provisions, though these were regarded as laws for planners, not lawyers. Legal aid schemes were established, as it was assumed that the state had a responsibility to assist those engaged in legal disputes, but they initially focused primarily on family law and divorce.

In the 1950s and 1960s, the role of the welfare state changed, and social goals were no longer assumed to be common goals. Individuals were free to pursue their own goals. The welfare state in this time expanded, along with legal aid provisions, as concerns emerged over the power of welfare providers and professionals. In the 1960s and 1970s, demand rose for the right of individuals to legally enforce economic, social and cultural rights and the welfare provisions they as individuals were entitled to. Mechanisms emerged through which citizens could legally enforce their economic, social, and cultural rights, and welfare lawyers used legal aid to advise those on low income when dealing with state officials. Legal aid was extended from family law to a wide range of economic, social, and cultural rights.

In the 1980s, the role of the classic welfare state was no longer regarded as necessarily positive, and welfare was increasingly provided by private entities. Legal aid was increasingly provided through private providers, but they remained focused on providing assistance in court cases. Citizens were increasingly regarded as consumers, who should be able to choose among services. Where it was not possible to provide such a choice, citizens were given the right to voice their dissatisfaction through administrative complaints processes. This resulted in tension, as legal aid was not designed to offer advice to those seeking redress through administrative complaints processes. Tensions also began to emerge as states which emphasised individual enforcement of economic, social, and cultural rights, rather than collective enforcement through policies, reduced funding for legal aid as a welfare state provision. Individual enforcement of welfare entitlement requires the kind of legal aid funding states emphasising collective enforcement were more likely to provide.

== Legal aid movements ==
Historically legal aid has its roots in the right to counsel and right to a fair trial movement of the 19th-century continental European countries. "Poor man's laws" waived court fees for the poor and provided for the appointment of duty solicitors for those who could not afford to pay for a solicitor. Initially the expectation was that duty solicitors would act on a pro bono basis. In the early 20th century, many European countries had no formal approach to legal aid, and the poor relied on the charity of lawyers. Most countries went on to establish laws that provided for the payment of a moderate fee to duty solicitors. To curb demand, legal aid was restricted to lawyer costs in judicial proceedings requiring a lawyer. Countries with a civil law legal system and common law legal systems take different approaches to the right to counsel in civil and criminal proceedings. Civil law countries are more likely to emphasise the right to counsel in civil proceedings, and therefore provide legal aid where a lawyer is required. Common law countries emphasise the right to counsel and provide legal aid primarily in relation to criminal proceedings.

In response to rapid industrialisation in the late 19th-century Europe, trade union and workers' parties emerged that challenged the social policies of governments. They gained passage of laws to provide workers with legal rights in the event of illness or accidents, in an attempt to prevent industrial action by industrial workers. Workers unions in turn started to provide workers with legal advice on their new economic, social and cultural rights. Demand for these services was high and in an attempt to provide workers with non-partisan advice, many governments started to provide legal aid by the early 20th century.

== Recent times ==
In the 20th century, legal aid developed together with progressive principles; it has often been supported by those members of the legal profession who felt that it was their responsibility to care for those on low income. Legal aid became driven by what lawyers could offer to meet the "legal needs" of those they have identified as poor, marginalised or discriminated against. According to Francis Regan in 1999, legal aid provision is supply driven, not demand driven, leading to wide gaps between provisions that meet perceived needs and actual demand. Legal service initiatives, such as neighbourhood mediation and legal services, frequently have to close due to lack of demand, while others are overwhelmed with clients.

Though legal aid aims to create more equity in the sphere of legal practices, according to a 1985 article, aid offered is often limited in its quality or its social impact by economic constraints that dictate who can access these services and where the aforementioned services are geographically located.

Pro bono legal aid has been criticized for being politicized, and for being mandatory volunteering in some cases.

== By country ==
=== Asia ===
Most developmental legal aid services are provided by grassroots organizations, human rights-based non-governmental organizations (NGOs), or are stipulated by constitutional laws by some Asian governments.

==== Hong Kong ====
A unitary jurisdiction, Hong Kong provides legal aid solely provided through the Legal Aid Department, which is in turn overseen by the Legal Aid Services Council.

Administratively the Legal Aid Department was under the Administration Wing of the Chief Secretary's Office. In 2007, it was moved to the Home Affairs Bureau, which chiefly oversees cultural matters and local administration. This was heavily criticized by the opposition pro-democracy camp for jeopardising neutrality of the provision of legal aid. They voted en bloc against the whole package of reorganisation of policy bureaus, of which the transfer of the Legal Aid Department was part.

==== India ====
Article 39A of the Constitution of India, provides for equal justice and free legal aid:

The State shall secure that the operation of the legal system promotes justice, on a basis of equal opportunity, and shall, in particular, provide free legal aid, by suitable legislation or schemes or in any other way, to ensure that opportunities for securing justice are not denied to any citizen by reason of economic or other disabilities.

This Article emphasises that free legal service is an inalienable element of 'reasonable, fair and just' procedure, for without it a person suffering from economic or other disabilities would be deprived of the opportunity for securing justice.

In the civil side, Order XXXIII. R.18 of the Code of Civil Procedure 1908 provided that the state and central governments may make supplementary provisions as it thinks fit for providing free legal services to those who have been permitted to sue as an indigent person. The Legal Services Authorities Act, 1987 made drastic changes in the field of legal services. It is an Act to constitute legal services authorities to provide free and competent legal services to the weaker sections of the society to ensure that opportunities for securing justice are not denied to any citizen by reason of economic or other disabilities, and to organize Lok Adalats to secure that the operation of the legal system promotes justice on a basis of equal opportunity.

==== Philippines ====
Developmental legal assistance or developmental legal aid, as it is often called in the Philippines, has come a long way since the Marcos dictatorship. During martial law, the father of human rights Sen. Jose W. Diokno was sent to prison when Ferdinand Marcos arrested all political dissidents. Once Diokno was released 718 days later, the attorney and former senator founded the Free Legal Assistance Group, the oldest and largest human rights firm since 1974. It was through FLAG's innovative use of developmental legal aid, which included pro-bono legal service as well as free allowances to clients who were financially incapacitated, that free legal service became standard practice in the country. Later on, laws were introduced that would require newly licensed barristers to give free legal service to the poor for a stipulated and fixed duration of time. The most famous law on developmental legal aid is called the Community Legal Aid Service (CLAS) Rule. The CLAS Rule applies to lawyers who are in their first year of practice. Many developmental legal services are provided by most law firms and NGOs in the Philippines.

In 2019 FLAG freely represented Time Person of the Year Maria Ressa during her libel case against the 16th president, Rodrigo Duterte, as it was her exposés on Duterte's war on drugs that have sparked worldwide debates on the potential legal repercussions of Duterte's actions.

In 2020, Duterte created a new law called the Anti-Terror Law, which would arrest any dissident due to loose definitions in the law on who might be marked as "terrorists". This has incited protests from the masses as well as from FLAG chairman Atty. Jose Manuel "Chel" Diokno. FLAG, alongside fellow columnists, statesmen, and political detainees responded with issuing the legal challenge G.R. No. 252741 against Duterte's Executive Secretary Salvador Medialdea on the grounds and rationality of the law. Among the provisions that is being questioned is Section 29 on detention without judicial warrant of arrest in which a suspect can be arrested even without a warrant of arrest and detained for up to 24 days, which echoed back to the days of martial law under Marcos that allowed the proliferation of developmental legal aid in the first place.

=== Europe ===
Article 47 of the Charter of Fundamental Rights of the European Union provides that legal aid will be made available to those who lack sufficient resources, in so far as such aid is necessary to ensure effective access to justice.

==== Central and Eastern Europe, and Russia ====
According to PILnet: the Global Network for Public Interest Law,

for over a decade, the countries of Central and Eastern Europe and Russia have been in the process of reforming and restructuring their legal systems. While many critical justice sector reforms have been undertaken throughout the region, the mechanisms to ensure individuals' access to legal information and assistance often remain inadequate and ineffective. Consequently, many people—especially those who are poor or otherwise disadvantaged—are left without any real access to legal counsel in both criminal and non-criminal matters.

In the Czech Republic, qualifying persons (usually those who evidence inadequacy of funds) can apply to the courts or the Czech Bar Association to have an attorney appointed to them.

==== Denmark ====
In Denmark, applicants must satisfy the following criteria to receive legal aid for civil cases: The applicant must not earn more than kr. 289,000 ($50,000) a year and the claims of the party must seem reasonable. In respect to criminal cases, the convicted will only have to cover the costs if he or she has a considerable fixed income – this is to prevent recidivism.

==== Germany ====
In civil cases including employment, administrative, constitutional, and social cases, assistance under the Legal Advice Scheme Act (in the form of advice and, where necessary, representation) is given. In criminal cases, the defendant has a right to counsel, and in certain cases when the penalty is at least one year of confinement, the defendant can be given counsel even against his or her wishes.

==== Italy ====
Known as Patrocinio a spese dello Stato, legal aid is provided by the Italian Law DPR n. 115/2002 – Articles. 74–141. It is intended to implement Article 24 of the Italian Constitution and ensure access to the right of defense (in civil, administrative and criminal cases) to persons not able to independently obtain the services of a lawyer due to the inability to pay for them from their income (less than €10,776.33 per capita).

The Constitution of the Italian Republic, Clause 24 states:

Everyone is allowed to take legal action for the protection of her/his rights and legitimate interests. Defence is an inviolable right at any grade of the proceedings. The means of action and defence before all Courts are guaranteed to the indigent by public institutions. The law determines the conditions and legal means to remedy miscarriages of justice.

Legal aid in Italy is a service to allow everyone to be assisted by a lawyer or by an expert witness free of any legal fees or costs in all criminal, civil, administrative, accounting or fiscal proceeding and "voluntary jurisdiction" and whenever the presence of a lawyer or expert witness is required by law. Legal aid is granted for all grades or stages of the trial, including all further connected incidental and contingent proceedings. It is granted before Tribunals, Courts of Appeal, the Supreme Court, surveillance courts and judges, Regional Administrative Tribunals, Judicial Review Committees, Provincial and Regional Fiscal Commissions and the State Auditors' Court.

==== United Kingdom ====
===== England and Wales =====
====== Introduction ======
Legal aid was originally established by the Legal Aid and Advice Act 1949. In 2009, legal aid in England and Wales cost the taxpayer £2bn a year – a higher per capita spend than anywhere else in the world – and was available to around 29% of adults. However, availability and level of provision of legal aid have greatly decreased since 2012 as a result of austerity measures in the Legal Aid, Sentencing and Punishment of Offenders Act 2012.

Legal aid in England and Wales is administered by the Legal Aid Agency (until 31 March 2013 by the Legal Services Commission), and is available for most criminal cases, and many types of civil cases. Exceptions include libel, most personal injury cases (which are now dealt with under Conditional Fee Agreements, a species of contingent fee), and corporate cases. Family cases are also sometimes covered. Depending on the type of case, legal aid may or may not be means tested and in some cases legal aid can be free to those on benefits, out of work and have no savings or assets.

Criminal legal aid is generally provided through private firms of solicitors and barristers in private practice. A limited number of public defenders are directly employed by the Legal Aid Agency in Public Defender Service offices; they provide advice in police stations and advocacy in magistrates and crown courts. Civil legal aid is provided through solicitors and barristers in private practice but also by lawyers working in Law Centres and not-for-profit advice agencies.

====== LASPO ======
The provision of legal aid is governed by the Access to Justice Act 1999 and supplementary legislation, most recently the Legal Aid, Sentencing and Punishment of Offenders Act 2012 (LASPO), which came into force in 2013. LASPO triggered an immediate 46% plunge in the number of cases in which legal aid was granted, from 925,000 in 2012 to just 497,000 cases in the following year. The Legal Aid, Sentencing and Punishment of Offenders Act 2012 (LASPO) stopped aid for areas of law that include family, welfare, housing, and debt. There are complaints that cuts to legal aid from LASPO have prevented the poorest people getting justice.

People with disabilities who dispute benefit claims are usually denied legal aid, forcing them to deal with complex and distressing cases without help. The numbers disputing when benefits are denied have fallen drastically and it is feared the most vulnerable are losing out.

The government's rationale for introducing LASPO was because people who could clearly afford their own legal fees were abusing the system, and cases which could clearly be settled with alternative dispute resolution were unnecessarily being taken to court. This can be seen in the government's response to legal aid reforms in 2011, where Kenneth Clarke, Lord Chancellor and Secretary of State for Justice, said funding was being provided for "unnecessary litigation", something which he viewed as "unaffordable" and "spiralling legal costs". He also noted that before the introduction of LASPO, England and Wales were spending £39 per head of the population on legal aid compared with only £8 per head in New Zealand. Experts maintain the burden of cost has just been transferred to the courts, NHS and social care, which in the end costs the state more.

====== The effects of LASPO on legal aid in England and Wales ======
Supreme Court justice Lord Wilson of Culworth fears the effectiveness of legal aid is being reduced. Wilson said cuts to legal aid prevent the disadvantaged from exercising their human rights. He also says that even in areas were legal aid is allowed, the payment to lawyers is so low that many of them stop providing legal aid. The Law Society maintains restrictions to legal aid are preventing defendants getting a fair trial.

BBC analysis found up to a million people are in areas without legal aid for housing, and 15 million are in areas with one provider. Liberty maintained ability to get justice had been "significantly undermined". There were roughly 1,000 fewer civil legal aid providers in 2018 since 2011–12, with most of the providers being based in London. Richard Miller of the Law society said it can be very difficult to find legal aid providers willing to take on a case. Lord Dyson said this has led to vulnerable people representing themselves in court, with many defendants paying towards their defence (sometimes nearly as expensive as paying for a private lawyer).

Furthermore, Ben Tovey says he has to turn away people from legal aid every day.

Law centres have also closed due to funding cuts adding to the problems of people needing legal aid. Nimrod Ben-Cnaan of the Law Centres Network, maintained the legal aid market was, "failing" since cuts, "shattered local ecologies of advice," and that it is vital law centres are rebuilt. Malcolm Richardson, retired magistrate said legal advisers must increasingly guide litigant in person through court proceedings. He said, "It puts all the judiciary in a difficult position but also burdens the whole court system."

Tom McNally said, "If we really wanted to make substantial reforms to the criminal justice system, it was almost impossible with the continuation of austerity." Litigants in person do not know what evidence to bring or what questions to ask. During divorce and separation cases far fewer couples take up mediation. Without lawyers no one is around to point out less confrontational ways of settling matters. Philip Alston said that legal aid had become considerably less available in England and Wales from 2012, which had, "overwhelmingly affected the poor and people with disabilities, many of whom cannot otherwise afford to challenge benefit denials or reductions and are thus effectively deprived of their human rights to a remedy".

LASPO has also had an impact on legal aid providers, who say they are "dismay[ed] at...such deep and arbitrary cuts" to legal aid. There have been 37 legal aid providers which have collapsed since April 2020, which is more than 70 offices. This has caused barristers who offer legal aid to feel their role has been "driven to extinction" due to job losses. For example, in Exeter there are now no legal aid providers for immigration or asylum, with the closest provider being 37.6 miles (60.5 km) away (Plymouth) from the city centre. It has been revealed that these providers receive a median net annual income of £27,000, which is less than the starting salary for a graduate manager at Aldi. The Law Society believe that this level of pay should be made fairer. Whilst legal aid lawyers are funded by the legal aid agency, it can sometimes take years for payments to come through to them. This is due to cashflow problems with the legal aid agency, something the Law Society is pushing for guidance and clarification from.

===== Scotland =====
Legal aid is in principle available for all civil actions in the Court of Session and Sheriff Court in Scotland, with the significant exception of actions of defamation. It is also available for some statutory tribunals, such as the Immigration Appeal Adjudicator and the Social Security Commissioners. There is a separate system of criminal legal aid, and legal aid is also available for legal advice.

Legal aid is means-tested. In practice it is available only to less than one-quarter of the population. It is administered by the Scottish Legal Aid Board. Legal Aid in Scotland is also available in Criminal Cases, where more than 90% of Summary applications are granted. An Interests of Justice test is applied, as well as a means test. In Solemn case (Jury Trials) the Court assesses Legal Aid.

=== Africa ===
==== South Africa ====
South Africa is a country that has reconstructed its legal systems in an attempt to mimic Western democratic countries, creating an arguably more just and fair justice system.

South Africa has a national judiciary as well as, in some areas, a tribal form of administration of justice. This is described as "legal pluralism". The informal "indigenous laws" are substantially different from the rest of the nation's laws and customs, hindering the provision of legal advice. However, the indigenous justice system in South Africa does not require representation, thus essentially eliminating the need for accessible legal aid.

Mimicking the British legal system, South Africa has barristers, which work in the senior courts, and solicitors, which provide out-of-court advice and work in the lower courts.

In 1969 the government of South Africa recognized a need for legal aid, and responded by creating the South African Legal Aid Board which began its work in 1971 and now provides the majority of legal aid throughout the country. The Board has autonomy and is independent from government in its decision-making, and has sole jurisdiction over determining the provision of legal aid. The Board provides legal aid to all "qualifying indigent individuals" with an income of R600.00 or less. If individuals do not meet this qualification they are provided other methods of obtaining a lawyer, such as hiring one or, if this is not within their means, finding one who will work pro bono.

In a reflection of the history of apartheid in South Africa, nearly 85% of all lawyers in South Africa are white. The government has determined greater racial diversity in the field of law is a priority and there are travelling "clinics" to help provide education on South African law throughout the country, with the aim of spreading knowledge as wide as possible, though especially in poorer areas.

More than 80% of the Legal Aid Board's funding is directed towards provision of defence advocates in criminal cases. This is generally explained in South Africa as being the result of two causes: the majority of crimes being committed by those who are poor, and the provision of defence in criminal cases being a priority compared to civil suits. Prior to the enactment of the 1994 Constitution, 80% of all people tried as criminals went unrepresented, as there was no right to a defence and no obligation on the government to provide that defence. Upon adoption of the 1994 Constitution the South African government was obliged to create organizations such as the Legal Aid Board to help facilitate access to legal aid.

For those who seek assistance and are aware of their own role in the justice system, legal aid in South Africa is available through:

- Uncompensated private counsel (pro bono work)
- Candidate attorneys in rural law firms funded by the state
- Private counsel funded by the state (judiciary)
- Independent university law clinics
- State funded law clinics
- State funded justice centers (one stop legal aid centers)
- Private specialist law firms
- Paralegal advice offices
- Legal insurance schemes

All of these services exist and are protected by subsidies and incentives. However, these services have been open to criticism, with some saying that these extensive services that are unique to South Africa do not matter if there is no adequate education that these options are available to people. In response, the South African government has encouraged South African law schools to expand their reach and establish travelling "legal clinics" and encouraging schools to add a "legal literacy curriculum" to spread knowledge of this area.

==== Nigeria ====
Legal Aid Council, Nigeria was established to provide legal services and access to justice to poor and marginalized Nigerians whose rights have been breached and who cannot afford the services of legal practitioners or who do not have the financial means to seek redress through the judicial system. The council is a government agency under the supervision of the Nigerian Ministry of Justice. The council was set up through Decree 56 of 1976, and was adopted into the 1979 constitution as Section 42 (40)(b). It was amended to Legal Aid (Amendment) Decree No.10 of 1986, to add civil matters to the council's jurisdiction. This was further amended to Decree 22 of 1994 to include damages for breach of fundamental human rights as guaranteed under the 1979 Constitution; The Decree was later codified into the Legal Aid Council Act Cap L9 Laws of the Federation of Nigeria 2004 and the Legal Aid Act Cap L9, 2004 Laws of the Federation of Nigeria (LFN), and all these amendments were consolidated in the 2011 Legal Aid Act.

The main objective of the constitutional amendments was to enhance access to justice for as many as seek redress by expanding the scope of free legal advice, assistance, representation and to provide Alternative Dispute Resolution (ADR) as a means of speedy pathway to getting justice. The mandate of the Council covers legal representation for indigent Nigerians in case of murder of any degree, manslaughter, malicious or grievous hurt, common assault or assault with bodily harm, affray, stealing, rape and armed robbery. The Council mostly assists persons whose earning is below the national minimum wage although exceptions can be made in rare instances. It also provides free legal services to those in custodial centres.

The council had initiated the Police Duty Solicitors Scheme (PDSS) in 2004 in partnership with the Open Society for Justice Initiative (OSJI) and the Nigeria Police Force to curtail long excessive pretrial detention and associated human rights abuses by providing free legal advice to suspects. The council has also led the charge in the certification of curriculum for Paralegal Studies in Tertiary Institutions in Nigeria.

The council has a governing board which is made up of 15 members who are appointed by the President and drawn from the office of the Attorney General of the Federation, the Federal Ministry of Finance, the Inspector General of Police, the National Youth Service Corp, Nigeria Correctional Service, Nigerian Union of Journalists (NUJ), Nigerian Labour Congress (NLC), International Federation of Women Lawyers (FIDA) and the Nigerian Bar Association.

The Council formulates policies while the management committee headed by the Director-General is in charge of the day-to-day operation of the organization. It works mainly through 7 departments headed by Directors namely; Criminal Justice, Civil Justice, Prison Decongestion, Human Resource Management, Finance and Accounts, International Operations and Corporate Affairs and Planning, Research and Statistics departments. The council has offices in all the 36 States of Nigeria and the Federal capital territory headed by State coordinators who report to the zonal officers in the 6 geopolitical of the country.

=== North America ===
==== Canada ====
In Canada, the modern system of legal aid developed after the federal government instituted a system of cost-sharing between the federal and provincial governments in the early 1970s. The federal financial contribution was originally set at 50% of the cost of the legal aid system, but that level of funding has fluctuated over the years.

The actual delivery of legal aid is by the provincial governments, as part of provincial jurisdiction over the administration of justice. For example, Legal Aid Ontario provides legal services for residents of Ontario, the Legal Services Society provides it to residents of British Columbia, and Commission des Services Juridiques does the same in the province of Quebec.

==== United States ====
Legal aid in criminal cases is a universal right guaranteed by the Sixth Amendment to the United States Constitution. A number of delivery models for legal aid have emerged in the United States. The Legal Services Corporation was authorized at the federal level to oversee these programs. In a "staff attorney" model, lawyers are employed by levels of government on salary solely to provide legal assistance to qualifying low-income clients, similar to staff doctors in a public hospital. In a "judicare" model, private lawyers and law firms are paid to handle cases from eligible clients alongside cases from fee-paying clients, much like doctors are paid to handle Medicare patients in the U.S. The "community legal clinic" model comprises non-profit clinics serving a particular community through a broad range of legal services (e.g. representation, education, law reform) and provided by both lawyers and non-lawyers, similar to community health clinics.

Defendants under criminal prosecution who cannot afford to hire an attorney are not only guaranteed legal aid related to the charges, but they are guaranteed legal representation, either in the form of public defenders, or in absence of provisions for such or due to case overloads, a court-appointed attorney.

The discussion surrounding legal aid and who is privileged to such a service has been criticized by law academics who assert that those who dominate and write the narratives of people who seek legal aid are individuals who benefit from the client narrative being one of inescapable poverty and desperation of an individual. Critiques assert that these asymmetrical, schematically constructed client profiles are required of civic legal aid programs in the capitalist framework of the United States as a tool to appeal to donors and other sources of funding. These representations and assessments of who seeks and deserves legal aid are argued to contribute to a culture of blaming the victims of poverty, as the narratives exclude the role the state and other civic stakeholders play in the creation of these client circumstances. However, legal aid is not provided in civil suits, nor deportation procedures, as these are not criminal proceedings. Some cities and a few states have passed tenant right to counsel, which provides legal representation and aid for tenants facing eviction.

Civil legal aid continues to be inaccessible for many low-income Americans. According to the 2022 Justice Gap Report by the Legal Services Corporation, low-income Americans were provided either no legal assistance or insufficient legal assistance for 92% of their significant civil legal issues. The disparity between the legal assistance required by low-income Americans and the assistance that is available to them is considerable.

=== Oceania ===
==== Australia ====
Australia has a federal system of government comprising federal, state and territory jurisdictions. The Australian (Commonwealth) and state and territory governments are each responsible for the provision of legal aid for matters arising under their laws. In addition there is a network of approximately 200 independent, not for profit, community legal centres.

Legal aid for both Commonwealth and state matters is primarily delivered through state and territory legal aid commissions (LACs), which are independent statutory agencies established under state and territory legislation. The Australian Government funds the provision of legal aid for Commonwealth family, civil and criminal law matters under agreements with state and territory governments and LACs. The majority of Commonwealth matters fall within the family law jurisdiction.

Legal aid commissions use a mixed model to deliver legal representation services. A grant of assistance legal representation may be assigned to either a salaried in-house lawyer or referred to a private legal practitioner. The mixed model is particularly advantageous for providing services to clients in regional areas and in cases where a conflict of interest means the same lawyer cannot represent both parties.

The Australian Government and most state and territory governments also fund community legal centres, which are independent, non-profit organisations which provide referral, advice and assistance to people with legal problems. Additionally, the Australian Government funds financial assistance for legal services under certain statutory schemes and legal services for Indigenous Australians.

By way of history, the Australian Government established the Legal Services Bureaux in 1942 to develop a national system. In 1973 the Attorney-General in the Whitlam Labor government, Lionel Murphy, established the Australian Legal Aid Office. Murphy recognised the urgent need for legal aid in order for justice to be equally available for all. Murphy recognised that: "one of the basic causes of the inequality of citizens before the laws is the absence of adequate and comprehensive legal aid arrangements throughout Australia ... The ultimate object of the Government is that legal aid be readily and equally available to citizens everywhere in Australia and that aid be extended for advice and assistance of litigation as well as for litigation in all legal categories and in all courts." (Senator the Hon Lionel Murphy AO QC, Attorney General) The establishment of the Australian Legal Aid Office in 1973 was followed by the establishment of state-based Legal Aid Commissions. These offices now provide the majority of free or lowcost legal assistance to those in need. In 1977, the Australian Government enacted the Commonwealth Legal Aid Commission Act 1977 (LAC Act), which established cooperative arrangements between the Australian Government and state and territory governments, under which legal aid would be provided by independent legal aid commissions to be established under state and territory legislation. The process of establishing the LACs took more than a decade. It commenced in 1976 with the establishment of the Legal Aid Commission of Western Australia, followed in 1978 the Legal Aid Commission of Victoria (LACV), and ended in 1990 with the establishment of the Legal Aid Commission of Tasmania. The cooperative arrangements that were established by the LAC Act provided for Commonwealth and state and territory legal aid funding agreements, which began in 1987.

In July 1997, the Australian Government changed its arrangements to directly fund legal aid services for Commonwealth law matters. Under this arrangement, the states and territories fund assistance in respect of their own laws. In 2013, a murder trial in the Supreme Court of Victoria was delayed because legal aid was unavailable. This has been cited as the effect of a reduction in government-funding for legal aid agencies in Australia and led to an increase in popularity for online legal aid resources such as the Law Handbook and LawAnswers.

Legal aid in Australia was discussed in the case of Dietrich v The Queen (1992). It was found that although there is no absolute right to have publicly funded counsel, in most circumstances a judge should grant any request for an adjournment or stay when an accused is unrepresented.

==== New Zealand ====
The legal aid system in New Zealand provides Government-funded legal assistance in limited circumstances to those who are unable to afford a lawyer. In most cases, Legal Aid takes the form of a loan which defendants must repay. Legal aid is available for almost all court actions across all levels of the court system for those who are able to meet the rigorous eligibility requirements. This includes criminal charges, civil issues, family disputes, appeals and Waitangi Tribunal claims.

== See also ==
- Access to Justice Initiatives
- Avocats Sans Frontières
- Environmental Dispute Resolution Fund
- Judicial assistance
- Law enforcement
- Legal awareness
- Legal clinic
- Mutual legal assistance treaty
- Pro Bono Net
- Public defender
- West Coast Environmental Law
