= Voluntary intoxication in English law =

Voluntary intoxication, where a defendant has wilfully consumed drink or drugs before committing acts which constitute the prohibited conduct (actus reus) of an offence, has posed a considerable problem for the English criminal law. There is a correspondence between incidence of drinking and crimes of violence, such as assaults and stabbings. Accordingly, there is a debate about the effect of voluntary intoxication on the mental element of crimes, which is often that the defendant foresaw the consequences, or that they intended them.

In dealing with this issue and balancing theoretical problems with public policy issues, the English law has categorised offences into two categories, those of basic intent and those of specific intent. In the latter, the defendant's intoxication will be directly relevant in forming the necessary intent. In the former, the picture is more complicated and unclear, although it is known that intoxication will not provide a defence where recklessness can be shown on the accepted facts. Crimes of specific intent include murder, and those of basic intent most crimes of recklessness, including manslaughter.

== Basis ==
There is a widely held belief that alcohol consumption fuels violence. The picture may be more complex involving other factors, including the effects of chronic alcohol abuse rather than its immediate effects.

Neither voluntary nor involuntary intoxication provide a defence in English law in themselves. No behavior is excusable merely because it was committed whilst intoxicated, and the phrase "a drunken intent is still an intent" – used in Sheehan –has not been abandoned. Where an individual voluntarily intoxicates himself, it is not a defence for him to then claim he does not intend any actions he commits while intoxicated. The Earl of Birkenhead stated in 1920 that until the early 19th century voluntary drunkenness was never a defence, based on the principle that "a man who by his own voluntary act debauches and destroys his will power shall be no better situated in regard to criminal acts than a sober man". This was considered the authority by Lord Elwyn-Jones in the Majewski case. Instead, intoxication may assist the defence arguing that the defendant lacked the appropriate mens rea (mental element) for the crime. However, it has been recognised at common law that those who would not intend to commit a crime if sober cannot be held to the same level of culpability as those who would. Thus, the approach of the courts is generally to find intoxicated individuals guilty of crimes which require basic intent, rather than the specific intent required for other crimes.

== Specific and basic intent ==
In Majewski, Lord Elwyn-Jones, giving judgement, indicated that a crime was one of specific intent if the mens rea went further than the actus reus (prohibited acts, as they actually occurred); in other words, that the crime was one of ulterior intent. This makes sense in the case of burglary and of criminal damage with intent to endanger life, where the intent need not be carried out, and which have been judged crimes of specific intent. However, this fails to explain why murder is considered a crime of specific intent, despite the fact that its mental aspect, intent to cause grievous bodily harm or death, is equal or less than the actus reus requirement of causing death. Similarly, causing gross bodily harm with intent (contrary to section 18 of the Offences Against the Person Act 1861) has a matching mens rea and yet is also considered a crime of specific intent.

Lord Simon's judgement in the same case advanced a different definition: crimes of specific intent required a "purposive element". The court in Heard considered a specific intent one which fitted either possible definition. However, murder is again an exception: since Woolin, it can be committed not by intent but by virtual certainty and foresight of virtual certainty. Lord Elwyn-Jones also expressed that if a crime could be committed recklessly, it was one of basic intent. This is supported by a number of academics, who do however consider it a matter for the common law to establish by precedent.

The distinction between crimes of specific and basic intent is demonstrated by the intoxication case of R v Lipman. Here, a man who had voluntarily taken LSD struck and asphyxiated a woman while hallucinating, believing her to be a snake. The man was found to lack the specific intent required of murder, but satisfied the basic intention of manslaughter, that of recklessness. While it has been argued that there is no consistent principle behind the distinction, there has been some judicial effort to suggest a means of categorisation.

=== Intoxication and specific intent ===
Case law has established that murder, wounding or causing grievous bodily harm with intent, theft, robbery, burglary with intent to steal, handling stolen goods, some forms of criminal damage, and any attempt to commit a crime of specific intent are themselves crimes of specific intent.

Where the defendant is on trial for a crime of specific intent, his state of intoxication will be relevant to whether he formed the required intent. This may prevent the defendant from having the required mens rea. If the defendant's intoxication is so significant as to prevent any sort of intent, this can lead to acquittal. A reduction in the strength of the formed intent is insufficient. In coming to this conclusion, the court in Sheehan placed a new interpretation on the words of Lord Birkenhead in Beard, taking account of the decision in Woolmington. Lord Birkenhead's words had been that intoxication would be relevant where it prevented the defendant from beingcapable of forming the necessary intent.

=== Intoxication and basic intent ===
Manslaughter, rape, sexual assault, maliciously wounding or inflicting grievous bodily harm, kidnapping and false imprisonment, assault occasioning actual bodily harm and common assault have all been judged crimes of basic intent. Attempting a crime of basic intent may be a crime of basic intent, but this is unclear.

The court in Majewski refers to intoxication as a defence. If this were the case, in crimes of basic intent where it does not provide a defence, the counsel for the defendant could not argue that the defendant did not have the required mens rea because of intoxication. Accordingly, the mens rea become irrelevant and the Crown need not show it, thereby aiding the prosecution considerably. The alternative is that the voluntary intoxication provides a "prior fault" which substitutes for the mens rea required. This would leave the prosecution the task of showing voluntary intoxication to the satisfaction of the jury and the avoidance of doubt. However, the taking of alcohol or drugs probably bears little similarity to the rest of the crime the defendant stands accused of it. It is removed in both its nature and possibly significantly in time. The alternative would be to require the prosecution to still show the required mens rea. The defendant's intoxication would be disregarded and the defendant's state of mind assessed as it was. It would, however, rapidly become a question of whether the defendant would have foreseen the consequences had he been sober. This would, however, necessarily require finding defendants such as Lipman guilty, even where he was unconscious.

Neither possibility has been explored in the common law. Accordingly, it only possible to say that the defence cannot argue that intoxication provides a defence, where recklessness has been shown on the fact, in crimes of basic intent. It is possible that the prosecution would be allowed, in certain circumstances, to dispense with the original mens rea entirely and rely solely on the voluntary intoxication to provide the fault element.

== Different types of drugs ==
The case law on voluntary intoxication, and the Majewski doctrine, has focussed on intoxication by alcohol. In Lipman this was extended to the illegal drug LSD, well known for its hallucinative effects. In respect of other drugs, courts have restricted the scope of the Majewski formulation: in Bailey, a diabetic's failure to eat as advised after taking a quantity of insulin was not considered voluntary intoxication; in Hardie, a taker of diazepam (Valium) was similarly excluded. They established a further test, in order to exclude these types of defendants from a voluntary intoxication rule with a non-applicable public policy basis.

Based on a physiological distinction that did not exist in a medical sense, the court distinguished between alcohol and illegal drugs on one hand, and "therapeutic" or "merely soporific or sedative" drugs on the other. Therefore, the question is twofold: to find voluntary intoxication, the defendant must appreciate that taking the drug may lead to "aggressive, unpredictable and uncontrollable conduct" (Bailey), but only generally speaking – he need not foresee any particular crime occurring.

== See also ==
- Intoxication in English law
