= R v Kingston =

1994 House of Lords case on involuntary intoxication in English criminal law

- Court: House of Lords
- Full case name: Regina v Barry Kingston
- Decided: 21 July 1994
- Citation: [1994] UKHL 9; [1995] 2 AC 355; [1994] 3 WLR 519; [1994] 3 All ER 353; [1994] Crim LR 846

Case history
- Prior actions: Conviction for indecent assault (Crown Court, 1992); conviction quashed, [1994] QB 81; (1993) 97 Cr App R 401; [1993] Crim LR 781 (CA)
- Subsequent action: Remitted to the Court of Appeal on the remaining grounds of appeal

Case opinions
- Lord Mustill, with whom the other members of the Appellate Committee agreed

Keywords
- Involuntary intoxication; mens rea; defences; disinhibition

R v Kingston [1995] 2 AC 355 is a decision of the House of Lords on the effect of involuntary intoxication in English criminal law. The defendant, who had been secretly drugged by a man seeking to blackmail him, indecently assaulted a fifteen-year-old boy. The Court of Appeal quashed his conviction, holding that where a surreptitiously administered drug causes a person to form a criminal intent that he would not otherwise have formed, the law should excuse him because the fault lies with another. The House of Lords unanimously reversed that decision and restored the conviction. Lord Mustill held that an intent formed under the influence of a drug is nonetheless an intent: involuntary intoxication is relevant only insofar as it shows that the defendant did not in fact form the mens rea required for the offence, and English law recognises no free-standing defence of involuntary intoxication where that mental element is proved.

The case remains the leading English authority on the point. It is commonly read as affirming that the criminal law's inquiry into mens rea is an inquiry into the defendant's actual state of mind rather than into his moral blameworthiness for having that state of mind, and it has attracted sustained academic criticism on that ground.

== Background ==
Before Kingston, English law on intoxication had developed principally in relation to intoxication that was voluntary. In DPP v Majewski the House of Lords held that self-induced intoxication may be relied on to show the absence of the intent required for an offence of "specific intent", but not for an offence of "basic intent", for which the defendant's recklessness in becoming intoxicated supplies the fault. In R v Sheehan and Moore the Court of Appeal had stated that, where intent is in issue, the question is simply whether the defendant formed it, since "a drunken intent is nevertheless an intent".

Intoxication that was not self-induced had received far less attention. R v Hardie concerned a sedative taken voluntarily but with unexpected effects, and held that the Majewski rule did not apply where the drug was one not commonly known to produce unpredictability or aggressiveness. In R v Allen, by contrast, a defendant who had drunk wine without appreciating its strength was held to have become intoxicated voluntarily. The only older authority for an exculpatory rule was a dictum attributed to Park J in Pearson's Case, which in turn drew on Sir Matthew Hale's statement that a person made drunk "by the unskilfulness of his physician, or by the contrivance of his enemies" would be excused as if insane.

== Facts ==
Barry Kingston, the respondent before the House of Lords, was a businessman with homosexual paedophilic inclinations which, on the case presented at trial, he had previously been able to control. Former business associates of his wished to obtain compromising material with which to blackmail him, and engaged a co-accused, Penn, to that end. Penn lured a fifteen-year-old boy to his flat and gave him drink and drugs, after which the boy fell asleep. Kingston then visited the flat and, it was alleged, was himself given a drink into which Penn had secretly introduced a drug. Kingston indecently assaulted the sleeping boy while Penn photographed the assault and recorded it on audio tape.

Kingston and Penn were tried before Potts J. Kingston's case was that he had been drugged and that, had he not been, he would not have acted as he did. The judge directed the jury that if they were sure that Kingston had assaulted the boy with the necessary intent, the fact that he might have been drugged was no answer, "because a drugged intent is still an intent". The jury convicted Kingston of indecent assault by a majority and convicted Penn of indecent assault and of administering a drug; each defendant was sentenced to five years' imprisonment, with a further consecutive year for Penn on the second count.

== Court of Appeal ==
The Court of Appeal, before Lord Taylor of Gosforth CJ, Pill and Sedley JJ, allowed Kingston's appeal and quashed the conviction. Lord Taylor reasoned that the purpose of the criminal law is to inhibit conduct which individuals would otherwise be tempted to engage in. If a person's inhibitions are removed by a drug which another has surreptitiously administered to him, and he consequently forms an intent which he would not otherwise have formed, the operative fault is not his, and the law should exculpate him. On that view, involuntary intoxication could negative the mens rea of an offence even though the defendant had, as a matter of fact, intended his act. Because the trial judge's direction had withdrawn that issue from the jury, the conviction could not stand.

The court certified that its decision involved a point of law of general public importance, concerning whether a defence of involuntary intoxication was available where the defendant had the requisite intent, and on whom the burden of proof lay, and the Crown appealed to the House of Lords.

== House of Lords ==
The House of Lords allowed the Crown's appeal. Lord Mustill delivered the only reasoned speech, with which the other members of the Appellate Committee agreed.

=== Involuntary intoxication and intent ===
Lord Mustill proceeded on the footing that the jury might have found that Kingston had been drugged and that the drug had lowered his inhibitions. He held that the Court of Appeal's reasoning involved a fallacy: it treated the absence of moral fault as though it negatived the mental element of the offence. The mental element of indecent assault is the intention to commit the act; it is not displaced by showing that the defendant, through no fault of his own, was less able to resist a temptation to commit it. Where the defendant in fact formed the intent, disinhibition or a loss of self-control induced by a drug does not alter that fact. The trial judge's direction that "a drugged intent is still an intent" was accordingly correct.

Involuntary intoxication therefore remains relevant, but only in the ordinary way. Where the drug is such that the defendant does not form the intent at all, he lacks mens rea and must be acquitted; if the intoxication was involuntary, the restriction imposed by Majewski on reliance upon intoxication in offences of basic intent does not apply.

=== Rejection of a new defence ===
Lord Mustill next considered whether the common law already recognised, or should now recognise, a distinct defence of involuntary intoxication operating even where intent was proved. He found no such defence in the authorities. Of the dictum in Pearson's Case, he said: "I cannot place reliance on this dictum as a foundation for a modern law of involuntary intoxication."

He declined to create the defence judicially. He observed that it would be available, in principle, across the whole range of offences; that it would ordinarily depend on evidence which the defendant alone could give and which the prosecution would have great difficulty in testing or rebutting; and that its proper limits, such as the degree of disinhibition required and the treatment of a defendant who was predisposed to the conduct in question, raised questions of policy better suited to examination by the Law Commission and to legislation than to development by the courts in a single case. The appropriate means of reflecting the defendant's reduced culpability, in his view, lay in the sentence.

The conviction was restored and the case remitted to the Court of Appeal to deal with the remaining grounds of appeal.

== Significance and reception ==
Kingston settled that English law does not recognise involuntary intoxication as an excuse distinct from the denial of mens rea. The decision is frequently cited for the proposition that mens rea in English law is a descriptive inquiry into the defendant's state of mind, and that moral innocence, however compelling, does not of itself negative it.

The decision has been criticised on the ground that it convicts a defendant whose wrongful conduct was procured by another's deliberate wrongdoing, and who, on the facts assumed, would not otherwise have offended. Catherine Crosby examined the case against competing theories of culpability and the Law Commission's later proposals, arguing that the outcome sits uneasily with a choice-based or character-based account of criminal responsibility. Thom Brooks argued that the conventional account, under which involuntary intoxication leads to acquittal of fault-based offences, oversimplifies the law, and proposed a six-step procedure for determining when involuntary intoxication is engaged and whether it should result in acquittal.

=== Law reform ===
In its 2009 report Intoxication and Criminal Liability, the Law Commission for England and Wales concentrated on voluntary intoxication. It treated involuntary intoxication as a much less significant problem in practice and did not recommend altering the substance of the law as stated in Kingston.

Other common law jurisdictions have taken a different view. The Law Reform Commission of Ireland recommended in 1995 that involuntary intoxication should always afford a defence on the lines indicated by the Court of Appeal in Kingston. In Australia, section 8.5 of the Commonwealth Criminal Code Act 1995 provides that a person is not criminally responsible for an offence if the conduct constituting the offence was a result of intoxication that was not self-induced. The Attorney-General's Department's guide to the Code notes that this defence has no common law counterpart, the House of Lords having rejected the Court of Appeal's recognition of such a defence in Kingston.

== See also ==
- Intoxication in English law
- DPP v Majewski
- R v Hardie
- Automatism (law)
