= Diminished responsibility in English law =

Partial defence to murder in English law

In English law, diminished responsibility is one of the partial defenses that reduce the offense from murder to manslaughter if successful (termed "voluntary" manslaughter for these purposes). This allows the judge sentencing discretion, e.g. to impose a hospital order under section 37 of the Mental Health Act 1983 to ensure treatment rather than punishment in appropriate cases. Thus, when the actus reus (Latin for "guilty act") of death is accompanied by an objective or constructive version of mens rea (Latin for "guilty mind"), the subjective evidence that the defendant did intend to kill or cause grievous bodily harm because of a mental incapacity will partially excuse his conduct. Under s.2(2) of the Homicide Act 1957 the burden of proof is on the defendant to the balance of probabilities. The M'Naghten Rules lack a volitional limb of "irresistible impulse"; diminished responsibility is the volitional mental condition defense in English criminal law.

== The statutory provision ==
Section 2 of the Homicide Act 1957 states: (1) Where a person kills or is party to a killing of another, he shall not be convicted of murder if he was suffering from an abnormality of mental functioning which -

- (a) arose from a medical condition
- (b) substantially impaired D's ability to do one or more of the things mentioned in subsection (1A), and
- (c) provides an explanation for D's acts and omissions in doing or being a party to the killing.

(1A) Those things are -

- (a) to understand the nature of D's conduct;
- (b) to form a rational judgment;
- (c) to exercise self-control.

(1B) For the purposes of subsection (1)(c), an abnormality of mental functioning provides and explanation of D's conduct if it causes, or is a significant contributory factor in causing, D to carry out that conduct.

The defence has recently been amended by s. 52 of the Coroners and Justice Act 2009, which came into force on 4 October 2010.

=== How substantial must the impairment be? ===
R v Golds provides a recent authority from the Court of Appeal Criminal Division on how the courts will interpret the term 'substantial'. At paragraph [55] of Elias LJ's judgment (following the paragraphing from the neutral citation given below) two senses of the word 'substantial' are identified: (i) something substantial is more than something which is merely trivial or minimal if it has "substance", or (ii) something substantial is big or large (e.g. in the sense that a substantial salary is a large one). At paragraph [72] Elias LJ concludes by opining that the court should (i) leave interpretation of the word 'substantial' to the jury, but if asked for further help should (ii) direct them under the second meaning of the term (i.e. substantial meaning big).

=== Diminished responsibility and voluntary intoxication ===
Voluntary intoxication will not satisfy the criterion that there must be an abnormality of mental functioning arising from a recognised medical condition (s.2(1)(a) Homicide Act 1957) and therefore cannot be relied upon as grounds for the partial defence. However a person suffering from alcoholism that has led to an abnormality of mental function may have access to the partial defence. In R v Gittens a defendant who suffered from depression killed his wife and stepdaughter after drinking and taking drugs for medication. The direction to a jury facing both diminished responsibility and drunkenness should be:

- Would the defendant have killed as he did if he had not been drunk?

and if the answer to that is yes,

- Was he suffering from diminished responsibility when he did so?

The more chronic forms of alcoholism and the long-term use of heroin and cocaine (see R v Sanderson) can become a relevant factor where a craving for drink or drugs causes an abnormality of mind. This must be distinguished from the situation in which the abnormality of mind causes a craving for drink or drugs . R v Tandy held that where a defendant could show that she was suffering from an abnormality of the mind, that it was induced by disease (namely alcoholism), and that it substantially impaired her responsibility for her actions, then the defence of diminished responsibility would be made out. In the actual case, the craving for alcohol did not render the use of alcohol involuntary. The defendant was in control when she began drinking, and the state of mind in which she killed her daughter was merely induced by the alcohol. In R v Dietschmann, the House of Lords held that where a defendant suffers from an abnormality of mind within s2(1) also consumes alcohol before the killing, the jury should find him or her guilty of manslaughter if they are satisfied that, notwithstanding the alcohol consumed and its effect, the abnormality of mind substantially impaired the mental responsibility for the fatal acts. The sub-section does not require the abnormality of mind to be the sole cause of the defendant’s acts; even if the defendant would not have killed if he had not consumed alcohol, the causative effect of the alcohol does not prevent an abnormality of mind suffered by the defendant from substantially impairing his mental responsibility for the fatal acts. Dietschmann was later applied by the Court of Appeal in R v Hendy.

== See also ==
- Killing of Richard Challen
