= R v Cheshire =

English criminal law case

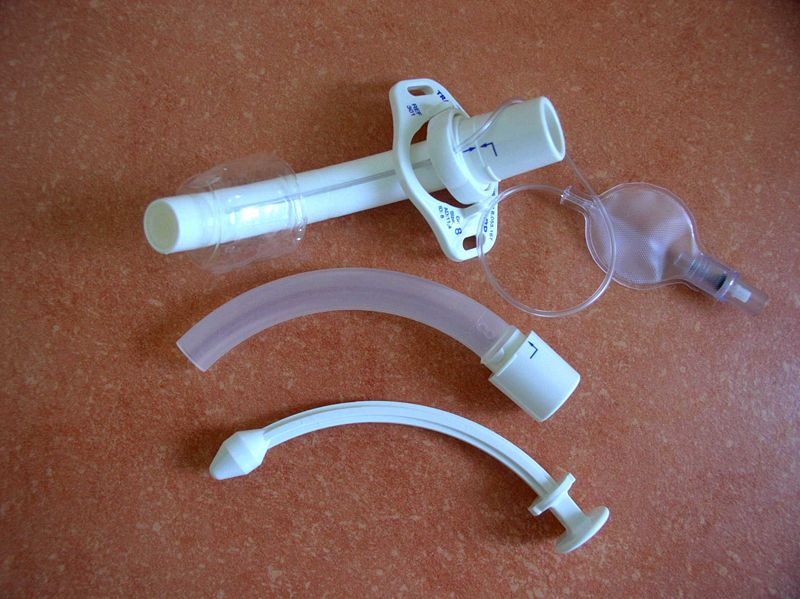
- Court: Court of Appeal
- Full case name: R v Cheshire (David William)
- Decided: 22 April 1991
- Citations: [1991] 1 WLR 844; [1991] 3 All ER 670; (1991) 93 Cr App R 251; [1991] Crim LR 709; (1991) 141 NLJ 743; (1991) 135 SJ 11; The Times, 24 April 1991

Case history
- Subsequent action: none

Court membership
- Judges sitting: Beldam LJ, Boreham J and Auld J

Case opinions
- Beldam LJ delivering the judgment of the court (per curiam)

Keywords
- Breaking the chain (Novus actus interveniens); causation; homicide

R v Cheshire [1991] 1 WLR 844 is an English criminal law case establishing the role of the jury in finding liability for death, where subsequent medical negligence occurs following the original injury. The Court of Appeal found that the jury did not have to weigh up different causes of death, and need only be satisfied that the defendant's actions made a "significant contribution" to the victim's death.

== Facts ==
On 9 December 1987, the appellant attacked and shot a man in a fish and chip shop, following an argument. The victim was admitted to hospital and underwent surgery, though he developed a respiratory problem requiring a tracheostomy tube to be inserted into his windpipe. On 8 February 1988, and again on 14 February, the victim complained that he was having difficulty breathing, dying shortly after. Medical evidence at the defendant's trial was given that the victim's death was the result of his doctor's failure to diagnose the reason behind his breathlessness and respiratory obstruction. Nevertheless, the defendant was convicted, with the trial judge instructing the jury they could find the defendant's chain of causation could only be broken if they were satisfied that the medical staff had been reckless in their treatment.

== Judgment ==
The Court of Appeal, having been referred to the earlier judgment of R v Jordan, rejected the appellant's argument that the trial judge had misdirected the jury with regard to the medical staff's acts. Lord Justice Roy Beldam stated that it was only necessary for the Crown to prove that the defendant's actions caused the victim's death, but not that they need be the only or even main cause of death. As a general principle, the Court stated that:

Even though negligence in the treatment of the victim was the immediate cause of his death, the jury should not regard it as excluding the responsibility of the defendant unless the negligent treatment was so independent of his acts, and in itself so potent in causing death, that they regard the contribution made by his acts as insignificant.

The judgment therefore consigns the verdict given in R v Jordan to exceptional cases where the operative cause of death is not the result of the defendant's acts. The ordinary consideration for a jury must be whether the negligent treatment of a victim is so independent of the defendant's acts that it renders them insignificant to the eventual death.

== See also ==
- R v Jordan
- R v Smith (Thomas Joseph)
