= Murder in English law =

Crime in England and Wales

Murder is an offence under the common law legal system of England and Wales. It is considered the most serious form of homicide, in which one person kills another with the intention to unlawfully cause either death or serious injury. The element of intentionality was originally termed malice aforethought, although it required neither malice nor premeditation. Baker states that many killings done with a high degree of subjective recklessness were treated as murder from the 12th century right through until the 1974 decision in DPP v Hyam.

Because murder is generally defined in law as an intent to cause serious harm or injury (alone or with others), combined with a death arising from that intention, there are certain circumstances where a death will be treated as murder even if the defendant did not wish to kill the actual victim. This is called "transferred malice", and arises in two common cases:

- The defendant intended serious harm to one or more persons, but an unintended other person dies as a result;
- Several people share an intent to do serious harm, and the victim dies because of the action of any of those involved (for example, if another person goes "further than expected" or performs an unexpectedly lethal action).

== Definition ==
Murder is defined, at common law rather than by statute, as the unlawful killing of a reasonable person in being under the King or Queen's peace with malice aforethought express or implied.

=== Actus reus ===
The actus reus (Latin for "guilty act") of murder was defined in common law by Coke:

Murder is when a man of sound memory and of the age of discretion, unlawfully killeth within any county of the realm any reasonable creature in rerum natura under the King's peace, with malice aforthought, either expressed by the party or implied by law, so as the party wounded, or hurt, etc. die of the wound or hurt, etc. within a year and a day of the same.

The latter clause (known as the 'year and a day rule') was abolished in 1996 (see below).

A further historic rule, the felony murder rule, was abolished in the Homicide Act 1957. Until abolition, the effect of this rule had been to create murder offences in two cases: when manslaughter occurs during the course of a crime it could in certain cases be automatically reclassified by law as murder; and that any deaths resulting from acts of a criminal during the crime could cause culpability as murder on the part of all his or her fellow criminals. The effect of this rule is partly retained despite abolition, since intent to kill is not necessary – intent (including common intent) to cause serious injury is sufficient for murder if death results.

==== "Unlawfully" ====
"Unlawfully" means without lawful justification or excuse.

==== Causation and foreseeability ====
For a killing to amount to murder by a defendant, at the time of death the defendant's acts or omissions must be the operating and most substantial cause of death with no novus actus interveniens (Latin for "new act breaking in") to break the chain of causation. Thus, the defendant cannot choose how the victim is to act, nor what personality to have. No matter whether brave or foolish, the defendant must expect the victim to:

- try to escape and if he or she dies in that attempt, the chain of causation is not broken; or
- try to fight back and so escalate the extent of the violence between them; or
- seek medical treatment for the injuries sustained and, even if mistakes are made by the medical staff, this will not break the chain of causation unless the mistakes become the more substantial cause of death.

There are conflicting authorities on the above point, R v Jordan and R v Smith. In short, any contingency that is foreseeable will maintain the chain. Put the other way, only some unexpected act by a third party which places the original attack as a merely a background context, or some unpredictable natural phenomenon, will break the chain.

==== "In rerum natura" ====
For a killing to amount to murder by a defendant, the defendant must have caused the death of "a reasonable creature in rerum natura". The phrase as a whole is usually translated as "a life in being", i.e. where the umbilical cord has been severed and the baby has a life independently of the mother.

Attorney General's Reference No. 3 of 1994 (an appeal on a point of law following acquittal) is a relatively recent case involving a murder charge for the death of an unborn child. The Law Lords considered the case of a man who stabbed his pregnant wife in an argument. The wife recovered but delivered the baby prematurely. The baby died some time after the premature birth. The cause of death was simply that she had been born prematurely due to the effect of the attack on the mother, rather than due to any injury. In that case, Lord Mustill noted that the legal position of the unborn, and other pertinent rules related to transferred malice, were very strongly embedded in the structure of the law and had been considered relatively recently by the courts. The Lords concurred that a foetus, although protected by the law in a number of ways, is legally not a separate person from its mother in English law. They described this as outdated and misconceived but legally established as a principle, adding that the foetus might be or not be a person for legal purposes, but could not in modern times be described as a part of its mother. The concept of transferred malice and general malice were also not without difficulties; these are the legal principles that say when a person engages in an unlawful act, they are responsible for its consequences, including (a) harm to others unintended to be harmed, and (b) types of harm they did not intend.

As such in the above case where a husband stabbed his pregnant wife, causing premature birth, and the baby died due to that premature birth, in English law no murder took place. "Until she had been born alive and acquired a separate existence she could not be the victim of homicide". The requirements for murder under English law, involving transfer of malice to a foetus, and then (notionally) from a foetus to the born child with legal personality, who died as a child at a later time despite never having suffered harm as a child (with legal personality), nor even as a foetus having suffered any fatal wound (the injury sustained as a foetus was not a contributory cause), nor having malice deliberately directed at it, was described as legally "too far" to support a murder charge.

However, they did note that English law allowed for alternative remedies in some cases, and specifically those based on "unlawful act" and "gross negligence" manslaughter which does not require intent to harm the victim:

Lord Hope has, however, ... [directed] attention to the foreseeability on the part of the accused that his act would create a risk ... All that it [sic] is needed, once causation is established, is an act creating a risk to anyone; and such a risk is obviously established in the case of any violent assault ... The unlawful and dangerous act of B changed the maternal environment of the foetus in such a way that when born the child died when she would otherwise have lived. The requirements of causation and death were thus satisfied, and the four attributes of "unlawful act" manslaughter were complete.

Lord Hope drew attention to the parallel case of R v Mitchell where a blow aimed at one person caused another to suffer harm leading to later death, affirmed by the Court of Appeal as manslaughter, and summarized the legal position of the death of the unborn child:

As the defendant intended to commit that act [stabbing], all the ingredients necessary for mens rea in regard to the crime of manslaughter were established, irrespective of who was the ultimate victim of it. The fact that the child whom the mother was carrying at the time was born alive and then died as a result of the stabbing is all that was needed for the offence of manslaughter when actus reus for that crime was completed by the child's death. The question, once all the other elements are satisfied, is simply one of causation. The defendant must accept all the consequences of his act ... The death of the child was unintentional, but the nature and quality of the act which caused it was such that it was criminal and therefore punishable.

Four years later, the case St George's Healthcare NHS Trust v S; R v Collins and others, ex parte S [1998] 3 All ER 673 considered the willful killing of a foetus before birth, without maternal consent, in a medical context. It was held a trespass to the person that the hospital terminated the pregnancy involuntarily due to the mother being diagnosed with severe pre-eclampsia. The court held that an unborn child's need for medical assistance does not prevail over the mother's autonomy and she is entitled to refuse consent to treatment, whether her own life or that of her unborn child depends on it (see a discussion on omission).

It also can be contrasted against the United States federal Unborn Victims of Violence Act of 2004. Under this law, the intent to cause harm (mens rea) from the initial assault applies to any unborn child similarly to any other unplanned victim, and death or injury to the foetus is charged as a separate homicide whether or not the accused had actual knowledge or intent with respect to the child, or even knowledge of the pregnancy.

==== "Under the King's peace" ====
A killing is not murder if the person killed is not "under the King's peace". The killing of an alien enemy in the heat of war, and in the actual exercise thereof, is not murder because the alien enemy is not under the King's peace. The killing, otherwise than in the heat of war, and the actual exercise thereof, of an alien enemy, within the kingdom, is not excused by the fact that he is an alien enemy, and can, therefore, be murder. The effect of R v Depardo is that the same rule applies where an alien enemy is charged with killing a British subject.

See also R v Page.

Certain acts are excluded as murder, usually when the place or circumstances were deemed not to be under the King's peace at the time. Examples of killings not under the King's peace include the killing of an enemy combatant during a time of war or other international conflict. In the case of R v Clegg, a soldier in Northern Ireland was convicted of murder after shooting into the back of a fleeing vehicle and killing a joyrider who had driven past the checkpoint he was guarding, although the conviction was later overturned on appeal.

==== Transferred malice ====
In English law, transferred malice (known in some jurisdictions as "transferred intention") is a doctrine that states in some circumstances a person who intends to commit an offence involving harm to one individual and instead (or as well) harms another, may be charged with the latter as a crime – the mens rea (malicious intent) is 'transferred'. It may not apply when the crime which took place was different from the crime intended, although a charge of manslaughter may be possible in such cases.

==== Common intent ====
As well as being responsible for any murderous consequences of his or her own unlawful actions that affect others, a person may also be held liable for the unlawful actions of others he or she acts with, even if not agreed or planned, if there is a common (or shared) intention (sometimes called a "common purpose"). In the 1998 case R v Greatrex (David Anthony), the Court of Appeal summarised some of the legal circumstances this can apply:

[There are] two distinct paradigms of indirect responsibility for murder. One is the class of case in which, although there is no shared intent to kill or do serious harm, the secondary party knows that the other (usually but not necessarily because he is carrying a weapon) may kill or do serious harm in the course of the venture. (e.g. Chan Wing-Siu v The Queen [1984] 3 AER 877). The test is succinctly summarised in R. v Powell and Daniels 1996 as requiring "subjective realisation by the accused that his co-participant may commit murder and, notwithstanding that, his agreement to participate himself".

Its counterpart is the situation in R. v Anderson and Morris 1996 where two persons embark on an unlawful but not murderous enterprise and one of them commits a murder which the other had no way of foreseeing. The principle is illustrated in the well-known passage from the speech of Viscount Simmonds, L.C. in Davis v D.P.P. 1954 instancing a fight among a crowd of boys in which no more than common assaults are contemplated but in which one produces a knife of which the others know nothing and kills with it.

As the Court of Appeal, Criminal Division, explained in R. v Stewart 1995 such shared intent [to commit serious harm] renders each party criminally liable for the acts done in the course of carrying it out. It is only where the jury is not satisfied that the intent of any one defendant was to cause serious harm or to kill that participation will be negatived.

In R v Gnango (2011), the Supreme Court controversially held under the doctrine of joint enterprise and transferred malice that D2 is guilty of murdering V if D1 and D2 voluntarily engage in fighting each other, each intending to kill or cause grievous bodily harm to the other and each foreseeing that the other has the reciprocal intention, and if D1 mistakenly kills V in the course of the fight.

==== 'Year and a day' rule ====
The requirement that death occur within a year and a day of any injury for a killing to amount to murder was abolished by the Law Reform (Year and a Day Rule) Act 1996. Historically it had been considered that if a person survived more than that period after an incident, and died later, the incident could not be considered the proximate cause of death. Advances in modern medicine and patient care, including stabilized states such as coma which can last more than a year before death, made this assumption no longer appropriate.

=== Mens rea (intention) ===
The mens rea (Latin for "guilty mind") of murder is either an intention to kill (per the 2004 binding case of R v Matthews & Alleyne) or an intention to cause grievous bodily harm (R v Moloney, R v Hancock & Shankland, and R v Woollin). In Moloney, Lord Bridge was clear that, for the defendant to have the mens rea of murder, there must be something more than mere foresight or knowledge that death or serious injury is a "natural" consequence of the current activities: there must be clear evidence of an intention. This intention is proved not only when the defendant's motive or purpose is to kill or cause grievous bodily harm (direct intent), but when death or grievous bodily harm is a virtually certain consequence of the defendant's act (indirect or 'oblique' intent). Also in Moloney, Lord Bridge held that the mens rea of murder need not be aimed at a specific person so, if a terrorist plants a bomb in a public place, it is irrelevant that no specific individual is targeted so long as one or more deaths is virtually certain. Further, it is irrelevant that the terrorist might claim justification for the act through a political agenda. How or why one person kills could only have relevance to the sentence.

=== Concurrence (simultaneity) ===
For a killing to amount to murder, the actus reus and mens rea must coincide in point of time. The so-called single transaction principle allows a conviction where the defendant has both actus reus and mens rea together during the sequence of events leading to death. In Thabo Meli v R the defendants thought they had already killed their victim when they threw him over a cliff and abandoned the "body". Thus, although the act actually causing death was performed when the defendants did not have the intention to kill, the conviction was confirmed. Concurrence is also known as simultaneity or contemporaneity.

=== Jurisdiction ===
An offence of murder by a British subject "may be dealt with, inquired of, tried, determined, and punished" in England and Wales wherever in the world the killing took place and no matter what the nationality of the victim.

==== Visiting forces ====
Murder is an offence against the person for the purposes of section 3 of the Visiting Forces Act 1952.

=== The terminally ill or incapacitated, 'mercy killings' and assisted suicide ===
Euthanasia involves taking the life of another person, generally for compassionate reasons. It is distinct from assisted suicide, in which one person takes actions that helps another person to voluntarily bring about his or her own death, and distinct from refusal of treatment. Both remain illegal in the United Kingdom. In recent decades, a number of private members' bills have been introduced to parliament in this area, but have not proceeded beyond second reading until the Terminally Ill Adults (End of Life) Bill in 2024, which as of early 2025 is in the committee stage of the House of Commons.

In such cases criminal charges, which may include murder and other unlawful killing charges, depend to some extent on the discretion of the Director of Public Prosecutions and whether a prosecution is deemed "in the public interest". Some discretion determines when a case is worth proceeding with. In 2010, the DPP was forced to publish the guidelines used by the Crown Prosecution Service to determine whether to bring a criminal prosecution in the case of an assisted suicide following a decision by the House of Lords in a case brought by Debbie Purdy, a woman with multiple sclerosis who sought clarity on whether her husband would be prosecuted if he were to assist her in travelling to Switzerland to end her life at Dignitas.

=== Criticism and proposals to amend the law ===
==== Judicial views ====
The case Attorney General's Reference No. 3 of 1994 considered in some depth the legal basis for murder, manslaughter, transferred malice, and the position of an unborn child who dies before or after birth, and as a result of harm to the foetus, mother, or the natural processes of pregnancy. The primary ruling of the case, by Lord Mustill, noted that the foundation and delineation for several rules of law in theory and in historical terms was unsatisfactory, but that the rules themselves were very strongly embedded in the structure of the law and had been considered relatively recently. In particular, "the concept of general malice must be rejected as being long out of date".

==== Reviews and reports ====
In 2004, the Law Commission published an initial report, Partial Defences to Murder. It concluded the law on murder was "a mess"; a full review was announced by the Home Office in October 2004. The terms of reference were published in July 2005, and in 2006 the Law Commission published their second report Murder, Manslaughter and Infanticide which examined the law in these areas. The key recommendations included:

- A three tier classification of homicide, by creating first and second degree murder charges, as well as manslaughter which would be retained. The distinction would be to allow a distinction between intention to kill (mandatory life sentence) and intention to grievously harm with a "serious risk" of death (discretionary life sentence). The second degree case would also include certain cases involving diminished responsibility, provocation or suicide pact. At present all murder convictions are simply described as "murder", argued by critics to attach the same emotive label to great extremes of circumstance.
- Reforms "in relation to complicity in murder, diminished responsibility, provocation and infanticide";
- Consultation on whether and in what way the law should recognise either "an offence of 'mercy' killing or a partial defence of 'mercy' killing".

== Defences ==
=== Complete defences ===
The first words of Coke's definition refer to the defences of insanity (defined in the M'Naghten Rules) and infancy. If any of the general defences such as self-defence apply, an accused will be acquitted of murder. The defence in the 1860 Eastbourne manslaughter case was that the schoolteacher Thomas Hockey was acting under parental authority in using corporal punishment (he was charged with murder but found guilty of manslaughter).

Another defence in medical cases is that of double effect. As was established by Judge Devlin in the 1957 trial of Dr John Bodkin Adams, causing death through the administration of lethal drugs to a patient, if the intention is solely to alleviate pain, is not considered murder.

The defences of duress and necessity are not available to a person charged with murder. The statutory defence of marital coercion, before it was abolished, was not available to a wife charged with murder.

=== Partial defences ===
The following partial defences reduce murder to voluntary manslaughter:

- Loss of control, under sections 54 and 55 of the Coroners and Justice Act 2009.
- Diminished responsibility (Homicide Act 1957, section 2 – as amended)
- Suicide pact, under section 4 of the Homicide Act 1957

Section 1(2) of the Infanticide Act 1938 creates a partial defence which reduces murder to the offence of infanticide under section 1(1) of that Act.

If a partial defence is successful, it will allow the sitting judge full discretion as to the sentence given to the offender; these can range from a conditional discharge to a life sentence (which accounts for around 10 per cent of voluntary manslaughter sentences).

== Proceedings ==
=== Restriction on institution of proceedings ===
Proceedings against a person for murder, if the injury alleged to have caused the death was sustained more than three years before the death occurred, or the person has previously been convicted of an offence committed in circumstances alleged to be connected with the death, may only be instituted by or with the consent of the Attorney General.

=== Indictment ===
A count charging a single principal offender with murder will now be in the following form:

STATEMENT OF OFFENCE.

Murder.

PARTICULARS OF OFFENCE.

A.B., on the ... day of ..., murdered J.S.

The date which is specified in the indictment is the date on which the deceased died, because the offence is not complete until that date.

==== Joinder of counts ====
A count of murder may be joined with a count charging another offence of murder, or a count charging a different offence. A count of conspiracy to murder may be joined with a count of aiding and abetting murder.

In R v Greatrex (David Anthony), Beldam LJ said:

The facts of this case demonstrate how important it is since the decision in the case of Reg. v Powell; Reg. v English (supra) for prosecutors to make sure that an indictment contains alternative offences which carry penalties appropriate for the seriousness of the conduct of those involved.

=== Alternative verdict ===
On the trial of an indictment for murder, the jury cannot return an alternative verdict to the offence charged in that indictment under section 6(3) of the Criminal Law Act 1967, except for the offences listed below:

- Manslaughter
- Causing grievous bodily harm with intent to do so, contrary to section 18 of the Offences against the Person Act 1861
- Any offence of which a person found not guilty of murder may be found guilty under an enactment specifically so providing, namely:
  - Child destruction, contrary to section 1(1) of the Infant Life (Preservation) Act 1929
  - Infanticide, contrary to section 1(1) of the Infanticide Act 1938
  - Aiding, abetting, counselling or procuring suicide or an attempt to commit suicide, contrary to section 2(1) of the Suicide Act 1961
- Any offence of which a person found not guilty of murder may be found guilty under section 4(2) of the Criminal Law Act 1967 (assisting an offender, i.e. doing "any act with intent to impede [the murderer's] apprehension or prosecution", given that the jury believe that the offence (of murder) was committed, though not necessarily by the defendant).
- Attempted murder, or an attempt to commit any other offence of which a person found not guilty of murder may be found guilty, contrary to section 1(1) of the Criminal Attempts Act 1981.

For this purpose each count is considered to be a separate indictment.

=== Mode of trial ===
Murder is an indictable-only offence.

== Sentencing ==
The sentence for murder is, in all cases, mandatory and depends upon the age of the offender at the time of the crime or conviction. Where a person convicted of murder appears to the court to have been aged under eighteen at the time of the offence was committed, the court must sentence the guilty party to be detained during His Majesty’s pleasure. Where a person aged under twenty-one is convicted of murder the court must sentence that person to custody for life. In any other case, a person convicted of murder must be sentenced to imprisonment for life.

Since the abolition of capital punishment, murder has carried a mandatory life sentence in English law. As of 2011 this comprises three elements:

1. A minimum term, often called a "tariff", set by the judge, representing retributive justice without any prospect of parole. This may be appealed by the individual or, if considered unduly lenient, by the Attorney General;
2. Until otherwise decided, continuing incarceration running from the expiry of the minimum term until the parole board considers the person may safely be "released on licence", i.e., upon conditions known as "early release provisions", based upon consideration of the risk posed to the public by the person;
3. At any time the licence may be revoked and the offender recalled to prison until it is considered safe to release him or her again on licence.

=== Tariff system ===
The tariff sets the minimum time that must be spent in prison before an offender can be considered for parole. Following the decision of the European Court of Human Rights in T v UK and the consequent statutory change (enacted as Criminal Justice and Court Services Act 2000 s 60), the judge must indicate in open court the appropriate tariff for an offender aged under 18 who is convicted of murder. The period specified by the judge is a 'sentence', which may, with the leave of the Court of Appeal, be appealed or be the subject of an Attorney General's Reference. Criminal Justice Act 2003 s 271 sets the same rule for adults. The Practice statement (Life sentences for murder) set the tariff for adults, i.e. one aged 18 or over at the time of the offence, with a starting point of 14 years as the minimum term for a case with no aggravating or mitigating factors, and lists the factors which might suggest either a higher or a lower than normal minimum term in an individual case. Mitigating factors include a mental illness, battered woman syndrome, using excessive force in self-defence or mercy killing. Assassination, contract killing, killing to subvert the justice system (such as killing a witness, etc.) are aggravating factors. The statutory guidelines and case law on sentencing are covered in the Crown Prosecution Sentencing Manual.

The trial judge has always been expected to make a recommended minimum term. In 1983 the Home Secretary began amending, usually increasing, the minimum term recommended by the trial judge; this system was declared illegal in 2002 by both the High Court and the European Court of Human Rights following a successful challenge by convicted murderer Anthony Anderson. Anderson had been convicted of a double murder in 1988 and the trial judge recommended that he should serve at least 15 years before being considered for parole, but six years later his tariff was increased to 20 years by Home Secretary Michael Howard. Since then trial judges have been obliged to recommend a minimum term; only the Lord Chief Justice has the power to make any amendments, either through an appeal by the Attorney General to increase a sentence which is seen as unduly lenient, or an appeal by the prisoner to have the minimum term reduced.

Life imprisonment has been the only option that judges have had when sentencing murderers since the death penalty was abolished in 1965. The average prisoner sentenced to life imprisonment spends 14 years behind bars. More serious cases, which included aggravating factors such as a rape or robbery, have led to murderers spending 20 or more years in prison. A few multiple murderers have remained in prison until their deaths; these include Myra Hindley and Ronnie Kray. An estimated 20 prisoners in Britain have been recommended for lifelong imprisonment; these include Mark Hobson, Donald Neilson, Dennis Nilsen, Jeremy Bamber and Steve Wright, Wayne Couzens, see List of prisoners with whole-life orders. Lengthy minimum terms have also been imposed on some killers including 55 years on Hashem Abedi, 40 years on Ian Huntley, 35 years on both Robert Black and Danyal Hussein.

=== Criminal Justice Act 2003 ===
The Criminal Justice Act 2003 changed the law so that instead of the Home Secretary having discretion to modify judicial sentences (which might have been seen as unjustly subject to populism and political considerations), all appeals whether by the subject or by the Attorney General (for "unduly lenient" sentences) are submitted to the Court of Appeal, with the leave of that court, for a ruling. To ensure the right of judges was used reasonably, the Act stipulated standard "starting points", and typical aggravating and mitigating factors. While judges were allowed discretion to set any minimum sentence or "whole life" term, their reasoning for departure from these was to be provided.

The Act also states that in considering an appeal of a minimum term (by any party), the Court of Appeal shall not make any allowance in respect of the (slightly inaccurately described) "double jeopardy" discount, whereby the uncertainty and distress to the respondent prisoner of being sentenced a second time is considered as mitigation.

==== Starting points, post-2003 ====
Under schedule 21 to the Criminal Justice Act 2003 the starting points for murders committed on or after 18 December 2003 are as follows. Where a crime falls into multiple categories, the applicable starting point is the highest:

Whole life starting point (schedule 21, paragraph 4)
A whole life starting point would normally be appropriate for the following "exceptionally high seriousness offences" (or multiple offences committed together and considered as a whole) committed by a person age 21 or over:
- the murder of two or more persons, where each murder involves any of the following-
  - a substantial degree of premeditation or planning,
  - the abduction of the victim, or
  - sexual or sadistic conduct
- the murder of a child if involving the abduction of the child or sexual or sadistic motivation
- the murder of a police officer or prison officer in the course of his duty (on or after 13 April 2015) (this was added by section 27 of the Criminal Justice and Courts Act 2015)
- a murder done for the purpose of advancing a political, religious or ideological cause. (The Counter-Terrorism Act 2008 adds "racial cause" to these, from 16 February 2009)
- a murder by an offender previously convicted of murder
30 year minimum starting point (schedule 21 paragraph 5)
A 30 year starting point would normally be appropriate for the following "particularly high seriousness offences" (or multiple offences committed together and considered as a whole) committed by a person age 18 or over. In Griffiths and others v R (2012) the Court of Appeal said that this list is not exhaustive.
- the murder of a police officer or prison officer in the course of his duty (before 13 April 2015)
- a murder involving the use of a firearm or explosive
- a murder done for gain (in furtherance of robbery or burglary, done for payment or done in the expectation of gain as a result of the death)
- a murder intended to obstruct or interfere with the course of justice
- a murder involving sexual or sadistic conduct
- the murder of two or more persons
- a murder that is racially or religiously aggravated or aggravated by sexual orientation
- a murder normally resulting in a whole life tariff committed by a person aged 18 or over but under 21
25 year minimum starting point (schedule 21 paragraph 5A)
A 25 year starting point was later added (as of 2 March 2010) for the circumstance where a person age 18 or over takes a weapon to "the scene" intending to either commit any offence, or have it available as a weapon, and used that weapon to commit the murder.
15 year minimum (schedule 21 paragraph 6)
Any other murder committed by a person age 18 or over
12 year minimum (schedule 21 paragraph 7)
Any other murder committed by someone under the age of 18

Schedule 21 is due to be replaced by Schedule 21 of the Sentencing Act 2020, but this is only a consolidating statute which does not change the law.

== Related proceedings and crimes ==
=== Coroner verdicts ===
In the case of death arising violently or "unnaturally", suddenly with an unknown cause; or in prison or police custody, there is a duty to hold an inquest (a formal inquiry) to ascertain the identity of the deceased, time and place of death, and method of death (but no further specific allegations). A range of verdicts are possible; cases where murder is a consideration are likely to return a coroner's verdict of unlawful killing, covering all unlawful killings and in particular murder, manslaughter and infanticide. The standard for this ruling is beyond reasonable doubt; failure to meet this standard would usually result in a verdict of accidental death or death by misadventure, or an open verdict where the cause is not known.

Other verdicts possible cover suicide, accident, execution of sentence of death and lawful killing (formerly "justifiable homicide"). The verdict does not name individuals as responsible parties.

=== Civil claims ('wrongful death') ===
Wrongful death is a civil action brought against a person who has wrongfully caused the death of another person. Under the Fatal Accidents Act 1976 a claim may only be brought for the benefit of certain classes of people, mostly close relatives, and usually by the executor or (failing this) any person for whose benefit a claim could have been made. Claims can cover economic loss, grief, and funeral expenses.

Historically under common law, a dead person could not bring a suit, and this created a loophole in which activities that resulted in a person's injury might result in a claim for damages and other remedies, but activities that resulted in a person's death would not. The rapid development of railways in the 1830s led to increasing outcry over the indifferent attitudes of railway companies to railway-related deaths, leading to the Fatal Accidents Act 1846 (later superseded by the Fatal Accidents Act 1976) which gave personal representatives the right to bring a legal action for damages where the deceased person had such a right at the time of their death. Compensation was restricted at the time to the husband, parent, or child of the deceased.

=== Related offences ===
The following inchoate offences relate to the substantive offence of murder:

- Attempted murder
- Soliciting to murder
- Conspiracy to murder

== History ==
Provocation was formerly a partial defence to murder. See also the Statute of Stabbing and the Murder Act 1751.

=== Persons attainted or outlawed of felony ===
Hale said:

The killing of a man attaint of felony, otherwise than in execution of the sentence by a lawful officer lawfully appointed, is murder or manslaughter, as the case happens, and tho there were some doubt, whether the killing of a person outlawed of felony were homicide or no, 2 E. 3. 6. yet it is homicide in both cases. 27 Affiz. 44. Coron. 203.

=== Persons attainted in a praemunire ===
Hale said:

If a man be attaint in a praemunire whereby he is put out of the king's protection, the killing of him was held not to be homicide, 24 H. 8. B. Coron. 197. But the statute of 5 Eliz. cap. 1 hath now put that out of the question, declaring it to be unlawful.

=== Indictment ===
Section 4 of the Criminal Procedure Act 1851 (14 & 15 Vict c 100) provided that in any indictment for murder preferred after the coming into operation of that Act, it was not necessary to set forth the manner in which, or the means by which, the death of the deceased was caused, but it was to be sufficient in every indictment for murder to charge that the defendant "did feloniously, wilfully, and of his malice aforethought, kill and murder the deceased". That Act came into operation on 1 September 1851.

That section was replaced by section 6 of the Offences against the Person Act 1861, which provided that in any indictment for murder, it was not necessary to set forth the manner in which, or the means by which, the death of the deceased was caused, but it was to be sufficient in any indictment for murder to charge that the defendant "did feloniously, wilfully, and of his malice aforethought kill and murder the deceased". That section was repealed by the Indictments Act 1915.

The following specimen count was contained in paragraph 13 of the Second Schedule to the Indictments Act 1915 before it was repealed.

STATEMENT OF OFFENCE.

Murder.

PARTICULARS OF OFFENCE.

A.B., on the day of , in the county of , murdered J.S.

=== Sentence ===
See sections 1 to 3 of the Offences against the Person Act 1861 and Parts II and III of the Homicide Act 1957.

=== Aggravated murder ===
The following former offences were offences of aggravated murder:

- offences of petty treason under the Treason Act 1351
- offences of capital murder under the Homicide Act 1957

== See also ==
- List of murder laws by country
- Scots law on murder
