= DPP v Majewski =

UK legal case

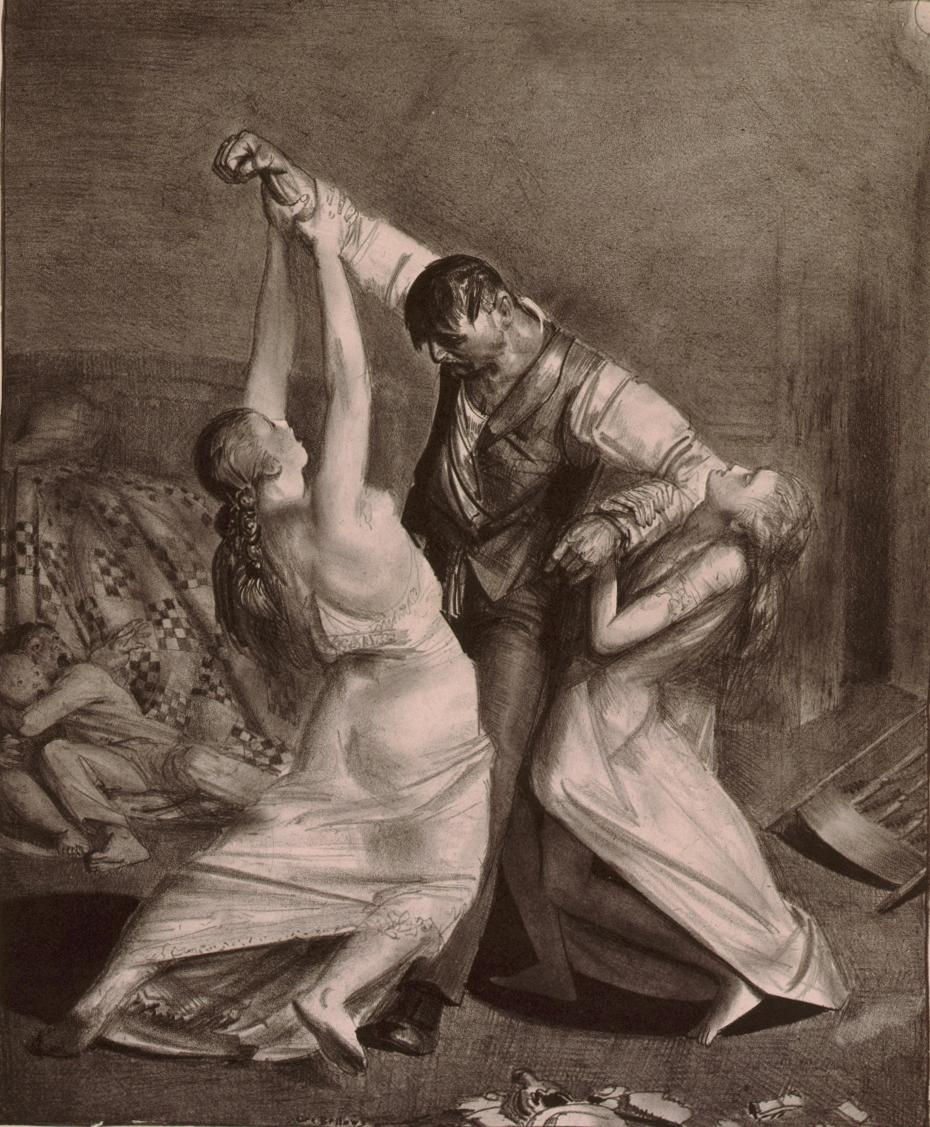
- Court: Judicial Committee of the House of Lords
- Full case name: R v Majewski (Robert Stefan)
- Decided: 13 April 1976
- Citation: [1976] UKHL 2; [1977] AC 443; [1976] 2 WLR 623; [1976] 2 All ER 142; (1976) 62 Cr App R 262; [1976] Crim LR 374; (1976) 120 SJ 299

Case history
- Subsequent action: none

Keywords
- Voluntary intoxication; crime of basic intent; whether substitutes for mens rea

DPP v Majewski [1976] UKHL 2 is a leading English criminal law case, establishing that voluntary intoxication such as by drugs or alcohol is no defence to crimes requiring only basic intent. The mens rea requirement is satisfied by the reckless behaviour of intoxicating oneself.

== Facts ==
The defendant, Robert Stefan Majewski, committed a series of assaults while under the influence of alcohol and drugs (20 pills of Dexedrine and 8 pills of Nembutal). He attacked the landlord and several customers at a public house; subsequently he attacked the police officer who drove him to the police station following his arrest, and a police inspector at the station.

He was charged with four counts of assault occasioning actual bodily harm and three counts of assault on a constable in the execution of his duty.

He tried to rely on his intoxication as a "defence" to the charges.

== Judgment ==
Dismissing his appeal, the highest criminal court held that he could not rely on intoxication, as it is no defence. It was however recognised that certain offences require a mens rea element termed specific intent. The requisite mens rea can be disproved if the defendant can prove that he was so intoxicated as to have not formed the requisite intent.

There is no definite authority or fixed rule on what constitutes a specific intent offence. It is established that murder is but manslaughter is not; there are also specific intent elements in wounding with intent. As a general rule, it can be said that, where recklessness will suffice as mens rea, the crime is one of basic intent. An alternative model is that specific intent is when the mens rea goes beyond the actus reus, i.e. the defendant contemplates consequences beyond their physical actions.

In the instant case, it was held that assault occasioning ABH is a crime of basic intent. Even when too intoxicated to form a specific intent, the Lords held that one can still form basic intent, and thus the defendant's appeal was dismissed.

Even where intoxication can disprove mens rea, this is not the same as a defence (a justification or excuse for committing the offence); rather it is a denial that all the necessary elements to constitute an offence – namely actus reus and simultaneous mens rea – were present.

== See also ==
- English criminal law
- Intoxication in English law
- R v Lipman – an earlier case upholding the principle that the intent to self-intoxicate can be sufficient to a charge of manslaughter, where the risk borne is one which ordinary people would not have taken.
