= Killing of Richard Challen =

2010 crime in Claygate, England

- Date: 14 August 2010
- Location: Claygate, Surrey, England
- Deaths: Richard Challen
- Convicted: Sally Challen

On the morning of 14 August 2010, Richard Challen was killed by his wife Georgina "Sally" Challen (née Jenney) in Claygate, Surrey, England. Sally, 56 at the time, beat the 61-year-old retiree with a hammer 20 times, killing him, after he told her not to question him. She then covered the body and left a note that said, "I love you. Sally." The killing occurred in the kitchen of the couple's marital home. On the following day, Sally travelled to Beachy Head, intending to kill herself. She was intercepted by a chaplain who talked her out of it after three hours of discussion.

She was initially convicted of murder, but the conviction was later quashed on appeal and she pleaded guilty to manslaughter. The case was the subject of the 2019 BBC Two documentary The Case of Sally Challen.

== Background ==
Sally, the youngest of five children, was the daughter of a brigadier in the Royal Engineers who died when she was six years old. She was raised by her mother in Surrey and attended school up to O-levels. She met Richard, a car dealer, when she was 15 years old and they married in 1979. They had two sons, David and James.

== Trial ==
At Guildford Crown Court in Surrey in June 2011, she was convicted of his murder after a seven-day trial, for which she was jailed for life. Coercive control became a criminal offence in 2015. In February 2019 at the Court of Appeal in London, her conviction was quashed and a retrial ordered in light of her having adjustment disorder at the time she killed her husband. Her appeal was based partly on her undiagnosed mental health conditions; she had been treated for bipolar disorder, dependent personality disorder and adjustment disorder while in prison. Sally admitted manslaughter on the grounds of diminished responsibility and pleaded not guilty to murder. She was due to be retried on 1 July 2019. However, on 7 June 2019 at the Old Bailey in London, her plea was accepted and the retrial cancelled. The judge said that Challen controlled, isolated and humiliated his wife and was frequently unfaithful to her. He sentenced her to nine years and four months' imprisonment, which she had already served.

Sally's son David supported her and fought for her in the media; he felt the murder could have been prevented. He subsequently wrote a book, The Unthinkable, about the effect of coercive control.

In May 2020, Judge Paul Matthews, sitting in the High Court in Bristol, ruled that Sally could inherit the estate of the deceased Challen, which is valued at £1 million.
