= R v Lipman =

English criminal law case

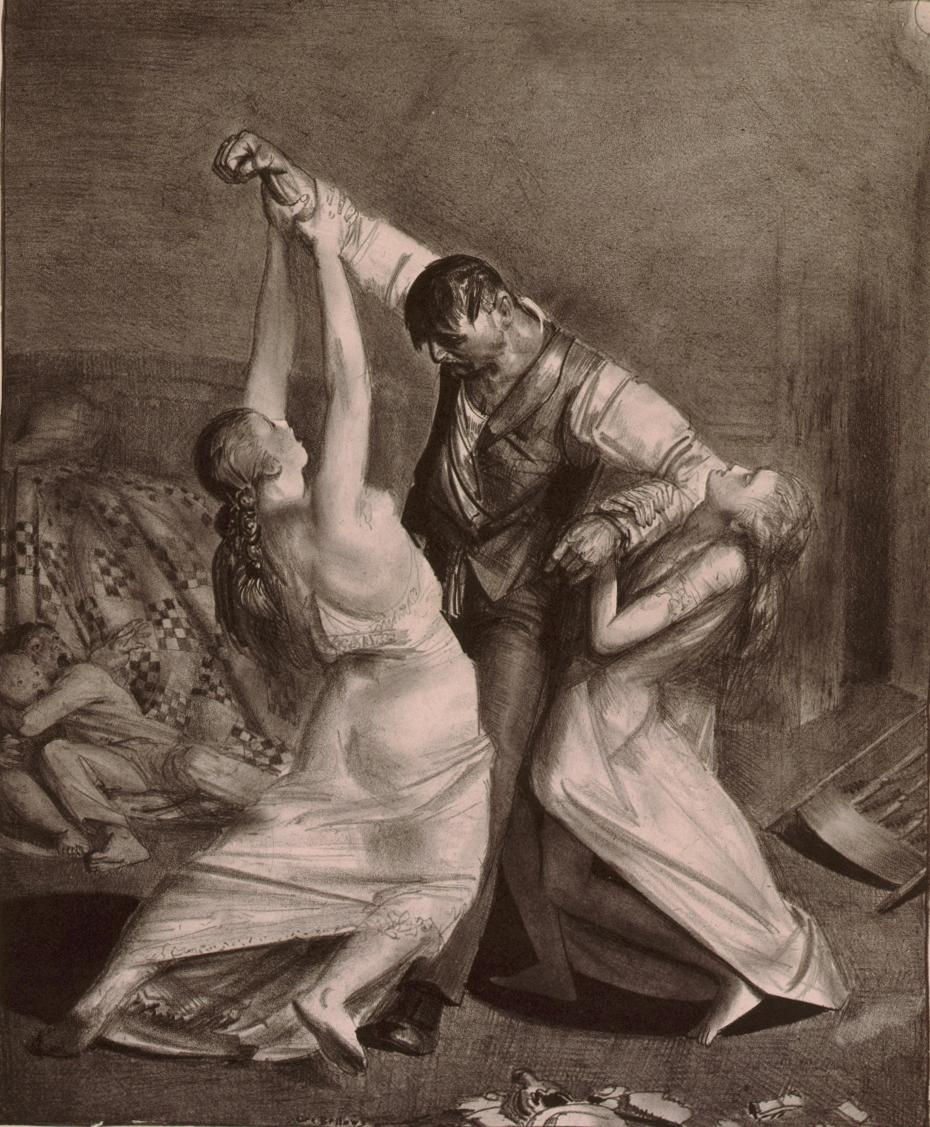
- Court: Court of Appeal
- Full case name: R v Lipman (Robert)
- Decided: 29 July 1969
- Citation: [1970] 1 QB 152; [1969] 3 WLR 819; [1969] 3 All ER 410; (1969) 53 Cr App R 600; (1969) 133 JP 712; (1969) 113 SJ 670

Case history
- Subsequent action: none

Case opinions
- Self-induced (voluntary) intoxication, however extreme, is no defence to manslaughter, provided a loss of control is foreseen by becoming intoxicated.

Keywords
- Voluntary intoxication; manslaughter; whether specific intent/recklessness excused by intoxication

R v Lipman [1970] 1 QB 152 is an English criminal law precedent that self-induced (voluntary) intoxication, however extreme, is no defence to manslaughter, provided a loss of control is foreseen by becoming intoxicated. The defendant in voluntarily taking dangerous drugs was found to have taken a dangerous risk which ordinary individuals would foresee, with his lack of intention to carry out dangerous acts not thereafter being relevant to a conviction of manslaughter.

== Facts ==
The defendant and the victim, who were both alleged to be addicted to drugs, both took a quantity of LSD late on 16 September 1967. On the morning of the 18th he booked out of his hotel and left the country, before the victim was found the next day with haemorrhaging of the brain, and evidence of asphyxiation. The defendant was returned by extradition, then attested that he and the victim had experienced hallucinations from taking LSD. By his account, he imagined he had been attacked by snakes, resulting in his assault on the victim. The jury accepted that he had no intention to murder or commit grievous bodily harm, but nevertheless convicted him of manslaughter, on the direction of the judge that it would suffice for the prosecution to prove:

"He must have realised before he got himself into the condition he did by taking the drugs that acts such as those he subsequently performed and which resulted in the death were dangerous."

The defendant appealed, alleging the judge should have directed the jury to convict only if the prosecution could prove he had the requisite intention to carry out acts which were likely to result in harm.

== Judgment ==
It was submitted on behalf of the defendant that the decision of R v Church placed a burden on the prosecution to show that the defendant had, by ruling out all other reasonable explanations for the action(s), intended the consequences of his actions. Widgery LJ held that this was not the case, stating that:

All that the judgment in Church's case says in terms is that whereas, formerly, a killing by any unlawful act amounted to manslaughter, this consequence does not now inexorably follow unless the unlawful act is one in which ordinary sober and responsible people would recognise the existence of risk.

Accordingly, since the jury had concluded that the defendant's actions had created a dangerous risk that ordinary people would foresee, it was immaterial that the defendant did not have any specific intent to carry out the actions. The appeal was therefore dismissed, and the sentence of six years upheld.

== See also ==
- English criminal law
- Intoxication in English law
- DPP v Majewski
