= R v Jordan =

1956 English medical negligence court case

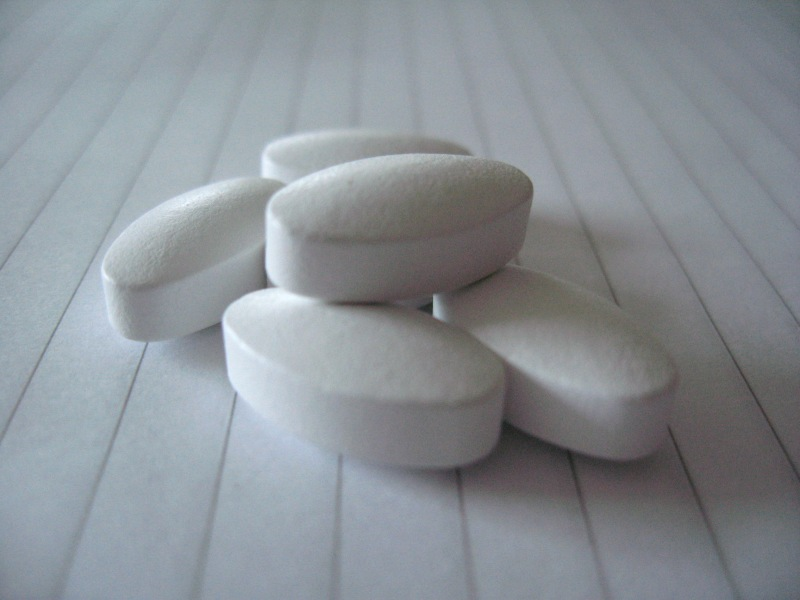
- Court: Court of Appeal
- Full case name: R v Jordan (James Clinton)
- Decided: 1 January 1956
- Citation: (1956) 40 Cr App R 152

Case history
- Subsequent action: none

Keywords
- Novus actus interveniens (breaking the chain); causation; homicide; non-fatal injury; self-healing injury; unusually bad medical negligence

R v Jordan (1956) 40 Cr App R 152 was an English criminal law case that has been distinguished by two later key cases of equal precedent rank for its ruling that some situations of medical negligence following a wounding are those of breaking the chain of causation (across much of Europe termed a novus actus interveniens), capable of absolving a person who has inflicted bodily harm of guilt for an offence of the severity resulting from a consequent decline in bodily condition, in particular, homicide. The facts were ones whereby a wound was should to be almost certain, with no treatment, to heal itself. The medical attempt to facilitate recovery from the wound resulted in a non-prosecutable death as it was shown to have been negligent and principally an antibiotic error though far from unknown and well-intentioned. The appropriate charge(s) would be ones relating to wounding or disorder of the defendant, rather than homicide which could not have been said to have been caused by the defendant in any meaningful way.

== Facts ==
The appellant and three others – all serving members of the United States Airforce – became involved in a disturbance at a café in Hull, with the appellant stabbing a man, Beaumont, then admitted to hospital.

The defence team conceded their client stabbed Beaumont; they then uncovered medical evidence not available at trial and appealed on the grounds that the medical treatment the victim had received was so negligent as to break the appellant's liability.

== Judgment ==
Ordinarily, the circumstances and medical treatment following serious bodily harm are not relevant in establishing a defendant's liability for his acts. Where the original wound or injury caused by the defendant is still an 'operating cause' of death, negligent medical treatment will not constitute a novus actus interveniens. (Note: This remains a possible defence/appeal ground per R v Smith (Thomas Joseph) [1959] 2 QB 35, where at pages 42-43, it is stated that: "It seems to the court that if at the time of death the original wound is still an operating cause and a substantial cause, then the death can properly be said to be the result of the wound, albeit that some other cause of death is also operating.")

However, in the judgment of Hallett J, acting as a judge of the Court of Appeal, it was conceded that the death of the victim was not "consequent upon the wound inflicted." Hallett summed up the fresh medical evidence as such:

The stab wound had penetrated the intestine in two places, but it was mainly healed at the time of death. With a view to preventing infection it was thought right to administer an antibiotic, terramycin. It was agreed by the two additional witnesses that, that was the proper course to take, and a proper dose was administered. Some people, however, are intolerant to terramycin, and Beaumont was one of those people. After the initial doses he developed diarrhoea, which was only properly attributable, in the opinion of those doctors, to the fact that the patient was intolerant to terramycin. Thereupon the administration of terramycin was stopped, but unfortunately the very next day the resumption of such administration was ordered by another doctor and it was recommenced the following day. The two doctors both take the same view about it. Dr. Simpson said that to introduce a poisonous substance after the intolerance of the patient was shown was palpably wrong. Mr. Blackburn agreed.

The Court took the view that based on these facts – and that the original stab wound had healed – a reasonable jury would not be satisfied that the defendant's acts had been the material cause of the victim's death. As such, the conviction was quashed.

The defendant was not liable because the original wound's healing was quite well-advanced and set to heal with negligible risk of death, then further medical treatment was 'palpably wrong' thus breaking the link between the defendant's act and the victim's death.

== See also ==
- R v Smith (Thomas Joseph)
- R v Cheshire

== Notes and references ==
Footnotes

Citations
