= Going Dutch =

Term for sharing payment

'Going Dutch' (sometimes written with lower-case 'dutch') is a term that indicates that each person participating in a paid activity covers their own expenses, rather than any one person in the group defraying the cost for the entire group. The term stems from restaurant dining etiquette in the Western world, where each person pays for their meal. It is also called Dutch date, Dutch treat (the oldest form, a pejorative), and doing Dutch.

A derivative is 'sharing Dutch', having a joint ownership of luxury goods. For example: four people share the ownership of a plane, boat, car, or any other sharable high-end product. This in order to minimize cost, sharing the same passion for that particular product and to have the maximum usage of this product.

== Etymology ==
The Oxford English Dictionary connects 'go Dutch' / 'Dutch treat' to other phrases which have 'an opprobrious or derisive application, largely due to the rivalry and enmity between the English and Dutch in the 17th century', the period of the Anglo-Dutch Wars. Another example is 'Dutch courage'. A term bearing some similarities is Dutch oven.

== Practices ==
=== Africa ===
In Egypt, 'going Dutch' is called 'Englizy', meaning 'English-style', and traditionally is considered rude.

=== Americas ===
In the United States, the practice of going Dutch is often related to specific situations or events. During meals such as birthdays, first dates or company business lunches, an expectation develops based on social traditions, personal income, and the strength of relationship between the parties. The increase in prevalence for mobile sharing payment platforms such as Venmo or Zelle has resulted in a cultural rethinking of meal payments.

==== Latin America ====
Some Hispanic American countries use the Spanish phrase 'pagar a la americana', which means 'to pay American-style'.

In Chile and Uruguay, 'hacer una vaca' is a system equivalent to going Dutch, it is translated as 'to make a cow'. A person is designated as the one who pays, or the 'bank' (the one who collects the money) and is reimbursed by the others. This system is used either when planning things to buy for a party, or when paying the bill in a restaurant.

In Panama, 'mita (or 'miti') y mita', means 'half and half'. It refers to both going Dutch and splitting the check equally.

In Guatemala, a sing-song phrase is used to refer to 'going Dutch': 'A la ley de Cristo, cada quien con su pisto', which is translated to 'By the law of Christ, each one with his own stew'. Pisto is a stewed dish similar to ratatouille, and is used in this phrase as a stand-in for food in general.

In Honduras, the phrase used is similar to that in Guatemala: 'Como dijo Cristo, cada quien con su pisto', which is translated to 'As Christ said, everyone with their own stew'. In this case, pisto is instead commonly used to denote money, rather than stew itself.

In El Salvador, a rhyming phrase is used to refer to 'going Dutch': 'Ley de Esparta: cada quien paga lo que se harta', which is translated to 'Spartan law: each pays [for] what they eat'.

In Costa Rica, 'ir con Cuyo' is a system to determine who pays, it is translated as 'to go with Cuyo' ('Cuyo' is a placeholder name, similar to 'John Doe' in English). If one of the diners asks 'Quien es Cuyo?' ('Who is Cuyo?'), another may either respond that they will cover the bill, or may suggest to 'cada uno con lo suyo' ('each with his own'), meaning to each person should pay for what they ate.

In Brazil, 'rachar' is a slang word used for the same purpose, or for when it is too expensive, the group would split the bill equally.

In Mexico, 'going Dutch' is called '[evento] de traje', which translates to 'a white-tie event', it is used in the context where all participants are expected to contribute, either monetarily or in kind. It is derived from the homonyms traje (a conjugation of the verb traer meaning 'I brought') and traje ('suit').

=== Asia ===
==== East Asia ====
In Japan, 'going Dutch' is called warikan (割勘), meaning to split the bill.

In North Korea, where rigid social systems are still in place, it is most common for the person of the highest social standing, such as a boss or an elder figure, to pay the bill. This not only applies in a 1 to 1 situation but also in groups. Among the younger generation, it is quite common for friends to alternate when paying the bill, or for one to pay for dinner and another to pay for drinks.

In South Korea, 'going Dutch' is called 더치페이, meaning 'Dutch pay'. It is a Konglish loan phrase. For romantic dates, men usually pay.

In Mainland China, after a group meal, it is expected that the bill be paid by the person who has highest social standing or highest income, or by the person who made the invitation. A group of friends or colleagues who dine together regularly will often take turns paying the bill. Men often pay for the initial romantic dates, however after several dates, it is common for women to take a turn at paying for dates. It is common for groups of strangers or sometimes younger generations to split the bill; payment platforms and super-apps WeChat Pay and Alipay have a built-in feature for going Dutch.

In Hong Kong, 'going Dutch' is called 'AA制', which translates to 'AA system', or simply, 'AA'. 'AA' may stand for 'algebraic average', 'arithmetic average', 'all average', 'all apart', or 'acting appointment'.

==== South Asia ====
In Afghanistan, 'bandar' means 'group food but contribution from all participants'. The phrase 'going Dutch' is common amongst the younger generation such as students. Going Dutch is considered negative in family meetings.

In Pakistan, 'going Dutch' is sometimes called 'American system'. The practice is more prevalent among youngsters, friends, colleagues and some family members to request separate bills. In Urdu, it is called 'apna apna', meaning 'each his own'. In a group, 'going Dutch' usually means to split the bill equally instead.

In Bangladesh, 'going Dutch' is often called 'je je, jar jar' (যে যে,যার যার), meaning 'his his, whose whose'.

In Nepal, 'going Dutch' is sometimes called 'aafno aafno', which means 'yours, yours'. Young people may also use English phrases such as 'going together, paying separate'.

===== India =====
In India, various regional languages have their own translations for 'going Dutch': In Hindi, it is called 'TTMM' for 'tu tera mein mera'; In Bengali, it is called 'je jaar shey taar'; In Marathi, it is called 'tujhe tu majhe mi'; In Kannada, it is called 'neenu nindu koodu' or 'nanu nandu kodthini'; In Telugu, it called 'EDVD', which stands for 'evadi dabbulu vaadi dabbule'; In Malayalam, it is called 'thantrathuI' or 'thaan'. All of them generally translate to 'you pay yours and I pay mine', though in practice it refers to splitting the bill equally instead. Since the concept of freely dating is relatively new in India, a country with a long cultural history of arranged marriage, going Dutch is primarily not applied to dating but to outings among friends and colleagues. When the expression 'going Dutch' is used, it often means to split the bill equally instead.

==== Southeast Asia ====
In Indonesia, it is called 'BSS' or 'BMM', which stands for 'bayar sendiri-sendiri' and 'bayar masing-masing', both meaning 'pay for yourself'. This term is most commonly used in informal settings, such as among friends. In a more formal setting the commonly accepted convention is that the person of higher social status pays. Among equal members of group it is considered polite to offer payments for all the meals and drinks, and the other party has the opportunity to refuse.

In the Philippines, 'going Dutch' is called 'KKB', which stands for 'kanya-kanyang bayad' which means 'pay for your own self'. Going Dutch is generally the norm among friends or people of similar financial standing. It is general practice to have the man pay especially during courtship or when in romantic relationships.

In Thailand, it is called อเมริกันแชร์, meaning 'American share'. Less commonly, it has also been referred to as 'soldier pay'.

==== West Asia ====
In many West Asian cultures, asking to go Dutch is seen as rude. Traditions of hospitality play a great part in determining who pays, therefore an invitation will be given only when the host feels that they are able to afford the expenses of all. Similarly, gender roles and age play a more important role than they would in Western societies.

In Iraq, 'going Dutch' is called 'Maṣlawiya' (مصلاوية), referring to the people of Mosul, who are supposedly stingy.

In Levantine Arab countries, 'going Dutch' is called is 'shamia' (شامية), referring to the people of Damascus in Syria, who are supposedly stingy. A similar expression is 'sherke halabieh' (meaning 'sharing the Aleppo way'), bearing a similar connotation.

In Turkey, 'going Dutch' is called hesabı Alman usulü ödemek, which means 'to pay the bill the German way'; to phrase may be shortened to 'Alman usûlü', meaning 'German-style'.

In Iran, 'dongi' (دنگی), means to split the bill equally. It is used usually among close friends and the young when they are not invited by a specific host. Otherwise, the host will not allow anybody to pay, according to Persian hospitality norms. The practice has become quite common in Iran.

=== Europe ===
In Southern Europe, it is rather uncommon for most locals to have separate bills, and is sometimes even regarded as rude, especially when in larger groups. In urban areas or places frequented by tourists, this has changed over the last decades.

In the Nordic countries and the Netherlands, going Dutch is the norm for almost every visit to a restaurant, with larger groups being the exception, especially on more formal occasions. Though the Scandinavian countries are some of the most gender-equal countries in the world, it is still common and mostly expected for men (in a heterosexual context) to pay on romantic dates. One exception to this norm is in the case of a woman asking a man out, where it would be considered polite for the woman to pay the bill. In Sweden, If a date is over fika, people usually go Dutch, because of the usually smaller price tag.

In Italy, 'pagare alla romana', meaning 'to pay as the Romans [do]' or 'to pay Roman-style', means to split the bill equally.

In Greece, it is called 'refené'.

In Catalonia, going Dutch is the rule among Catalans.

In France, 'faire moitié-moitié' (colloquially 'faire moit'-moit''), literally 'make half-[and]-half', means to split the bill equally. For romantic dates, the traditional practice is that the man pays. In a business meeting, the hosting party usually pays for all – it is considered rude not to do so.

In Portugal, 'going Dutch' is called 'contas à moda' do Porto meaning 'Porto-style bills'. 'A meias' means to split the bill equally.
