= Guildford Crown Court =

Court building in Guidford, England

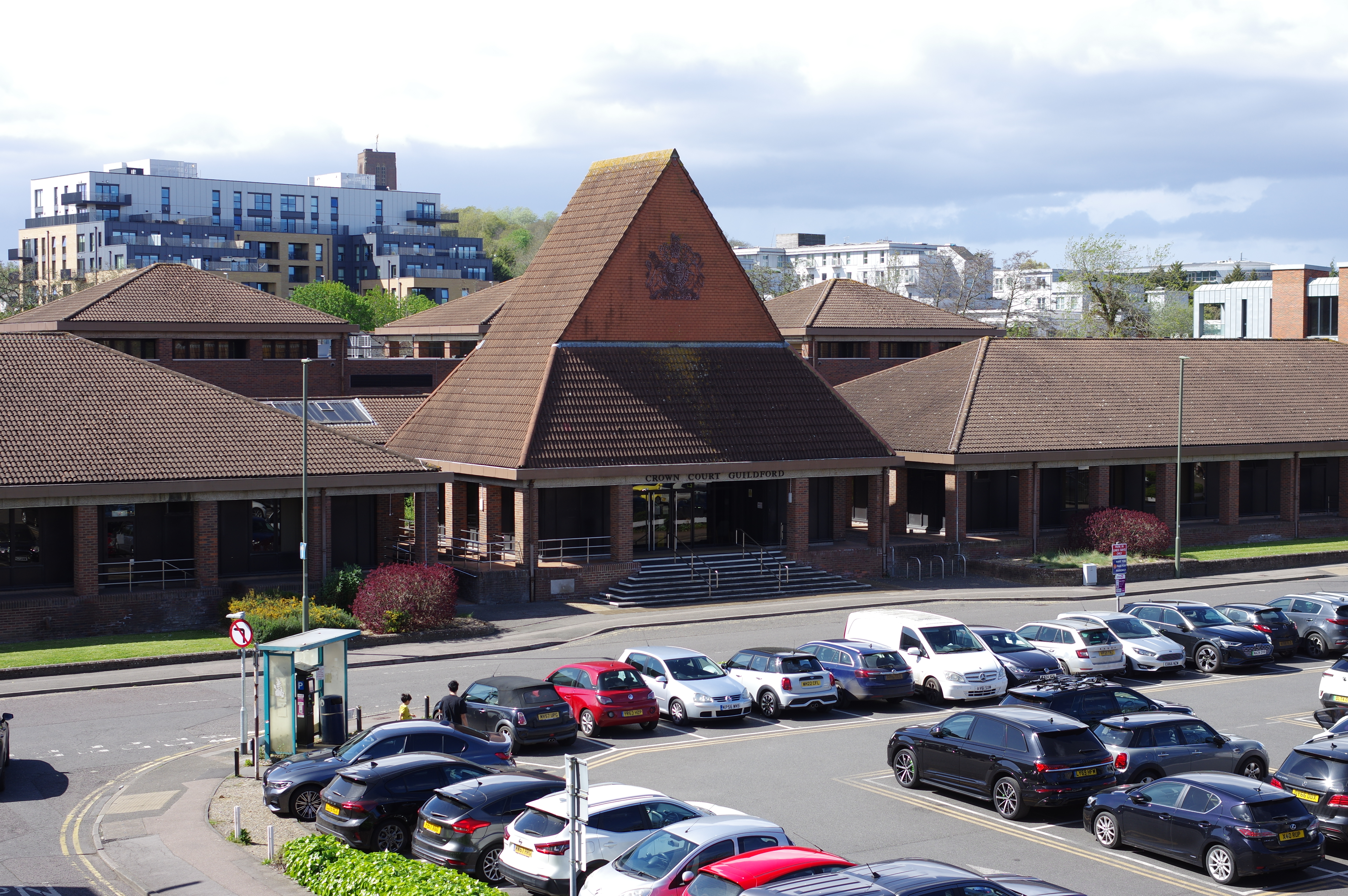
- Guildford Crown Court

- Shown in Surrey
- 51.2389°N 0.5790°W
- Location: Bedford Road, Guildford

History
- Built: 1986

Site notes
- Architect: Property Services Agency
- Architectural style: Modernist style

Guildford Crown Court is a Crown Court venue which deals with criminal cases in Bedford Road, Guildford, England.

== History ==
King Henry III designated Guildford as a location for the Surrey County Court and assizes in August 1257. A corn exchange and assizes hall, which became known as Tunsgate, was erected in the High Street in 1818. However, by 1860, it was found to be "grossly inadequate".

The assizes then moved to the County Hall in North Street: that building, which had been commissioned as a mechanics' institute in 1845, was considerably altered and extended for public and judicial use to a design by Thomas Goodchild in 1862. It was badly damaged in a fire in 1963 and was subsequently demolished. As the number of court cases in Guildford grew, it became necessary to commission a modern courthouse. This issue was temporarily resolved when a new law courts building (now referred to as Guildford Magistrates' and County Court) was opened in Mary Road in May 1976.

However, what the borough still needed was a courthouse with dedicated facilities for Crown Court hearings, which require courtrooms suitable for trial by jury. The site selected by the Lord Chancellor's Department, on the west side of Bedford Road, had been occupied by a cricket ground and a gas works.

The new building was designed by the Property Services Agency in the Modernist style, built in red brick at a cost of £4.7 million, and was completed in 1986. The design involved a symmetrical main frontage of 23 bays facing onto Bedford Road. The central section of three bays featured a short flight of steps leading up to an opening with two glass doors. Above the opening, there was a pitched roof surmounted by a triangular pediment bearing a Royal coat of arms. The whole structure, including the wings of ten bays each, was single storey and fronted by a prominent colonnade, formed by square columns supporting an entablature. Internally, the building was laid out to accommodate four courtrooms.

Notable cases have included the trial and conviction of Sally Challen, in June 2011, for the murder of her husband, Richard Challen; her plea to have the conviction reduced to manslaughter was accepted by a judge at the Old Bailey in June 2019.
