= Law Reform (Year and a Day Rule) Act 1996 =

Act of the Parliament of the United Kingdom

Law Reform (Year and a Day Rule) Act 1996 (Note: Section 3(1).)
- Act of Parliament
- Parliament of the United Kingdom
- Long title: An Act to abolish the "year and a day rule" and, in consequence of its abolition, to impose a restriction on the institution in certain circumstances of proceedings for a fatal offence.
- Citation: 1996 c. 19
- Territorial extent: England and Wales; Northern Ireland; (Note: Section 3(4).)

Dates
- Royal assent: 17 June 1996
- Commencement: 17 June 1996 (except section 2) (Note: Section 3(2).); 17 August 1996 (section 2) (Note: Section 3(3).)
Other legislation
Amended by	Domestic Violence, Crime and Victims Act 2004; Coroners and Justice Act 2009; Domestic Violence, Crime and Victims (Amendment) Act 2012; Justice Act (Northern Ireland) 2015

Status: Amended

Text of statute as originally enacted

Revised text of statute as amended

Text of the Law Reform (Year and a Day Rule) Act 1996 as in force today (including any amendments) within the United Kingdom, from legislation.gov.uk.

The Law Reform (Year and a Day Rule) Act 1996 (c. 19) is an act of the Parliament of the United Kingdom which abolished the year and a day rule in English law and Northern Irish law.

== Background ==
The year and a day rule was an ancient rule of the common law which created a conclusive presumption that a death was not murder (or any other form of homicide) if it occurred more than a year and a day since the act (or omission) that was alleged to have been its cause. The rule appeared in Edward Coke's definition of murder.

The precise scope of the rule was unclear. As Lord Dormand said on second reading in the House of Lords, "it certainly applies to murder, manslaughter, infanticide and aiding and abetting suicide. It may also apply to motoring offences in which death is an element: causing death by dangerous driving; causing death by reckless driving while under the influence of drink or drugs; and aggravated vehicle taking causing death."

== Passage ==
The act started as a private member's bill introduced by Doug Hoyle MP, who came 16th in the ballot in the 1995/6 Parliamentary session. The act received royal assent on 17 June 1996, and the abolition of the year and a day rule came into effect for acts (or omissions) leading to death on that day.

== Provisions ==
The act has only three sections. Section 1 simply says:

The rule known as the "year and a day rule" (that is, the rule that, for the purposes of offences involving death and of suicide, an act or omission is conclusively presumed not to have caused a person's death if more than a year and a day elapsed before he died) is abolished for all purposes.

The remaining two sections provide that a prosecution where a death occurs more than three years after an injury, or where the accused was previously convicted of an offence committed in circumstances connected with the death (for example, a previous conviction for grievous bodily harm), can be instituted only with the consent of the Attorney General.
