= Rogers v. Tennessee =

- Supreme Court of the United States

Argued November 1, 2000 Decided May 14, 2001
- Full case name: Wilbert K. Rogers, Petitioner v. Tennessee
- Citations: 532 U.S. 451 (more) 121 S. Ct. 1693; 149 L. Ed. 2d 697; 2001 U.S. LEXIS 3519; 69 U.S.L.W. 4307; 2001 Cal. Daily Op. Service 3828; 2001 Daily Journal DAR 4681; 2001 Colo. J. C.A.R. 2418; 14 Fla. L. Weekly Fed. S 229

Case history
- Prior: Conviction affirmed by the Tennessee Supreme Court, 992 S.W.2d 393 (Tenn. 1999); cert. granted, 529 U.S. 1129 (2000)

Holding
- The Supreme Court of Tennessee's decision to overturn the year and a day rule and convict the defendant was not a violation of either the Ex Post Facto clause or of due process principles.

Court membership
- Chief Justice William Rehnquist Associate Justices John P. Stevens · Sandra Day O'Connor; Antonin Scalia · Anthony Kennedy; David Souter · Clarence Thomas; Ruth Bader Ginsburg · Stephen Breyer

Case opinions
- Majority: O'Connor, joined by Rehnquist, Kennedy, Souter, Ginsburg
- Dissent: Stevens
- Dissent: Scalia, joined by Stevens, Thomas; Breyer (in part)
- Dissent: Breyer

Laws applied
- U.S. Const., Art. I, Sec. 10, Amend. XIV

Rogers v. Tennessee, 532 U.S. 451 (2001), was a U.S. Supreme Court case holding that there is no due process violation for lack of fair warning when pre-existing common law limitations on what acts constitute a crime, under a more broadly worded statutory criminal law, are broadened to include additional acts, even when there is no notice to the defendant that the court might undo the common law limitations, so long as the statutory criminal law was made prior to the acts, and so long as the expansion to the newly included acts is expected or defensible in reference to the statutory law. The court wrote,

In the context of common law doctrines... Strict application of ex post facto principles... would unduly impair the incremental and reasoned development of precedent that is the foundation of the common law system." The decision did not affect the requirement of fair warning placed on statutes passed by legislatures - "The Constitution's Ex Post Facto Clause... 'is a limitation upon the powers of the Legislature, and does not of its own force apply to the Judicial Branch of government'... a judicial alteration of a common law doctrine of criminal law [only] violates the principal of fair warning... where it is 'unexpected and indefensible by reference to the law which had been expressed prior to the conduct in issue.

The case was about a murderer, Wilbert Rogers, who stabbed his victim in the heart, causing the victim to have cardiac arrest and lapse into a coma. The victim was kept alive for fifteen months using modern medical methods. An ancient common law was that if a victim of a crime died more than a year after a criminal act, that act was not considered to be murder, under a justification that medical science was not capable of establishing causation so far beyond the criminal act, whereby there was reasonable doubt as to the cause of death. This was known as the year and a day rule. The rule dated from as far back as the 12th century, and most modern courts that examined the rule found it to be obsolete given modern medical scientific advances. The court wrote,

At common law, the year and a day rule provided that no defendant could be convicted of murder unless his victim died by defendant's act within a year and a day of the act... The Supreme Court of Tennessee... had recognized the... rule... 'was part of the common law [in 1907]... however [in the underlying case involving Rogers], the court found that the original reasons for recognizing the rule no longer exist [at the time of the Rogers homicide].

The Tennessee Supreme Court abolished the rule in the Rogers homicide case, without Rogers having any notice that the rule change would occur. The US Supreme Court held that the Tennessee Supreme Court's abolition of the common-law year and a day rule could apply retroactively to crimes committed before the court abolished the rule under the Due Process Clause of the United States Constitution, so long as there was a statutory criminal law passed prior to the criminal act, and the change in common law interpretation of the statutory law was either expected or defensible in reference to that statutory law. Accordingly, the defendant's conviction for murder was sustained on appeal despite the fact that the victim died 15 months after the defendant struck the ultimately fatal blow.

== Facts ==
Rogers stabbed James Bowdery with a butcher knife on May 6, 1994. One of the stab wounds penetrated Bowdery's heart, and during surgery to repair the wound, Bowdery went into cardiac arrest. Bowdery survived, but due to cerebral hypoxia Bowdery slipped into a coma. Eventually Bowdery developed a kidney infection, from which he died on August 7, 1995, 15 months after the stabbing. The medical examiner ruled the cause of death as cerebral hypoxia "secondary to a stab wound to the heart."

Rogers was convicted of second-degree murder under Tennessee's homicide statute, which does not include the year and a day rule. Rogers appealed to the Tennessee Court of Criminal Appeals, arguing that the year-and-a-day rule was part of the common law of Tennessee, despite its absence from the Tennessee homicide statute. The appellate court disagreed, noting that the state's Criminal Sentencing Reform Act had abolished all common-law defenses in criminal cases, including the year-and-a-day rule.

Rogers appealed again to the Tennessee Supreme Court. The court held that the common-law year-and-a-day rule survived in Tennessee, but was outmoded. It therefore abolished the rule. Rogers had also argued that abolishing the rule after he had committed his crime would violate the Ex Post Facto Clause of Article I of the U.S. Constitution. The Tennessee Supreme Court disagreed, reasoning that although judicial decisions can be ex post facto laws, retroactive abolition in this case would not offend due process principles because the year-and-a-day rule was so outmoded that a reasonable person would not expect it to exist under modern law. The U.S. Supreme Court agreed to hear the case at Rogers's request.

== Majority opinion ==
The Court evaluated this case under the rubric of due process rather than the limitations on ex post facto lawmaking present in the Constitution. This is so because the Ex Post Facto Clause limits only legislative actions rather than judicial decisions. However, limitations on ex post facto judicial decisionmaking are inherent in the notions of due process. For instance, in Bouie v. City of Columbia, 378 U.S. 347 (1964), the Court had held that due process forbade applying a novel interpretation of South Carolina's criminal trespassing statute to a criminal defendant who had no prior warning that the statute might be interpreted in a manner adverse to the defendant.

Bouie and subsequent cases applying Bouie made clear that the Due Process Clause of the Fourteenth Amendment did not incorporate the Ex Post Facto guarantee against the states in any particular manner. The rationale of Bouie rested on "core due process concepts of notice, foreseeability, and, in particular, the right to fair warning as those concepts bear on the constitutionality of attaching criminal penalties to what previously had been innocent conduct." Although the set of interests protected by the Due Process Clause might overlap substantially with the set of interests protected by the Ex Post Facto Clauses, to elide the distinction between the two provisions as set forth in Bouie would be to ignore the textual differences between the clauses as well as the contextual differences between legislative and judicial lawmaking. Put another way, imposing a strict prohibition against ex post facto lawmaking on common law courts would deprive such courts of the ability to interpret the law in a manner consistent with settled expectations of parties before it who live in the modern world.

Common law courts at the time of the framing undoubtedly believed that they were finding rather than making law. But, however one characterizes their actions, the fact of the matter is that common law courts then, as now, were deciding cases, and in doing so were fashioning and refining the law as it then existed in light of reason and experience. Due process clearly did not prohibit this process of judicial evolution at the time of the framing, and it does not do so today.

Rogers should have anticipated that the year-and-a-day rule might no longer exist under modern circumstances. Thirteenth century medical science was not capable of determining the cause of death beyond a reasonable doubt after a significant amount of time had elapsed following the ultimately fatal blow. For this reason, the year-and-a-day rule served as a kind of limitation period on murder prosecutions. However, as medical science has advanced, forensic scientists have been able to determine the cause of a person's death later and later after the fatal event occurs. "For this reason, the year and a day rule has been legislatively or judicially abolished in the vast majority of jurisdictions recently to have addressed the issue," as the Tennessee Supreme Court observed. This pervasive change in the law should have put Rogers on notice that, although the rule had not been formally abolished in Tennessee, it was clearly moribund in 1994 in American law generally and Tennessee law specifically. Accordingly, it was hardly unexpected and indefensible for the Tennessee Supreme Court, while considering an appeal from Rogers's own conviction, to first formally abolish the rule and then to apply that decision retroactively to his own case.

== Dissenting opinion ==
Applying his originalist understanding of the Ex Post Facto Clause, Justice Scalia concluded that the Tennessee Supreme Court's retroactive application of its decision to remove the year-and-a-day rule from its jurisprudence rendered Rogers's conviction for murder invalid. Scalia began with a different premise than the majority—that the Tennessee Supreme Court had changed that state's law of murder when it abolished the year-and-a-day rule in Rogers's case. If the legislature had abolished the rule, the Ex Post Facto Clause would not allow that abolishment to apply to Rogers's case. Why should the fact that it was the state supreme court that abolished the rule make a difference? The process of lawmaking by common-law courts—applying legal principles to novel fact situations—is not interrupted by forbidding them from applying new legal principles to new factual situations, after all. Scalia thus believed that there was no reason not to apply the Ex Post Facto Clause to "unelected judges" just as it applied to the "elected representatives of all the people."

What occurred in the present case, then, is precisely what Blackstone said—and the Framers believed—would not suffice [as a rationale of decision by a common-law court]. The Tennessee Supreme Court made no pretense that the year-and-a-day rule was 'bad' from the outset; rather, it asserted the need for the rule, as a means of assuring causality of the death, had disappeared with time. Blackstone—and the Framers who were formed by Blackstone—would clearly have regarded that change in law as a matter for the legislature, beyond the power of the court.... That explains why the Constitution restricted only the legislature from enacting ex post facto laws. Under accepted norms of judicial process [that prevailed in the time of the Framers], an ex post facto law... was simply not an option for the courts.

For these historical reasons, Scalia believed, the majority should not have circumvented the strictures of the Ex Post Facto Clause by analyzing what the Tennessee Supreme Court had done under the rubric of due process. "I find it impossible to believe, as the Court does, that this strong sentiment [against ex post facto lawmaking] attached only to retroactive laws passed by the legislature, and would not apply equally to a court's production of the same result through disregard of the traditional limits on judicial power."

Scalia also disagreed with the conclusion that Rogers had had fair warning that the year-and-a-day rule was so moribund as to have been effectively abolished. Other common-law crimes had outmoded elements, and certainly a common-law court could not say those elements no longer existed because the ancient rationale for them had changed—asportation, as an element of common-law larceny, or "breaking the close" as an element of burglary, for instance. (Of course, today this behavior would be subject to punishment under statutory definitions of crimes rather than common-law definitions.) Rogers might have known that the rule was outmoded, but he could not have known that the rule had ceased to exist until the court or the legislature told him so. And although the rule might have had dubious status in Tennessee law, the Tennessee Supreme Court had explained that it was the law, and the Court typically takes such statements at face value. In the absence of any fair warning, as he saw it, Scalia concluded that Rogers's conviction for murder was not valid.

== See also ==
- List of United States Supreme Court cases, volume 532
- List of United States Supreme Court cases
