= Intention in English law =

Concept in criminal law

In English criminal law, intention is one of the types of mens rea (Latin for "guilty mind") that, when accompanied by an actus reus (Latin for "guilty act"), constitutes a crime.

== The standard definitions ==
Judges normally do not define intention for juries, and the weight of authority is to give it its current meaning in everyday language as directed by the House of Lords in R v Moloney, where can be found references to a number of definitions of intention using subjective and objective tests, and knowledge of consequences of actions or omissions. Intention is generally defined in terms of foresight of particular consequences and a desire to act or fail to act so that those consequences occur. It is distinguished from recklessness because, on a subjective basis, there is foresight but no desire to produce the consequences. But the perennial problem has always been the extent to which the court can impute sufficient desire to convert recklessness into intention. The original rule was objective. DPP v Smith changed this by saying that the test was that a person was taken to foresee and intend the natural and probable consequences of his or her acts. Parliament reacted with s 8 of the Criminal Justice Act 1967 to restore the position originally at common law. In Frankland v The Queen, Lord Ackner held DPP v Smith to be incorrect insofar as it required objective foresight in determining intention of murder, saying that the common law reflected s 8 of the 1967 Act.

Given that s8 of the Criminal Justice Act 1967 now entitles a jury to draw reasonable inferences from all the evidence, Wien J. said in R v Belfon that:

Foresight and recklessness are evidence from which intent may be inferred but they cannot be equated...with intent.

Thus, when as in R v Moloney the defendant gets into an argument with his stepfather about who could load a shotgun and fire quickest, in the argument the stepfather was shot dead and Moloney was charged with murder. Lord Bridge held there was no rule that foresight of probable consequences was equivalent to, or alternative to, the necessary intention for a crime of specific intent. (Moloney established that a person can have intention, where they did not want the result but merely foresaw it.) rather, the question of foresight of consequences was a part of the law of evidence. Lord Bridge gives the example of a man boarding a plane which he knows to be bound for Manchester. He "conclusively demonstrates" his intention to go there. It is not merely evidence from which such intention may be inferred. In the rare case where it may be necessary to direct a jury by reference to foresight of consequences, two questions arise:

(a) was death or very serious injury a natural consequence of the defendant's voluntary act? (b) did the defendant foresee that consequence as being a natural consequence of his act?

If the answer to both questions was in the affirmative, an inference could be drawn that the defendant had intended that consequence. What was a "natural" consequence?

...in the ordinary course of events a certain act will lead to a certain consequence unless something unexpected supervenes to prevent it... [and] the probability of the consequence taken to have been foreseen must be little short of overwhelming before it will suffice to establish the necessary intent.

The issue then focused on the probability that the particular harm will result from what is done. In R v Hancock & Shankland Lord Scarman puts it:

..the greater the probability of a consequence the more likely it is that the consequence was foreseen and if that consequence was foreseen, the greater the probability is that it was also intended.

In R v Nedrick the Court of Appeal through Lord Lane summarised the law as follows:

...if the jury are satisfied that at the material time the defendant recognised that death or serious harm would be virtually certain (barring some unforeseen intervention) to result from his voluntary act, then that is a fact from which they may find it easy to infer that he intended to kill or do serious bodily harm, even though he may not have had any desire to achieve that result...Where the charge is murder and in the rare cases where the simple direction is not enough, the jury should be directed that they are not entitled to infer the necessary intention unless they feel sure that death or serious bodily harm was a virtual certainty (barring some unforeseen intervention) as a result of the defendant's actions and that the defendant appreciated that such was the case.

After Lord Steyn's judgment in R v Woollin (affirmed in R v Matthews & Alleyne [2004]) it is clear that, based on R v Moloney, foresight of death or grievous bodily harm as a mere probability is insufficient. This confirms R v Nedrick subject to the substitution of "infer" for "find".

Where the charge is murder and in the rare cases where the simple direction is not enough, the jury should be directed that they are not entitled to find the necessary intention unless they feel sure that death or serious bodily harm was a virtual certainty (barring some unforeseen intervention) as a result of the defendant's action and that the defendant appreciated that such was the case.

It is clear that Lord Steyn intended that a virtual or moral certainty test should necessarily lead to a finding of intention. But by phrasing the guidelines in terms of what the jury are not entitled to do, the clarity of the direction is compromised. He may have felt that the jury are entitled to indirectly infer but not directly find intention. It would have been better expressed as a positive; i.e. "if the jury are sure that the defendant foresaw death or grievous bodily harm as a virtual certainty this equals intention". Nevertheless, it seems that "a result foreseen as virtually certain is an intended result", It is not clear that Lord Steyn intended the above meaning. Parliament required that the jury not be directed to find intention, and Lord Steyn cannot have intended to contravene Parliament's wishes. Where the jury are sure that the defendant foresaw the required level of harm to be a virtual certainty this is evidence which the jury may consider in consideration of whether the defendant personally intended this harm.

== Double effect ==
In medical cases the doctrine of double effect can be used as a defence. As was established by Judge Devlin in the 1957 trial of Dr John Bodkin Adams, causing death through the administration of lethal drugs to a patient, if the intention is solely to alleviate pain, is not considered murder even if death is a potential or even likely outcome.

== Proposals for reform ==
In 1978, the Law Commission of England and Wales published a Report on the Mental Element in Crime and proposed a revised definition of intention (to apply to all intention-based offences):

a person should be regarded as intending a particular result of his conduct if, but only if, either he actually intends that result or he has no substantial doubt that the conduct will have that result".

In 1980 the Criminal Law Revision Committee, in its Report on Offences Against the Person, rejected a test based on knowledge of a high probability that death will result from one's actions. This was felt to be unsatisfactory because a test expressed in terms of probability was so uncertain in result. However, the Committee felt that it would be too narrow to confine intent to cases where the accused desires a certain result, preferring to include cases where the accused knows a particular result will follow. Therefore, according to the Committee a person intends a result when he:

(i)...wants the particular result to follow from his act, or
(ii)...though he may not want the result to follow, knows that in the ordinary course of things it will do so.

In 1985, The Law Commission Report on Codification of the Criminal Law proposed the following definition of murder:

A person who kills another:

(a) intending to kill; or
(b) intending to cause serious injury and being aware that he may kill; [or
(c) intending to cause fear of death or serious injury and being aware that he may kill]

is guilty of murder.

The definition of intention provides that someone "intends" a result when:

...he wants it to exist or occur, is aware that it exists or is almost certain that it exists or will exist or occur.

In 1993, the Law Commission revisited the definition of 'intention' proposing that:

[A] person acts....'intentionally' with respect to a result when:
(i) it is his purpose to cause it; or
(ii) although it is not his purpose to cause that result, he knows that it would occur in the ordinary course of events if he were to succeed in his purpose of causing some other result.

In 2006 the Law Commission’s made its most recent recommendation on the meaning of intention (Murder, Manslaughter and Infanticide (Report No. 304 HC 30) at para 3.27):

"We recommend that the existing law governing the meaning of intention is codified as follows:

(1) A person should be taken to intend a result if he or she acts in order to bring it about.
(2) In cases where the judge believes that justice may not be done unless an expanded understanding of intention is given, the jury should be directed as follows: an intention to bring about a result may be found if it is shown that the defendant thought that the result was a virtually certain consequence of his or her action"
