= Dutch courage =

Reduced inhibitions due to alcohol

Dutch courage, also known as pot-valiance or liquid courage, refers to courage gained from intoxication with alcohol.

== Uses ==
=== Criminal ===
Alcohol is occasionally used by criminals as a tool to commit alcohol-related offenses. These may include alcohol-facilitated sexual assaults, drunk driving, thefts (for example motor vehicle thefts), or alcohol-fueled robberies and violent crimes. However, Dutch courage defense is not a valid intoxication defense.

Consuming alcohol prior to visiting female sex workers is a common practice among some men. Also, sex workers often resort to using drugs and alcohol to cope with stress. However, female sex workers in low- and middle-income countries have high rates of harmful alcohol use, which is associated with increased risk of unprotected sex and sexually transmitted infections.

=== Hookup culture ===
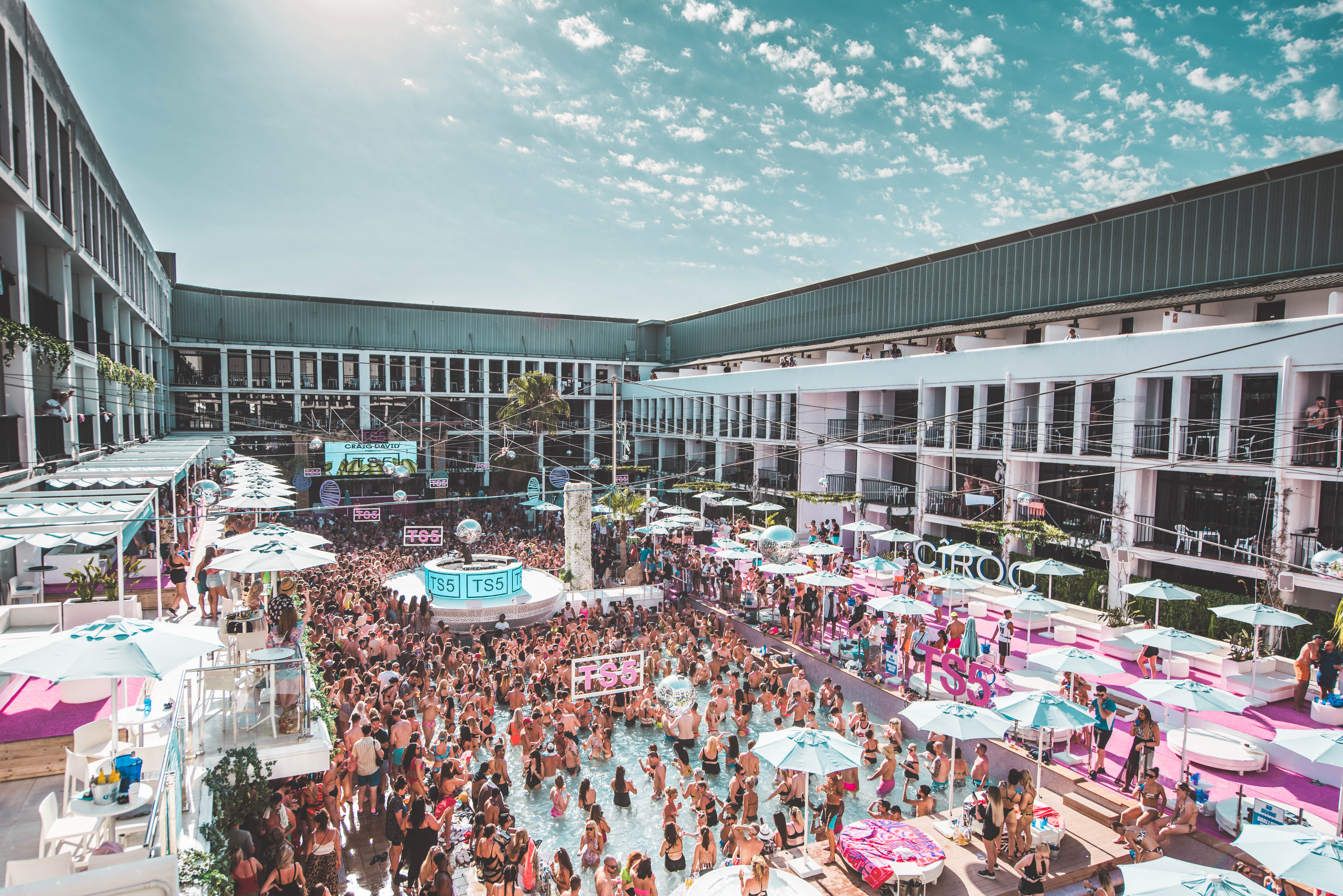
Pool party at Ibiza Rocks hotel

Alcohol use among college students is often used as "liquid courage" in the hookup culture, for them to make a sexual advance in the first place. However, a recent trend called "dry dating" is gaining popularity to replace "liquid courage", which involves going on dates without consuming alcohol.

=== Warfare ===
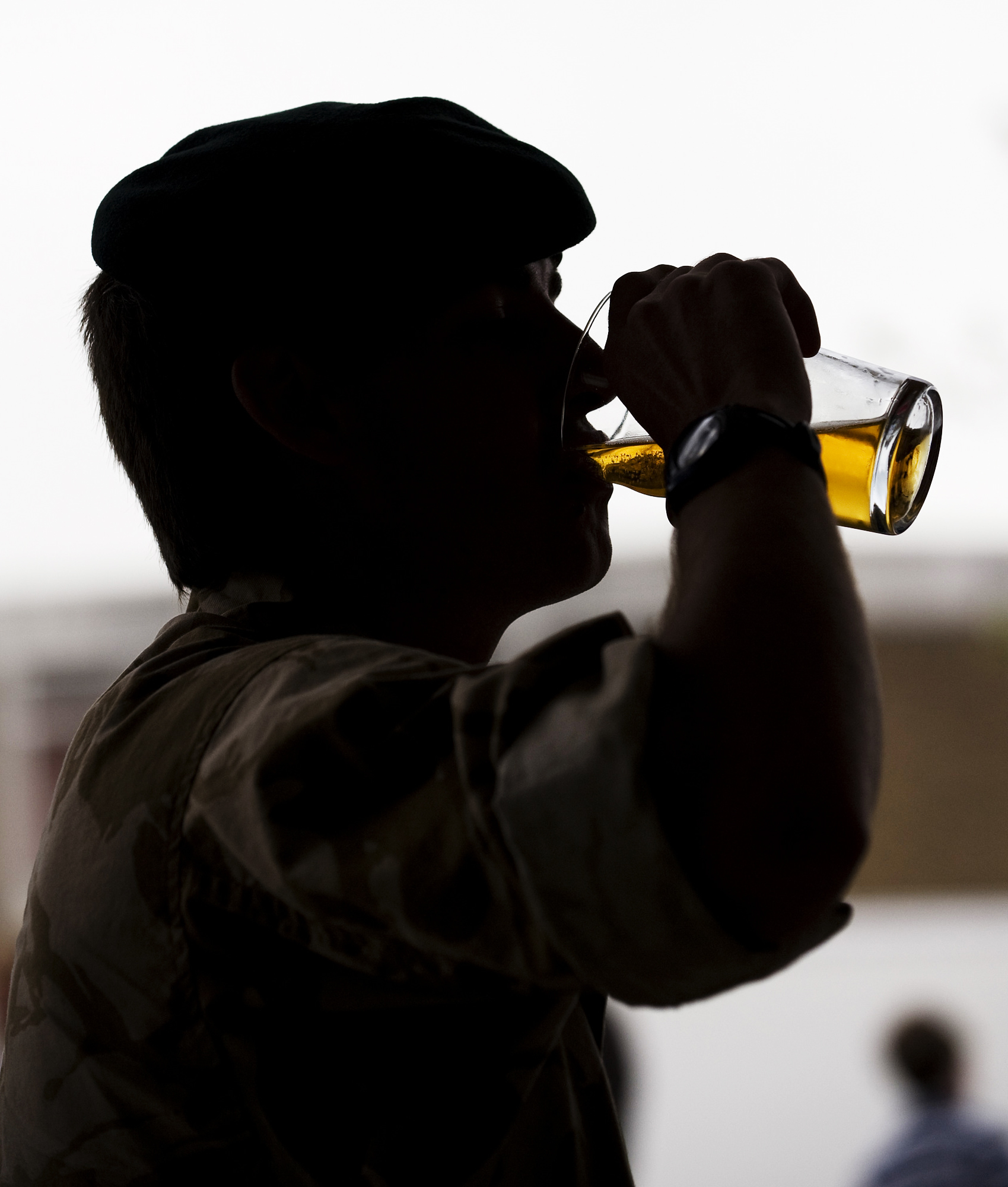
A British soldier drinks a pint of beer on returning from a deployment to Afghanistan.

Alcohol has a long association of military use, and has been called "liquid courage" for its role in preparing troops for battle. It has also been used to anaesthetize injured soldiers, celebrate military victories, and cope with the emotions of defeat.

Military and veteran populations face significant challenges in addressing the co-occurrence of PTSD and alcohol use disorder. While existing interventions show promise, more research is needed to evaluate their effectiveness for this specific population, and new tailored interventions should be developed and evaluated to better meet their unique needs.

== History ==
The popular story dates the etymology of the term Dutch courage to English soldiers fighting in the Anglo-Dutch Wars (1652–1674) and perhaps as early as the Thirty Years' War (1618–1648). One version states that jenever (or Dutch gin) was used by English soldiers for its calming effects before battle, and for its purported warming properties on the body in cold weather. Another version has it that English soldiers noted the bravery-inducing effects of jenever on Dutch soldiers.

Gin is a Dutch invention, and was first distilled in Holland in the 16th century. The flavouring in gin comes from juniper berries. The Dutch word for 'juniper' is 'jenever', which was then Anglicised to 'ginever' and then finally to 'gin'. Gin would go on to become popular in England thanks to King William III of England (William of Orange, r. 1689–1702), who was also Stadtholder of the Netherlands.

There is a strong association of military service and alcohol use disorder. In 1862, British soldiers in India responded to the threat of problematic alcohol use by establishing the Soldiers' Total Abstinence Association, which became the Army Temperance Association in 1888. Similar organizations formed in other branches of military and for British troops stationed in other colonies. Members of these abstinence associations were encouraged to sign pledges to avoid alcohol entirely. Medals were awarded to individuals who remained abstinent. Studies show that Australian Defence Force veterans of the Gulf War had a prevalence of alcohol use disorder higher than any other psychological disorder; British Armed Forces veterans of modern conflicts in Iraq and Afghanistan had higher rates of alcohol use disorder than servicemembers who were not deployed.

Alcohol has a long association of military use, and has been called "liquid courage" for its role in preparing troops for battle. It has also been used to anaesthetize injured soldiers, celebrate military victories, and cope with the emotions of defeat. In the Russo-Japanese War, alcohol has been implicated as a factor contributing to the Russian Empire's loss. Russian commanders, sailors, and soldiers were said to be drunk more than sober. Countries often enabled alcohol use by their troops through providing alcohol in their rations. The British Royal Navy and other Commonwealth navies once maintained a rum ration for sailors until Britain retired it in 1970. The Royal Canadian Navy followed suit in 1972 as did the Royal New Zealand Navy in 1990. The United States Navy similarly provided a distilled spirits ration between 1794 and 1862 when Secretary of the Navy Gideon Welles removed most non-medicinal alcohol from U.S. naval vessels, with all alcohol consumption aboard ship banned in 1914.

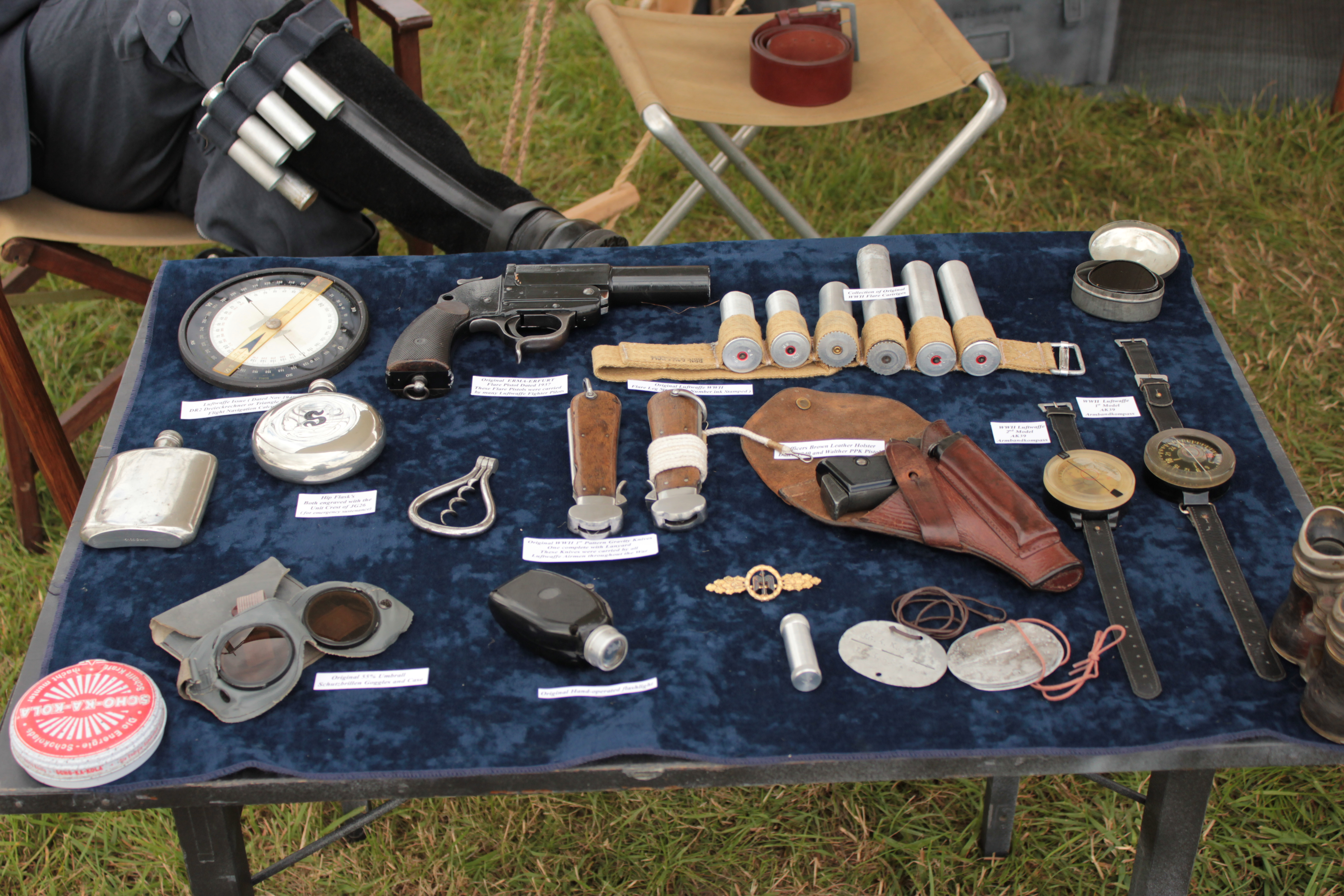
Two hip flasks, located in the left-center, are featured in the military equipment used as emergency sustenance by the Luftwaffe, which was the air force of Nazi Germany during World War II.

At the start of World War II, alcohol consumption was widespread among members of the Wehrmacht of Nazi Germany. At first, high-ranking officials encouraged its use as a means of relaxation and a crude method of mitigating the psychological effects of combat, in the latter case through what later scientific developments would describe as blocking the consolidation of traumatic memories. After the Fall of France, however, Wehrmacht commanders observed that their soldiers' behavior was deteriorating, with "fights, accidents, mistreatment of subordinates, violence against superior officers and "crimes involving unnatural sexual acts" becoming more frequent. The Commander-in-Chief of the German military, General Walther von Brauchitsch, concluded that his troops were committing "most serious infractions" of morality and discipline, and that the culprit was alcohol abuse. In response, Hitler attempted to curb the reckless use of alcohol in the military, promising severe punishment for soldiers who exhibited public drunkenness or otherwise "allow[ed] themselves to be tempted to engage in criminal acts as a result of alcohol abuse." Serious offenders could expect "a humiliating death." This revised policy accompanied an increase in Nazi Party disapproval of alcohol use in the civilian sector, reflecting an extension to alcohol of the longstanding Nazi condemnation of tobacco consumption as diminishing the strength and purity of the "Aryan race".

== See also ==
- Double Dutch
- Going Dutch (a.k.a. Dutch treat, Dutch date)
