= Year and a day rule =

Legal time limit on attribution of a crime

The year and a day rule is associated with the former common law standard that death could not be legally attributed to acts or omissions that occurred more than a year and a day before the death.

== The rule and homicide ==
In English common law, it was held that a death was conclusively presumed not to be murder (or any other homicide) if it occurred more than a year and one day since the act (or omission) that was alleged to have been its cause. The rule also applied to the offence of assisting with a suicide.

Certain problems with this rule arise from the advance of medicine. Life support technology can extend the interval between the murderous act and the subsequent death. Application of the year and a day rule prevented murder prosecutions, not because of the merits of the case, but because of the successful intervention of doctors in prolonging life. Additionally, advances in forensic medicine may assist the court to determine that an act was a cause of death even though it was carried out fairly far in the past.

=== England and Wales, Northern Ireland ===
The rule was abolished by the Law Reform (Year and a Day Rule) Act 1996. English and Welsh law and Northern Irish law is now substantially revised such that if a specific action can be proved to be the cause of death, it can now potentially constitute murder regardless of the intervening time. The abolition of the rule does not relieve the prosecution of its obligation to prove the mens rea element; in cases of murder, this is the accused intended to cause either death or serious injury.

The permission of the Attorney General for England and Wales or Attorney General for Northern Ireland is required for any prosecution in which it is alleged that the death occurred more than three years after the causative act, or when the offender has previously been convicted of an offence in connection with the death.

=== New Zealand ===
New Zealand had a year and a day rule until it was abolished unanimously in March 2018.

=== United States ===
- In 1891, the rule was upheld at the federal level in United States v. Ball.
- In 1987, the District of Columbia Court of Appeals, the highest local court in Washington, DC, rejected the year-and-a-day-rule in United States v. Jackson.
- In 2001, the Supreme Court of the United States held that a Tennessee court's retroactive abolition of the rule was constitutional in Rogers v. Tennessee, since the ex post facto clause only prohibits an ex post facto law from being passed, but does not prohibit a judicial organ from revising the common law in an ex post facto manner.

The rule's common law status has been successfully used by defendants to overturn convictions as recently as 2003: the Supreme Court of Wisconsin upheld the year and a day rule in the case before it, but simultaneously abolished the rule for any later cases, noting the modern circumstances of homicide cases, in which there is "the specter of a family's being forced to choose between terminating the use of a life-support system and allowing an accused to escape a murder charge" and the court's finding that it is "unjust to permit an assailant to escape punishment because of a convergence of modern medical advances and an archaic rule from the thirteenth century".

In California, the "year and a day" rule has been changed to a "three years and a day" rule. If a death occurs more than three years and one day after the act alleged to have caused it (and the act was committed on or after 1 January 1997), there is "a rebuttable presumption that the killing was not criminal", but the prosecution may seek to overcome this presumption. However, if the murder is committed by somebody who is serving a term of life imprisonment and is sentenced to state prison the year and a day rule applies instead.

In 2014, the D.C. rule (as it existed in 1981) was one of the reasons given for why John Hinckley, the attempted assassin of President Ronald Reagan, could not be prosecuted for the murder of James S. Brady. The medical examiner listed the cause of death for Brady as bullets fired 33 years earlier.

=== Hong Kong ===
The rule was abolished in 2000 by section 33C of the Offences against the Person Ordinance (Cap. 212).

== Where the rule is not applied to homicide ==
=== Jurisdictions where the rule has never applied ===
The following countries are listed in the Report on the Year and a Day Rule in Homicide with the observation that "the rule has never applied":

- Austria
- France
- Germany
- Greece
- Italy
- Poland
- Scotland
  The report also said "It was held in H.M. Advocate v Stewart that the Crown may be barred from proceeding with a trial if it would be oppressive for them to do so in view of the passage of time since the discovery of the offence."
- South Africa

=== Jurisdictions where the rule has been abolished ===
- England and Wales, Northern Ireland
  See the main introduction above.
- Republic of Ireland
  The rule was abolished "for all purposes" including "for the purposes of offences involving the death of a person, and for the purpose of determining whether a person committed suicide" by the section 38 of the Criminal Justice Act 1999.
- Hong Kong
  The rule was abolished "for all purposes" in Hong Kong by section 33C of the Offences Against the Person Ordinance, which is added by the Statute Law (Miscellaneous Provisions) Ordinance 2000 following the recommendation of the Law Reform Commission of Hong Kong. The Commission did not consider it necessary to set a time limit beyond which prosecutions required the consent of the Secretary of Justice.

== As a sentence for felons ==
A year and a day is a minimum incarceration sentence for felonies in many jurisdictions, and is one of the main features distinguishing felonies from misdemeanors. For some crimes, this is the minimum penalty, as traditionally in English-speaking, common law countries, misdemeanors may not entail a sentence of more than a year, whereas felonies are traditionally punished by incarceration of over one year, hence "a year and a day." Furthermore, in many jurisdictions, prisoners are eligible for parole only if their sentences are longer than a year; by imposing a sentence of a year and a day, judges can offer defendants a chance at parole. In the United States federal system, only sentences exceeding one year allow prisoners to obtain early release for good behaviour while incarcerated. As a result, a sentence of a year and a day can lead to less time served than a sentence of a year.

== See also ==
- Speedy trial
