= Intoxication defense =

Legal defense of diminished responsibility

In criminal law, the intoxication defense is a defense by which a defendant may claim diminished responsibility on the basis of substance intoxication. Where a crime requires a certain mental state (mens rea) to break the law, those under the influence of an intoxicating substance may be considered to have reduced liability for their actions. With regard to punishment, intoxication may be a mitigating factor that decreases a prison or jail sentence. Numerous factors affect the applicability of the defense.

== Variation ==
Societies have varied in their attitudes and cultural standards regarding public intoxication, historically based on the relationship between religion and drugs in general, and religion and alcohol in particular. In some instances, consumption of a mind-altering substance has formed the basis of religious or other socially approved ceremonies and festivals. In others, intoxication has been stigmatized as a sign of human weakness, of immorality, or as a sin.

Secular approaches may also vary, having less inherent opposition to drugs but acknowledging that these may affect the inhibitions that help to keep socialized individuals from breaking prevailing social taboos which may or may not have been expressly criminalized. The attitude of a legal system to intoxicating substances can affect the applicability of intoxication as a defense under its laws: a system strongly opposed to a substance may even view intoxication as an aggravating factor rather than a mitigating one.

The effect of intoxication on criminal responsibility varies by jurisdiction and offense. The criminal code in question may require proof of various levels of intent. This may range from premeditation, through various degrees of intent or willingness to commit a crime, general recklessness, and finally no intent at all in some instances of strict liability.

Intoxication may serve as a defense against proving more specific forms of intent. If so, its potential effectiveness will sometimes hinge on whether the defendant's intoxication was voluntary or involuntary: the defense would be denied defendants who had voluntarily disabled themselves by knowingly consuming an intoxicating substances, but allowed to those who had consumed it unknowingly or against their will.

== Voluntary and involuntary consumption ==
A distinction may be made based on whether the defendant chose to become intoxicated, and is thus responsible for their diminished control or not. As an example, in the Dutch courage defense (see the Gallagher case in English law on intoxication), the accused hates his spouse but fears to take action. The accused therefore buys a bottle of brandy and a sharp knife. In the morning, the bottle is empty and the knife is in the spouse's heart. Because the accused had a plan and weakening the inhibitions by drunkenness was a part of that plan, an intoxication defense is not feasible. But if, at a party, a bowl of fruit punch is "spiked" by someone who secretly adds gin, the resulting drunkenness is not voluntary and might be considered a possible defense. A sharper distinction is drawn in Islamic law, where involuntary intoxication may remove criminal if not financial responsibility, while voluntary intoxication has no effect and the accused is treated as if sober.

=== Foreseeability test ===
The presence or absence of liability may hang on a foreseeability test. The fact that the consumption of alcohol or the ingestion of drugs may cause a loss of control is well known. Thus, anyone who knowingly consumes is, at the very least, reckless as to the possibility of losing control. If they did not wish to lose control, they would not consume, so loss of control must be within the scope of their intention by continuing to consume. But, loss of control is not instantaneous and without symptoms. The issue of involuntary consumption is therefore contentious. In most legal systems, involuntary loss of control is limited to cases where there is no real loss of control with noticeable symptoms. Thus, for example, in many states, the blood alcohol level for the commission of the offence of driving under the influence is set sufficiently low that people might exceed the limit without realising that they had consumed enough alcohol to do so. Leaving aside the issue that, in some states, this is a strict liability offense excluding drunkenness as a defense, there is usually a requirement that the person who "spiked" the drinks be prosecuted in place of the driver. This reflects the fact that the commission of a crime has been procured by the actions of secretly adding the alcohol and the practical fact that without this rule, too many accused who are only marginally over the limit, might be encouraged to blame others for their intoxication.

In the US, the Model Penal Code also includes the possibility of "pathological intoxication" whereby a medical condition allows a small amount of alcohol to cause disproportionate intoxication that the drinker could not foresee.

More generally, the defense would be denied to people experiencing symptoms of intoxication who continued to consume the spiked drink because they ought to have known what was happening to them. Equally, if no further consumption occurred but they ought to have recognized that they were affected by an unknown substance, beginning an activity such as driving would not fall within the defense. In other words, the policy underpinning the operation of the law favors the protection of the public as against the interests of an individual who recklessly or with wilful blindness exposes the public to danger.

== Offenses of basic and of specific intent ==
In some states, a distinction is based on the nature of the mens rea requirement. While voluntary intoxication may not be a defense to an offense of basic (sometimes termed "general") intent, it is allowed as a defense to offenses requiring a specific intent. This term refers to two separate types of offense:

1. A limited number of offenses require a further element of intent beyond the basic intent (where the mens rea is no more than the intentional or reckless commission of the actus reus). This additional element is termed specific intent.
2. The inchoate offenses such as attempt, solicitation, and conspiracy require specific intent in a slightly different sense. The test for the existence of mens rea may be:

(a) subjective where the court must be satisfied that the accused actually had the requisite mental element present in his or her mind at the relevant time (see concurrence);
(b) objective where the requisite mens rea element is imputed to the accused on the basis that the reasonable person would have had the mental element in the same circumstances;
(c) hybrid where the test is both subjective and objective.

The rationale for the existence of criminal laws is as a deterrent to those who represent a danger to society. If an accused has actually committed the full offence, the reality of the danger has been demonstrated. For where the commission of the actus reus is in the future, a clear subjective intention to cause the actus reus of the full offense must be demonstrated. Without this "specific intent", there is insufficient evidence that the accused is the clear danger as feared because, at any time before the commission of the full offense, the accused may change his or her mind and not continue.

If a "specific intent" in either sense is required and there is clear evidence that the accused was too intoxicated to form the element subjectively, this fact is recognised as a defense unless the loss of control was part of the plan. This, however, is of little value to defendants since there are almost always offenses of basic intent that can be charged and/or the basic intent offenses are usually lesser included offenses and an alternative verdict can be delivered by judge or jury without the need for a separate charge. In English law, note the controversial Jaggard v Dickinson [1980] 3 All ER 716 which held that, for the purposes of the statutory defense of lawful excuse under s5 Criminal Damage Act 1971, a drunken belief will found the defense even though this allows drunkenness to negate basic intent. This is limited authority and does not affect the generality of the defense.

Examples of specific intent crimes include first degree murder based on premeditation and deliberation, attempts, burglary (intent to commit larceny), larceny (intent to steal), possession of or receiving stolen property (intent to steal), and robbery (intent to steal). General intent crimes include arson, rape, common law murder, and voluntary manslaughter.

== See also ==
- Settled insanity
