= R v Woollin =

1998 House of Lords criminal law case

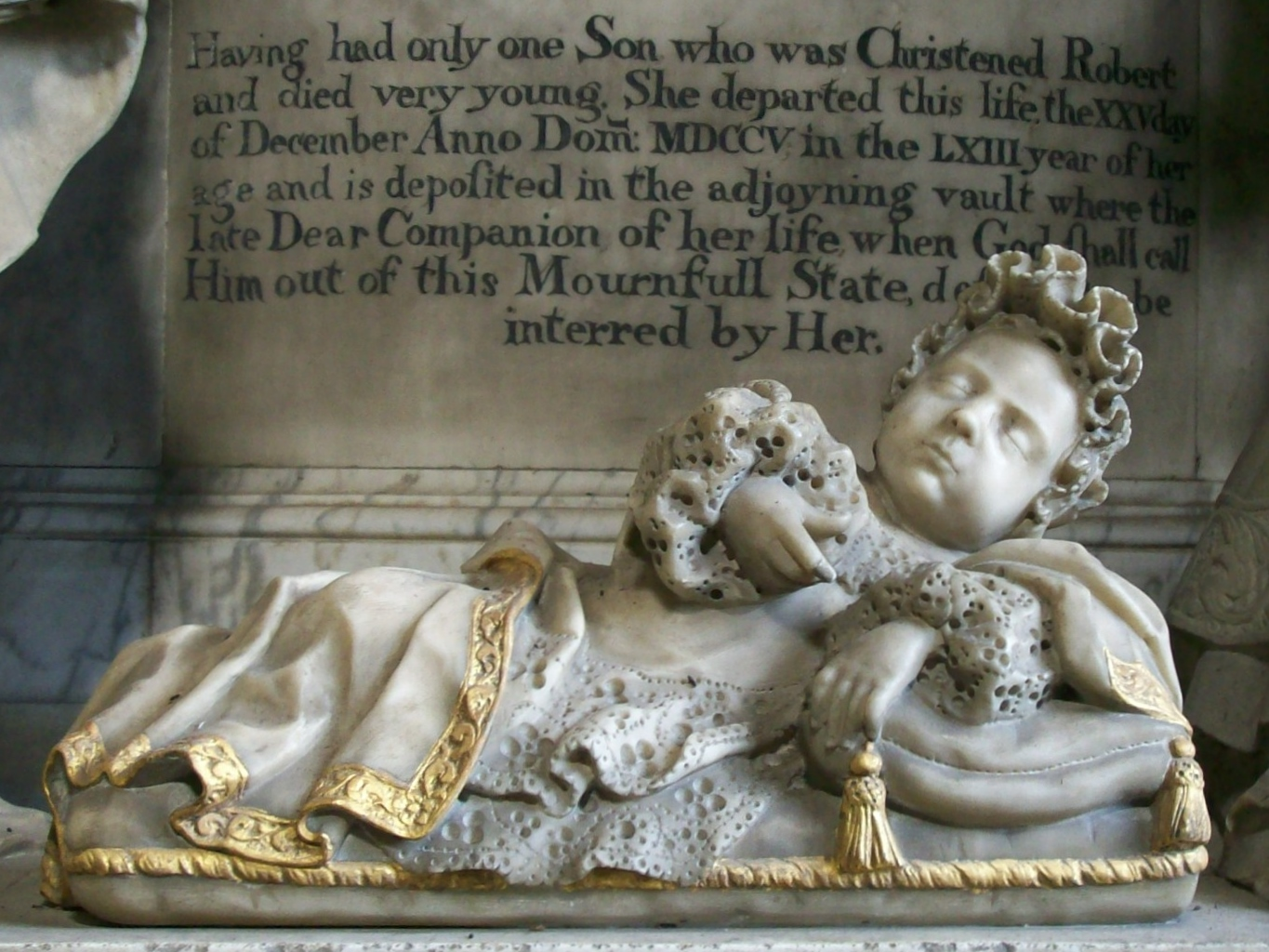
- Effigy of a son of Sir Robert Clayton MP who died in infancy in 1705. St Mary's church, Bletchingley
- Court: House of Lords
- Full case name: R v Stephen Leslie Woollin
- Decided: appeal heard on three days in June; decision pronounced on 22 July 1998
- Citation: [1999] 1 A.C. 82; [1998] 3 W.L.R. 382; [1998] 4 All E.R. 103; [1999] 1 Cr App R 8
- Cases cited: R v Nedrick
- Legislation cited: Criminal Appeal Act 1968; Criminal Justice Act 1967

Case history
- Prior action: Appeal dismissed in the Court of Appeal [1997] 1 Cr App R 97, CA
- Subsequent action: none applicable

Court membership
- Judges sitting: Lord Browne-Wilkinson; Lord Nolan; Lord Steyn; Lord Hoffmann; Lord Hope of Craighead

Keywords
- intention; mens rea; homicide; malice aforethought (special intention for murder); virtually certain consequence: death

R v Woollin was an English criminal law case in which the House of Lords clarified the type of intention required to establish the mens rea of murder. The House ultimately quashed Woollin’s murder conviction and substituted a conviction of manslaughter.

== Facts ==
Having given various explanations for his three-month-old son's injuries in the ambulance and in the first two police interviews, Woollin eventually admitted that he had 'lost his cool' when his son would not stop crying for hours. He had picked him up, shaken him and thrown him across the room with considerable force towards a pram next to a wall about 5 feet (1.5 m) away. He stated that he had not intended nor thought that he would kill the child and had not wanted the child to die. His actions caused the infant's death as the child hit the floor hard, missing the pram.

== Appeals ==
Woollin's murder conviction was upheld in the Court of Appeal. The House of Lords, not the lower court, gave leave to appeal as the jury instructions were that there had to be "substantial risk" of death or grievous bodily harm, which was held to be far wider in scope than virtual certainty; and the actions duly considered in the round on the facts stated as proven by the jury fell short of virtual certainty. The Lords quashed the conviction.

Lord Steyn affirmed the test in R v Nedrick, and Lord Hope of Craighead substituted the verb 'infer' for more common 'find', in the formula by which the jury can find indirect intention, i.e. the intention of the person who does not aim to kill or even to cause grievous bodily harm but nonetheless takes (what he knows to be) an outrageously high risk of doing so to someone around, where the result of the action was virtually certain to be death or grievous bodily harm (objective test), and the defendant personally foresaw this (subjective test):

Where the charge is murder and in the rare cases where the simple direction is not enough, the jury should be directed that they are not entitled to find the necessary intention, unless they feel sure that death or serious bodily harm was a virtual certainty (barring some unforeseen intervention) as a result of the defendant's actions and that the defendant appreciated that such was the case.

— Lord Steyn

That verb "entitles" rather than say "obliged" or "have to" connotes that they have no obligation to find the intention—it stresses the second limb requirement: they need to feel there is circumstantial evidence (or an admission) for a consensus that the defendant must surely have appreciated death or serious injury would almost certainly happen.

== Reception ==
In R v Matthews and Alleyne, the Court of Appeal concluded that the Woollin test was an evidential rather than substantial rule of law: judges ought to instruct jurors that they may interpret what they would see as certain knowledge on the defendant's part of the virtually certain consequence of death as evidence of intention, but Woollin does not substantively define a secondary type of intention.

The formula is controversial per a large body of academic experts as it gives no illustrations of when knowledge can be rightly and wrongly imputed (ascribed to a person), and gives breadth for possible leniency on grounds unknown.
