= Roy Beldam =

British judge (1925–2020)

The Right Honourable Sir Roy Beldam

Lord Justice of Appeal
- In office 1989–2000

Personal details
- Born: 29 March 1925
- Died: 16 October 2020 (aged 95)
- Occupation: Judge
- Profession: Barrister

Sir Alexander Roy Asplin Beldam, PC (29 March 1925 – 16 October 2020) was a British judge who served as Lord Justice of Appeal in England and Wales from 1989 until 2000.

== Early years ==
He was the son of the first-class cricketer and photographer George Beldam and his second wife, Margaret Underwood.

After attending Oundle School, he served in the wartime Royal Navy Fleet Air Arm, flying as an Observer in Grumman Avengers with the British Pacific Fleet.

== Career ==
He was called to the Bar in 1950 and made Queen's Counsel in 1969. After appointment as a Recorder in 1972, he was appointed a judge of the High Court in 1981 for which he received the customary knighthood.

In 1989, he was elevated to the Court of Appeal of England and Wales, where he served until his retirement in 2000. He was made a member of the Privy Council in 1989. He also served as Legal Assessor to the General Medical Council from 1976–81, and as Chairman of the Law Commission from 1985–89. He was also a Bencher of the Inner Temple.

His daughter, Alexandra Beldam, was called to the Bar in 1981 and has been the Registrar of Criminal Appeals, Master of the Crown Office and Queen's Coroner since 5 November 2018.

He died on 16 October 2020 at the age of 95.
