= R v Smith (Thomas Joseph) =

1959 English criminal law case

- Court: Court of Appeal (Criminal Division) sitting as the Court-Martial Appeal Court
- Full case name: Regina or The Queen or The Crown versus (or and) Thomas Joseph Smith
- Decided: 1959

Case history
- Prior action: Conviction in a Court-Martial.
- Subsequent action: None

Court membership
- Judges sitting: Lord Parker CJ (per curiam); two others (i.e. concurring)

Keywords
- murder; new intervening omission; chain of causation; medical negligence

R v Smith (Thomas Joseph) [1959] 2 QB 35 is an English criminal law case, dealing with causation and homicide. The court ruled that neither negligence of medical staff, nor being dropped on the way from a stretcher twice, constituted breaks in the chain of causation in murder cases.

== Facts ==
A soldier intentionally stabbed a comrade, C, in the chest. On the way to the medical centre, C had been dropped twice by comrades carrying him and, on arrival, the doctor failed to notice that one of C's lungs had been pierced, causing haemorrhage, and the treatment provided was, as it later turned out, inappropriate and harmful. Had he had appropriate treatment, he might not have died.

== Jury instruction and jury decision ==
Lord Parker CJ, delivering the judgment of the Courts-Martial Appeal Court, said, at p. 48:

"If at the time of death the original wound is still an operating cause and a substantial cause, then the death can properly be said to be the result of the wound, albeit that some other cause of death is also operating. Only if it can be said that the original wounding is merely the setting in which another cause operates can it be said that the death did not result from the wound. Putting it another way, only if the second cause is so overwhelming as to make the original wound merely part of the history can it be said that the death does not flow from the wound."

The jury agreed with one of the competing propositions put to it, namely that the stabbing was still the "operating" (interpreted as primary or main) cause of death, and therefore found guilt.

The Court of Appeal upheld this decision and its reasoning. The case has been cited with approval and stated as applied to date, such as in the 2017 Northern Irish appeal, R v Okrasa.

== See also ==
- R v Blaue
- R v Cheshire (1991)
