= Intoxication in English law =

Intoxication in English law is a circumstance which may alter the capacity of a defendant to form mens rea, where a charge is one of specific intent, or may entirely negate mens rea where the intoxication is involuntary. The fact that a defendant is intoxicated in the commission of a crime — whether voluntarily or not — has never been regarded as a full defence to criminal proceedings (unlike statutory defences such as self defence). Its development at common law has been shaped by the acceptance that intoxicated individuals do not think or act as rationally as they would otherwise, but also by a public policy necessity to punish individuals who commit crimes.

== Voluntary intoxication ==
The Earl of Birkenhead stated in 1920 that until the early 19th century voluntary drunkenness was never a defence, based on the principle that "a man who by his own voluntary act debauches and destroys his will power shall be no better situated in regard to criminal acts than a sober man". This was considered the authority by Lord Elwyn-Jones in the Majewski case. Instead, intoxication may assist the defence arguing that the defendant lacked the appropriate mens rea (mental element) for the crime.

=== Specific and basic intent ===
In Majewski, Lord Elwyn-Jones, giving judgement, indicated that a crime was one of specific intent if the mens rea went further than the actus reus; in other words, that the crime was one of ulterior intent. This makes sense in the case of burglary and of criminal damage with intent to endanger life, where the intent need not be carried out, and which have been judged crimes of specific intent. However, this fails to explain why murder is considered a crime of specific intent, despite the fact that its mental aspect is equal or less than the actus reus requirement of causing death.

Lord Simon's judgement in the same case advanced a different definition: crimes of specific intent required a "purposive element". The court in Heard considered a specific intent one which fitted either possible definition. However, murder is again an exception: it can be committed not by intent but by virtual certainty. Lord Elwyn-Jones also expressed that if a crime could be committed recklessly, it was one of basic intent. This is supported by a number of academics, who do however consider it a matter for the common law to establish by precedent.

Case law has established that murder, wounding or causing grievous bodily harm with intent, theft, robbery, burglary with intent to steal, handling stolen goods, some forms of criminal damage, and any attempt to commit a crime of specific intent are themselves crimes of specific intent. Where the defendant is on trial for a crime of specific intent, his state of intoxication will be relevant to whether he formed the required intent. If the defendant's intoxication is so significant as to prevent any sort of intent, this can lead to acquittal. A reduction in the strength of the formed intent is insufficient.

Manslaughter, rape, sexual assault, maliciously wounding or inflicting grievous bodily harm, kidnapping and false imprisonment, assault occasioning actual bodily harm and common assault have all been judged crimes of basic intent.

The court in Majewski refers to intoxication as a defence. If this were the case, in crimes of basic intent where it does not provide a defence, the counsel for the defendant could not argue that the defendant did not have the required mens rea because of intoxication. Accordingly, the mens rea become irrelevant and the Crown need not show it, thereby aiding the prosecution considerably. The alternative is that the voluntary intoxication provides a "prior fault" which substitutes for the mens rea required. However, the taking of alcohol or drugs probably bears little similarity to the rest of the crime the defendant stands accused of it. The alternative would be to require the prosecution to still show the required mens rea.

Neither possibility has been explored in the common law. Accordingly, it only possible to say that the defence cannot argue that intoxication provides a defence, where recklessness has been shown on the fact, in crimes of basic intent. It is possible that the prosecution would be allowed, in certain circumstances, to dispense with the original mens rea entirely and rely solely on the voluntary intoxication to provide the fault element.

=== Dutch courage ===
While generally an intoxicated individual cannot form specific intent to perform a crime, an exception to this rule is provided by the case of A-G for Northern Ireland v Gallagher. Here, Lord Denning stated the principle that if an individual forms an intention to commit a crime, and then intoxicates himself, the mens rea of his actions is not diminished to basic intent:

If a man, whilst sane and sober, forms an intention to kill and makes preparation for it, knowing it is a wrong thing to do, and then gets himself drunk so as to give himself Dutch courage to do the killing, and whilst drunk carries out his intention, he cannot rely on this self-induced drunkenness as a defence to a charge of murder, nor even as reducing it to manslaughter.

== Involuntary intoxication ==
Unlike cases where a defendant has intoxicated himself voluntarily, the courts have taken a far more lenient view of defendants who become intoxicated through no fault of their own. Involuntary intoxication is not necessarily a full defence to criminal charges, as there are several qualifications to what can be called 'involuntary', some of which have met criticism and calls for reform. Nevertheless, a defendant who successfully argues involuntary intoxication will not be held culpable for actions they carried out while intoxicated.

The first qualification to this is that a defendant cannot claim they are involuntarily intoxicated simply because they were misinformed or wrong about the alcohol content of what they were drinking. Thus in R v Allen a man who committed indecent assault and buggery was convicted, with his argument rejected that he did not realise the wine he was drinking was strongly alcoholic.

A second limitation imposed by the courts is that the defendant must have been exceptionally intoxicated in order to argue he had no mens rea to commit a crime. In effect, this means that – as was originally stated a century ago in R v Beard – it is no defence that one loses his inhibitions due to involuntary intoxication, and goes on to commit a crime. A recent example of this principle can be found in R v Kingston, where an individual, after having his drinks spiked by his co-defendant, committed indecent assault on a boy aged 15. It was found that the defendant had merely given way to his paedophilic intentions, and not lacked a mens rea to commit the acts altogether: the fact he was involuntarily intoxicated went only to mitigate sentencing.

== See also ==
- Voluntary intoxication in English law
