= R v Nedrick =

- Court: Court of Appeal
- Full case name: Regina v. Ransford Delroy Nedrick
- Decided: 10 July 1986 (evidence heard on 20 May)
- Citation: [1986] 1 WLR 1025; [1986] 3 All ER 1; 8 Cr. App. R. (S.) 179

Case history
- Prior action: Conviction at Stafford Crown Court (trial presided by Otton J.) in January 1985

Court membership
- Judges sitting: Lord Lane C.J., Leggatt and Kennedy JJ.

Case opinions
- Per curiam (unanimously): in the law of murder there will be no case to answer where intention to offend is inferred, unless the actions of the defendant are so dangerous that death or serious injury is a virtual certainty

Keywords
- oblique intention; murder; arson

R v Nedrick [1986] EWCA Crim 2 is an English criminal law case dealing with mens rea in murder. The case is a cornerstone as it sets down the "virtual certainty test". It applies wherever a form of indirect (oblique) intention is apparent and the charge is one of murder, or other very specific intent. The appellate court ruled, as a binding precedent, that in the law of murder there will be no case to answer where intention to offend is inferred, unless the actions of the defendant are so dangerous that death or serious injury is a virtual certainty.

== Facts ==
The defendant, Hansford Delroy Nedrick, had a grudge against a woman named Viola Foreshaw and threatened to "burn her out". On January 25, 1985, he poured paraffin oil through the letterbox of Foreshaw's home. The fire got out of control and one of Foreshaw's children, a boy named Lloyd, was killed. The defendant claimed he wished to frighten the victim rather than kill anyone.

== Appellate decision reasoning ==
The court set down model guidance for juries in cases where intention was unclear. Lord Lane CJ said:

Where the charge is murder and in the rare cases where the simple direction is not enough, the Jury should be directed that they are not entitled to infer the necessary intention unless they feel sure that death or serious bodily harm was a virtual certainty (barring some unforeseen intervention) as a result of the defendant's actions and that the defendant appreciated that such was the case... The decision is one for the Jury to be reached upon a consideration of all the evidence.

In summary, intent may be inferred if the following conditions are jointly satisfied:

1. The result was a virtual certain consequence of the defendant's conduct, and
2. The defendant knows that it is a virtually certain consequence.
