= English criminal law =

Legal system of England and Wales relating to crime

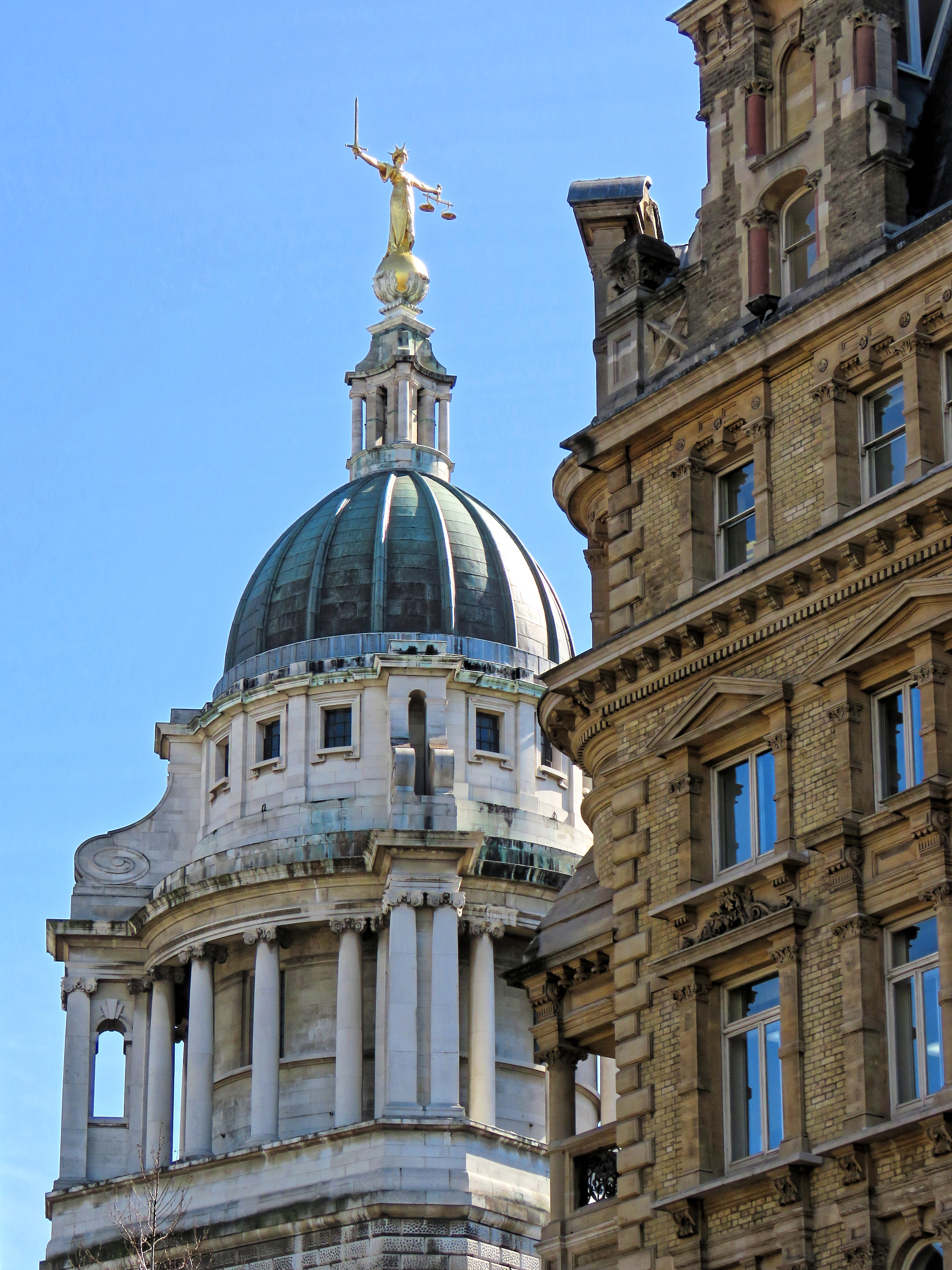
The Old Bailey, set on the old fortifications of the London wall, hears Crown Court trials for London. The statue of Lady Justice is meant to symbolise fairness and impartiality.

English criminal law concerns offences, their prevention and the consequences, in England and Wales. Criminal conduct is considered to be a wrongdoing against the whole of a community, rather than just the private individuals affected. The state, in addition to certain international organisations, has responsibility for crime prevention, for bringing the culprits to justice, and for dealing with convicted offenders. The police, the criminal courts and prisons are all publicly-funded services, though the main focus of criminal law concerns the role of the courts, how they apply criminal statutes and common law, and why some forms of behaviour are considered criminal.

There is no English Criminal Code though such an instrument has been often recommended and attempted. Criminal offences are set out in disparate legislative provisions and in common law. The fundamentals of a crime are a guilty act (or actus reus) and a guilty mental state (or mens rea). The traditional view is that moral culpability requires that a defendant should have recognised or intended that they were acting wrongly, although in modern regulation a large number of offences relating to road traffic, environmental damage, financial services and corporations, create strict liability that can be proven simply by the guilty act.

Defences exist to crimes. A person who is accused may in certain circumstances plead they are insane and did not understand what they were doing, that they were not in control of their bodies, they were intoxicated, mistaken about what they were doing, acted in self defence, acted under duress or out of necessity, or were provoked. These are issues to be raised at trial, for which there are detailed rules of evidence and procedure to be followed.

== History ==
England and Wales does not have a criminal code, though such an enactment has been often recommended and attempted (see English Criminal Code). Many criminal offences are common law offences rather than being specified in legislation.

In 1980, a Committee of JUSTICE said that, upon conducting a search, they found over 7,200 offences, and that they thought that there were probably many more. They said that "it is now impossible to ascertain the entire content of the criminal law at any given time". In 1989, the Law Commission said that a hypothetical criminal code that contained all existing criminal offences would be "impossibly bulky". In 2001, Peter Glazebrook said the criminal law was "voluminous, chaotic and contradictory". In March 2011, there were more than ten thousand offences excluding those created by by-laws. In 2006 it was widely reported that the Blair government had created 3000 new criminal offences since forming in 1997, although many of these were updates to existing offences.

In 1999, P J Richardson said that as the case for a moratorium on legislation in the field of criminal justice was becoming stronger and stronger, governments seemed ever more determined to bring forward more legislation.

Important statutes and cases include:

- Treason Act 1351 and Hanged, drawn and quartered. Petty treason and High treason in the United Kingdom
- Suppression of Heresy Act 1414 and John Wycliffe
- Carrier's Case (1473) YB Pasch 13 Edw. IV, f. 9., pl. 5, larceny
- Jesuits, etc. Act 1584
- Bushel's Case (1670) 124 E.R. 1006 writ of habeas corpus
- Habeas Corpus Act 1679
- Transportation Act 1717
- Black Act 1723
- Jacobite rising of 1745 and Transportation Act 1746 and 1768
- Murder Act 1751
- R v Pear (1779) 168 Eng Rep 208, larceny by trick
- Trial of Lord George Gordon (1781) for treason for the Gordon riots
- Case of the Dean of St Asaph or R v Shipley (1784) 4 Doug 73, seditious libel
- Burning of women in England and Treason Act 1790
- Bazeley's Case (1799) 2 East P.C. 571, establishing crime of embezzlement
- Debtors' prison
- Offences Against the Person Act 1828
- Bloody Code
- Forfeiture Act 1870
- Capital punishment in the United Kingdom
- C [2009] UKHL 42
- Clingham v RB Kensington and Chelsea [2002] UKHL 39
- Collins v DPP [2006] UKHL 40
- JTB [2009] UKHL 20
- R v K [2001] UKHL 41
- Norris v United States [2008] UKHL 16
- R (Purdy) v DPP [2009] UKHL 45
- R v Rahman [2008] UKHL 45
- GG plc [2008] UKHL 17
- R v Rimmington and Goldstein [2005] UKHL 63
- R v Saik [2006] UKHL 18
- R v Sheldrake [2004] UKHL 43
- Hashnan and Harrup (2000) 30 EHRR 241

== Criminal law elements ==
The two basic elements of a crime are the act of doing that which is criminal, and the intention to carry it out. In Latin this is called the actus reus and the mens rea. In many crimes however, there is no necessity of showing a guilty mind, which is why the term "strict liability" is used.

=== Actus reus ===
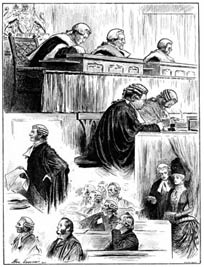
An English court room in 1886, with Lord Chief Justice Coleridge presiding

Actus reus is Latin for "guilty act" and is the physical element of committing a crime. It is usually the application or threat of unlawful force, though exceptionally an omission or failure to act can result in liability. Simple examples might be A hitting B with a stick, or X pushing Y down a water well. These are guilty acts and the unlawful application or force. Alternatively, one may have a pre-existing duty to another person and by deliberately not performing it, one commits a crime. For instance, not giving food is an omission rather than an act, but as a parent one has a duty to feed one's children. Pre-existing duties can arise also through contract, a voluntary undertaking, a blood relation with whom one lives, and occasionally through one's official position. As the 19th century English judge, Lord Coleridge CJ wrote,

It would not be correct to say that every moral obligation involves a legal duty; but every legal duty is founded on a moral obligation.

Furthermore, one can become bound by a duty to take reasonable steps to correct a dangerous situation that one creates. In R v Miller a squatter flicked away a still lit cigarette, which landed on a mattress. He failed to take action, and after the building had burned down, he was convicted of arson. He failed to correct the dangerous situation he created, as he was duty bound to do. In many countries in Europe and North America, Good Samaritan laws also exist, which criminalise failure to help someone in distress (e.g. a drowning child). On the other hand, it was held in the UK that switching off the life support of someone in a persistent vegetative state is an omission to act and not criminal. Since discontinuation of power is not a voluntary act, not grossly negligent, and is in the patient's best interests, no crime takes place.

If someone's act is to have any consequence legally, it must have in some way caused a victim harm. The legal definition of "causation" is that "but for" the defendant's conduct, the victim would not have been harmed. If more than one cause for harm exists (e.g. harm comes at the hands of more than one culprit) the rule states that to be responsible, one's actions must have "more than a slight or trifling link" to the harm. Another important rule of causation is that one must "take his victim as he finds him". For instance, if P gives his friend Q a playful slap on the head, but Q suffers from a rare cranial condition and dies, then P can be guilty of manslaughter regardless of how unlucky he is to have bickered with Q. This is known as the thin skull rule.

Between the defendant's acts and the victim's harm, the chain of causation must be unbroken. It could be broken by the intervening act (novus actus interveniens) of a third party, the victim's own conduct, or another unpredictable event. A mistake in medical treatment usually will not break the chain, unless the mistakes are in themselves "so potent in causing death". For instance, if emergency medics dropped a stab victim on the way to the hospital and performed the wrong resuscitation, the attacker would not be absolved of the crime.

The interplay between causation and criminal responsibility is notoriously difficult, and many outcomes are criticised for their harshness to the unwitting defendant and sidestepping of hospitals' or the victim's own liability. In R v Dear a stab victim reopened his wounds while in the hospital and died. But despite this suicidal behaviour, the attacker was still held fully responsible for murder.

Important cases include:

- R v Holland (1841) 2 Mood. & R. 351 break in causal chain
- R v Instan (1893) 1 QB 450 duty of care, to not omit to help some dying of gangrene
- R v Smith (Thomas Joseph) [1959] QB, negligence of medics does not stop murder
- R v Hughes [2013] UKSC 56, driver who was not as fault for a crash could not be responsible for others deaths although he was prosecuted for driving without a licence or insurance

=== Mens rea ===
Mens rea is another Latin phrase, meaning "guilty mind". It is the mental element of committing a crime and establishes the element of intent. Together with an actus reus, mens rea forms the bedrock of criminal law, although strict liability offences have encroached on this notion. A guilty mind means intending to do that which harms someone. Intention under criminal law is separate from a person's motive. R v Mohan [1975] 2 All ER 193, intention defined as "a decision to bring about... [the actus reus] no matter whether the accused desired that consequence of his act or not." In the special case of murder, the defendant must have appreciated (i.e. consciously recognised) that either death or serious bodily harm would be the result of his actions. In R v Woolin, a man in a fit of temper threw his three-month-old son onto a wall, causing head injuries from which he died. Although death was certain and the father should have realised, he did not in the least desire that his son be killed or harmed. The English House of Lords sentenced him for manslaughter, but not murder. If a defendant has foresight of death or serious injury the jury may, but is not bound to, find the requisite mens rea.

A lower threshold of mens rea is satisfied when a defendant recognises that some act is dangerous but decides to commit it anyway. This is recklessness. For instance if C tears a gas meter from a wall to get the money inside, and knows this will let flammable gas escape into a neighbour's house, he could be liable for poisoning. This is called "subjective recklessness", though in some jurisdictions "objective recklessness" qualifies as the requisite criminal intent, so that if someone ought to have recognised a risk and nevertheless proceeded, he may be held criminally liable. A novel aspect of the law on intention is that if one intends to harm somebody, it matters not who is actually harmed through the defendant's actions. The doctrine of transferred malice means, for instance, that if a man strikes another with his belt, but the belt bounces off and hits a nearby woman, the man is guilty of battery toward her. Malice can also be general, so that terrorists who plant bombs to kill random people are certainly guilty.

The final requirement states that both an actus reus and a mens rea coincide. For instance, in R v Church, For instance, Mr. Church had a fight with a woman which rendered her unconscious. He attempted to revive her, but gave up, believing her to be dead. He threw her, still alive, in a nearby river, where she drowned. The court held that Mr. Church was not guilty of murder (because he did not ever desire to kill her), but was guilty of manslaughter. The "chain of events", his act of throwing her into the water and his desire to hit her, coincided. In this manner, it does not matter when a guilty mind and act coincide, as long as at some point they do.

Important cases include:

- R v Steane [1947] KB 997, defective intent to help the Nazis, by doing radio broadcasts, rather than help family
- Fagan v Metropolitan Police Commissioner [1969] 1 QB 439
- R v Parker [1977] 1 WLR 600
- R v Heard [2007] EWCA Crim 125
- R v Faulkner (1877) 13 Cox CC 550 mens rea for one act does not transfer to others

=== Strict liability ===
Not all crimes have a mens rea requirement, or the threshold of culpability required may be reduced. For example, it might be sufficient to show that a defendant acted negligently, rather than intentionally or recklessly. In offences of absolute liability, other than the prohibited act, it may not be necessary to show anything at all, even if the defendant would not normally be perceived to be at fault.

England and Wales has strict liability offences, which criminalise behaviour without the need to show a criminal mens rea. Most strict liability offences are created by statute, and often they are the result of ambiguous drafting. They are usually regulatory in nature, where the result of breach could have particularly harmful results. An example is drunk driving.

Important cases include:

- R v Woodrow (1846) 15 M&W 404 selling impure food, strict liability, overturning R v Dixon (1814) 3 M. & S. 11 that required mens rea
- R v Stephens (1866) LR 1 QB 702 strict liability for dumping refuse into a river, despite the defendant (ostensibly) having no knowledge
- Betts v Armstead (1888) LR 20 QBD 771
- Fitzpatrick v Kelly (1873) LR 8 QB 337 food safety
- Sweet v Parsley [1970] AC 132 mens rea needed for liability for cannibis being smoked on premises, statutory construction presumes a mens rea
- R v Lambert [2001] UKHL 37, cocaine possession claiming no knowledge
- Road Traffic Act 1988 s 3ZB

=== Complicity and inchoate liability ===
Where an offence has not yet been completed or has been committed by another individual, a person may still be liable for attempting an offence or assisting another in the commission of an offence. Such behaviour includes complicity, attempt, conspiracy, and incitement. Strictly speaking, complicity is found under the umbrella of "accomplice liability" which the court has found to be distinct from the matter of "inchoate liability", this had caused some confusion due to the similarities between aiding and abetting a crime and conspiring to commit a crime. The Serious Crime Act 2007 abolished the common law offence of incitement, however incitement exists in relation to particular offences under other statutes.

==== Complicity ====
Although a person cannot normally be held criminally liable for their inactions (however, see: Omissions in English criminal law), the law avoids this issue by finding that a person is complicit in a crime when he encourages or assists the perpetrator in its commission. Under s 8 of the Accessories and Abettors Act 1861, a person complicit in a crime was once referred to as an "accessory", although this term is now antiquated in England & Wales and is more common in the US legal system. Today the crime is found in three offences under Part 2 of the Serious Crime Act 2007:

- s 44 Intentionally encouraging or assisting an offence;
- s 45 Encouraging or assisting an offence believing it will be committed; and
- s 46 Encouraging or assisting offences believing one or more will be committed.

==== Attempt ====
Historically, the view was that where no harm was done there was no crime to be punished. This perspective changed and instead it was recognised that going beyond mere contemplation and committing an act with intention of committing a crime could in itself be a crime:

“So long as an act rests in bare intention it is not punished by our laws, but immediately when an act is done, the law judges, not only of the act done, but of the intent with which it is done, and if it is coupled with an unlawful and malicious intent, though the act itself would otherwise have been innocent, the intent being criminal, the act becomes criminal and punishable.” - Per Lord Mansfield (1784).

Criminal attempts were codified by the Criminal Attempts Act 1981. Section 1 of the Act states that a person is guilty of attempting an offence when he does an act which is more than merely preparatory to the commission of an offence. Section 4 prescribes that the penalty for attempting an offence shall be the same as if it had been committed.

==== Conspiracy ====
While criminal attempt requires that some action is taken with intention of committing a crime, conspiracy requires no more than agreement to commit a crime between two or more people. The justification for this seems to be that agreeing to commit an offence is a decisive step in its completion. The Criminal Law Act 1977 abolished most forms of common law conspiracy save for conspiracy to defraud and conspiracy to corrupt public morals. Under section 1(b) of the Act, it is immaterial if it would be impossible to actually commit the offence, however the defence of impossibility remains where the offence is charged at common law.

==== Incitement ====
Incitement now exists only in relation to a small number of offences specified by statute. Examples of these include:

- Offences Against the Person Act 1861 s 4 - Conspiring or soliciting to commit murder
- Misuse of Drugs Act 1971 s 19 - Attempts etc. to commit offences (of which references to attempt were repealed, leaving only incitement)
- Sexual Offences Act 2003 s 10 - Causing or inciting a child to engage in sexual activity

=== Corporate crime ===
Serious torts and fatal injuries occur as a result of actions by company employees, have increasingly been subject to criminal sanctions. All torts committed by employees in the course of employment will attribute liability to their company even if acting wholly outside authority, so long as there is some temporal and close connection to work. It is also clear that acts by directors become acts of the company, as they are "the very ego and centre of the personality of the corporation". But despite strict liability in tort, civil remedies are in some instances insufficient to provide a deterrent to a company pursuing business practices that could seriously injure the life, health and environment of other people. Even with additional regulation by government bodies, such as the Health and Safety Executive or the Environment Agency, companies may still have a collective incentive to ignore the rules in the knowledge that the costs and likelihood of enforcement is weaker than potential profits. Criminal sanctions remain problematic, for instance if a company director had no intention to harm anyone, no mens rea, and managers in the corporate hierarchy had systems to prevent employees committing offences. One step toward reform is found in the Corporate Manslaughter and Corporate Homicide Act 2007. This creates a criminal offence for manslaughter, meaning a penal fine of up to 10 per cent of turnover against companies whose managers conduct business in a grossly negligent fashion, resulting in deaths. Without lifting the veil there remains, however, no personal liability for directors or employees acting in the course of employment, for corporate manslaughter or otherwise. The quality of a company's accountability to a broader public and the conscientiousness of its behaviour must rely also, in great measure, on its governance.

Important statutes include:

- Criminal Finances Act 2017
- Proceeds of Crime Act 2002

== Criminal offences and key cases ==
The totality of offences under the criminal justice system of England & Wales numbers in the thousands, however, some of the most common or most serious include:

=== Homicide ===
==== In Statute ====
- Homicide Act 1957 ss 2-4
- Infanticide Act 1938 s 1
- Road Traffic Act 1988 s 143

==== In Case Law ====
- Attorney General's Reference (No 3 of 1994) [1998] AC 245
- R (Nicklinson) v Ministry of Justice [2014] UKSC 34
- R v Adams [1957] Crim LR 365
- R v Adomako [1994] UKHL 6, elements of gross negligence manslaughter
- R v Ahluwalia [1992] EWCA Crim 1, loss of control as a defence, domestic violence situations
- R v Brennan [2014] EWCA Crim 2387
- R v Dear [1996] Crim LR 595, chain of causation
- R v Golds [2016] UKSC 61
- R v Hancock [1985] UKHL 9, foresight needed for murder
- R v Wallace (1931) 23 Cr App R 32 murder conviction overturned for being unreasonable
- R v Woollin [1999] 1 AC 82

=== Non-fatal offences against the person ===
==== In Statute ====
- Domestic Abuse Act 2021 ss 71, consent to serious harm for sexual gratification not a defence
- Mental Capacity Act 2005 ss 2-3
- Offences Against the Person Act 1861
- Protection from Harassment Act 1997 ss 1-4
- Serious Crime Act 2007

==== In Case Law ====
- R v Brown [1993] UKHL 19, consent not a defence to Actual Bodily Harm or Grievous Bodily Harm for sexual pleasure
- R v Colohan [2001] EWCA Crim 1251
- R v Coney (1882) 8 QBD 534, bare knuckle fight with consent still assault and actual bodily harm
- R v Constanza [1997] 2 Cr App Rep 492, meaning of assault, need not be immediate
- R v Savage [1992] UKHL 1, mens rea for assault
- R v Wilson (Alan) [1997] QC 47

=== Sexual offences ===
==== In Statute ====
- Sexual Offences Act 1956
- Sexual Offences Act 2003
- Protection from Harassment Act 1997 ss 1-4

==== In Case Law ====
- R (F) v DPP [2013] EWHC 945
- R v B [2013] EWCA Crim 823
- R v Bowden [2000] 2 All ER 418, child pornography
- R v Bree [2007] EWCA Crim 804
- R v Evans and McDonald [2012] EWCA Crim 2559, rape verdict overturned
- R v McNalley [2013] EWCA Crim 1051
- R v Oluboja [1982] QC 320
- R v Peacock [2012] conviction quashed under the Obscene Publications Act 1959 for hardcore pornography
- R v Penguin Books Ltd DH Lawrence, Lady Chatterley's Lover (1960) and the Obscene Publications Act 1959
- R v Prince (1875) LR 2 CCR 154 responsibility for underage sex even though belief girl was 18, not 14
- R v R [1991] UKHL 12 a husband can be convicted of raping wife

=== Theft, handling, and robbery ===
==== In Statute ====
- Theft Act 1968
- Theft Act 1978

==== In Case Law ====
- Haughton v Smith [1975] AC 476, no crime of handling when goods not stolen
- Ivey v Genting Casinos [2017] UKSC 67, although not a criminal case, Ivey unified the civil and criminal tests for dishonesty
- Oxford v Moss (1979) 68 Cr App Rep 183, information could not be property
- R v Barton and Booth [2020] EWCA Crim 575, resolved dispute about applicability of Ivey
- R v Bloxham [1983] AC 109
- R v Collins [1973] QB 100, entering as a trespasser for burglary
- R v Garwood [1987] Crim LR 476
- R v Gomez [1993] AC 442
- R v Hale [1979] Crim LR 596
- R v Hall [1973] 1 QB 126
- R v Hayes [2015] EWCA Crim 1944
- R v Hinks [2000] UKHL 53 meaning of "appropriates"
- R v Lawrence v Metropolitan Police Commissioner [1972] AC 262, appropriation of property, taxi cab
- R v Marshall [1998] 2 Cr App R 282, meaning of 'permanently deprive'
- R v Morris; Anderton v Burnside [1984] UKHL, 1 meaning of "appropriates"

=== Burglary ===
==== In Statute ====
- Theft Act 1968

==== In Case Law ====
- B and S v Leathley [1979] Crim LR 314, structures that may be buildings
- Norfolk Constabulary v Seekings and Gould [1986] Crim LR 167, structures that are not buildings
- R v Brown [1985] Crim LR 212, 'effective entry', not to be confused with consent to harm case R v Brown [1993] UKHL 19
- R v Collins [1973] QB 100
- R v Jones & Smith [1975] 1 WLR 672, meaning of 'as a trespasser'
- R v Walkington [1979] 2 All ER 716, meaning of 'part of a building'

=== Criminal damage ===
==== In Statute ====
- Computer Misuse Act 1990
- Criminal Damage Act 1971
- Crime and Disorder Act 1998 s 30

==== In Case Law ====
- Morphitis v Salmon (1989) 154 JP 365, defined damage to mean "permenent [sic] or temporary impairment of value or usefulness"
- R v Caldwell [1982] AC 341
- R v G [2003] UKHL 50, subjective recklessness standard abolishing Caldwell recklessness
- R v Hill and Hall (1989) 89 Cr App R 74
- R v Steer [1987] UKHL

=== Fraud and blackmail ===
==== In Statute ====
- Fraud Act 2006
- Theft Act 1968 s 17 (false accounting), s 21 (blackmail)

==== In Case Law ====
- R v Ames [2023] EWCA Crim 1463, unnecessary for jury to determine which intention (make gain or cause loss)
- R v Chaytor [2010] UKSC 52, false accounting for Parliamentary expenses, no privilege protection
- R v Clear [1968] 1 QB 670
- R v Garwood [1987] 1 All ER 1032
- R v Ingram [2003] EWCA Crim, cheating by coughing to win Who wants to be a millionaire
- R v Kylsant [1931] falsifying Royal Mail trading prospectus
- R v Lambert [2009] EWCA Crim 2860
- R v Valujevs [2014] EWCA Crim 2888
- Treacy v DPP [1971] AC 537, blackmail via letter is committed when letter is sent and not when it is received

=== Offences against the state ===
==== In Statute ====
- Forgery and Counterfeiting Act 1981
- Official Secrets Act 1911
- Official Secrets Act 1989
- Public Order Act 1986
- Public Order Act 2023
- Terrorism Act 2000
- Terrorism Act 2006
- Treason Act 1351
- Treason Act 1842

==== In Case Law ====
- Attorney General v Blake [2001] 1 AC 268
- DPP v Eastburn [2023] EWHC 1063 (Admin)
- Hicks v DPP [2023] EWHC 1089 (Admin)
- Joyce v DPP [1946] AC 347
- Reay v Chief Constable of Northumbria [2020] EWHC 3246 (Admin)
- Redmond-Bate v DPP [2000] HRLR 249
- R v Casement [1917] 1 KB 98
- R v Gul [2012] EWCA Crim 280
- R (on the application of Ammori) v Secretary of State for the Home Department [2025] EWCA Civ 1311
- R v Secretary of State for the Home Department Ex p Brind [1991] 1 AC 696
- R v Z [2005] 2 AC 645

=== Inchoate offences ===
==== In Statute ====
- Criminal Attempts Act 1981
- Criminal Law Act 1977
- Serious Crime Act 2007
- Offences Against the Person Act 1861 s 4 soliciting murder

==== In Case Law ====
- R v Shivpuri [1986] UKHL 2, reversing Anderton v Ryan [1985] AC 560 attempting the impossible
- R v Anderson [1986] AC 27
- R v Betts and Ridley (1930) 22 Cr App R, accessory to crime need not be present
- R v Clarkson (1971) 55 Cr. App. Rep. 445, for aiding and abetting requires evidence of actually encouraging a crime
- R v Gnango [2011] UKSC 59, joint enterprise
- R v Jogee [2016] UKSC 8, joint enterprise in a stabbing, need to act or encourage an offence
- R v Reed [1982] Crim. L.R. 819, suicide pact conspiracy
- R v Richards [1974] 1 QB 776, accomplice cannot be convicted of worse offence than the main actor even if he has the mens rea for one
- Wai Yu-tsang v R [1992] 1 AC 269
- R v Stracusa (1990) 90 Cr App R 340
- R v Sadique [2013] EWCA Crim 1150

== Criminal defences ==
The defences which are available to any given offence depend on the wording of the statute and rules of the common law. There are general defences. Insanity, automatism, mistake and self defence operate as defences to any offence. Inadvertence due to intoxication is a defence to all offences requiring proof of basic intent if the intoxication is involuntary, and in cases where the risk would not have been obvious to a reasonable and sober person and/or the defendant, if it is voluntary, and to offences that require proof of a specific intent. Duress and necessity operate as a defence to all crimes except murder, attempted murder and some forms of treason. Marital coercion is a defence to all crimes except treason and murder.

- Connolly v DPP [2007] EWHC 237 (Admin) no Human Rights Act 1998 defence for sending graphic pictures of abortions, considered malicious
- Director of Public Prosecutions v Camplin [1978] UKHL 2, provocation, now Coroners and Justice Act 2009 loss of control
- R v Oye [2013] EWCA Crim 1725
- R v Quayle [2005] EWCA Crim 1415
- R v Martin (Anthony) [2001] EWCA Crim 2245
- R v Coley [2013] EWCA Crim 223
- Re A [2001] 2 WLR 480
- R v Hitchens [2011] EWCA Crim 1626
- R v Howe [1987] AC 417
- R v Ray (Steven)' [2017] EWCA Crim 1391

=== Partial defences to murder ===
There are two main partial defences that reduce murder to manslaughter.

If one succeeds in being declared "not guilty by reason of insanity" then the result is going to an asylum, a clearly inadequate result for somebody suffering from occasional epileptic fits, and many conditions unrecognised by nineteenth century medicine. The law has therefore been reformed in many ways. One important reform, introduced in England and Wales by statute is the diminished responsibility defence. The requirements are usually more lax, for instance, being "an abnormality of mind" which "substantially impair[s] mental responsibility for his acts and omission in doing or being a party to the killing."

Loss of control may be pleaded under sections 54 and 55 of the Coroners and Justice Act 2009.

Infanticide now operates as a defence to both murder and manslaughter. See the Infanticide Act 1938 as amended by the Coroners and Justice Act 2009.

=== Insanity ===
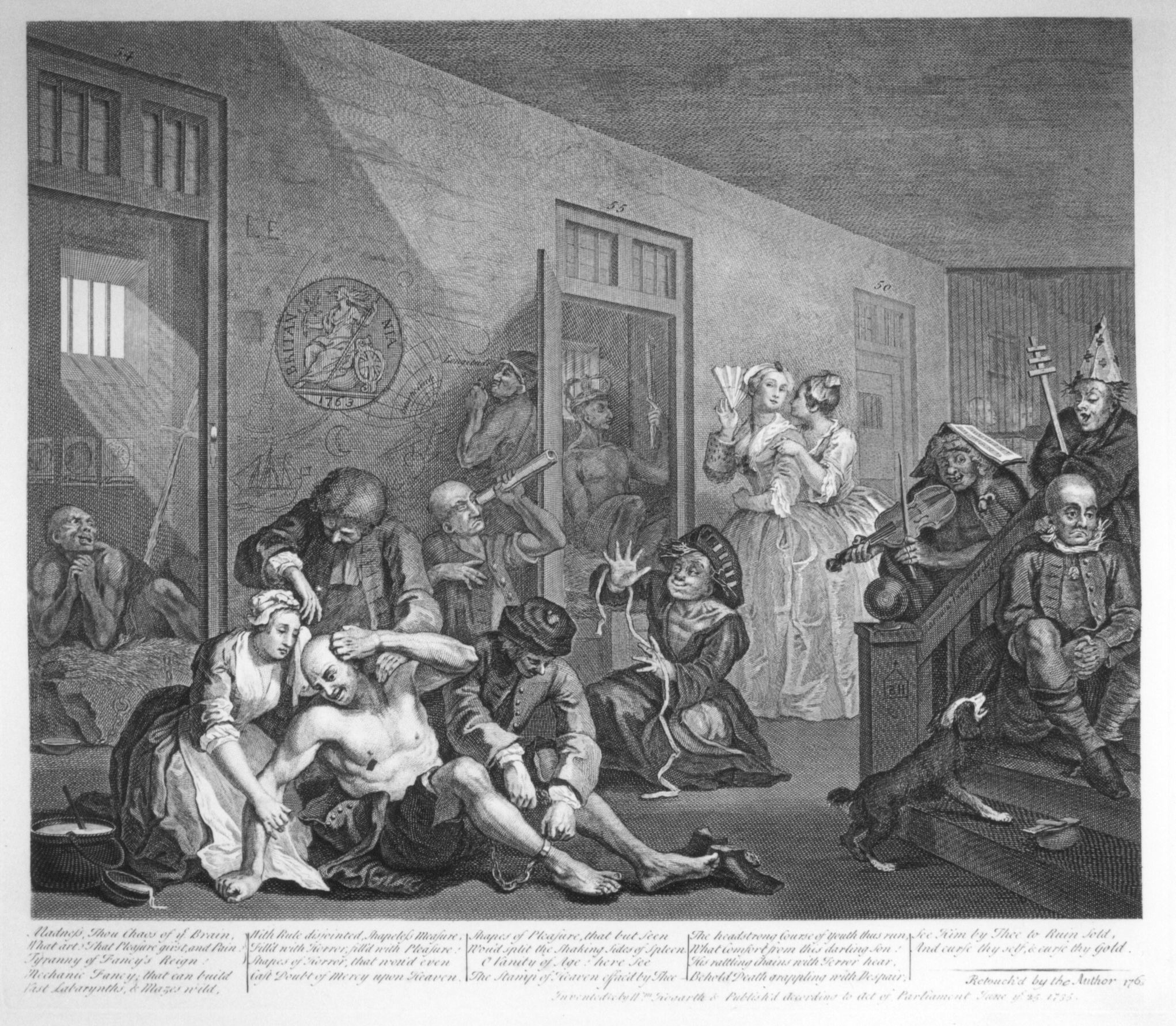
William Hogarth's A Rake's Progress, depicting the world's oldest psychiatric hospital, Bethlem Hospital

Insanity is a deranged state of mind, and consequently no defence to strict liability crimes, where mens rea not is a requirement. An old case which lays down typical rules on insanity is M'Naghten's case where a man suffering extreme paranoia believed the Tory party of the United Kingdom, were persecuting him. He wanted to shoot and kill Prime Minister Sir Robert Peel, but got Peel's secretary in the back instead. Mr M'Naghten was found to be insane, and instead of prison, put in a mental hospital. The case produced the rules that a person is presumed to be sane and responsible, unless it is shown that (1) he was labouring under such a defect of reason (2) from disease of the mind (3) as not to know the nature and quality of the act he was doing, or if he did know it, that he did not know he was doing what was wrong. These elements must be proven present on the balance of probabilities.

"Defect of reason" means much more than, for instance, absent mindedness making a lady walk from a supermarket without paying for a jar of mincemeat. A "disease of the mind" includes not just brain diseases, but any impairment "permanent or transient and intermittent" so long as it is not externally caused (e.g. by drugs) and it has some effect on one's mind. So epilepsy can count, as can an artery problem causing temporary loss of consciousness (and a man to attack his wife with a hammer). Diabetes may cause temporary "insanity" and even sleep walking has been deemed "insane". "Not knowing the nature or wrongness of an act" is the final threshold which confirms insanity as related to the act in question. In R v Windle a man helped his wife commit suicide by giving her a hundred aspirin. He was in fact mentally ill, but as he recognised what he did and that it was wrong by saying to police "I suppose they will hang me for this", he was found not insane and guilty of murder.

=== Automatism ===
Automatism is a state where the muscles act without any control by the mind, or with a lack of consciousness. A successful automatism defence negatives the actus reus element of a crime. If someone raises this defence, then it is for the prosecution to disprove. Automatismic actions can be a product of insanity, or not. One may suddenly fall ill, into a dream like state as a result of post traumatic stress, or even be "attacked by a swarm of bees" and go into an automatic spell. However to be classed as an "automaton" means there must have been a total destruction of voluntary control, which does not include a partial loss of consciousness as the result of driving for too long.

Automatism can also be self-induced, particularly by taking medical treatment. Self-induced automatism can always be a defence to crimes of specific intent (such as murder, wounding or causing grievous bodily harm with intent, theft, robbery and burglary). But automatism is no defence to other crimes (i.e. of basic intent, e.g. manslaughter, assault and battery) if the defendant was reckless in becoming automatismic or it happens through alcohol or illegal drugs. Only where the defendant does not know his actions will lead to an automatismic state where he could harm something can self-induced automatism be a defence to these crimes. For example, in R v Hardie Mr Hardie took his girlfriend's Valium, because she had just kicked him out and he was depressed. She encouraged him to take them, to make him feel better. But he got angry and set fire to the wardrobe. It was held that he should not be convicted of arson because he expected the Valium to calm him down, and this was its normal effect.

Important cases include:

- Hill v Baxter [1958] 1 QB 277, dangerous driving, when automatism possible

=== Intoxication ===
Technically, intoxication is not a defence, but negates the mens rea for specific intent offences (e.g. it commutes a murder sentence to manslaughter). In other words, a defendant may have been so drunk, or drugged, that he was incapable of forming the criminal intention required. Voluntary intoxication is considered reckless, a state of basic intent, which means one cannot have one's sentence reduced for crimes of basic intent (e.g. manslaughter, assault, etc.). So for instance, in R v Sheehan and Moore two people threw petrol on a homeless person and set fire to him. They were cleared of murder, but were still convicted of manslaughter, since that is a crime of basic intent. Of course, it can well be the case that someone is not drunk enough to support any intoxication defence at all. On the other hand, if someone becomes involuntarily intoxicated, because his drink is laced or spiked, then the question is whether the normal mens rea was present at the incident's time. So where a blackmailer drugged a man's coffee, invited him to abuse a 15-year-old boy, and photographed it, the man was denied the defence of intoxication because the court simply did not believe that the man did not intend to commit the abuse.

Sometimes intoxicated people make mistakes, as in R v Lipman where the defendant took LSD, thought his girlfriend was a snake and strangled her. Here, intoxication operated as a defence because Mr Lipman was mistaken in his specific intent of killing a snake. But intoxication does not negate the basic intent crime of manslaughter, with his "reckless course of conduct" in taking drugs. Lastly, while a mistake about a person or the actual action is acceptable, a mistake about how much force to use to defend oneself is not. Using a sledgehammer to fend off an "attacker" after 20 pints of beer is disproportionate.

Important cases include:

- R v O'Grady [1987] QB 995 voluntary intoxication

=== Mistake ===
Important cases include:

- Williams (Gladstone) [1987] 3 All ER 411, mistake of fact depends on reasonableness

=== Self defence ===
In all instances one may only use reasonable, and not excessive, force in self defence. In R v Clegg a soldier in Northern Ireland shouted at a car approaching a checkpoint to halt. When it did not, Mr Clegg fired three shots, killing a woman. She was hit in the back, and Mr Clegg was sentenced for murder because by then the car had passed, the force was excessive and there was no justification for self-defence. Another way of expressing the rule on defensive force is that it must be proportionate to the threat. For instance, as the notorious case of R v Martin shows, shooting a teenager in the back with a shotgun several times as he tries to escape is not a justified or proportionate exercise of self-defensive force for the Norfolk farmer, even if robbers had trespassed on his property. In that case, Mr Martin was found to have diminished responsibility for his actions, because he was mentally ill.

=== Duress ===
One who is "under duress" is forced into something. Duress can be a defence for all crimes, except murder, attempted murder, being an accessory to murder and treason involving the death of the Sovereign. In R v Howe it was held that to allow the defence of duress as a defence to murder would, in the words of Lord Hailsham, withdraw the protection of the criminal law from the innocent victim and cast the cloak of its protection upon the coward and the poltroon - ordinary people ought to be prepared to give up their lives to the person making the threat in preference to killing an innocent. R v Gotts, in a similar fashion, disallowed the defence of duress for someone charged with attempted murder, as the Lords could not see a reason why the defence should be open to an attempted murderer when it was not open to a murderer.

In order to prove duress, it must be shown that the defendant was induced by threats of death or serious physical injury to either himself or his family that he reasonably believed would be carried out and that also that "a sober person of reasonable firmness, sharing the characteristics of the accused" would have responded in the same way. Examples of someone's characteristics that might be relevant are age, gender, pregnancy, physical disability, mental illness, sexuality, but not IQ.

Using duress as a defence is limited in a number of ways. The accused must not have foregone some safe avenue of escape. The duress must have been an order to do something specific, so that one cannot be threatened with harm to repay money and then choose to rob a bank to repay it, because that choice implies free will. Intoxication is irrelevant to duress, but one cannot also say one is mistaken about duress, when intoxicated. Then a number of cases turn on the choice to join a gang, and inevitably do bad things. The rule is that where one is aware of the gang's nature and puts himself in a position where he could be threatened, duress is not a defence - joining a gang that carries out armed robberies probably precludes any duress defence but joining a gang that is not violent at the time of joining may not.

Important cases include:

- R v Hasan [2005] UKHL 22, duress, threat of serious injury

=== Necessity ===
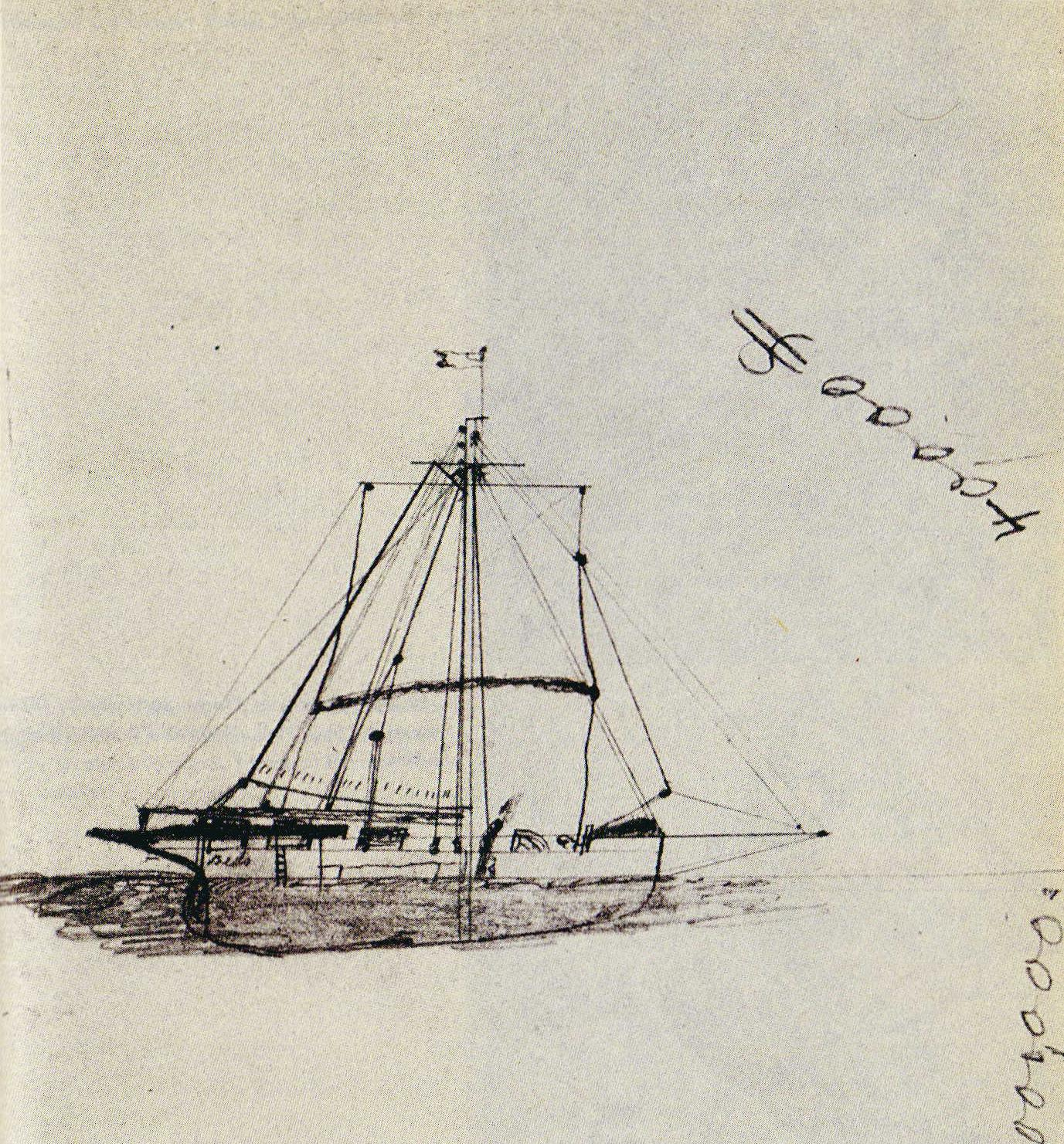
Sketch of the Mignonette by Tom Dudley from R v Dudley and Stephens

Whilst a duress defence relates to the situation where a person commits an offence to avoid death or serious injury to himself or another when threatened by a third party, the defence of necessity related to the situation where a person commits an offence to avoid harm which would ensue from circumstances in which he/she or another are placed. Duress operates as an excuse but necessity operates as a justification, rendering the defendant's conduct lawful. Necessity is a defence that argues "I desperately needed to do X, because consequence Y would have been really bad." Logically, this is identical to the concept of "duress of circumstance", where the situation rather than a person is the threat. The common elements are (1) an act is done to prevent a greater evil (2) the evil must be directed to the defendant or someone for who he is responsible (3) the act must have been a proportionate response. But only necessity is a potential defence for murder.

The defence of necessity was first tested in the 19th century English case of R v Dudley and Stephens. The Mignotte, sailing from Southampton to Sydney, sank. Three crew members and a cabin boy were stranded on a raft. They were starving and the cabin boy close to death. Driven to extreme hunger, the crew killed and ate the cabin boy. The crew survived and were rescued, but put on trial for murder. They argued it was necessary to kill the cabin boy to preserve their own lives. Lord Coleridge, expressing immense disapproval, ruled, "to preserve one's life is generally speaking a duty, but it may be the plainest and the highest duty to sacrifice it." The men were sentenced to hang, but public opinion, especially among seafarers, was outraged and overwhelmingly supportive of the crew's right to preserve their own lives. In the end, the Crown commuted their sentences to six months.

Since then, in the 1970s, in several road traffic cases, although obiter dicta, it has been stated that there is a defence of necessity. In Johnson v Phillips [1975], Justice Wein stated that a police constable would be entitled to direct motorists to disobey road traffic regulations if this was reasonably necessary for the protection of life or property. In a later case, Woods v Richards, Justice Eveleigh stated that the defence of necessity depended on the degree of emergency which existed or the alternative danger to be averted. In DPP v Harris a police officer, charged with driving without due care and attention through a red traffic light contrary to s 3 of the Road Traffic Act 1988, and having collided with another vehicle containing armed robbers whilst pursuing that vehicle, was not allowed to advance the defence of necessity. Again in Chicon v DPP [1994] the defence of necessity was not allowed in a case of a pit bull terrier dog being kept in a public place without a muzzle - the owner had removed the muzzle to allow the dog to drink. But in the case of In re F (Mental Patient Sterilization), the defence of necessity was allowed. In the case of R v Bournewood Community and Mental Health NHS Trust, the defence of necessity (in the case of Tort law) was recognised and applied by the House of Lords to justify the informal detention and treatment of a mentally incompetent person who had become a danger to himself. This approach was subsequently found to be a violation of Article 5 of the European Convention of Human Rights by the European Court of Human Rights in HL v United Kingdom. Subsequent to this decision, individuals who lack capacity must be deprived of their liberty in accordance with the Deprivation of Liberty Safeguards (an amendment to the Mental Capacity Act 2005), not under the common law doctrine of necessity.

But more recently, duress of circumstance and necessity have been recognised and used by courts. In a leading case, Re A (Conjoined Twins), conjoined twins were born, one reliant on the other for her heart and lungs. Unless they were separated, both would die, but if separated, the reliant twin would die, the doctors therefore being liable to prosecution for murder. It was, however, held that in this special and incredibly sensitive situation, that the separation was necessary to save the first twin's life.

== Procedure ==
Criminal cases in England and Wales are usually brought by the Crown Prosecution Service, with the crown acting as the prosecuting party. (Case names reflect this: a case against Mr Smith would be styled R v Smith, with R being short for Rex or Regina, that is, the King or Queen, and the v standing for "versus".) Private prosecutions are possible but rare (outside some specific niches), but have attracted some controversy—e.g. the failed private prosecution following the murder of Stephen Lawrence, and their abuse in the Post Office scandal.

The venue for a trial is determined by the class of offence. Summary offences are heard in Magistrates' Court either by a district judge or a lay magistrate. Indictable offences must be heard by a judge and jury in Crown Court. Some offences are triable either way, meaning it can be heard in either the Magistrates' Court, or the Crown Court if the magistrate sends it to the Crown Court or the defendant opts for trial on indictment.

In all criminal trials, there are a number of procedural protections for defendants, stemming from both common law and the obligations of the European Convention on Human Rights, particularly Article 6. These include the presumption of innocence (as expounded in the 1935 case of Woolmington v DPP), the right to silence (although qualified by the adverse inference that can be drawn under provisions of the Criminal Justice and Public Order Act 1994), and the qualified rule against double jeopardy (under the Criminal Justice Act 2003, a second trial after a not guilty verdict can only occur when authorised by the Court of Appeal).

The fairness of trials is also supported by limits on admissibility of evidence. Hearsay evidence can only be admitted if it satisfies one or more statutory gateways for admissibility. Judges have the power both at common law and under section 78 of the Police and Criminal Evidence Act 1984 to exclude evidence when introducing it will have "an adverse effect on the fairness of proceedings". They also have a power under section 76 to exclude a confession when made under conditions of oppression or circumstances that would induce unreliability.

Important cases and sources concerning criminal procedure include:

- Rice v Connolly [1966] 2 QB 414, right to refuse to answer questions if not under arrest
- Judges' Rules (1912), adverse inferences not to be drawn from silence before arrest. The rule was already long established at common law in relation to silence during trial; both rules were weakened by the Criminal Justice and Public Order Act 1994
- R v Waterfield [1963] 3 All E.R. 659 police power to stop and detain, an assault charge against an officer was invalid as the officer was not acting in execution of duty
- R v Cheshire [1991] 1 WLR 844 role of the jury in finding causation
- R v Wang [2005] 1 WLR 661 judge cannot direct a jury to find a guilty verdict
- R v Davis [2008] UKHL 36, witness anonymity
- R v Incedal and Rarmoul-Bouhadjar (2014) terrorism trial not to be held in secret

== Sentencing ==
After the jury or magistrate(s) decide on guilt, the court determine the sentence of an offender. The magistrates' court is limited in the maximum sentence it may impose in a way the Crown Court is not. Both courts must have regard to the sentencing guidelines produced by the Sentencing Council, as well as following the statutory provisions now set out in the Sentencing Act 2020.

The court's power to sentence is contained in the Sentencing Act. It was formerly in section 163 of the Criminal Justice Act 2003.

It was formerly created by each of the following provisions in turn:

- The Criminal Justice Act 1948, section 13. Only applied to felony.
- The Criminal Law Act 1967, section 7(3). Only applied where no enactment specified a maximum fine.
- The Powers of Criminal Courts Act 1973, section 30(1). Amended by the Crime (Sentences) Act 1997, section 55 and Schedule 4, paragraph 8(3). The Criminal Law Act 1977, Schedule 13 repealed "limiting the amount of the amount of the fine that may be imposed or" and see section 32(1) (removed all statutory limits on fines imposed on convictions on indictment). Repealed in part by the Criminal Justice Act 1991, Schedule 13.
- The Powers of Criminal Courts (Sentencing) Act 2000, section 127.

A general power of Crown Court to impose a sentence of imprisonment on conviction on indictment is created by section 77 of the Powers of Criminal Courts (Sentencing) Act 2000

It was formerly created by each of the following provisions in turn:

- The Criminal Law Act 1967, section 7(1)
- The Powers of Criminal Courts Act 1973, section 18(1)

== International criminal law ==
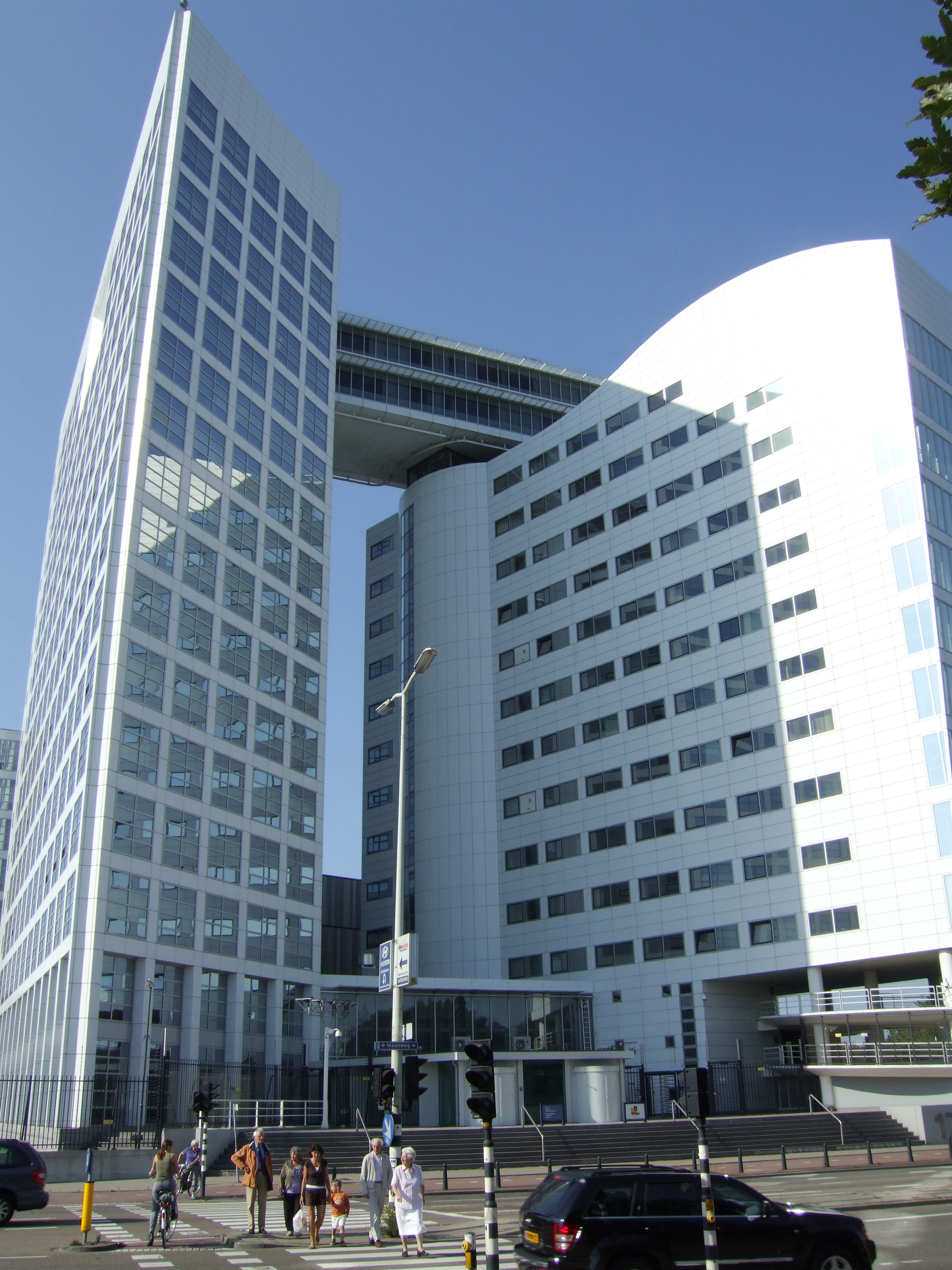
The architecture of the new International Criminal Court in The Hague

== See also ==
- Bibliography of English criminal law, for texts which set out the criminal law of England and Wales
- Crown Prosecution Service
- List of English criminal offences
- Criminal Law Reform Now Network (CLRNN)
- English tort law
- Scottish criminal law
- Northern Irish criminal law
- Lurking doubt
