= R v Dear =

English criminal law case

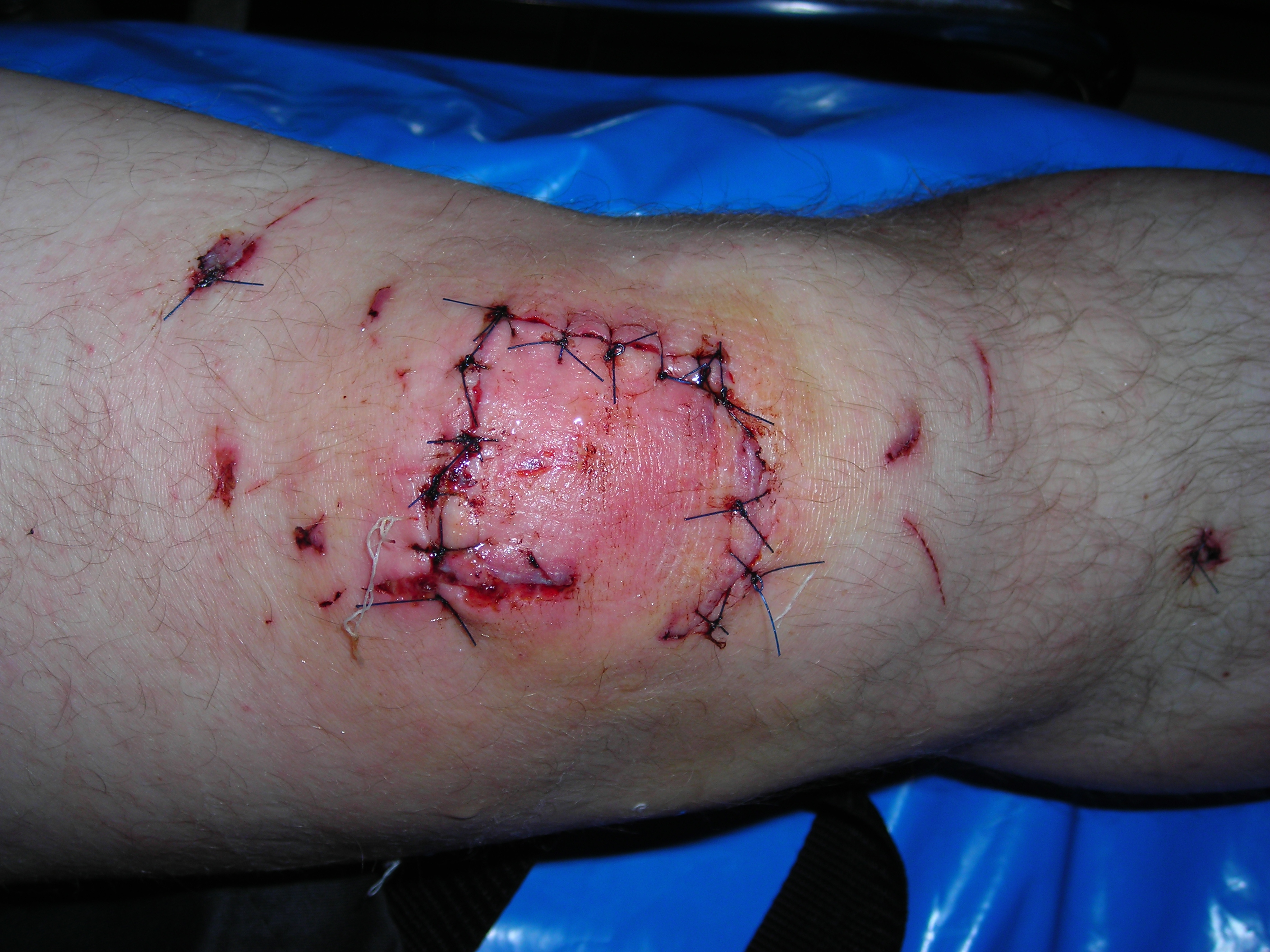
- Court: Court of Appeal
- Full case name: Regina v. Dear
- Decided: 1996
- Citation: [1996] Crim LR 595

Case history
- Prior action: Conviction in the Crown Court (unreported)

Keywords
- Novus actus interveniens; causation; really serious (grievous) bodily harm

R v Dear [1996] is an English criminal law case, dealing with homicide and causation. The court ruled, slightly extending R v Holland, that even if a victim aggravates his wounds sufficiently to cause otherwise avoidable death, the chain of causation is not broken.

== Facts ==
The defendant's 12-year-old daughter stated that the victim had sexually assaulted her, whereupon the defendant took a Stanley knife and slashed the victim repeatedly. The victim, far from healed, died two days later of a sudden blood loss from severe bodily harm wounds. The defendant was charged with murder. The defendant claimed a break in the chain of causation as the victim had committed suicide following the attack, either by deliberately re-opening the wounds which had healed, or by failing to staunch the flow of blood from wounds which had reopened of their own accord. This case shows an example of homicide leading to suicide involving the chain of causation. Where the defendant attacked the victim by stabbing him with a Stanley Knife which gives us the actus reus and the mens rea of the case as the defendant had full intent to stab the victim. There may have also been a possibility that the defendant intent was kill the victim in other words, there could have been murderous intent. Additionally, two days later, the victim died due to blood loss which was the result of the victim reopening his wounds and not stopping the flow of blood leading to his death from blood loss from the reopening of his wounds

== Judgment ==
The Court of Appeal held that the trial judge had directed the jury correctly by telling them that the real question was whether the injuries inflicted by the defendant were an operating and significant cause of the death. Rose L.J. said:

‘It would not be helpful to juries if the law required them to decide causation in a case such as the present by embarking on an analysis of whether a victim had treated himself with mere negligence or gross neglect, the latter breaking but the former not breaking the chain of causation between the defendant's unlawful act and the victim's death.’

The victim's death was caused by bleeding from the artery which the defendant had caused and so the jury were entitled to find that but for the defendant's conduct, the victim would not have died; the defendant made an operative and significant contribution to the death despite the presence of other operating factors.

If, however, the wounds had healed, the position might be different; the element of suicide, reckless or intended, might break the chain of causation. The Court of Appeal opined that if victim had committed suicide because of the defendant's attack on him, then the chain of causation would not be broken. On the other hand, if such an act arose because of shame at which he had done to the defendant's daughter then the chain would have been broken; it would no longer be possible to say that the victim would not have committed suicide but for the defendant's attack on him.

== See also ==
Approved and considered by

- R v Smith (Thomas Joseph) (1959), EWCA
- R v Blaue (1975), EWCA
- R v Cheshire (1991), EWCA
- R v Wallace (2018), EWCA Crim 690
