= Pittwood =

Pittwood might refer to:

- Pittwood, Illinois, an unincorporated community in the United States
- R v Pittwood, a case in English criminal law relating to omissions
