= Omissions in English criminal law =

The omissions of individuals are generally not criminalised in English criminal law, save in many instances of a taking on of a duty of care, having contractual responsibility or clearly negligent creation of a hazard. Many comparator jurisdictions put a general statutory duty on strangers to rescue – this is not so in English law. Defenders and reasoners of the position regard it as wrong for the criminal law to punish people in many circumstances for committing no physical act, which it is argued would be an infringement on human autonomy. Academics arguing for reform argue that a social responsibility to assist others should exist, particularly where there would be no danger to the rescuer.

Liability for omissions has long existed where a pre-existing duty can be established between two parties. For example, where a person accidentally creates a small fire in a flat, they owe a duty to take reasonable steps to extinguish it, or to summon help. A special duty, parental responsibility, exists between parents/guardians and their children, and an omission of these to use best endeavours to save their young child from drowning would result in criminal liability, as it is deemed such a person (and those in loco parentis) should ensure the wellbeing of the child. Other duties may be inferred from contractual obligations. An illustration of this tested in a court of precedent is the liability of any person employed to ensure people do not cross a level crossing over an active track, where abandoning such a post.

== History of omissions ==
"A number of people who stand round a shallow pool in which a child is drowning, and let it drown without taking the trouble to ascertain the depth of the pond, are no doubt, shameful cowards, but they can hardly be said to have killed the child."
The general approach taken to omissions, as outlined by James Fitzjames Stephen, History of Criminal Law (1883), Vol 3, p. 10

The courts were initially reluctant to impose liability for omissions, as demonstrated by the early case of R v Smith, decided in 1869. The facts were that a watchman employed by a railway company took a break from his duties, and in this time a man was killed by an oncoming train. Lush LJ held that whilst an omission could constitute an act of murder, because there was no statutory duty for the railway to provide a watchman, there could not be any criminal liability. However, thirty years later, in the case of R v Pittwood, the court adopted a different stance to a case of similar facts. In this case, a gatekeeper for a railway service in Somerset negligently forgot to close a gate – allowing access by vehicles (horse-drawn) over a level crossing – whilst gone to lunch. It was held that although he was privately employed, he had materially contributed to accident, by opening the gate, then failing to close it. The reasoning used by the courts as in this case can be found as being problematic to establish liability for many omissions. Lord Justice Wright's position was that the watchman's misfeasance contributed to the accident, which would suggest that it was his opening of the gate which was criminalised, rather than his failure to shut it. It has been submitted by John Smith that the judgment implies an acquittal would be possible if the watchman had come on duty to find an open gate and then not shut it, an outcome which Smith describes as "morally offensive".

The decision shows the general reluctance of the 19th century courts of precedent to state, outright, an omission may be criminal save for R v Instan (1893) a case of allowing a relative to die by not continuing feeding them, and it has been said that such attempts to distinguish between acts and omissions are at least unhelpful, and possibly dangerous.

A modern recognition by the House of Lords that a failure to act can result in criminal liability can be found in R v Miller. In this case a squatter occupying a house fell asleep whilst smoking a cigarette, resulting in a small fire starting on his mattress. Rather than putting out the fire, he removed into an adjacent room, and fell asleep, resulting in the house catching fire. The defendant was charged arson, under the Criminal Damage Act 1971. In dismissing his appeal that a failure to act could not generally result in criminal liability, Lord Diplock stated that:

I see no rational ground for excluding from conduct capable of giving rise to criminal liability, conduct which consists of failing to take measures that lie within one's power to counteract a danger that one has oneself created, if at the time of such conduct one's state of mind is such as constitutes a necessary ingredient of the offence.

It is suggested that the principles set out in R v Miller are likely applicable to any instance where an individual, in negligently creating a risk, fails to take steps that any reasonable individual would to avert risk to others. Whilst no general duty would exist for an uninvolved individual to try to stem a fire, or to call the fire brigade, it is the causal link between an individual's actions in creating a risk which result in a duty arising to prevent others from harm.

== Situations creating a duty to act ==
Various situations exist in which the courts will impose a duty to act, generally resulting from a pre-existing relationship or contractual duty. Despite the reluctance of English criminal law to impose liability for omissions, there also exist a number of statutes which create criminal offences for a failure to undertake a certain act, as well as others which have been interpreted to impose liability for a failure to act.

=== Duties arising out of a relationship ===
It has long been held that a parent owes a duty to their child to ensure they do not suffer any unreasonable detriment to health or safety. Thus a parent who omits to feed or properly care for their child may face criminal repercussions for subsequent death or injury. An early example of this principle was given by the case of R v Gibbins & Proctor, where the court ruled that it was so self-evident that it did not require analysis or authority. In upholding convictions for murder resulting from two parent's starvation of their child, Darling J quoted from the earlier case of R v Instan, a case of similar neglect for a vulnerable individual, that:

"There is no case directly in point, but it would be a slur upon, and a discredit to the administration of, justice in this country if there were any doubt as to the legal principle, or as to the present case being within it."

Following R v Gibbins & Proctor, and the passing of the Children and Young Persons Act 1933, it became a criminal offence to neglect a child in a way which would likely cause injury or risk to health. It is still likely however that following the more recent case of R v Stone & Dobinson, a conviction for manslaughter or murder would arise, where the neglect or lack of care by a parent is either intentional, or grossly negligent.

Other instances in which a duty may arise include spousal relationships, and family relations, where they are of sufficient proximity. A recent case affirming a duty to a spouse is R v Hood, where the Court of Appeal upheld a husband's conviction of gross negligence manslaughter, after he failed to summon medical attention for his wife – a sufferer of osteoperosis – after she fell and broke a number of bones. Familial relationships have been found to infer a duty to act where the proximity of the two family members is that of the same household, as shown by the cases of R v Stone & Dobinson and R v Chattaway, where neglect for an elderly sister and a daughter resulted in convictions of murder and manslaughter. Further, in the case of "R v BW & SW (No 3)" the mother of the deceased seven-year-old child was convicted of murder and father of manslaughter where the parents neglected to provide adequate nourishment and medical attention for their child.

=== Contractual duties ===
Where an individual is contracted to perform certain duties, a failure to do so may result in criminal liability. The principle has been an extension of that in Instan (see above); the reasoning included seeing the facts as a quasi-contract of mutual benefit, so as to put a duty upon the defendant to act. As demonstrated by 'R v Pittwood (1902), where a gatekeeper was found criminally liable for failing to perform his duties correctly, this principle may be extended to instances where the injured individual is a third party.

=== Creation of a dangerous situation ===
A clear circumstance where an individual may be found liable for omitting to act is where they create some kind of dangerous situation, which may reasonably put others at risk. In such instances, if the individual is aware that they have created the risk, they are under an obligation to prevent harm from resulting. The principles outlined by Lord Diplock in R v Miller show clearly that there is a duty for risk creators to take any measure that is reasonably within their power, and that a failure to do so will often result in criminal liability. Such duties may also arise where an individual, who is unaware of any risk their conduct creates, becomes aware that they have created a dangerous situation, and then fails to act. Where in Fagan v Metropolitan Police Commissioner a man unintentionally drove onto a policeman's foot, it was his failure to move after he became aware of his conduct that formed the basis for his conviction.

=== Duties arising from statute ===
Where legislation imposes criminal liability for an omission, then the issue is straightforward and the general dislike for omissions liability is displaced. For example, failing to provide a specimen of breath at the roadside is by definition a criminal omission.

== Bibliography ==
- Mead, Geoffrey (1991). "Contracting into Crime: A Theory of Criminal Omissions". Oxford Journal of Legal Studies. 11 (2). Oxford University Press.
- Smith, John (1984). "Liability for omissions in the criminal law". Legal Studies. 4 (1). Blackwell Publishing.
- Ormerod, David (2005). Smith and Hogan Criminal Law. Oxford University Press. ISBN 0-406-97730-5.
- Ashworth, Andrew (1989). "The scope of criminal liability for omissions". Law Quarterly Review. 105 (Jul). Sweet & Maxwell.
