= R v Pear =

Legal case

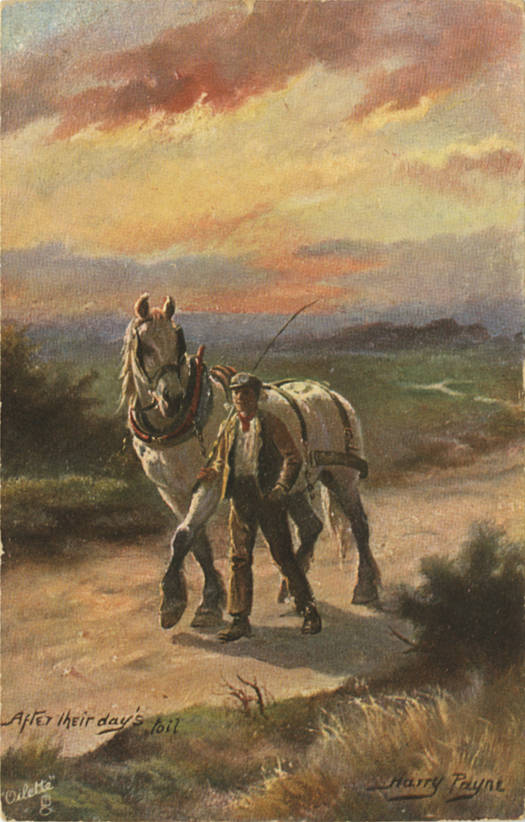
- Full case name: Rex versus (or less formally the King or the Crown against) Mister Pear
- Decided: 1779
- Citation: 1 Leach 211; 168 Eng. Rep. 208 (1799)

Case history
- Subsequent action: none

Keywords
- correct weight to be given to circumstantial, corroboratory evidence; sale of hired good or chattel without right to sell; intention to return hired good or chattel

The King v. Pear (1779) in English criminal law interpreted possession and intent in "larceny by trick". A horse owner gave Pear custody of a horse, renting it out to him for a day, after which it was to be returned when Pear returned to town. Pear did not journey, sold the horse the same day, before the expiration of the rental, and had no confirmed place to lodge in that town which evinced lack of intention to return.

At the time, common law was that if the horse was sold after the rental contract had expired, this was larceny since there was no longer a contract in force for possession. If the renter intended to return the horse, and therefore had legal possession (custody) then was forced to sell it because of unforeseen circumstances, this would be a breach of trust, but would not be felony: larceny. The fact that the renter had no lodging could be used to show a fraudulent criminal intent from the beginning, whereby the act of taking and selling the horse did not transfer legal possession to Pear for the day, and his act of taking and selling the horse was found to be felonious larceny.

The court wrote that the original intention at the time of renting the horse was the critical issue as to whether there was larceny,

"[The Jury was properly left to consider whether] ... there were other circumstances which imported that at the time of the hiring the prisoner had it in intention to sell the horse, as his saying that he lodged at a place where he was not... Whether the prisoner meant at the time of hiring to take such a journey, but was afterwards tempted to sell the horse? For if so he must be acquitted; but if... at the time of the hiring the journey was a mere pretense to get the horse into his possession, and he had no intention to take such a journey but intended to sell the horse... with a fraudulent view and intention of selling it immediately... Whether the delivery of the horse... to the prisoner, had so far changed possession of the property, as to render the subsequent conversion of it a mere breach of trust, or whether the conversion was felonious... the question, as to original intention... had been properly left to the jury; and as they had found, that his view in doing so was fraudulent... [so] had not changed the nature possession... and that the prisoner was therefore guilty of felony [larceny]."
