= R v Stephens =

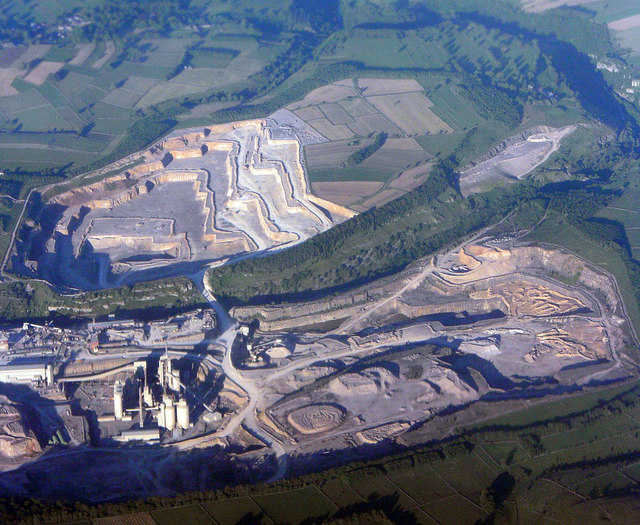
- Court: Queen's Bench Division
- Decided: 14 June 1866
- Citation: LR 1 QB 702, QBD

Court membership
- Judges sitting: Mr Justice Mellor; Mr Justice Blackburn

Keywords
- Master and servant (employer and employee); Master liable on indictment for act of servant; Knowledge of employee imputed to employer

R v Stephens (1866) is an English criminal law, public nuisance in land law and vicarious liability case decided by the Queen's Bench that applied a strict liability standard (that is no requirement of mens rea) to the violation of the criminal statute prohibiting dumping of refuse into a river.

== Facts ==
The defendant owned a quarry where refuse was dumped (by servants, employees, agents, land licensees or subcontractors) into a nearby river. The owner claimed he had no knowledge of the dumping and so should not be liable.

== Judgment ==
The court held the quarry owner as "master" would be liable for acts of his servant, regardless of knowledge. He was convicted and faced the usual financial penalty. The offence was upheld as being one where no knowledge of the dumping was required.

== Considered in ==
- R v Rimmington [2005] UKHL 63; [2006] 1 AC 459; [2005] 3 WLR 982; [2006] 2 All ER 257; [2006] 1 Cr App R 257, HL(E)
- R v Shorrock [1994] QB 279
