= R v Savage =

R v Savage; R v Parmenter
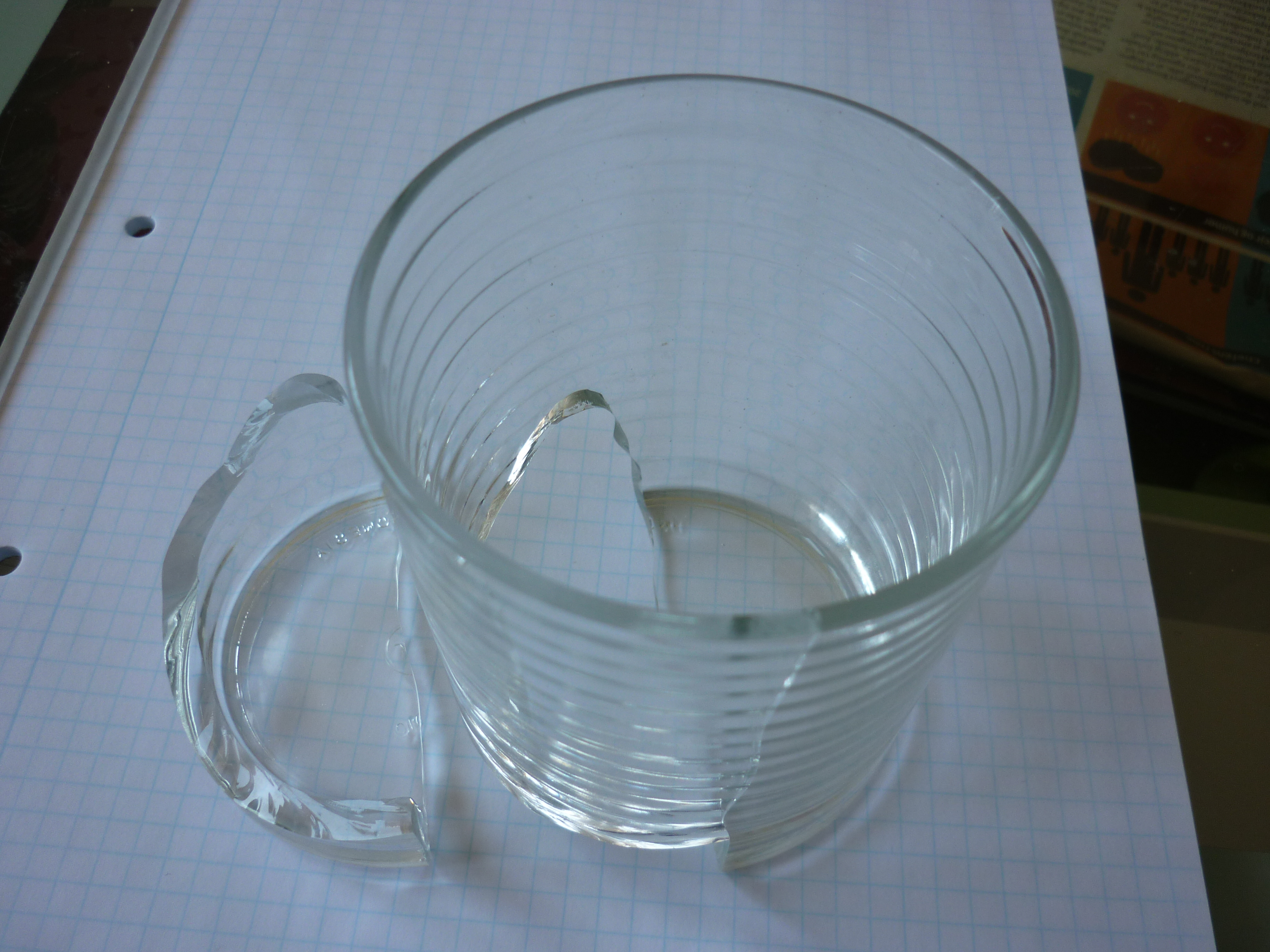
- Court: Judicial Committee of the House of Lords
- Full case name: The Crown and (or very formally Regina versus) Susan Savage; joined appeal in law of The Crown and Philip Mark Parmenter
- Decided: 7 November 1991
- Citation: [1991] UKHL 15, [1992] AC 699, [1992] 4 All ER 698, [1991] 94 Cr App Rep 193, [1991] 94 Cr App R 193, [1992] 1 AC 699

Case history
- Prior actions: Conviction in Crown Court for battery with liquid and for malicious wounding under section 18. Court of Appeal replaced latter conviction with assault occasioning actual bodily harm under section 47.
- Subsequent action: none

Court membership
- Judges sitting: Lord Keith, Lord Brandon, Lord Ackner, Lord Jauncey, Lord Lowry

Case opinions
- Lord Ackner, per curiam. On the proven facts of the case, found by the jury, and their having established the relevant malicious (e.g. violent) act, the severe misdemeanour of wounding with its consequent starting point of sentencing scale was improper, the correct legal classification of the offence was the misdemeanour of assault occasioning actual bodily harm with its lower starting point for sentencing: a verdict of guilty of assault occasioning actual bodily harm is a permissible alternative verdict on a count alleging unlawful wounding contrary to section 20 of the Offences Against the Persons Act 1861. Section 3(2) Criminal Appeals Act 1968 applied.

Keywords
- Assault occasioning actual bodily harm; grievous bodily harm; Assault; accidental aggravation; oblique intention

R v Savage; R v Parmenter [1991] were conjoined final domestic appeals in English criminal law confirming that the mens rea (level and type of guilty intent) of malicious wounding or the heavily twinned statutory offence of inflicting grievous bodily harm will in all but very exceptional cases include that for the lesser offence of assault occasioning actual bodily harm. Both sections of the Offences against the Person Act 1861 (sections 20 versus section 47) only require damage to have resulted from a violent or otherwise malicious act of the defendant. An appellate court may use its statutory power under a 1968 Act to substitute a charge with an appropriate lesser charge.

The latter offence, equally a misdemeanour was held to apply to a precise fact pattern which included pouring one's large glass of drink over someone with the glass slipping and cutting a wrist; and to another which included three month's of rough-handling child cruelty.

== Savage's case ==
=== Facts ===
Susan Savage, threw her pint of beer over Tracey Beal her husband's ex-girlfriend, in a pub, late on 31 March 1989. In doing so the glass slipped from her hand and cut the victim's wrist. She claimed that she had only meant to throw the beer (a very minor battery, often not prosecuted); and that she never foresaw a risk of injury.

=== Jury findings and legal interpretation of fact ===
The jury assessed much testimony (including expert medical witness evidence). They concluded that she had deliberately thrown the beer and recklessly or accidentally but foreseeably (negligently) allowed the glass to slip.

In either case they found no intent, nor imputed intent from all the circumstances (on which legally valid jury instructions were given), to wound or occasion grievous bodily. She was convicted of malicious wounding (under the section not requiring specific intent): section 20 of Offences against the Person Act 1861.

=== Savage's first-level appeal ===
The Court of Appeal quashed the conviction by substituting one under less severe s47 of the Act: Assault occasioning actual bodily harm (common assault occasioning actual bodily harm). It determined, on conflicting authorities, it had the power to do so for these particular, similar offences.

Convicted Savage accepted minor battery with the beer but as to the substantive injury caused she appealed for acquittal or for a retrial to the highest court.

== Parmenter's case ==
=== Facts ===
Philip Parmenter rough-handled his baby son during his first three months and three days. He caused, not realising the extent of vulnerability of babies, suffering and injuries to the boney structures of the legs and right forearm.

=== Guilty plea to child cruelty, other jury findings and legal interpretations ===
He was indicted on eight counts, six represented three-paired alternatives, laid under sections 18 and 20 of the Act (section 18 being the specific intent section) for wounding or grievous bodily harm. The eighth charge, child cruelty, saw a guilty plea. The others (stated) remained countered with he did not realise his rough handling would cause such injury. The jury convicted under the co-offered section 20, rather than 18; for all three occasions (time-linked charges).

=== Parmenter's first-level appeal ===
The appeal hearing—seeking acquittal—was granted. The panel sought a pathway to a lesser offence substitution, i.e. section 47 however could find no clearly permissible one.

The Court of Appeal opined "[Section 20 and section 47] can no longer live together, and that the reason lies in a collision between two ideas, logically and morally sustainable in themselves, but mutually inconsistent, about whether the unforeseen consequences of a wrongful act should be punished according to the intent ([per] R v Cunningham [1957] 2 Q.B. 396) or the consequences ([per] Reg. v. Mowatt [1968] 1 QB 421."). They quashed thus the convictions. They found they could not substitute the lesser offence, per the reasoning given.

The Crown appealed to the highest court against the jury verdict-quashing acquittal.

== Final appeal hearing ==
The court reasoned the offences on identical grounds so heard the appeals together, reaching the same outcome. It gave a long reasoned judgment to serve as a detailed precedent and synopsis of earlier ones and, respectively, affirmed and imposed section 47 convictions on the two separate-facts defendants.
