= Connolly v DPP =

English criminal law case

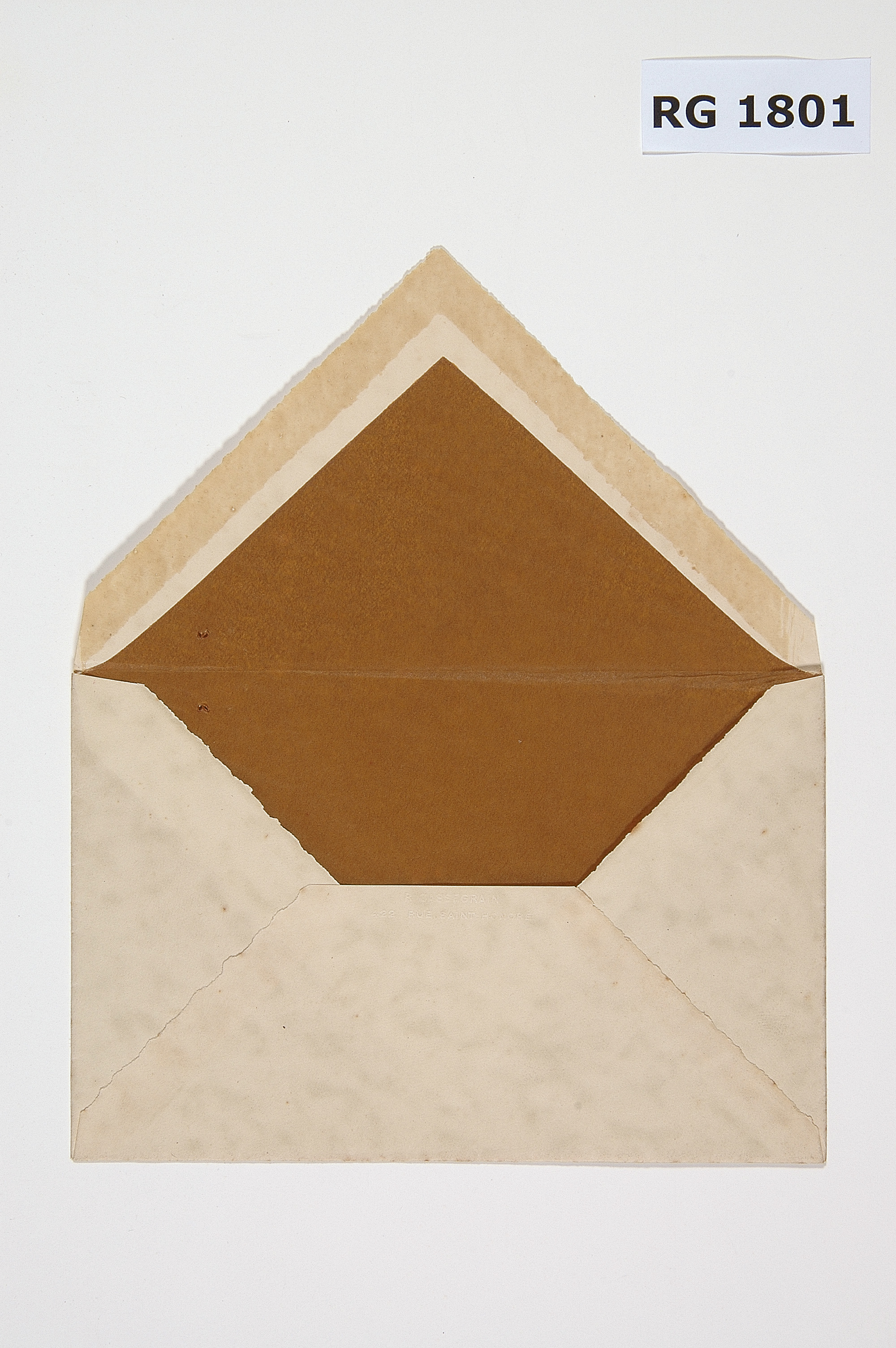
- Court: High Court (Divisional Court), appeal by way of by case stated from magistrates
- Full case name: Veronica Connelly v Director of Public Prosecution
- Decided: 2007
- Citations: [2007] EWHC 237 (Admin); [2008] 1 WLR 276

Case history
- Prior action: Conviction before magistrates
- Subsequent action: none

Case opinions
- Qualification to the right of Freedom of Expression upheld.

Keywords
- freedom of expression; obscene, grossly indecent or offensive images; hate mail; popular political cause

Connolly v DPP [2007] EWHC 237 (Admin) is an English criminal law case, in which the appellant sought to invoke the right to freedom of expression in the Human Rights Act 1998, without the qualification to that right being held to outweigh the right in relation to obscene or offensive hate mail directed as part of a mainstream political campaign.

== Facts ==
Veronica Connolly sent graphic images of aborted foetuses to pharmacies. She was a Roman Catholic who objected to the morning-after pill. She was prosecuted under the Malicious Communications Act 1988. She held that the prosecution violated her right to freedom of expression under Article 10 of the European Convention on Human Rights, as well as her rights to freedom of religion under Article 9. She was represented by Paul Diamond.

== Judgment ==
Her appeal against conviction was dismissed. Under the Human Rights Act 1998, the restriction on her "freedom of expression" was justified because the images were grossly indecent and offensive. The restriction was for the protection of the rights of others, in accordance with the exceptions included in both Articles 9 and 10.

== See also ==
- British employment equality law
- United Kingdom labour law
- Human Rights Act 1998
