= R v G =

English criminal law ruling

R v G and another
- Court: Judicial Committee of the House of Lords
- Full case name: Regina v G and another
- Decided: 16 October 2003
- Citations: [2003] UKHL 50, [2004] 1 AC 1034 [2003] 4 All ER 765, [2004] 1 AC 1034, [2004] 1 Cr App Rep 21, (2003) 167 JP 621, (2003) 167 JPN 955, [2003] 3 WLR 1060, [2004] AC 1034, [2004] 1 Cr App R 21

Case history
- Prior actions: Conviction upheld in the Court of Appeal (however certifying (referring upwards) a question of general public importance) Dyson LJ, Silber J and His Honour Judge Beaumont QC: [2002] EWCA Crim 1992
- Subsequent action: none

Court membership
- Judges sitting: Lord Bingham of Cornhill; Lord Browne-Wilkinson; Lord Steyn; Lord Hutton; Lord Rodger of Earlsferry

Keywords
- Recklessness; damage; infancy; subjective test of risk analysis; objective test only as to considering the adverse consequences

R v G [2003] is an English criminal law ruling on reckless damage, for which various offences it held that the prosecution must show a defendant subjectively appreciated a particular risk existing or going to exist to the health or property of another, and the damaging consequence, but carried on in the circumstances known to him unreasonably taking the risk. It abolished the "objective recklessness" test set out in R v Caldwell, where the standard for the existence of a risk was altered from an objective to a subjective test, whereas the reasonableness of taking the risk as it was perceived was still to be objective.

== Facts ==
Two boys, aged 11 and 12 years, were camping without their parents' permission when they entered the back yard of a shophouse, the Co-op, of Newport Pagnell in the early hours of the morning. Lighting some newspapers they found there, they left, with the papers still burning. The newspapers set fire to nearby rubbish bins against the wall, where fire spread up and on to the roof. Approximately £1m damage was caused. The children and their defence team argued they expected the fire to burn itself out although they were aware of the risk of fire spreading.

== Judgement ==
The Court of Appeal acknowledged that the Caldwell test had been criticised and had not been applied in a number of Commonwealth jurisdictions and saw great force in these criticisms but held that it was not open to it to depart from it.

That Court agreed to refer upwards to the Judicial Committee of the House of Lords (the highest court) where Lord Bingham, giving the leading opinion of the unanimous five-judge decision, saw the need to modify (in Caldwell) Lord Diplock's definition to take account of the defence of infancy, which contains the concept of "mischievous discretion". This rule requires the court to consider the extent to which children of eight or more years are able to understand the difference between "right" and "wrong". The Diplock test of obviousness might operate unfairly for 11- and 12-year-old boys if they were held to the same standard as reasonable adults. Bingham stated that

a person acts 'recklessly' with respect to:

- (i) a circumstance when he is aware of a risk that it exists or will exist;
- (ii) a result when he is aware of a risk that it will occur

and it is, in the circumstances known to him, unreasonable to take the risk. [Emphasis added]

This brings the test back to a subjective standard so that defendants can be judged on the basis of their age, experience and understanding rather than on the standard of a hypothetical reasonable person who might have better knowledge and understanding.

== Application ==
In Booth v Crown Prosecution Service (2006) All ER (D) 225 (Jan), the Divisional Court upheld the defendant pedestrian's conviction of an offence of criminal damage that, by rashly dashing into the road, he recklessly damaged the vehicle that hit him.

British criminal law senior academics have written, in publications reviewed by an independent editorial team, this result must be correct if a pedestrian does actually consider the possibility of damage to any vehicle that might become involved in an accident, but it seems more likely that, if the defendant was aware of the risk of going into a road without looking, the overwhelming result learnt through experience or a repeated teaching would be the risk of self-injury. On analysing the rule in R v G the second limb would not seem to apply without imputing to people walking into the road a new teaching, which may require extrinsic evidence – such as an active campaign against jaywalking in a district or region.

== Notes and citations ==
Notes

Citations
