= Oxford v Moss =

English criminal law case

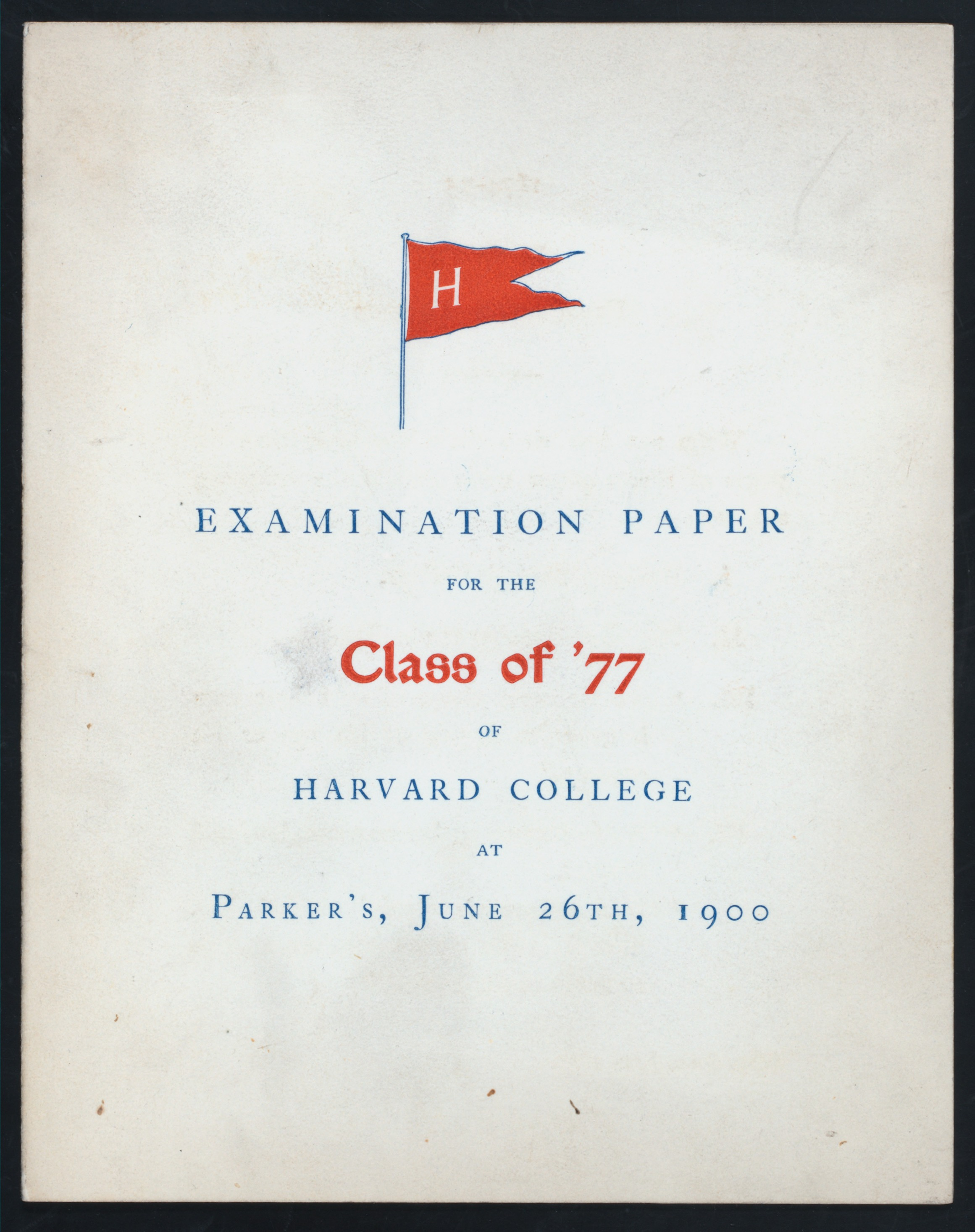
- Court: Divisional court, Queens Bench Division
- Full case name: Kenneth Oxford, Chief of Merseyside Police v. (or and or against) Moss
- Decided: 1979
- Citations: (1979) 68 Cr App Rep 183 [1979] Crim LR 119
- Cases cited: Peter Pan Manufacturing Corporation v. Corsets Silhouette ltd. [1963] 3 All E.R. 402; Seager v. Copydex Ltd. [1967] 2 All E.R. 415; Argyll v. Argyll [1965] 2 W.L.R. 790; Fraser v. Evans [1968] 3 W.L.R. 1172
- Legislation cited: Theft Act 1968, Section 4, Section 6 (1)

Case history
- Prior actions: Police v Oxford, Liverpool Magistrates Court
- Subsequent action: None

Court membership
- Judges sitting: Smith J & Wein J

Keywords
- Theft: ingredients of offence; information; intangible property; deemed intention to permanently deprive under s.6 (1) if goodness or virtue substantially or essentially lost

Oxford v Moss (1979) is an English criminal law case, dealing with theft of intangible property: information. A divisional court of High Court, to whom the legal question of the taking of a proof (final draft) exam paper was referred by magistrates, and which is not one of binding precedent, ruled that information could not be deemed to be intangible property and therefore was incapable of being stolen within the Theft Act 1968.

== Facts ==
The defendant, Moss, was a University student and managed to obtain a proof copy of his forthcoming exam paper. It was accepted that he always intended to return the proof itself, and therefore could not be convicted of theft of the proof itself; however, he was charged with stealing information belonging to the Senate of the University.

The case was heard by the Liverpool Stipendiary Magistrate, and it was argued by the prosecution that the information itself was property capable of being stolen because it had attached to it a proprietary right of confidence, and once this was breached, the information itself had been stolen. It was argued by the defence that Section 4 of the Theft Act 1968 did not define a class of intangible property beyond a chose in action, and therefore information per se was not protected by the Theft Act 1968.

The magistrate ruled that confidential information was not a form of property as defined by Section 4, and that confidence consisted in the right to control the publication of the proof and was a right over property rather than property in itself.

== Judgment ==
The divisional court considered whether confidential information falls within the definition contained in s4(1) of the Theft Act, and were referred to authorities dealing with trade secrets and matrimonial secrets. The judges said that those cases dealt with, more squarely, confidentiality yet the appropriate remedies for breach had been injunction or damages rather than criminal. The conclusion was drawn that the definition of "intangible property" was not broad enough to include confidential information, and the prosecutor's appeal was dismissed.

== Critique ==
Professor Richard Card disagrees with the outcome as opines it has omitted some reasoning:

Although confidential information in an examination is not property and cannot be stolen, if a student surreptitiously borrows a college examination paper a week before the examination, intending to copy it and then to return it, his appropriation of the piece of paper will be regarded under s 6(1) as done with the intention of permanently depriving the college authorities of it (the paper). The borrowing is clearly for a period and in the circumstances making it equivalent to an outright taking or disposal because, if the paper is returned as intended, all its goodness and virtue will have gone.
