= R v Reed =

R v Reed (Nicholas) [1982] Crim. L.R. 819 is an English criminal law case, dealing with suicide and criminal conspiracy. The court ruled that the event that the defendant conspired about did not have to take place for an offence to have been committed.

== Facts ==
R was convicted of conspiring to aid and abet suicide and other offences and was arranging suicide pacts, but no one actually committed suicide.

== Judgment ==
The court decided that if anyone had committed suicide, he would have been charged with, among other things, conspiring to aid and abet a suicide, so he should be charged now with the conspiracy. The judgment reasoned that the agreement did necessarily involve committing an offence if carried out in accordance with the conspirators' intentions. The conviction was held (on appeal) because R had put the person "in touch" with an individual who he knew would assist in suicide.

== See also ==
- English criminal law
