= R v Richards (Isabelle) =

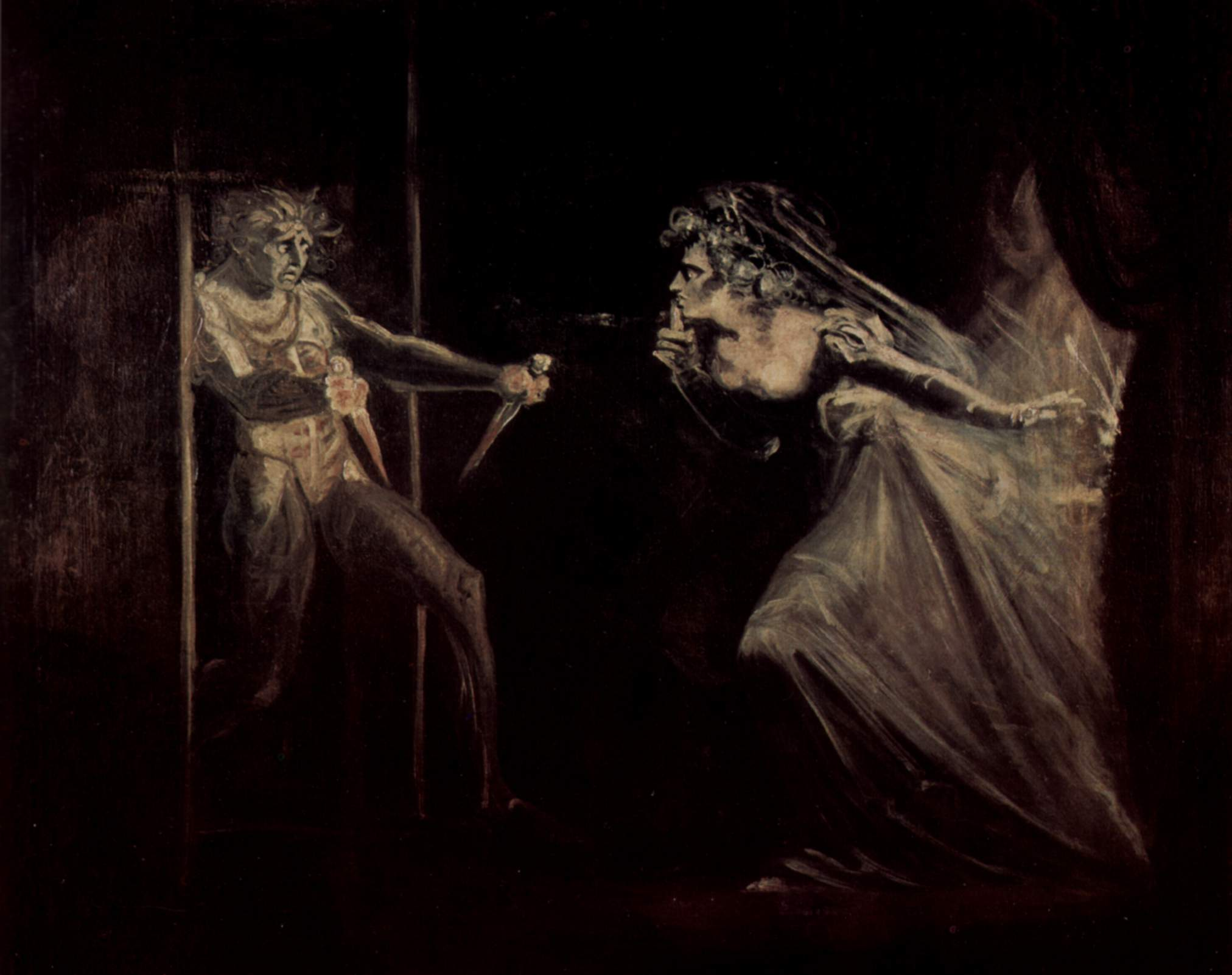
- Court: Court of Appeal (England and Wales)
- Full case name: The Crown against or and (or more formally Regina versus) Isabella Christina Richards
- Decided: 6 July 1973
- Citation: [1974] QB 776; [1973] 3 WLR 888; [1973] 3 All ER 1088; 58 Cr App R 60

Case history
- Prior action: Conviction at Bournement Crown Court (trial presided by Judge Pennant) in May 1973

Court membership
- Judges sitting: James L.J., Kilner Brown J., Boreham J.

Case opinions
- Per curiam (unanimously): after an attack has occurred: an inciter (or similar) of a single violent assault cannot be convicted of requesting an attack to be worse than was inflicted and thus for which the attackers themselves were convicted

Keywords
- inchoate offences; incitement, counselling and procuring, aiding and abetting, encouraging; can charge/offence for schemed attack outweigh that for substantive (principal) culprits

R v Richards (1973) was an English appellate decision that held that an inciter or encourager to any type of assault or battery cannot be convicted of a more serious offence than the principal inflicted even if they had asked for a more serious assault.

== Factual background ==
Defendant Richards hired Bryant and Squires to beat up her husband severely enough to put him in the hospital for a month. When the defendant's husband was leaving work, Richards gave a signal to Bryant and Squires, who assaulted him in an alley. The injuries were not as serious as anticipated and he did not require hospitalization.

== Trial court ==
Richards, Bryant, and Squires were all charged with violations of the Offences Against the Person Act, 1861. Section 18 requires intent to cause wounding or grievous bodily harm, and its violation is a felony (only triable by the Crown Court). Section 20 (its lesser included component) does not entail such intent; it is a serious misdemeanor (triable by Magistrates or the Crown Court).

Bryant and Squires were convicted of this under s. 20 yet Richards was convicted of the felony under s. 18. She appealed.

== Decision ==
The Court of Appeal (England and Wales)—of binding precedent value—quashed her conviction on the basis that one could not be held criminally liable for a more serious offence when the more serious offence did not occur.
