= R v Instan =

1893 case under English criminal law

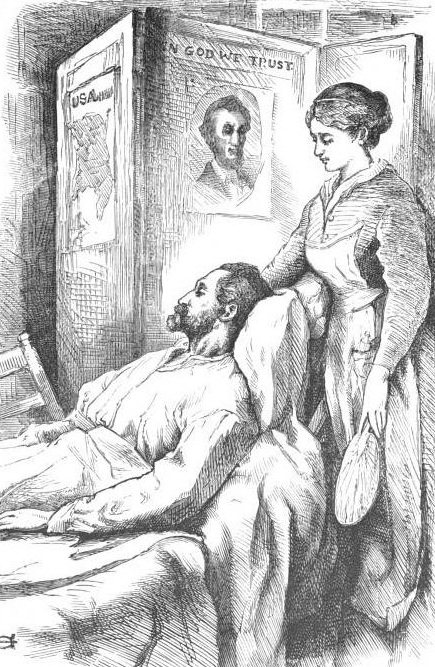
- Court: Crown Cases Reserved
- Decided: 4 February 1893
- Citation: (1893) 1 QB 450

Case history
- Subsequent action: None

Court membership
- Judge sitting: Lord Coleridge CJ

Keywords
- Manslaughter; Neglect to provide Food or Medical Attendance for Person of Full Age

R v Instan (1893) 1 QB 450 is an English criminal law manslaughter case confirming how the actus reus of manslaughter can be one of inactive negligence (that is, neglect), as the common law imposes a basic duty of care onto an adult who voluntarily undertakes the regular care of another. Here, the defendant was related to a patient who had gangrene and had in her home the funds for food to maintain both parties. The case's jurisprudential explanations for how the common law is arrived at by such a research and analysis process, not in a vacuum but rather by reference to strong moral obligations. The case has been widely cited by other leading decisions and is one of the many appeal-level decisions that inform the variety of acts and omissions sufficient to amount to the offence of gross negligence manslaughter. That subtly changes very slightly, as society's codes of morality and professional contexts evolve.

== Facts ==
The defendant lived with her aunt aged 73 years. The aunt was healthy until shortly before her death. During the last 12 days of her life, she had been incapacitated by a gangrenous foot to the point of immobility. Only the defendant knew of that condition. She appeared not to have made any attempts in obtaining treatment or care for the aunt, and she did not provide her with food, and the aunt thus went without it, but the defendant continued residence and dependency on her aunt's estate. The defendant was charged and convicted of manslaughter.

== Judgment ==
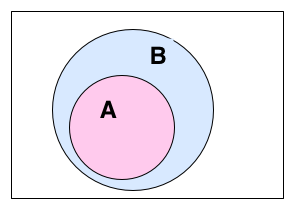
Every legal duty (shown as subset A). Every moral obligation (shown as B)

The adult niece was found guilty of manslaughter on the basis that she had accepted her aunt's money in to pay for their food. She was thus not entitled to "apply it all for her own use" (spend it all on her own food). That generated a duty of care from the niece towards the aunt. The intentional neglect of the aunt was consequently a crime. Lord Coleridge CJ wrote that despite the lack of statute or precedent, it would be "a slur on justice" were the niece's behaviour to go unpunished:

We are all of opinion that this conviction must be affirmed. It would not be correct to say that every moral obligation involves a legal duty; but every legal duty is founded on a moral obligation. A legal common law duty is nothing else than the enforcing by law of that which is a moral obligation without legal enforcement. There can be no question in this case that it was the clear duty of the prisoner to impart to the deceased so much as was necessary to sustain life of the food which she from time to time took in, and which was paid for by the deceased's own money for the purpose of the maintenance of herself and the prisoner; it was only through the instrumentality of the prisoner that the deceased could get the food. There was, therefore, a common law duty imposed upon the prisoner which she did not discharge.

Nor can there be any question that the failure of the prisoner to discharge her legal duty at least accelerated the death of the deceased, if it did not actually cause it. There is no case directly in point; but it would be a slur upon and a discredit to the administration of justice in this country if there were any doubt as to the legal principle, or as to the present case being within it. The prisoner was under a moral obligation to the deceased from which arose a legal duty towards her; that legal duty the prisoner has wilfully and deliberately left unperformed, with the consequence that there has been an acceleration of the death of the deceased owing to the non-performance of that legal duty. it is unnecessary to say more than that upon the evidence this conviction was most properly arrived at.

== Aftermath ==
The niece would be disinherited by law by virtue of the forfeiture rule.

The starting point, as is considered in sentencing, for such an offence of the exact nature remains a custodial sentence.

== See also ==
- English law
  - Making of a new precedent
  - Judicial activism
  - Common law offence
- Homicide in English law
  - Gross negligence manslaughter
    - Criminal negligence - the level that is often called "gross" in the same offence.
