= Bazeley's Case =

1799 English criminal case

R v Bazeley
- Full case name: Rex (or The King) versus Bazeley
- Citation: 2 East P.C. 571, Cr. Cas. Res. 1799

Bazeley's Case is an English criminal case of 1799 that prompted Parliament to create the crime of embezzlement.

== Overview ==
Bazeley was a bank teller who took money from a depositor but applied it to pay a sum he owed to Bazeley's own business. The court agreed with Bazeley's argument (acquitting him) that the bank only had a right to possess or title to the note, not possession of it.

== Consequence ==
The Embezzlement Act 1799 — prompted by the case — was enacted before the end of the year to forbid the fraudulent conversion of money or property that an employee receives for their employer.

=== Prohibition of financial exploitation of position ===
The illustrative actions (facts) of the case before the court amounted to acting as an agent of another party, without their express or lawfully implied permission. Bazeley's underhand act boosted immediate cash flow and avoided cost of debt collection in Bazeley's business. Assuming (almost always true) the other party owed other debts or had other outgoings then the action is furthermore one of granting oneself a position as a preferential creditor, ensuring debts were paid ahead of all other matters by the debtor, regardless of their solvency (which means avoiding the risk and cost of bad debt).

These were the gaps in the law (lacunae or mischiefs) addressed by the new crime of embezzlement which aimed to target most, if not all, financial abuse of position.
