= Betts v Armstead =

English case on product liability

Betts v. Armstead, L.R. 20 Q.B.D. 771 (1888), was an English case decided by the Queen's Bench that adopted a strict liability standard and furthermore no requirement of knowledge or suspicion for violations of the Sale of Food and Drugs Act 1875 (38 & 39 Vict. c. 63). The defendant contended that he did not know that his product did not abide by the standards of the statute, but the court held that there was no mens rea requirement for the violation.
