= R v O'Grady =

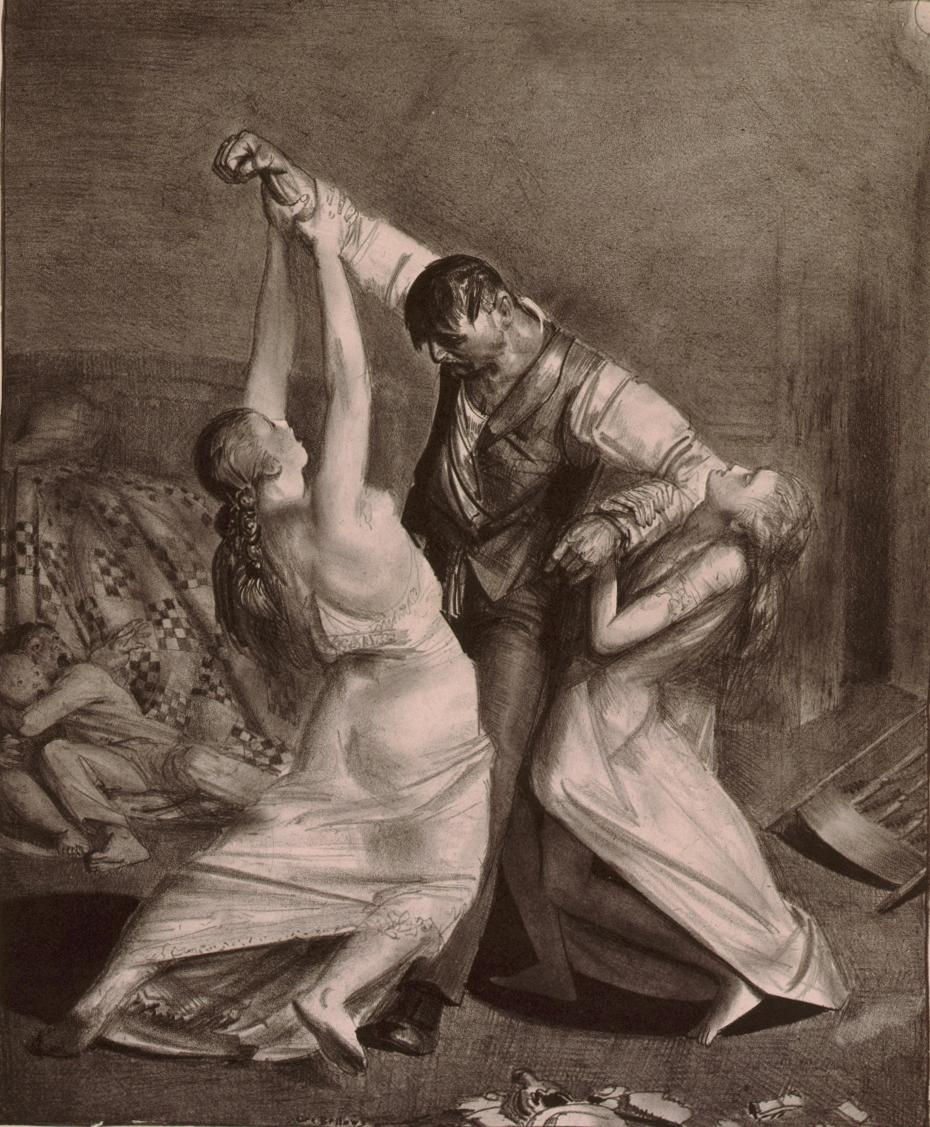
- Court: Court of Appeal of England and Wales
- Full case name: Regina v Patrick Gerald O'Grady
- Decided: 11 June 1987
- Citation: [1987] QB 995 [1987] 3 WLR 321; [1987] 3 All ER 420; 85 Cr App R 315
- Cases cited: R v Williams (Gladstone)

Case history
- Prior actions: Conviction by jury, trial presided by Judge Underhill, Q.C.
- Subsequent action: Leave to appeal to the highest court: refused: [1988] 1 WLR 133, HL(E)

Court membership
- Judges sitting: Lord Lane CJ and two others

Keywords
- Voluntary intoxication in English law; Self-defence in English law; Mistake (criminal law); unlawful intercourse

R v O'Grady [1987] QB 995 was a reported appeal of the Court of Appeal of England and Wales. It ruled that a drunken mistake can only be used to (partially) negate mens rea (and only for crimes of specific intent) and not to justify an unreasonable use of force in a plea of self-defence. Ordinarily, in relation that plea, the necessity for force must be judged from the defendant's perspective. Nonetheless, a mistake largely self-induced by drugs or alcohol would undermine that plea, that is, where it caused the mistaken belief as to whether the level of force involved was reasonable.

== Facts ==
The appellant was an alcoholic. He had spent the day drinking large quantities of alcohol with two friends. The friends then retired to the appellant's home and went to sleep. The appellant claimed he was woken by one of the friends, McCloskey, hitting him on the head. He said that he picked up some broken glass and started hitting McCloskey in order to defend himself. He said he only recalled hitting him a few times and a fight developed during which McCloskey had the better of him throughout. He said the fight subsided and he cooked them both a chop and went to sleep. In the morning he found McCloskey dead. His death was caused by loss of blood. He had 20 wounds to his face, in addition to injuries to the hands and a fractured rib. There was severe bruising to the head, brain, neck and chest. There was a fracture of the spine caused by the head being forced backwards. There was a fractured rib. The blows to the body had been delivered by both sharp and blunt objects.

== Held ==
It was held that defendant is not entitled to rely, so far as self-defence is concerned, upon a mistake of fact which has been induced by voluntary intoxication.

Lord Lane CJ: "There are two competing interests. On the one hand the interest of the defendant who has only acted according to what he believed to be necessary to protect himself, and on the other hand that of the public in general and the victim in particular who, probably through no fault of his own, has been injured or perhaps killed because of the defendant's drunken mistake. Reason recoils from the conclusion that in such circumstances a defendant is entitled to leave the Court without a stain on his character."

This case was affirmed by Hatton [2005] EWCA Crim 2951, extending the principle in O'Grady (which applied to manslaughter) to a crime of murder.
