= R v K =

South African legal case

In R v K, an important case in South African criminal law, the Appellate Division held that, in cases of private defence, the assault on the accused need not be committed culpably. It is also possible to act in private defence against someone who lacks criminal capacity, such as a mentally disordered person. Centlivres CJ compared the law in South Africa with what Holmes J said in Brown v United States:

Many respectable writers agree that if a man reasonably believes that he is in immediate danger of death or grievous bodily harm from his assailant he may stand his ground and that if he kills he has not exceeded the bounds of lawful self-defence [....] Detached reflection cannot be demanded in the presence of an up-lifted knife.

== See also ==
- Crime
- Law of South Africa
- South African criminal law
