= R v Dixon =

English criminal law case

Rex v. Dixon, 3 M. & S. 11 (K.B. 1814), was a case decided by the King's Bench that held that a person could not be convicted of selling impure foods unless he knew of the impurities.

== Subsequent history ==
The case was later overruled in Regina v. Woodrow, which abolished the mens rea requirement of Rex v. Dixon.
