= Lurking doubt =

Legal test used in England and Wales

Lurking doubt, also known as the Cooper test, is a legal test allowing an appeal court in England and Wales to overturn a conviction on the basis that it disagrees with the jury's verdict.

It was introduced in R v Cooper by Judge Widgery. In that case, the appeal was based on mistaken identity rather than any irregularity, as all the issues were before a properly-instructed jury. In overturning the conviction in the Criminal Division of the Court of Appeal, the judge wrote:

... in cases of this kind the Court must in the end ask itself a subjective question, whether we are content to let the matter stand as it is, or whether there is not some lurking doubt in our minds which makes us wonder whether an injustice has been done.

Appeals on this principle are rarely successful and some regard it as problematic. It has been criticised as allowing the Court of Appeal to overturn juries: a later appeal court judgement says "it is not the function of this court to decide whether or not the jury was right in reaching its verdicts," while others argue that a more formal method for overturning juries' mistakes needs to be found.

The test was reaffirmed in R v B: "There can be no doubt that the lurking doubt notion ... continues to be a tool available to this court" and it can set aside convictions in the interests of justice.

The phrase also occurs in commentary on derived legal systems, such as New Zealand and Jersey.
