= R v Pittwood =

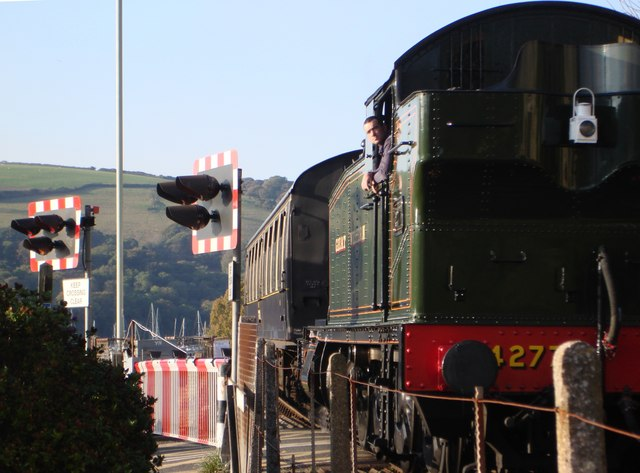
- Court: Crown Court / Assizes
- Full case name: Regina v. Pittwood
- Citation: [1902] TLR 37

Court membership
- Judge sitting: Jury trial presided by Mr Justice Wright

Case opinions
- Depending on the facts, such as the contract in this case, there is a duty to act in the criminal law to save others from physical harm, including in the law of manslaughter.

Keywords
- manslaughter; omission; failure in duty to act to save others from physical harm

R v Pittwood [1902] is a case in English criminal law as to omission, specifically the duty to act to save others from physical harm, finding an omission that amounted to manslaughter.

== Facts ==
Railway crossing keeper, Pittwood, failed in his duty (by contract owed to his employer) to close a level crossing gate, leading to the death of a wagon driver after a train crashed into his horse and cart.

== Judgment ==
He was found guilty of manslaughter.

Mr Justice Wright ruled that depending on the facts, such as the contract in this case, there is a duty to act in the criminal law to save others from physical harm, including in the law of manslaughter.
