= R v Holland =

English criminal law case

- Court: Court of Appeal
- Full case name: Regina v. Holland
- Citation: (1841) 2 Mood. & R. 351

Case opinions
- Per curiam (unanimously): manslaughter or murder can remain the appropriate charge notwithstanding that a victim has refused medical treatment, in some circumstances

Keywords
- Novus actus interveniens; causation; refused gangrene treatment

R v Holland (1841) is a general-principle English criminal law decision as to novus actus interveniens — breaking the chain of causation. It confirmed the rarity of scenarios that will break the chain when serious, intentional bodily harm is carried out.

== Facts ==
The defendant (Holland) mugged Thomas Garland with a knife. During the incident, Garland's thumb was cut. Gangrene and tetanus set into that wound. Garland's doctor warned Garland that amputation was necessary. The victim refused medical treatment for the gangrene-infected wound initially. Garland later, after the thumb got worse, did get the thumb amputated, but it was too late and he died anyway of sepsis. Had Garland listened to advice sooner, he would likely have survived. Based on surviving descriptions of the wound, it is likely that amputation would have been necessary even with modern medical technology.

Holland was caught and placed on trial. Holland tried using, as a defense, that the victim would have survived with better treatment and thus murder was not an appropriate charge. Garland's doctor was even placed on the stand and testified that had Garland gotten his thumb amputated on time, Garland would still be alive. The defense, was, essentially, that infection killed the victim, not the mugger.

== Decision ==
The court ruled that it did not matter whether or not the wound was instantly fatal, or the victim later died because the victim did not receive proper treatment. Instead, the court used the 'but for' test; 'but for the initial injury, would the victim have died?' The ruling was unanimous. Even though the victim broke the chain of causation, the defendant had started the chain and he was rightly in law convicted of murder.

== Application ==
The decision was directly applied (followed) in R v Blaue.
