= Rice v Connolly =

- Court: High Court: Divisional Court, at Grimsby Quarter Sessions
- Full case name: Leonard Rice v Thomas Connolly (Inspector of Humberside Police)
- Decided: 3 May 1966
- Citation: [1966] 2 QB 414, [1966] 2 All ER 649, [1966] 3 WLR 17, 130 JP 322

Case history
- Prior action: Conviction at Magistrates Court in Grimsby

Court membership
- Judges sitting: LORD PARKER C.J., MARSHALL J and JAMES J

Case opinions
- Per curiam (unanimously): there is no relevant legal duty to assist a police officer at the time and in the circumstances of the present case

Keywords
- police enquiries outside of arrest; providing little assistance; whether wilful obstruction of police officer

Rice v. Connolly (1966) is an English legal precedent holding that there is no strict, general legal duty to assist a police officer prior to any possible arrest or caution, with even basic police enquiries nor to accompany the officer to a requested location.

== Background ==
Leonard Rice on 20 March 1965 would not give his forename, nor full address, nor accompany the officer to a requested place (here, immaterially, a police box). The police prosecuted him as such and magistrates, considering the statutory words "wilfully obstructs", convicted him.

He appealed against conviction: for such obstruction of a constable when in the execution of his duty (contrary to Police Act 1964 s. 51 (3)).

== Appellate decision ==
It was held that "although every citizen had a moral or social duty to assist the police, there was no relevant legal duty to that effect in the circumstances of the present case, and the appellant had been entitled to decline to answer the questions put to him and (prior to his arrest) to accompany the police officer".

== See also ==
- Police and Criminal Evidence Act 1984
