= R v Woodrow =

1846 English criminal law case

Regina v. Woodrow, 15 M. & W. 404 (Exch. 1846) was a case decided by the English Court of Exchequer Chamber that first adopted a strict liability standard for the criminal offence of selling impure foods.

== Decision ==
The defendant was charged with violating a statute that prohibited possession of adulterated tobacco. The court held the defendant criminally liable even though he had no knowledge or reason to suspect the adulteration. The court justified this adoption of strict liability as being in the interests of convenient prosecution.

This decision overruled Rex v. Dixon, which had included a mens rea requirement.
