= Fitzpatrick v Kelly =

Fitzpatrick v. Kelly, L.R. 8 Q.B. 337 (1873), was an English case decided by the Queen's Bench that adopted a strict liability standard for violations of the Adulteration of Food Act (35 & 36 Vict. c. 74, s. 2 (1872)). The defendant was prosecuted for selling adulterated butter, and the court did not require a showing of mens rea.
