= Larceny =

Crime, unlawful taking of personal property

Larceny is a crime involving the unlawful taking or theft of the personal property of another person or business. It was an offence under the common law of England and became an offence in jurisdictions which incorporated the common law of England into their own law (also statutory law), where in many cases it remains in force.

The crime of larceny has been abolished in England, Wales, Ireland, and Northern Ireland, broken up into the specific crimes of burglary, robbery, fraud, theft, and related crimes. However, larceny remains an offence in parts of the United States, Jersey, and in New South Wales, Australia, involving the taking (caption) and carrying away (asportation) of personal property without the owner's consent and without intending to return it.

== Etymology ==
The word "larceny" is a late Middle English word, from the French word larcin, "theft". Its probable Latin root is latrocinium, a derivative of latro, "robber" (originally mercenary).

== By nation ==
=== Australia ===
==== New South Wales ====
In the state of New South Wales, the common law offence of larceny is punishable with up to 5 years' imprisonment. Whilst section 117 of the New South Wales Crimes Act 1900 specifies the punishment for larceny, it is silent on the elements of the offence, leaving them to be articulated by the common law. The leading authority on larceny in NSW is the High Court of Australia case of Ilich v R (1987). This case stipulates the mens rea and actus reus elements required to be proven by the prosecution for a successful conviction.

=== Ireland ===
The common law offence of larceny was abolished on 1 August 2002. However, proceedings for larceny committed before its abolition are not affected by this.

=== United Kingdom ===
==== England and Wales ====
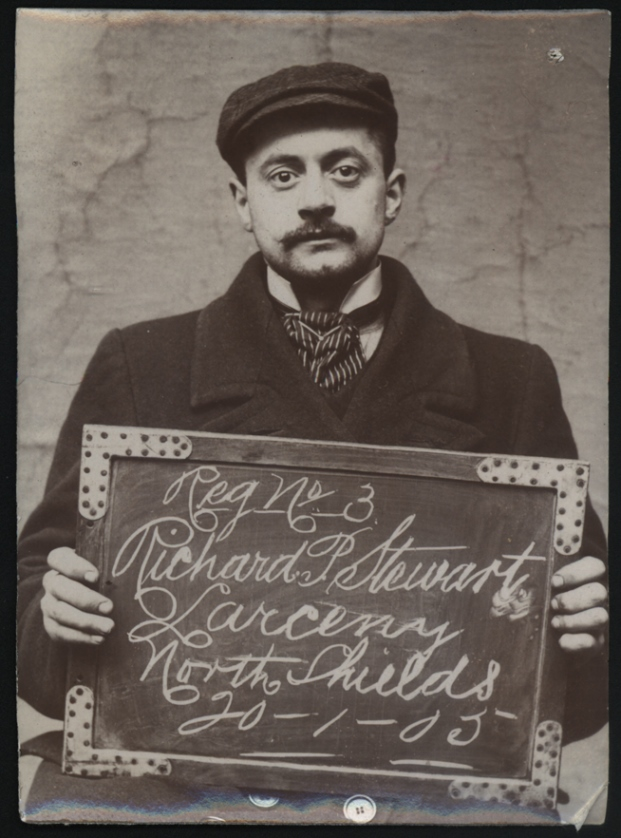
Richard Percy Stewart, 27, was a painter arrested in North Shields, England for larceny in 1905, after stealing a jacket and vest. He was sentenced to 3 months in prison.

The common law offence of larceny was codified by the Larceny Act 1916. It was abolished on 1 January 1969, for all purposes not relating to offences committed before that date. It has been replaced by the broader offence of theft under section 1(1) of the Theft Act 1968. This offence did incorporate some of the terminology and substance of larceny. Despite the offence's being abolished in England, it has been retained in the Crown Dependency of Jersey.

==== Northern Ireland ====
The common law offence of larceny was abolished on 1 August 1969, for all purposes not relating to offences committed before that date. It has been replaced by the broader offence of theft under section 1(1) of the Theft Act (Northern Ireland) 1969.

=== United States ===
Chart indicating the distribution of forms of larceny in the United States, according to the 2004 Uniform Crime Report.

Larceny laws in the United States of America have their roots in common law, pursuant to which larceny involves the trespassory taking (caption) and carrying away (asportation, removal) of the tangible personal property of another with the intent to permanently deprive the owner of its possession. Larceny is now codified as a statutory crime in all U.S. jurisdictions.

Under many states' larceny statutes, including California, larceny can include the taking of "money, labor, or real or personal property."

== Elements ==
=== Possession versus custody ===
Larceny is a crime against possession. Furthermore, it has two elements which must be met: the actual taking of the property, even if momentarily (actus reus), and the culpable intent (mens rea) to deprive another of their property. Larceny involves the trespassory taking of property from possession of another, with the intent to permanently deprive the owner of that property. To understand larceny, one must understand the distinction between custody and possession.

- A person has possession of property when he has actual physical control over the property (actual possession) or he has the right to exercise considerable control over the disposition or use of the property (constructive possession).
- A person has custody if he has actual physical control of the property, but the person who has constructive possession has substantially restricted the custodian's right to use the property.

Examples of custody would be a store customer examining the goods of a merchant, or an employee who has been given the property of his employer to be used in his employment. This is to be contrasted to, for example, a person who has obtained actual possession of the property by fraud.

Ancient Roman law (first 50 years of written University law, possibly borrowing from Greek law there is no copy of) was more lax about "simple possession"; it was assumed "borrowing" if there was no one to ask: unless or until other factors arose (such as refusal to return promptly when asked).

=== Take ===
The taking or caption element requires that the offender take actual physical control of the property, if but for a moment. Under the common law, it was not sufficient if the offender simply deprived the victim of possession; the offender must have gained control over the property. Thus merely knocking an article from a person's hand was not larceny, as long as the defendant did not thereafter take it. The control must be complete. In a famous case, the defendant removed an overcoat from a department store mannequin and began to walk away with it. The overcoat was secured to the mannequin by a chain, a fact the defendant first discovered when the chain drew taut. These actions were held not to be larceny because the defendant never had complete control over the disposition and use of the coat.

The taking may be only momentary. In another famous case, the defendant snatched an earring from the victim which immediately became entangled in the victim's hair. The court held that the defendant's control over the property, although momentary, was sufficient to constitute a taking. The taking may be either direct or indirect; that is, accomplished by the criminal himself or an innocent agent.

The equivalent term "deprive" is also sometimes used:

To "deprive" another of property means (a) to withhold it or cause it to be withheld from him permanently or for so extended a period or under such circumstances that the major portion of its economic value or benefit is lost to him, or (b) to dispose of the property in such manner or under such circumstances as to render it unlikely that an owner will recover such property.

— N.Y. Penal L. § 155.00 (3).

=== Carry away ===
Traditionally, a thief must not only gain dominion over the property, but also must move it from its original position. The slightest movement, a hair's breadth, is sufficient. However, the entirety of the property must be moved. As Professor Wayne LaFave noted, at its most literal this requirement renders the rotating of a doughnut a larceny, but not the rotating of a pie, as all of the doughnut is moved through rotation while the pie's exact center remains in the same place when rotated. The movement must also be an actual asportation, rather than movement in preparation. For example, in one case the victim had left his wheelbarrow in his yard. As was his custom he turned the wheelbarrow upside down to avoid water collecting in the tub. The defendant intending to steal the wheelbarrow turned it over but was apprehended by the owner before he could push the wheelbarrow away. The court held that the defendant's acts did not satisfy the asportation element of larceny because the movement of the wheelbarrow had merely been preparatory to the carrying away.

Contrary to popular belief, it is not necessary that the property be removed from the owner's premises or be taken off his property for an asportation to be complete. The slightest movement from its original position with the intent to steal is enough. The problem is proof. If a person picks up a package of steaks intending to steal them then changes her or his mind and puts the steak back in the meat counter, the crime of larceny has been committed but the state will have a difficult time proving it. However, if the thief conceals the steaks by sticking them inside clothing, his or her intent is rather clear. Of course, there could still be an innocent if bizarre explanation.

That said, the asportation requirement is not universally required. In People v. Alamo, for example, the New York Court of Appeals eliminated the asportation requirement. In that case the defendant entered a stranger's car and turned on the car's lights and engine. The Court read asportation as merely a corroborative element of possession and control, and thus not necessary to establish possession and control of a car because transportation is the purpose of a car. Turning it on suffices to establish that the thief has taken possession and control.

Additionally, the Model Penal Code eliminates the asportation requirement and instead requires that the defendant "exercise unlawful control". The drafters noted that historically the asportation requirement distinguished larceny (a felony) and attempted larceny (a misdemeanor). They reasoned, therefore, that asportation was an irrelevant requirement because in modern criminal law, like the Model Penal Code, the sentencing consequences between an attempted and completed crime are negligible.

=== Personal property ===
From its creation the subject matter of larceny has been tangible personal property, with a physical existence: items that can be seen, held, and felt (or in technical terms, property that has a "corporeal existence").

This limitation means that acts of common law larceny cannot be committed against land or items attached to or forming part of land, such as buildings, trees or shrubbery, crops growing in the field, or minerals. Acts of common law larceny cannot be committed against intangible things, such as love or affection, identity (identity theft is a type of fraud), or intellectual property, such as information and ideas. For example, if a person stole the Coca-Cola formula, the crime would be larceny, but the grade of the offense would be determined by the value of the paper on which the formula was recorded, not the value of the recipe. (Theft of trade secrets would be a different offense.)

Services and labor, as well as intangible personal property (incorporeal rights) such as contract rights and choses in action; wills, codicils, or other testamentary documents; wild animals; and items having no economic value cannot be the subjects of acts of common-law larceny.

Most states have enacted statutes to expand the coverage of larceny to include most if not all of the items mentioned above. For example, North Carolina has statutes that make it a crime to steal choses in action, growing crops and so on.

The restriction of the scope of larceny to personal property may have practical consequences. For example, a person may "steal" a central air conditioning unit by cutting the connections to the house, removing the unit from its concrete pad and hauling the disconnected unit away in a truck. In most jurisdictions, a central air conditioning unit changes from personal property to real property (a fixture) once it is attached to a building. Modernly, severance of a fixture from the realty would convert the fixture from real property back to personal property. However, the common law stated that if the severance and carrying away of a fixture were one continuous act, no larceny would occur. The defendant's actions in this example would thus merely constitute damage to real property, and would further not result in possession of stolen property since no larceny had taken place. However, if the person disconnected the air conditioner, left the premises to find someone to help him move the unit, returned and loaded the unit on his truck and left, the crime would be larceny.

=== Of another ===
The property taken must be "of another". Thus wild animals cannot be stolen, although possession of a wild animal can itself be unlawful. Nor can co-owners be guilty of larceny. Larceny is a crime against possession. Therefore, it is possible for the person who has title to the property to steal the property from a person who had lawful possession. For example, states provide that a person who repairs a car had a lien on the car to secure payment for the work. The lien is a possessory lien meaning the repair person has the lien as long as he maintains possession of the car. If the title owner were to take the car from the lienholder this action could be prosecuted as larceny in some jurisdictions.

=== Without consent ===
The taking must be trespassory; that is, it must be without the consent of the owner. This means that the taking must have been accomplished by stealth, force, threat of force, or deceit. If the offender obtained possession lawfully then a subsequent misappropriation is not larceny.

=== Intent to steal (animus furandi) ===
The offender must have taken the property with the intent to steal it. Traditionally intent to steal is defined as the intent to deprive the owner of the possession of the property permanently. "Permanently" means indefinitely, that is, with no plan to return the property to the rightful owner. However, intent to steal includes other states of mind such as the intent to recklessly deprive the owner of the property permanently.

A person who takes property of another under the mistaken belief that the property belongs to him does not have the requisite intent to steal; nor does a person "intend to steal" property when he takes property intending to make temporary use of it and then return the property to the owner within a reasonable time. However, it is not a defense that the defendant did not know that the property belonged to the true owner, only that he knew that it did not belong to him.

=== Must have value ===
Larceny protects the possession of goods – objects that have economic value. A good has economic value if it has a price; that is, the property can be sold in a market. Thus, if the property taken has no economic value, it is not subject to larceny statutes. Under contemporary larceny laws, it is normally sufficient to support a larceny charge if the item has any value to the owner, even if its market value would be negligible.

Under New York State law, written instruments, utility services, and items of unascertainable value have special rules, and for grand larceny in the fourth degree, a motor vehicle must have value of $100 or greater. Otherwise, value is defined generally as:

the market value of the property at the time and place of the crime, or if such cannot be satisfactorily ascertained, the cost of replacement of the property within a reasonable time after the crime.

— N.Y. Penal L. § 155.20 (1).

==== Grand larceny ====
Grand larceny is typically defined as larceny of a more significant amount of property. The classification of larceny as grand or petit larceny originated in an English statute passed in 1275 (grand is a French word meaning "large" while petit is a French word meaning "small"). Both were felonies, but the punishment for grand larceny was death while the punishment for petit larceny was forfeiture of property to the Crown and whipping. The classification was based on the value of the property taken. The offence was grand larceny if the value of the property taken was greater than twelve pence, approximately the value of a sheep in the thirteenth century.

Most jurisdictions have discarded the grand/petit terminology and use value to classify larcenies as felonies or misdemeanors. "Value" means the fair market value of the property at the time and place taken. In the US, it is often defined as an amount valued at least $400. In New York, grand larceny refers to amounts of at least $1,000. Grand larceny is often classified as a felony with the concomitant possibility of a harsher sentence. In Virginia the threshold is only $5 if taken from a person, or $500 if not taken from the person. The same penalty applies for stealing checks as for cash or other valuables. Some states (such as North Carolina) use the term "felonious larceny" instead of grand larceny. Most jurisdictions also make certain larcenies felonies regardless of the value of the property taken. For example, North Carolina General Statutes Section 14 - 72 (b)(1) makes the crime of larceny a felony "without regard to value" if the larceny is (1) from the person (2) committed pursuant to certain types of breaking or enterings (3) of any explosive or incendiary device or (4) of any firearm. The modern spelling is petit larceny for the misdemeanor level. Some states may also charge certain types of larceny as "robbery", "burglary", "theft", "shoplifting", "conversion", and other terms.

== Problem areas ==
=== Subject matter ===
As noted above one cannot steal items "affixed to the earth" because such things are not personal property. However, one of the remarkable qualities of property is its shiftiness: its ability to change its character often and quickly, from real to personal and from personal to real. The principal methods of achieving this transformation are attachment and severance. If personal property is attached to land, it becomes real property. And if real property is severed from the land (rendered unattached) it becomes personal property. Examples abound. A person buys a furnace. The furnace company dispatches a technician to deliver and install the heating system. Before installation the heating system is personal property. It has corporeal presence and it can be moved around as witnessed by the fact that the technician picked it up at the warehouse, loaded it into his truck, drove it to the house, unloaded it, placed it in the basement and hooked it up to the house. The "hooking up" is the act that transformed what was personal property to real property. Once it is installed it has become "attached to the land" (the house) and is now considered real property. The attachment to the house has to be more than casual for personal property to become real property. For example, a table lamp that is plugged into a wall socket is not real property. A window air conditioning unit is not real property.

=== Comparison with embezzlement ===
Embezzlement differs from larceny in two ways. First, in embezzlement, an actual conversion must occur; second, the original taking must not be trespassory. To say that the taking was not trespassory is to say that the person(s) performing the embezzlement had the right to possess, use, and/or access the assets in question, and that such person(s) subsequently secreted and converted the assets for an unintended and/or unsanctioned use. Conversion requires that the secretion interferes with the property, rather than just relocate it. As in larceny, the measure is not the gain to the embezzler, but the loss to the asset stakeholders. An example of conversion is when a person logs checks in a check register or transaction log as being used for one specific purpose and then explicitly uses the funds from the checking account for another and completely different purpose. It is important to make clear that embezzlement is not always a form of theft or an act of stealing, since those definitions specifically deal with taking something that does not belong to the perpetrator(s). Instead, embezzlement is, more generically, an act of deceitfully secreting assets by one or more persons that have been entrusted with such assets. The person(s) entrusted with such assets may or may not have an ownership stake in such assets.

In the case where it is a form of theft, distinguishing between embezzlement and larceny can be tricky. Making the distinction is particularly difficult when dealing with misappropriations of property by employees. To prove embezzlement, the state must show that the employee had possession of the goods "by virtue of her employment"; that is, that the employee had the authority to exercise substantial control over the goods. Typically, in determining whether the employee had sufficient control the courts will look at factors such as the job title, job description and the particular employment practices. For example, the manager of a shoe department at a store would likely have sufficient control over the shoes that if she converted the goods to her own use she would be guilty of embezzlement. On the other hand, if the same employee were to steal cosmetics from the cosmetic counter, so long as they did not convert the product, the crime would not be embezzlement but larceny. For a case that exemplifies the difficulty of distinguishing larceny and embezzlement see State v. Weaver, 359 N.C. 246; 607 S.E.2d 599 (2005).

==== By trick ====
Using confidence tricks (deception) to get possession of property is larceny.

Larceny by trick is descriptive of the method used to obtain possession. The concept arose from Pear's Case decided in 1779. The issue was whether a person who had fraudulently obtained possession of personal property (a horse) could be convicted of larceny. The chief impediment to conviction was the doctrine of possessorial immunity which said that a person who had acquired possession lawfully, that is with the consent of the owner, could not be prosecuted for larceny. Clearly the owner of the horse had given the defendant possession of the animal – he had agreed that the defendant could borrow the horse to ride to Surrey. The case would seem to have been cut and dried – the doctrine of possessorial immunity applied and the defendant was therefore not guilty of larceny. The court held that consent induced by fraud was not consent in the eyes of the law. The fraudulent act that induced the owner to transfer possession "vitiated" the consent. This concept of consent broadened the scope of larceny. Before, consent meant the voluntary relinquishment of possession and thus property was wrongfully taken only if the defendant acquired possession by stealth, force or threat of force.

==== By employees ====
An employee is generally presumed to have custody rather than possession of property of his employer used during his employment. Thus the misappropriation would be larceny. However, officers, managers and employees who have significant authority over the disposition or use of the employer's property have possession rather than custody and the misappropriation of the property would likely be embezzlement rather than larceny. Determining whether an employee has custody or possession can be difficult. A careful examination of the employee's duties and responsibilities, his authority over the property and the actual business practices is required.

If a third party transfers possession of property to an employee for delivery to his employer, the employee has possession of the property and his conversion of the property would be embezzlement rather than larceny. For example, if a customer of a bank delivers money to a teller to deposit in the customer's account, the teller had possession of the property and his misappropriation would be embezzlement rather than larceny. However, once the teller transfers possession of the money to his employer, by placing the money in the till for example, the subsequent taking would be larceny rather than embezzlement. This rule does not apply if the teller intending to steal the property places the money in the till merely as a temporary repository or to hide his peculation.

==== Aggregation issues ====
Thievery may well involve many items of personal property stolen from multiple victims. Questions arise as to whether such situations are to be treated as one large theft or multiple small ones. The answer depends on the circumstances. If a thief steals multiple items from one victim during a single episode the courts doubtlessly would treat the act as one crime. The same result would obtain if the thief stole items from the same victim over a period of time on the grounds that the stealing was pursuant to a common scheme or plan. The effect would be that the state could aggregate the value of the various items taken in determining whether the crime was a felony or misdemeanor. Such a result would not always work to the criminal's detriment. Aggregation is also generally permitted when the thief steals property from multiple victims at the same time. For example, a thief steals "rims" from several cars parked in the same lot. On the other hand, aggregation is not permitted when a thief steals items from various victims at different times and places.

== See also ==
- Pickpocketing
