= R v B =

R. v B. [1997] 2 Cr. App. R. 88, CA was a case in which the undisclosed party (B) was charged with an indecent assault on two of his grandsons.

The evidence introduced in this case was pornographic magazines that belonged to the accused B. The House of Lords held this evidence to be inadmissible in suggesting that B had committed the assault. The magazines along with other evidence were not enough to convict B as they did not meet the proper criteria for the admissibility of what is known as similar fact evidence.

As a result, in this case it is shown that evidence which only highlights the accused in question to be of a "bad disposition" will be deemed inadmissible. This is because, for evidence to be admissible, it must do more than just merely suggest that the person has the propensity to commit the charged crime.
