= R v Blaue =

1975 English criminal law case

- Court: Court of Appeal
- Full case name: Regina v. Ronald Konrad Blaue
- Decided: 9 July 1975
- Citation: [1975] 1 WLR 1411; [1975] 3 All ER 446; (1975) 61 Cr App R 271; [1975] Crim LR 648; (1975) 119 SJ 589

Case history
- Prior action: Conviction at Teesside Crown Court (trial presided by Mocatta J.) in October 1974

Court membership
- Judges sitting: Lawton L.J., Thompson J, Shaw J

Case opinions
- Per curiam (unanimously): manslaughter or murder can remain the appropriate charge notwithstanding that a victim has refused medical treatment, in some circumstances

Keywords
- Novus actus interveniens; causation; blood transfusion; manslaughter on ground of diminished responsibility and wounding; appeal against homicide conviction

R v Blaue (1975) 61 Cr App R 271 is an English criminal law appeal in which the Court of Appeal decided, being a court of binding precedent thus established, that the refusal of a Jehovah's Witness to accept a blood transfusion after being stabbed did not constitute an intervening act for the purposes of legal causation. This upheld the decision of Mocatta J. in the court below, Teesside Crown Court.

== Facts and legal processes ==
The defendant, Ronald Konrad Blaue, entered the home of an 18-year-old woman, Jacolyn Woodhead, and asked for sex. When she declined his advances, he stabbed her four times; one wound penetrated her lung which necessitated both a blood transfusion and surgery to save her life. After refusing treatment because of her religious beliefs as a Jehovah's Witness, she died. The prosecution conceded that she would not have died if she had received treatment.

The prosecution did not challenge unrelated evidence that the defendant was suffering from diminished responsibility which reduced murder to manslaughter, decreasing the starting point for any sentencing.

Examined in his case, counsel for the Crown accepted the refusal to have a blood transfusion was a cause of the death. The defence argued that the refusal to accept medical treatment broke the chain of causation (in modern comparative and ancient law in Latin this is called a novus actus interveniens) between the stabbing and her death.

== Appeal as to homicide on the basis of causation ==
The defence and court system saw an appeal heard within 9 months, with its judgment pronounced a month later, and did not dispute the second-count wounding conviction (resulting from a separate charge).

Lawton LJ (the most senior judge on the panel) ruled that, as a matter of public policy, "those who use violence on others must take their victims as they find them," invoking the thin-skull rule. The defendant's conviction of manslaughter was upheld.

== See also ==
- Jehovah's Witnesses and blood transfusions
