= Approved Premises =

British residential units for ex-offenders

In the United Kingdom, Approved Premises (AP), formerly known as probation or bail hostels, are residential units which house ex-offenders in the community. They are recognised under the Offender Management Act 2007. There are one hundred such hostels in England and Wales, and a further six in Northern Ireland. Fourteen of the APs in England and Wales were banned from housing child sex offenders in 2006 following a media campaign, which has led to some criticism.

== Description ==
Formerly known as either probation or bail hostels, the properties became known as Approved Premises once recognised under section 13 of the Offender Management Act 2007. They are still commonly called bail hostels in the media, although they house few offenders actually on bail with the majority of residents made up of those on release from prison on licence. There are one hundred Approved Premises in England and Wales, providing over two thousand residential bed spaces for offenders in the community, with a normal hostel holding between twelve and thirty offenders. They are run by either voluntary organisations or the National Probation Service, and may house high risk offenders. In 2006, fourteen of the hundred hostels were banned by the Ministry of Justice from housing child sex offenders after a media campaign due to those hostels' proximity to schools and nurseries. This has shown to have had an effect on housing such offenders, and in some cases they have been released without proper supervision, and in one case led to a child sex offender being housed temporarily in a Premier Inn hotel. In addition, the clustering of APs in certain areas have led to them being blamed for the increasing numbers of registered sex offenders in the surrounding areas.

While staff provide support to the offenders and run programmes to address offending issues, they do not conduct searches of individual offenders and will use local police assistance as necessary. A staff to resident ratio of one to five is typical, with most staff made up of trained professionals, while night time staff may be from private security firms.

Approved Premises are also run in Northern Ireland, which had six APs as of 2008. A report looked into the APs in Northern Ireland during 2008, and reported on their uneven distribution throughout the region and the volume of work conducted by staff. All of the Northern Irish APs are run by voluntary or community providers.

== Local opposition ==
There can be opposition to locating an Approved Premises in a community, with certain communities mounting protests against them. A particularly long running campaign has been run against an AP in Stonall Road, Aldridge by the local residents. Local media in that case have highlighted when high-profile offenders, including child sex offenders, have been resident. Reports have shown that local opposition is a major obstacle to opening APs in new locations, and although expansion schemes have been announced in the past, the current number of hostels has remained relatively stable in the last five years. Official spokespersons have said that "Approved Premises are safer for the public than the alternative which is to disperse such offenders in the local community immediately after release, making supervision much less effective."

BBC documentary Panorama investigated the Brigstocke Road and Ashley Road hostels in Bristol during November 2006. The program showed a child sex offender interacting with children, and even bringing one into his room at the hostel. Brigstocke Road was identified as a property near to a nursery and became one of the properties which later had a ban on it housing child sex offenders. Ashley House was unaffected.

== See also ==
- Halfway house
