= Criminal Justice and Courts Act 2015 =

Act of the Parliament of the United Kingdom

Criminal Justice and Courts Act 2015 (Note: Section 98.)
- Act of Parliament
- Parliament of the United Kingdom
- Long title: An Act to make provision about how offenders are dealt with before and after conviction; to create offences involving ill-treatment or wilful neglect by a person providing health care or social care; to create an offence of the corrupt or other improper exercise of police powers and privileges; to make provision about offences committed by disqualified drivers; to create an offence of disclosing private sexual photographs or films with intent to cause distress; to amend the offence of meeting a child following sexual grooming; to amend the offence of possession of extreme pornographic images; to make provision about the proceedings and powers of courts and tribunals; to make provision about judicial review; and for connected purposes.
- Citation: 2015 c. 2
- Introduced by: Chris Grayling MP, Secretary of State for Justice (Commons); Lord Faulks (Lords)
- Territorial extent: United Kingdom (Note: Section 96.)

Dates
- Royal assent: 12 February 2015
- Commencement: Various (Note: Section 95.)
Other legislation
Amends	Explosive Substances Act 1883; Children and Young Persons Act 1933; Prison Act 1952; Prevention of Crime Act 1953; Criminal Justice Act 1961; Children and Young Persons Act 1963; Criminal Justice Act 1967; Firearms Act 1968; Administration of Justice Act 1969; Administration of Justice Act 1970; Juries Act 1974; Rehabilitation of Offenders Act 1974; Criminal Law Act 1977; Magistrates' Courts Act 1980; Contempt of Court Act 1981; Senior Courts Act 1981; Criminal Justice Act 1982; Mental Health Act 1983; Police and Criminal Evidence Act 1984; Prosecution of Offences Act 1985; Insolvency Act 1986; Malicious Communications Act 1988; Criminal Justice Act 1988; Road Traffic Act 1988; Road Traffic Offenders Act 1988; Town and Country Planning Act 1990; Planning (Listed Buildings and Conservation Areas) Act 1990; Planning (Hazardous Substances) Act 1990; Criminal Justice Act 1991; Water Industry Act 1991; Pension Schemes Act 1993; Vehicle Excise and Registration Act 1994; Criminal Justice and Public Order Act 1994; Drug Trafficking Act 1994; Prisoners (Return to Custody) Act 1995; Merchant Shipping Act 1995; Employment Tribunals Act 1996; Crime (Sentences) Act 1997; Special Immigration Appeals Commission Act 1997; Crime and Disorder Act 1998; Scotland Act 1998; Youth Justice and Criminal Evidence Act 1999; Terrorism Act 2000; Education Act 2002; Powers of Criminal Courts (Sentencing) Act 2000; Criminal Justice and Court Services Act 2000; Private Security Industry Act 2001; Proceeds of Crime Act 2002; Communications Act 2003; Criminal Justice Act 2003; Crime (International Co-operation) Act 2003; Courts Act 2003; Sexual Offences Act 2003; Planning and Compulsory Purchase Act 2004; Domestic Violence, Crime and Victims Act 2004; Children Act 2004; Constitutional Reform Act 2005; Mental Capacity Act 2005; Terrorism Act 2006; Childcare Act 2006; Education and Inspections Act 2006; Armed Forces Act 2006; Tribunals, Courts and Enforcement Act 2007; Offender Management Act 2007; Corporate Manslaughter and Corporate Homicide Act 2007; Criminal Justice and Immigration Act 2008; Policing and Crime Act 2009; Coroners and Justice Act 2009; Equality Act 2010; Legal Aid, Sentencing and Punishment of Offenders Act 2012; Prisons (Interference with Wireless Telegraphy) Act 2012; Social Services and Well-being (Wales) Act 2014
Amended by	Regulation and Inspection of Social Care (Wales) Act 2016 (Consequential Amendments) Regulations 2019; Sentencing Act 2020; Local Government and Elections (Wales) Act 2021 (Consequential Amendments) Regulations 2021; Police, Crime, Sentencing and Courts Act 2022; Criminal Justice Act 2003 (Commencement No. 33) and Sentencing Act 2020 (Commencement No. 2) Regulations 2022; Curriculum and Assessment (Wales) Act 2021 (Consequential Amendments) (Primary Legislation) Regulations 2022; Online Safety Act 2023; Judicial Review and Courts Act 2022 (Magistrates’ Court Sentencing Powers) Regulations 2023Health and Social Care (Wales) Act 2025; Sentencing Act 2026

Status: Amended

Text of statute as originally enacted

Revised text of statute as amended

The Criminal Justice and Courts Act 2015 (c. 2) is an act of the Parliament of the United Kingdom which made a number of changes to the criminal justice system. It was introduced to the House of Commons on 5 February 2014 by Lord Chancellor Chris Grayling and received royal assent on 12 February 2015.

== Provisions ==
The act's provisions include the following:

- Imposing the payment of a charge of up to £600 on those convicted of a criminal offence at the point of conviction.
- Making jury misconduct a specific criminal offence with a penalty of up to two years in prison. Four new misconduct laws were included to prevent jurors conducting any research into details of a case, sharing details of the research with other jurors, disclosing details of juror deliberation, and "engaging in other prohibited conduct" such as using evidence not put before the court to decide a case. These are already offences under the Contempt of Court Act 1981.
- Raising the maximum age of jurors to 75 (from 70).
- Amending the extreme pornography law to ban the possession of pornographic images depicting acts of rape.
- Introducing a new offence of being "unlawfully at large" with a punishment of up to two years in prison for criminals who go on the run while serving the non-custodial element of their sentence.
- Making the offence of causing death by driving while disqualified indictable only and increasing the maximum sentence from 12 months to 10 years.
- Abolishing automatic early release for those convicted of serious terrorism charges or child rape.
- Ending police cautions for child pornography offences or supplying class A drugs as well as in those cases where an offender has been cautioned or convicted for a similar offence in the previous two years.
- Allowing single magistrates (rather than a bench of two or three) to preside over "low-level regulatory cases". This provision also allows certain offences to be dealt with by a single magistrate outside the courtroom.
- Creating "secure colleges", a new form of secure educational establishment for young offenders. The first "pathfinder secure college" is expected to open in the East Midlands in 2017.
- Restricting the judicial review process to specialist courts working to fixed timetables where only individuals or groups with a financial interest in a case can bring a challenge rather than general issue-based campaigning groups.
- Making a whole life order the starting point for murder in the case of the murder of a police or prison officer in the course of their duties.

== Amendments ==
- The March 2014 amendment modified the Malicious Communications Act 1988 and Section 127 of the Communications Act 2003. The maximum length of custodial sentencing for online harassment was increased from six months to two years, and magistrates gained the power to pass cases on to the Crown Court.
- The October 2014 amendment created a specific offence of distributing a private sexual image of someone without their consent and with the intention of causing them distress (commonly called "revenge porn"). The maximum custodial sentence is two years.

== In committee ==
In April 2014 the assistant director of the British Board of Film Classification told a Parliamentary Bill Committee that the Clause 16 proposal to criminalise rape pornography would not result in the blocking of scenes of sexual imagery that bear no relation to reality.

In June 2014 the parliamentary Joint Committee on Human Rights claimed that the bill's proposals to allow staff in "secure colleges" to use "reasonable force where necessary to ensure good order and discipline" would contravene the European Convention on Human Rights.

== See also ==
- Criminal Justice and Immigration Act 2008
- Backlash (pressure group)
