= Offender Management Act 2007 =

Act of the Parliament of the United Kingdom

Offender Management Act 2007 (Note: Section 42.)
- Act of Parliament
- Parliament of the United Kingdom
- Long title: An Act to make provision about the provision of probation services, prisons and other matters relating to the management of offenders; and for connected purposes.
- Citation: 2007 c. 21
- Introduced by: John Reid MP, Home Secretary (Commons); Baroness Scotland of Asthal (Lords)
- Territorial extent: England and Wales; Scotland (in part); Northern Ireland (in part); (Note: Section 40.)

Dates
- Royal assent: 26 July 2007
- Commencement: Various (Note: Section 41.)
Other legislation
Amends	Criminal Justice and Court Services Act 2000; Public Audit (Wales) Act 2004
Amended by	Criminal Justice and Immigration Act 2008; Criminal Justice and Courts Act 2015; Sentencing Act 2020; Domestic Abuse Act 2021; Sentencing Act 2026

Status: Amended

History of passage through Parliament

Text of statute as originally enacted

Revised text of statute as amended

The Offender Management Act 2007 (c. 21) is an act of the Parliament of the United Kingdom which relates to "the provision of probation services, prisons and other matters relating to the management of offenders".

== Provisions ==
The act allows for the outsourcing of probation services (section 3) and amend the law relating to contracted out prisons and secure training centres (sections 16-20).

The act allowed more options for the placement of young offenders in care homes.

The act introduced provision for the monitoring of sex offenders on parole using lie detectors (polygraphs). The Counter-Terrorism and Sentencing Act 2021 amended these provisions to allow the use of polygraph testing for acts of terrorism. The Police, Crime, Sentencing and Courts Act 2022 further extended polygraph testing to cover members of the armed forces who are convicted for "service offences" (offences under the relevant military laws) that match up to the equivalent offences in ordinary criminal law. The Crime and Policing Act 2026 has further extended the criteria under which polygraph testing can be used for offenders who have been convicted of murder who are deemed to be at risk of committing a sexual offence, or for offenders who committed a sexual offence in the past and are released on licence for a different offence.

The act makes it an offence to have a mobile phone in prison and it makes it an offence for staff to bring mobile phones into a prison.
