= Criminal Justice and Court Services Act 2000 =

Act of the Parliament of the United Kingdom

Criminal Justice and Court Services Act 2000 (Note: Section 82.)
- Act of Parliament
- Parliament of the United Kingdom
- Long title: An Act to establish a National Probation Service for England and Wales and a Children and Family Court Advisory and Support Service; to make further provision for the protection of children; to make further provision about dealing with persons suspected of, charged with or convicted of offences; to amend the law relating to access to information held under Part III of the Road Traffic Act 1988; and for connected purposes.
- Citation: 2000 c. 43
- Territorial extent: England and Wales; Scotland (in part); Northern Ireland (in part); (Note: Section 80.)

Dates
- Royal assent: 30 November 2000
- Commencement: Various (Note: Section 81.)
Other legislation
Amends	Pensions (Increase) Act 1971; House of Commons Disqualification Act 1975; Bail Act 1976; Domestic Proceedings and Magistrates' Courts Act 1978; Protection of Children Act 1978
Repeals/revokes	Probation Service Act 1993
Amended by	Adoption and Children Act 2002; Courts Act 2003; Asylum and Immigration (Treatment of Claimants, etc.) Act 2004; Domestic Violence, Crime and Victims Act 2004; Children Act 2004; Drugs Act 2005; National Health Service (Consequential Provisions) Act 2006; Safeguarding Vulnerable Groups Act 2006; Armed Forces Act 2006; Offender Management Act 2007; Legal Services Act 2007; Criminal Justice and Immigration Act 2008; Charities Act 2011; Domestic Violence, Crime and Victims (Amendment) Act 2012; Criminal Justice and Courts Act 2015; Sentencing Act 2020; Mental Health Act 2025; Sentencing Act 2026

Status: Amended

Text of statute as originally enacted

Revised text of statute as amended

The Criminal Justice and Court Services Act 2000 (c. 43) is an act of the Parliament of the United Kingdom that advances a number of agendas related to criminal justice. It instituted the National Probation Service as well as the Children and Family Court Advisory and Support Service. The act also makes the parents of persistent truants criminally liable and subject to a maximum penalty of three months in prison, a legal change that led to the first imprisonment of parents in 2002.

The act formally removes the role of the Home Secretary in sentencing young people for serious crimes (such as murder) following the decisions by the House of Lords in R v Secretary of State for the Home Dept ex parte Venables and Thompson (1997) and the subsequent case at the European Court of Human Rights, T. v United Kingdom. The European Court of Human Rights had found that the right to a fair trial guaranteed by the Convention had been infringed in the cases of Robert Thompson and Jon Venables (the murderers of James Bulger) by having sentences determined by the serving Home Secretary, a political appointee. §60 of the act assigns the power to sentence people under 18 who are tried as adults for serious crimes with the trial judge rather than the Home Secretary.

The act introduced a number of drugs-related provisions including drug abstinence orders, a community-based sentence that allows a court to order an offender to abstain from specified class A drugs. It also allows for pre-sentence drug testing of convicted offenders, as well as drug testing of people held in police custody.
