= Local education authorities in England and Wales =

Local councils responsible for education

Local education authorities (LEAs) were defined in England and Wales as the local councils responsible for education within their jurisdictions. The term was introduced by the Education Act 1902, which transferred education powers from school boards to existing local councils.

There have been periodic changes to the types of councils defined as local education authorities. Initially, they were the councils of counties and county boroughs. From 1974 the local education authorities were the county councils in non-metropolitan areas and the district councils in metropolitan areas. In Greater London, the ad hoc Inner London Education Authority existed from 1965 to 1990. Outer London borough councils have been LEAs since 1965 and inner London borough councils since 1990. Unitary authorities created since 1995 have all been LEAs.

The functions of LEAs have varied over time as council responsibilities for local education have changed. On 1 April 2009, their powers were transferred to directors of children's services. The Children Act 2004 required every London borough, metropolitan district, top-tier local authority (county) or UA in England to appoint a director of children's services. The Education and Inspections Act 2006 includes a clause that allows for the future renaming of LEAs as local authorities in all legislation, removing the anomaly of one local authority being known as an LEA and a children's services authority.

== History ==
=== Creation ===
The term was introduced by the Education Act 1902 (2 Edw. 7. c. 42). The legislation designated each local authority; either county council and county borough council; would set up a committee known as a local education authority (LEA). The councils took over the powers and responsibilities of the school boards and technical instruction committees in their area.

Municipal boroughs with a population of 10,000 and urban districts with a population of 20,000 were to be local education authorities in their areas for elementary education only.

In 1904 the London County Council became a local education authority, with the abolition of the London School Board. The metropolitan boroughs within London were not education authorities, although they were given the power to decide on the site for new schools in their areas, and provided the majority of members on boards of management.

The LEAs' role was further expanded with the introduction of school meals in 1906 and medical inspection in 1907.

=== Reform ===
The Education Act 1944 changed the requirements for delegation of functions from county councils to districts and boroughs. The population requirement for excepted districts became 60,000 or 7,000 pupils registered in elementary schools. The Local Government Act 1958 permitted any county district to apply for excepted district status.

In 1965 the London County Council, Middlesex County Council and the councils of the county boroughs of Croydon, East Ham and West Ham were replaced by the Greater London Council. The twenty outer London boroughs became local education authorities, while a new Inner London Education Authority, consisting of the members of the GLC elected for the twelve inner London boroughs covering the former County of London was created.

In 1974 local government outside London was completely reorganised. In the new metropolitan counties of England and Wales, metropolitan boroughs became LEAs. In the non-metropolitan counties the county councils were the education authorities.

In 1986, with the abolition of the Greater London Council, the Inner London Education Authority became directly elected. This however only lasted until 1990, when the twelve inner London boroughs assumed responsibility for education.

In 1989, under the Education Reform Act 1988, the LEAs lost responsibility for further education, with all polytechnics and colleges of higher education becoming independent corporations.

A further wave of local government reorganisation during the 1990s led to the formation of unitary authorities in parts of England and throughout Wales, which became local education authorities.

=== Redefinition ===
The Children Act 2004 defined each local education authority as additionally a children's services authority, with responsibility for both functions held by the director of children's services.

=== Ending ===
==== England ====
The Local Education Authorities and Children's Services Authorities (Integration of Functions) Order 2010 removed all reference to local education authorities and children's services authorities from existing legislation, replacing them with the term 'local authority'. A local authority for the purposes of the Education Act 1996 and the Children Act 2004 was defined as the county council, metropolitan district council, unitary authority, London borough council and the Common Council of the City of London. Schedule 1 of the order inserted in the Education Act 1996 a list of 'education functions' for the relevant local authorities. Despite the term becoming obsolete, 'local education authority' continues to be used to distinguish local authorities with education functions from those without them.

==== Wales ====
In Wales the councils of the counties and county boroughs are responsible for education. Since 5 May 2010, the terms local education authority and children's services authority have been repealed and replaced by the single term 'local authority' in both primary and secondary legislation.

== Functions ==
Local education authorities had some responsibility for all state schools in their area.

- They were responsible for distribution and monitoring of funding for the schools
- They were responsible for co-ordination of admissions, including allocation of the number of places available at each school
- They were the direct employers of all staff in community and VC schools
- They had a responsibility for the educational achievement of looked-after children, i.e. children in their care
- They had attendance and advisory rights in relation to the employment of teachers, and in relation to the dismissal of any staff
- They were the owners of school land and premises in community schools.

Until recently, local education authorities were responsible for the funding of students in higher education (for example undergraduate courses and PGCE) whose permanent address is in their area, regardless of the place of study. Based on an assessment of individual circumstances they offer grants or access to student loans through the Student Loans Company.

=== Education functions ===
Statutory education functions for local authorities in England were as follows:

- Making of byelaws relating to the employment of children.
- Payment of injury benefit to or in respect of teachers.
- Powers and duties relating to careers services
- Duty to provide information to the Secretary of State.
- General duty to secure that facilities for education are provided without sex discrimination.
- Power to use a school bus to carry fare-paying passengers.
- Duty to prepare and revise lists of rooms in school premises which candidates may use.
- Duty to require the appropriate officer to give an opinion as to whether a child with a statement is disabled.
- Education supervision orders.
- Duty to secure that disabled pupils are not placed at a substantial disadvantage.
- Duty to prepare an accessibility strategy.
- Duty (as responsible body) to prepare an accessibility plan.
- Duty relating to the provision of independent advocacy services
- Duties as an "authorised body" relating to qualifications.
- Duty to arrange assessments relating to learning difficulties.
- Duty to implement approved proposals relating to sixth forms.
- Duty to include certain persons on overview and scrutiny committee if it relates to education functions.
- Powers and duties relating to education of a child in an accommodation centre.
- Powers and duties relating to parenting orders and parenting contracts.
- Duty to make available to the Secretary of State appropriate accommodation for enabling the Secretary of State to arrange for medical inspections in schools.

== Relevant local authority ==
England has several tiers of local government and the relevant local authority varies. Within Greater London the 32 London borough councils and the Common Council of the City of London are the local authorities responsible for education; in the metropolitan counties it is the 36 metropolitan borough councils; and in the non-metropolitan counties it is the 21 county councils or, where there is no county council, the councils of the 62 unitary authorities. The Council of the Isles of Scilly is an education authority. There are 153 local education authorities in England.

=== List of local authorities responsible for education ===
There are currently 153 local education authorities in England. Below they are listed alphabetically by region.

London
- Barking and Dagenham London Borough Council
- Barnet London Borough Council
- Bexley London Borough Council
- Brent London Borough Council
- Bromley London Borough Council
- Camden London Borough Council
- City of London Corporation
- Croydon London Borough Council
- Ealing London Borough Council
- Enfield London Borough Council
- Greenwich London Borough Council
- Hackney London Borough Council
- Hammersmith and Fulham London Borough Council
- Haringey London Borough Council
- Harrow London Borough Council
- Havering London Borough Council
- Hillingdon London Borough Council
- Hounslow London Borough Council
- Islington London Borough Council
- Kensington and Chelsea London Borough Council
- Kingston upon Thames London Borough Council
- Lambeth London Borough Council
- Lewisham London Borough Council
- Merton London Borough Council
- Newham London Borough Council
- Redbridge London Borough Council
- Richmond upon Thames London Borough Council
- Southwark London Borough Council
- Sutton London Borough Council
- Tower Hamlets London Borough Council
- Waltham Forest London Borough Council
- Wandsworth London Borough Council
- Westminster City Council
South West
- Bath and North East Somerset Council
- Bournemouth, Christchurch and Poole Council
- Bristol City Council
- Cornwall Council
- Devon County Council
- Dorset Council (UK)
- Gloucestershire County Council
- Council of the Isles of Scilly
- North Somerset Council
- Plymouth City Council
- Somerset Council
- South Gloucestershire Council
- Swindon Borough Council
- Torbay Council
- Wiltshire Council
South East
- Bracknell Forest Borough Council
- Brighton and Hove City Council
- Buckinghamshire Council
- East Sussex County Council
- Hampshire County Council
- Isle of Wight Council
- Kent County Council
- Medway Council
- Milton Keynes Borough Council
- Oxfordshire County Council
- Portsmouth City Council
- Reading Borough Council
- Slough Borough Council
- Southampton City Council
- Surrey County Council
- West Berkshire Council
- West Sussex County Council
- Windsor and Maidenhead Borough Council
- Wokingham Borough Council
East
- Bedford Borough Council
- Cambridgeshire County Council
- Central Bedfordshire Council
- Essex County Council
- Hertfordshire County Council
- Luton Borough Council
- Norfolk County Council
- Peterborough City Council
- Southend-on-Sea City Council
- Suffolk County Council
- Thurrock Borough Council
West Midlands
- Birmingham City Council
- Coventry City Council
- Dudley Metropolitan Borough Council
- County of Herefordshire District Council
- Sandwell Metropolitan Borough Council
- Shropshire Council
- Solihull Metropolitan Borough Council
- Staffordshire County Council
- Stoke-on-Trent City Council
- Telford and Wrekin Borough Council
- Walsall Metropolitan Borough Council
- Warwickshire County Council
- Wolverhampton City Council
- Worcestershire County Council
East Midlands
- Derby City Council
- Derbyshire County Council
- Leicester City Council
- Leicestershire County Council
- Lincolnshire County Council
- North Northamptonshire Council
- Nottingham City Council
- Nottinghamshire County Council
- Rutland County Council
- West Northamptonshire Council
Yorkshire and the Humber
- Barnsley Metropolitan Borough Council
- City of Bradford Metropolitan District Council
- Calderdale Metropolitan Borough Council
- Doncaster Metropolitan Borough Council
- East Riding of Yorkshire Council
- Hull City Council
- Kirklees Metropolitan Borough Council
- Leeds City Council
- North East Lincolnshire Council
- North Lincolnshire Council
- North Yorkshire Council
- Rotherham Metropolitan Borough Council
- Sheffield City Council
- Wakefield Metropolitan District Council
- York City Council
North West
- Blackburn with Darwen Borough Council
- Blackpool Borough Council
- Bolton Metropolitan Borough Council
- Bury Metropolitan Borough Council
- Cheshire East Council
- Cheshire West and Chester Council
- Cumberland Council
- Halton Borough Council
- Knowsley Metropolitan Borough Council
- Lancashire County Council
- Liverpool City Council
- Manchester City Council
- Oldham Metropolitan Borough Council
- Rochdale Metropolitan Borough Council
- Salford City Council
- Sefton Metropolitan Borough Council
- St Helens Metropolitan Borough Council
- Stockport Metropolitan Borough Council
- Tameside Metropolitan Borough Council
- Trafford Metropolitan Borough Council
- Warrington Borough Council
- Westmorland and Furness Council
- Wigan Metropolitan Borough Council
- Wirral Metropolitan Borough Council
North East
- Darlington Borough Council
- Durham County Council
- Gateshead Metropolitan Borough Council
- Hartlepool Borough Council
- Middlesbrough Borough Council
- North Tyneside Metropolitan Borough Council
- Northumberland County Council
- Newcastle upon Tyne City Council
- Redcar and Cleveland Borough Council
- South Tyneside Metropolitan Borough Council
- Stockton-on-Tees Borough Council
- Sunderland City Council
Wales
- Isle of Anglesey County Council
- Blaenau Gwent County Borough Council
- Bridgend County Borough Council
- Caerphilly County Borough Council
- Cardiff Council
- Carmarthenshire County Council
- Ceredigion County Council
- Conwy County Borough Council
- Denbighshire County Council
- Flintshire County Council
- Gwynedd Council
- Merthyr Tydfil County Borough Council
- Monmouthshire County Council
- Neath Port Talbot County Borough Council
- Newport City Council
- Pembrokeshire County Council
- Powys County Council
- Rhondda Cynon Taf County Borough Council
- City and County of Swansea council
- Torfaen County Borough Council
- Vale of Glamorgan Council
- Wrexham County Borough Council

== See also ==
- Special education
- Dyslexia support in the United Kingdom
