= Prevention of Social Housing Fraud Act 2013 =

Act of the Parliament of the United Kingdom

Prevention of Social Housing Fraud Act 2013 (Note: Section 12(6).)
- Act of Parliament
- Parliament of the United Kingdom
- Long title: An Act to create offences and make other provision relating to sub-letting and parting with possession of social housing; to make provision about the investigation of social housing fraud; and for connected purposes.
- Citation: 2013 c. 3
- Introduced by: Richard Harrington MP (Commons); Baroness Eaton (Lords)
- Territorial extent: England and Wales (Note: Section 12(1).)

Dates
- Royal assent: 31 January 2013
- Commencement: England: 14 October 2013 (Note: Section 12(3). The Prevention of Social Housing Fraud Act 2013 (Commencement) (England) Order 2013.); 4 November 2013 (Note: Section 12(3). The Prevention of Social Housing Fraud Act 2013 (Commencement) (Wales) Order 2013.)
Other legislation
Amends	Administration of Justice Act 1970
Amended by	Modern Slavery Act 2015; Sentencing Act 2020
Relates to	Housing Act 1988

Status: Amended

History of passage through Parliament

Text of statute as originally enacted

Revised text of statute as amended

The Prevention of Social Housing Fraud Act 2013 (c. 3) is an act of the Parliament of the United Kingdom which will create offences and make other provision relating to sub-letting and parting with possession of social housing and for connected purposes.

== Passage ==
The act was passed as a private member's bill.

== Provisions ==
The act creates two new offences:

- The subletting or subletting of parts with possession of a property or ceasing to occupy knowing that it is a breach of tenancy
- The subletting or subletting of a property in breach of a tenancy by a tenant, dishonestly
