= Childcare Act 2006 =

Act of the Parliament of the United Kingdom

Childcare Act 2006 (Note: Section 111(1).)
- Act of Parliament
- Parliament of the United Kingdom
- Long title: An Act to make provision about the powers and duties of local authorities and other bodies in England in relation to the improvement of the well-being of young children; to make provision about the powers and duties of local authorities in England and Wales in relation to the provision of childcare and the provision of information to parents and other persons; to make provision about the regulation and inspection of childcare provision in England; to amend Part 10A of the Children Act 1989 in relation to Wales; and for connected purposes.
- Citation: 2006 c. 21
- Territorial extent: England and Wales, except that any amendment or repeal made by this act has the same extent as the provision amended or repealed. (Note: Section 111(2)–(3).)

Dates
- Royal assent: 11 July 2006
- Commencement: Various (Note: Section 109.)
Other legislation
| Amends | Magistrates' Courts Act 1980; Senior Courts Act 1981; Children Act 1989; Water Industry Act 1991; Education Act 1996 |
| Amended by | Safeguarding Vulnerable Groups Act 2006; Criminal Justice and Courts Act 2015; Sentencing Act 2020 |
| Relates to | Children and Adoption Act 2006 |

Status: Amended

History of passage through Parliament

Text of statute as originally enacted

Revised text of statute as amended

The Childcare Act 2006 (c. 21) is an act of the Parliament of the United Kingdom.

== Provisions ==
The act defines new duties for local authorities with respect to:

- improving the Every Child Matters outcomes for pre-school children
- childcare for working parents
- parental information services

== Structure of the act ==
The act comprises four sections:

- Part 1 - duties on local authorities in England
- Part 2 - duties on local authorities in Wales
- Part 3 - regulation and inspection arrangements for childcare providers in England
- Part 4 - general provisions

== Provisions ==
The act established a reformed legal framework for regulation and inspection of all early years settings.

The act requires local authorities to provide sufficient childcare to meet the needs of working parents with regards to those with disabled children or those on low incomes.

=== Early Years Foundation Stage ===
Sections 39-48 introduce the Early Years Foundation Stage (EYFS) which supports the delivery of high quality education and care for children from birth to age 5.

== Reception ==
While broadly supporting the original version of the bill, the children's charities 4Children, the Daycare Trust, the National Childminding Association and the Pre-School criticised the lack of provisions for unemployed individuals.

== Section 109 – Commencement ==
The following orders have been made under this section:

- The Childcare Act 2006 (Commencement No. 1) Order 2006 (S.I. 2006/3360 (C. 121))
- The Childcare Act 2006 (Commencement No. 2 and Savings and Transitional Provisions) Order 2007 (S.I. 2007/1019 (C. 41))
- The Childcare Act 2006 (Commencement No. 3 and Transitional Provision) Order 2007 (S.I. 2007/2717 (C. 106))
- The Childcare Act 2006 (Commencement No. 4) Order 2008 (S.I. 2008/785 (C. 35))
- The Childcare Act 2006 (Commencement No. 5 and Savings and Transitional Provisions) Order 2008 (S.I. 2008/2261 (C. 101))
- The Childcare Act 2006 (Commencement No. 1) (Wales) Order 2008 (S.I. 2008/17 (W. 6))
