= Police, Crime, Sentencing and Courts Act 2022 =

Act of the Parliament of the United Kingdom

Police, Crime, Sentencing and Courts Act 2022 (Note: Section 209.)
- Act of Parliament
- Parliament of the United Kingdom
- Long title: An Act to make provision about the police and other emergency workers; to make provision about collaboration between authorities to prevent and reduce serious violence; to make provision about offensive weapons homicide reviews; to make provision for new offences and for the modification of existing offences; to make provision about the powers of the police and other authorities for the purposes of preventing, detecting, investigating or prosecuting crime or investigating other matters; to make provision about the maintenance of public order; to make provision about the removal, storage and disposal of vehicles; to make provision in connection with driving offences; to make provision about cautions; to make provision about bail and remand; to make provision about sentencing, detention, release, management and rehabilitation of offenders; to make provision about secure 16 to 19 Academies; to make provision for and in connection with procedures before courts and tribunals; and for connected purposes.
- Citation: 2022 c. 32
- Introduced by: Robert Buckland, Lord High Chancellor of Great Britain (Commons); Baroness Williams of Trafford, Minister of State for Home Affairs (Lords)
- Territorial extent: England and Wales; Scotland (in part); Northern Ireland (in part); (Note: Section 207.)

Dates
- Royal assent: 28 April 2022
- Commencement: various (Note: Section 208.)
Other legislation
Amends	Night Poaching Act 1828; Juries Act 1974; Magistrates' Courts Act 1980; Criminal Justice Act 1988; Football Spectators Act 1989; Criminal Procedure (Scotland) Act 1995; Police Act 1996; Crime and Disorder Act 1998; Terrorism Act 2000; International Criminal Court Act 2001; Domestic Violence, Crime and Victims Act 2004; Criminal Justice and Immigration Act 2008; Counter-Terrorism Act 2008; Protection of Freedoms Act 2012; Police Reform and Social Responsibility Act 2011; Legal Aid, Sentencing and Punishment of Offenders Act 2012; Criminal Justice and Courts Act 2015; Policing and Crime Act 2017; Assaults on Emergency Workers (Offences) Act 2018; Offensive Weapons Act 2019; Sentencing Act 2020; Domestic Abuse Act 2021
Repeals/revokes	Vagrancy Act 1824
Amended by	Health and Care Act 2022; Judicial Review and Courts Act 2022 (Magistrates’ Court Sentencing Powers) Regulations 2023; Police, Crime, Sentencing and Courts Act 2022 (Extraction of information from electronic devices) (Amendment of Schedule 3) Regulations 2023; Secretaries of State for Energy Security and Net Zero, for Science, Innovation and Technology, for Business and Trade, and for Culture, Media and Sport and the Transfer of Functions (National Security and Investment Act 2021 etc) Order 2023; Victims and Prisoners Act 2024; Employment Rights Act 2025; Sentencing Act 2026

Status: Amended

History of passage through Parliament

Records of Parliamentary debate relating to the statute from Hansard

Text of statute as originally enacted

Revised text of statute as amended

The Police, Crime, Sentencing and Courts Act 2022 (c. 32) is an act of the Parliament of the United Kingdom that was introduced by the Home Office and the Ministry of Justice. It gives more power to the police, criminal justice, and sentencing legislation, and it encompasses restrictions on "unacceptable" protests, crimes against children, and sentencing limits. It was passed by the Houses of Parliament on 26 April 2022 and received royal assent on 28 April 2022.

The UK Government describe the act as:

The act implements a recommendation by the Law Commission to introduce a statutory offence of public nuisance and abolish the existing common law offence. This will provide clarity to the police and potential offenders, giving clear notice of what conduct is forbidden.

The act reduced the maximum sentence for public nuisance offences from life imprisonment to 10 years imprisonment. The new law also allows senior police officers to give directions and impose conditions, including beginning and end times of protests, on those organising or taking part in either a procession or assembly that the police decide are necessary to prevent disorder, damage, disruption, noise impact or intimidation.

The law is controversial, and led to protests under the slogan "Kill the Bill" in various British cities before it had come into force. It has received fierce criticism both locally and internationally by various politicians, human rights groups, journalists and academics, due to the impact on free expression, freedom of speech and the right to protest in the United Kingdom. Amnesty International referred to the bill as a "dark day for civil liberties" and "deeply-authoritarian". Measures that were rejected in this bill by the House of Lords, which gave further powers such as banning individuals from protests outright, were reintroduced the following year under the Public Order Act 2023 and came into force.

== Background ==
=== Control of protests ===
Since 2019, there have been significant direct action campaigns by pressure groups in the UK. In April and October 2019, large protests were held by Extinction Rebellion, and the Black Lives Matter movement held large protests in the summer of 2020. In autumn 2021, significant protests were conducted by Insulate Britain.

Some of these protests have involved disruptive direct action. The bill can be viewed as in response to Extinction Rebellion protests, whose activists used adhesives to attach themselves to public transport vehicles. In June 2020, the statue of philanthropist and slave trader Edward Colston was toppled during a Black Lives Matter protest. The statue was a Grade II listed structure, although four individuals charged with criminal damage for removing the statue were found not guilty at Bristol Crown Court on 5 January 2022. Activists from Insulate Britain have used adhesives to attach themselves to the road surface at entrances to the M25 Motorway.

According to the UK Government "the National Police Chief’s Council have expressed concerns that existing public order legislation is outdated and no longer appropriate for responding to the highly disruptive protest tactics used by some groups today". The government have further stated that "the measures in the Police, Crime, Sentencing and Courts Bill will improve the police’s ability to manage such protests, enabling them to balance the rights of protesters against the rights of others to go about their daily business, and to dedicate their resources to keeping the public safe".

=== Tougher sentences for child cruelty and neglect ===
The adoptive family of Tony Hudgell, injured as an infant by his birth parents, started a campaign for tougher sentences for child cruelty and neglect, and their cause was taken up by their local MP for Tonbridge and Malling, Tom Tugendhat, who introduced a Child Cruelty (Sentences) Bill in the House of Commons in 2019. While this was not pursued, its core measures were incorporated in the Government's Bill.

== The act ==
The act was enacted in April 2022 and includes major proposals by the Johnson government to reform the criminal justice system. As criminal justice is largely a devolved matter, the provisions of the act primarily only extend to England and Wales, although some provisions apply to Scotland and Northern Ireland.

Provisions in the act include allowing judges to give whole life orders (life imprisonment with no possibility of parole) for the premeditated murder of a child; the maximum sentence for causing or allowing a child's death was increased from 14 years to life, while the maximum penalty for causing serious harm to a child was increased from 10 to 14 years. Judges could also give life sentences for drivers who kill behind the wheel. The maximum sentence for criminal damage to a memorial was increased from 3 months to 10 years.

The act expands police powers allowing officers widespread access to private education and health care records, and suspicionless stop and search. It contains trespass provisions, which make "residing on land without consent in or with a vehicle" a criminal offense. Under the new offence, a person can be criminalised for disobeying the instruction of a private citizen, which does not have to be made in writing. Following the bill's first defeat, the government added an amendment that would repeal the Vagrancy Act 1824 (5 Geo. 4. c. 83), described as "offensive and outdated". Harper's Law, which extends mandatory life sentences for manslaughter of an emergency worker on duty, was also included in the bill.

The act also makes statutory a code of practice for police recording of non-crime hate incidents.

=== Effects on public assembly ===
Part 3 of the act gives police forces broad authority to place restrictions on protests and public assembly. Under previous UK legislation, police must show that a protest may cause "serious public disorder, serious damage to property or serious disruption to the life of the community" before imposing any restrictions. Under this act, police forces are allowed to place restrictions on protests they believe would otherwise constitute an existing offence of public nuisance, including imposing starting and finishing times and noise limits, and be able to consider actions by one individual as protests under provisions of the act. Protestors disobeying such instructions from the police may be committing a criminal offence.

Home Office minister Victoria Atkins said the bill updates the Public Order Act 1986 and drew a distinction between peaceful protest and "activities which inhibit the lives of people". Robert Buckland, Secretary of State for Justice, said regarding the bill and protests: "We've got to think about the sometimes huge inconvenience caused to other people going about their lawful business."

== Response ==
The bill is controversial, prior to and after it was passed. It was welcomed by the Police Federation of England and Wales, while the Association of Police and Crime Commissioners (APCC), a group of elected officials in England and Wales, registered their disagreement with the bill. On the topic of proposed legally-binding restrictions on protests, the APCC chair Paddy Tipping stated: "I think politicians would be wise to leave decisions to the responsible people." Tipping added that "they've got to leave people to make local decisions in local circumstances." In March 2021, Michael Barton and Peter Fahy, the former chief constables of Durham Constabulary and Greater Manchester Police, respectively, said that the law threatened civil liberties and constituted a politically-motivated move towards paramilitary policing. The advocacy group Liberty said the bill "threatens protest". Broadcaster and writer Kenan Malik warned the bill reduced the right to protest to "whispering in the corner". David Blunkett, the Labour Party home secretary from 2001 to 2004, called it an "anti-protest bill" threatening to make Britain look like Vladimir Putin's Russia.

The bill was based on the 2019 report by the conservative Policy Exchange think tank, which received in 2017 a $30,000 donation by US-based oil and gas corporation ExxonMobil, to target Extinction Rebellion. After it was reported that other UK-based think tank have received donations by climate change deniers, Scottish National Party MP Alyn Smith commented this showed the UK's lobbying laws were not tough enough, saying: "He who pays the piper calls the tune. We urgently need to rewrite the laws governing this sort of sock puppet funding so that we can see who speaks for who." Green Party MP Caroline Lucas commented: "It appears that the Policing Bill is stained with the grubby, oil-soaked hands of the fossil fuel lobby. And no wonder – this cracks down on the fundamental rights of protestors to challenge the very climate-wrecking policies espoused by this downright dangerous industry." Priti Patel, who advocated for the policing bill, said it was intended to stop tactics used by Extinction Rebellion, which was falsely listed as an extremist group by the South East Counter Terrorism Unit, and continued to defend the decision after the guide was disowned in 2020. As of January 2022, despite initial "Kill the Bill" protests by grassroots groups, no mass movement opposing this bill has come together.

=== Protest and riot in Bristol ===
Thousands of protestors against the bill gathered in College Green in Bristol city centre on Sunday, 21 March 2021, in violation of COVID-19 restrictions. Some held placards reading "Kill the Bill" amongst other slogans. The protestors marched through the city centre without intervention, before a confrontation between police and a few hundred protestors staging a sit-in at Bridewell Police Station led to an outbreak of violence in which, it was claimed, two assaulted police officers were left with serious injuries. Police then retracted this statement after a statement from a police spokesperson falsely claimed officers were injured. Police vehicles were set alight and protestors were visually recorded attempting to set fire to a police vehicle with officers inside. Protestors set off fireworks, and the police station was graffitied and damaged by protesters.

Avon and Somerset Police retracted claims on 25 March that any officers suffered broken bones or punctured lungs. There was also controversy over the alleged assault of Daily Mirror journalist Matthew Dresch on 26 March, as video footage showed him being pushed and hit with a baton while stating that he was a journalist, which police appeared to acknowledge, as well as a woman in her 20s. Later a high-ranking officer with Avon and Somerset "extended apologies" for the incident.

==== Response ====
Bristol Mayor Marvin Rees said at the time that it was a "shameful day" for Bristol, and Andy Marsh, the then Chief Constable of Avon and Somerset Police, said the peaceful protest had been hijacked by "violent extremists and criminals".

An appeal was launched to identify people who had joined in the disorder, and a number of people were convicted as a result. The majority were convicted of rioting, but several were convicted of a different charge. As of 28 April 2022, fifteen people had been jailed in connection with the riot for a total of 57 years and 11 months.

=== Further protests ===
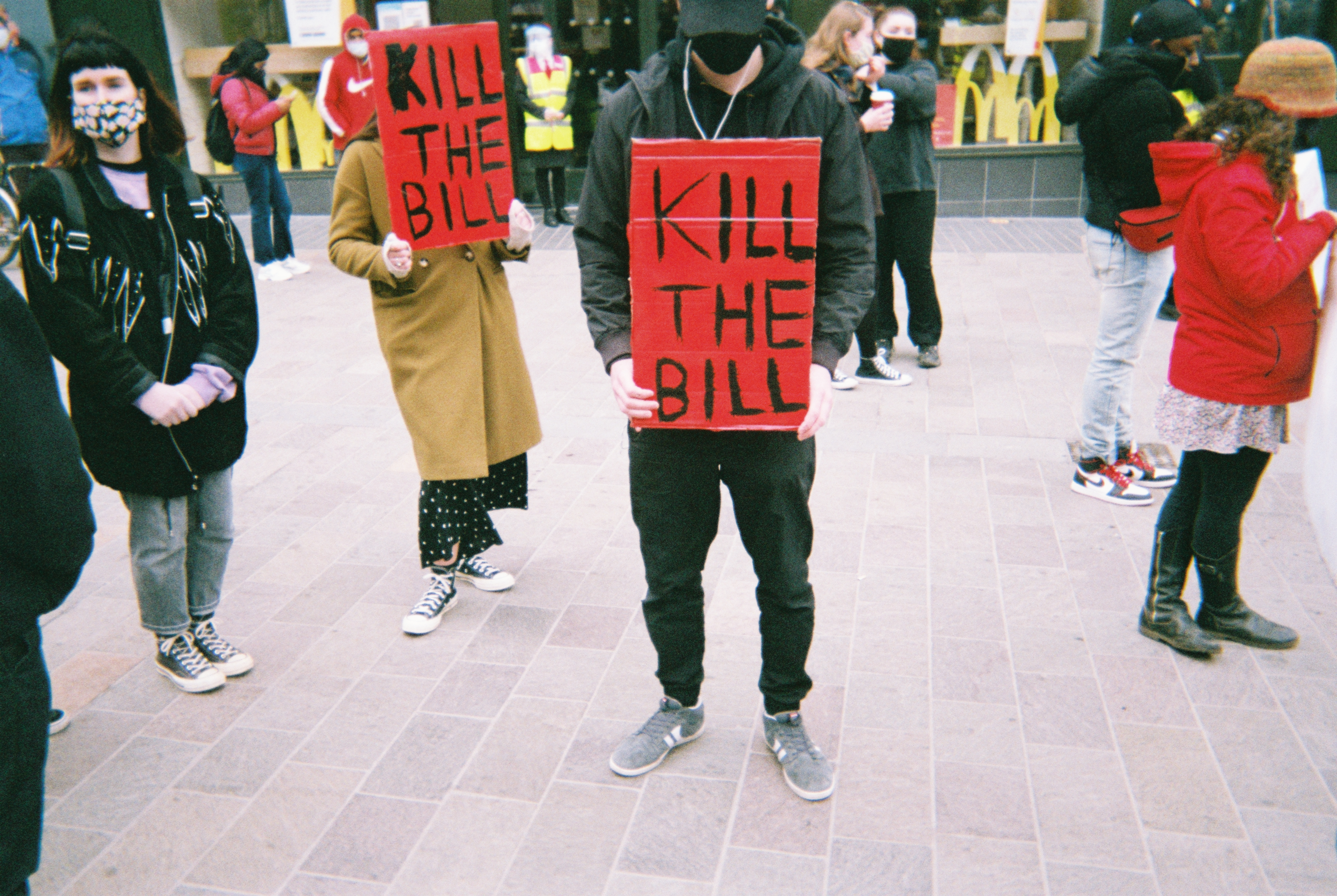
"Kill the Bill" protest in Leicester, April 2021

Subsequent "Kill the Bill" protests were held in Bristol on Tuesday 23 March, and Friday 26 March, and in Manchester and Sheffield, on 27 March 2021.

The Easter weekend saw protests in London, Bristol, Leicester, Guildford, Newcastle, Birmingham, Liverpool, Bournemouth, Brighton, Weymouth, and Luton. Advocacy group Liberty said they would take legal action against the Metropolitan Police following the arrests of two legal observers. Protests have continued since, with a London march on 1 May described as "the biggest 'kill the bill' protest yet".

Further demonstrations took place in cities including London, Bristol, Coventry, Newcastle, Liverpool, Manchester, Sheffield and Plymouth on Saturday 15 January 2022 ahead of a key vote on the proposed bill on Monday 17 January 2022.

== Passage ==
The bill's second reading was on 15–16 March 2021, by 359 votes to 263. As of 30 April, the bill had passed to the committee stage for consideration by the public bill committee. The committee was due to report back to the UK Parliament by 24 June. The Big Issue subsequently claimed that this date was delayed, partly due to pressure from protests. The third reading of the bill was agreed to by the House of Commons on 5 July 2021 by 365 votes to 265, a majority of 100. On 15 December 2021, the House of Lords continued the report stage after accepting a number of amendments.

On 17 January 2022, the Bill came up for debate in the House of Lords amid widespread protests. The Lords subsequently rejected many of the bill's key provisions, with one peer branding the restrictions on protests "repressive" and "nasty". The bill then went back to the Commons to be discussed and amended.

In February 2022, the Commons again voted in favour of the bill, although several MPs expressed concerns over the restrictions on protests. On 22 March, the House of Lords once again rejected the proposed legislation and demanded that the restrictions on protests be removed, sending the bill back to the House of Commons.

On 26 April 2022, the House of Lords passed the bill by 180 votes to 133. On 28 April 2022, the act received royal assent.

== Impact ==
On 28 June 2022, the day the act came into force, anti-Brexit activist Steve Bray had his amplification equipment seized by police under the Police Reform and Social Responsibility Act 2011. The Police, Crime, Sentencing and Courts Act 2022 extended the area around the House of Commons in which protest is restricted under the 2011 act.

== See also ==
- Nationality and Borders Act 2022
- Public Order Act 2023
- Censorship in the United Kingdom
- Human rights in the United Kingdom
