= Safeguarding Vulnerable Groups Act 2006 =

Act of the Parliament of the United Kingdom

Safeguarding Vulnerable Groups Act 2006 (Note: Section 67.)
- Act of Parliament
- Parliament of the United Kingdom
- Long title: An Act to make provision in connection with the protection of children and vulnerable adults.
- Citation: 2006 c. 47
- Territorial extent: England and Wales; Scotland (in part); Northern Ireland (in part); (Note: Section 66.)

Dates
- Royal assent: 8 November 2006
- Commencement: 8 November 2006 (sections 55 and 65); Various (rest of act); (Note: Section 65.)
Other legislation
Amends	Police Pensions Act 1976; Children Act 1989; Police Act 1996; Police Act 1997; Data Protection Act 1998; Teaching and Higher Education Act 1998; Protection of Children Act 1999; Care Standards Act 2000; Criminal Justice and Court Services Act 2000; Education Act 2002; Adoption and Children Act 2002; Health and Social Care (Community Health and Standards) Act 2003; Criminal Justice Act 2003; Children Act 2004; Civil Partnership Act 2004; Constitutional Reform Act 2005; Inquiries Act 2005; Serious Organised Crime and Police Act 2005; Childcare Act 2006
Amended by	Health and Social Care Act 2008; Education and Skills Act 2008; Transfer of Tribunal Functions Order 2008; Safeguarding Vulnerable Groups Act 2006 (Prescribed Criteria) (Foreign Offences) Order 2008; Health Act 2009; Policing and Crime Act 2009; Safeguarding Vulnerable Groups Act 2006 (Miscellaneous Provisions) Order 2009; Safeguarding Vulnerable Groups Act 2006 (Regulated Activity, Miscellaneous and Transitional Provisions and Commencement No. 5) Order 2009; Children and Families (Wales) Measure 2010; Pharmacy Order 2010; Safeguarding Vulnerable Groups Act 2006 (Supervisory Authorities and Devolution Alignment) Order 2010; Safeguarding Vulnerable Groups Act 2006 (Regulated Activity, Devolution and Miscellaneous Provisions) Order 2010; Education Act 2011; Charities Act 2011; Health and Social Care Act 2012; Protection of Freedoms Act 2012; Protection of Freedoms Act 2012 (Disclosure and Barring Service Transfer of Functions) Order 2012; Alternative Provision Academies (Consequential Amendments to Acts) (England) Order 2012; Tribunals, Courts and Enforcement Act 2007 (Consequential Amendments) Order 2012; Police and Fire Reform (Scotland) Act 2012 (Consequential Provisions and Modifications) Order 2013; Care Act 2014 and Children and Families Act 2014 (Consequential Amendments) Order 2015; Regulation and Inspection of Social Care (Wales) Act 2016; Social Services and Well-being (Wales) Act 2014 (Consequential Amendments) Regulations 2016; Children and Social Work Act 2017; Regulation and Inspection of Social Care (Wales) Act 2016 (Consequential Amendments) Regulations 2019; Sentencing Act 2020; Health and Care Act 2022; Tertiary Education and Research (Wales) Act 2022; Criminal Justice Act 2003 (Commencement No. 33) and Sentencing Act 2020 (Commencement No. 2) Regulations 2022; Curriculum and Assessment (Wales) Act 2021 (Consequential Amendments) (Primary Legislation) Regulations 2022; Judicial Review and Courts Act 2022 (Magistrates’ Court Sentencing Powers) Regulations 2023; Anaesthesia Associates and Physician Associates Order 2024; Health and Social Care (Wales) Act 2025

Status: Amended

History of passage through Parliament

Text of statute as originally enacted

Revised text of statute as amended

The Safeguarding Vulnerable Groups Act 2006 (c. 47) is an act of the Parliament of the United Kingdom. It was created following the UK Government accepting recommendation 19 of the inquiry headed by Sir Michael Bichard, which was set up in the wake of the Soham Murders.

The act established the legal basis for the Independent Safeguarding Authority who managed the two lists of people barred from working with children and/or vulnerable adults replacing the former barred lists (List 99, the Protection of Children Act 1999 (PoCA), the scheme relating to the Protection of Vulnerable Adults (PoVA) and Disqualification Orders). The Act also places a statutory duty on all those working with vulnerable groups to register and undergo an advanced vetting process with criminal sanctions for non-compliance.

While the act prohibited people on the barred list from working in residential care for vulnerable adults, it did allow such individuals to be considered to work for support roles in day centres.

The act allowed parents to check online whether an individual (such as a nanny, tutor or any other private instructor or domestic employee) has been banned from working with children.

== Section 65 - Commencement ==
The following orders were made under this section:

- The Safeguarding Vulnerable Groups Act 2006 (Commencement No. 1) Order 2007 (SI 2007/3545 (C.153))
- The Safeguarding Vulnerable Groups Act 2006 (Commencement No. 2) Order 2008 (SI 2008/1320 (C.57))
- The Safeguarding Vulnerable Groups Act 2006 (Commencement No. 3) Order 2009 (SI 2009/39 (C.3))
- The Safeguarding Vulnerable Groups Act 2006 (Commencement No. 4) Order 2009 (SI 2009/1503 (C.76))
- The Safeguarding Vulnerable Groups Act 2006 (Regulated Activity, Miscellaneous and Transitional Provisions and Commencement No. 5) Order 2009 (SI 2009/2610 (C.114))
- The Safeguarding Vulnerable Groups Act 2006 (Commencement No. 6, Transitional Provisions and Savings) Order 2009 (SI 2009/2611 (C.115))
- The Safeguarding Vulnerable Groups Act 2006 (Commencement No. 6, Transitional Provisions and Savings (Amendment)) and (Commencement No. 7) Order 2010 ([[[SI 2010]]/1101 (C.72))
- The Safeguarding Vulnerable Groups Act 2006 (Commencement No. 1) (England) Order 2008 (SI 2008/3204 (C.145))
- The Safeguarding Vulnerable Groups Act 2006 (Commencement No. 1) (Northern Ireland) Order 2008 (SI 2008/930 (C.45))
