= Assaults on Emergency Workers (Offences) Act 2018 =

United Kingdom law

Assaults on Emergency Workers (Offences) Act 2018 (Note: Section 4(3).)
- Act of Parliament
- Parliament of the United Kingdom
- Long title: An Act to make provision about offences when perpetrated against emergency workers, and persons assisting such workers; to make certain offences aggravated when perpetrated against such workers in the exercise of their duty; and for connected purposes.
- Citation: 2018 c. 23
- Introduced by: Chris Bryant (Commons); Baroness Donaghy (Lords)
- Territorial extent: England and Wales (Note: Section 4(1).)

Dates
- Royal assent: 13 September 2018
- Commencement: 13 November 2018 (Note: Section 4(2).)
Other legislation
Amends	Criminal Justice Act 1988
Amended by	Sentencing Act 2020; Criminal Justice Act 2003 (Commencement No. 33) and Sentencing Act 2020 (Commencement No. 2) Regulations 2022; Police, Crime, Sentencing and Courts Act 2022; Judicial Review and Courts Act 2022 (Magistrates’ Court Sentencing Powers) Regulations 2023

Status: Amended

History of passage through Parliament

Text of statute as originally enacted

Revised text of statute as amended

The Assaults on Emergency Workers (Offences) Act 2018 (c. 23) is an act of the Parliament of the United Kingdom. The act addresses policy issues related to attacks on emergency workers, especially government-employed officers, and defines specific offences on such workers. It was introduced to Parliament as a private member's bill by Chris Bryant. The act received royal assent on 13 November 2018.

== Provisions ==
The provisions of the act include:

- Making it a specific crime to commit common assault or battery against an emergency worker "acting in the exercise of functions as such a worker", punishable with up to 12 months in prison (double the previous maximum sentence), a fine or both. In the Act, the term 'emergency worker' has the definition:
  - (a) a constable;
  - (b) a person (other than a constable) who has the powers of a constable or is otherwise employed for police purposes or is engaged to provide services for police purposes;
  - (c) a National Crime Agency officer;
  - (d) a prison officer;
  - (e) a person (other than a prison officer) employed or engaged to carry out functions in a custodial institution of a corresponding kind to those carried out by a prison officer;
  - (f) a prisoner custody officer, so far as relating to the exercise of escort functions;
  - (g) a custody officer, so far as relating to the exercise of escort functions;
  - (h) a person employed for the purposes of providing, or engaged to provide, fire services or fire and rescue services;
  - (i) a person employed for the purposes of providing, or engaged to provide, search services or rescue services (or both);
  - (j) a person employed for the purposes of providing, or engaged to provide—
    - (I) NHS health services, or
    - (II) services in the support of the provision of NHS health services,
- The addition of subsections to section 39 (common assault and battery to be summary offences) of the Criminal Justice Act 1988. Section 39 was renumbered as 39(1); 39(2) was added in reference to the new Act.

== Timetable ==
The bill had its first reading in the House of Commons on 19 July 2017. It completed its passage through the Commons during April 2018 before moving to the House of Lords. As no amendments were tabled and no Lords requested a committee stage, Baroness Donaghy moved that the order of commitment be discharged. The motion passed on a voice vote and the Bill was sent straight to its third reading. Royal assent was granted on 13 September 2018.

== Reaction ==
The Act was widely applauded, with Norfolk Chief Constable Simon Bailey welcoming the change saying that "the figures [of assaults on officers] are really worrying".

However, on 14 September 2018, Hodge Jones & Allen solicitors published a piece titled "Assaults on Emergency Workers (Offences) Act 2018 – Not Quite the Legislation it Seems". The article highlighted that although the Act would double the prison sentence for those assaulting emergency workers, that Section 1(4) ensured this would only be enabled by the enactment of Section 154 (General limit on magistrates' court's power to impose imprisonment) of the Criminal Justice Act 2003. Section 154 has not been enacted. On 2 May 2022, Paragraph 24 of Schedule 22 to the Sentencing Act 2020 came into force, amending the same Act to increase the sentencing powers of magistrates' courts in the case of either way offences to 12 months; but this was in force for less than a year, as it was reversed on 3 March 2023 by regulations under powers introduced by the Judicial Review and Courts Act 2022. Only between these dates was it was possible for an assault on an emergency worker to be sentenced to more than six months if the case was tried in the magistrates' court.

Further protections for emergency workers are introduced by the Crime and Policing Act 2026.
