= Malicious Communications Act 1988 =

Act of the Parliament of the United Kingdom

Malicious Communications Act 1988 (Note: Section 3(1).)
- Act of Parliament
- Parliament of the United Kingdom
- Long title: An Act to make provision for the punishment of persons who send or deliver letters or other articles that are indecent or grossly offensive.
- Citation: 1988 c. 37
- Territorial extent: England and Wales; Northern Ireland (section 2 only); (Note: Section 3(3).)

Dates
- Royal assent: 29 July 1988
- Commencement: 29 July 1988 (sections 2–3); 29 September 1988 (section 1); (Note: Section 3(2).)
Other legislation
Amended by	Criminal Justice and Police Act 2001; Communications Act 2003; Criminal Justice and Courts Act 2015; Sentencing Act 2020; Criminal Justice Act 2003 (Commencement No. 33) and Sentencing Act 2020 (Commencement No. 2) Regulations 2022; Online Safety Act 2023
Relates to	Northern Ireland Act 1974

Status: Amended

Text of statute as originally enacted

Revised text of statute as amended

Text of the Malicious Communications Act 1988 as in force today (including any amendments) within the United Kingdom, from legislation.gov.uk.

The Malicious Communications Act 1988 (c. 37), also known as the MCA, is an act of the Parliament of the United Kingdom that makes it illegal in England and Wales to "send or deliver letters or other articles that are indecent or grossly offensive". It also applies to electronic communications.

== Scope of application ==
The original purpose of the MCA was to prevent the sending of printed matter, but the scope of the act has been extended to cover electronic communications. The MCA can be used to charge people for comments made via social networking sites that are “racially motivated” or "religiously motivated."

== Criticisms ==
The MCA has been criticised for its aim as a means to censor free speech, a core civil liberty. In 2012 someone was falsely arrested under the act for saying that Olympic diver Tom Daley let his dead father down by not winning a medal at the London Olympics.

On 17 July 2025, the House of Lords held a debate regarding these criticisms, for which the House of Lords Library prepared a briefing outlining a number of criticisms and providing some statistical information on the number of arrests and an analysis of Ministry of Justice data on the number of convictions and sentencings for the relevant offences.

== Highlighted cases ==
The MCA was used in 2011 against Internet troll Sean Duffy, who posted comments mocking the deaths of multiple teenagers. Duffy was sentenced to 18 weeks in prison and prohibited from registering on any social media site for five years. In the case of DPP v Connolly, the MCA was used to prosecute an anti-abortion campaigner who sent obscene images of foetuses to pharmacists who sold the contraceptive pill.

== See also ==
- Censorship in the United Kingdom
- Hate mail
- Communications Act 2003
