= Contempt of Court Act 1981 =

Act of the Parliament of the United Kingdom

Contempt of Court Act 1981 (Note: Section 21(1).)
- Act of Parliament
- Parliament of the United Kingdom
- Long title: An Act to amend the law relating to contempt of court and related matters.
- Citation: 1981 c. 49
- Territorial extent: England and Wales; Scotland; Northern Ireland (in part); (Note: Section 21(5).)

Dates
- Royal assent: 27 July 1981
- Commencement: various (Note: Section 21(2)–(4).)
Other legislation
Amends	Attachment of Earnings Act 1971; Employment Act 1980
Amended by	Senior Courts Act 1981; County Courts Act 1984Legal Aid (Scotland) Act 1986; Legal Aid Act 1988; Criminal Justice Act 1993; Defamation Act 1996; Statute Law (Repeals) Act 2004; Criminal Justice and Courts Act 2015; Sentencing Act 2020

Status: Amended

Text of statute as originally enacted

Text of the Contempt of Court Act 1981 as in force today (including any amendments) within the United Kingdom, from legislation.gov.uk.

The Contempt of Court Act 1981 (c. 49) is an act of the Parliament of the United Kingdom. It codifies some aspects of the common law offence of contempt of court.

Section 8 of the act provides that it is an offence for a person to ask for or make public any opinions or arguments put forward by a jury member in the course of making a decision. In Northern Ireland, the consent of the Attorney General is required to prosecute this offence. This section now extends only to Scotland and Northern Ireland; it was replaced in England and Wales by section 20D of the Juries Act 1974, as amended by the Criminal Justice and Courts Act 2015.
