= Sentencing Act 2020 =

Act of the Parliament of the United Kingdom

Sentencing Act 2020 (Note: Section 420.)
- Act of Parliament
- Parliament of the United Kingdom
- Long title: An Act to consolidate certain enactments relating to sentencing.
- Citation: 2020 c. 17
- Introduced by: Robert Buckland, Lord Chancellor and Secretary of State for Justice (Commons); The Lord Keen of Elie, Advocate General for Scotland (Lords)
- Territorial extent: England and Wales; Scotland (in part); Northern Ireland (in part); (Note: Section 414.)

Dates
- Royal assent: 22 October 2020
- Commencement: Various (Note: Section 416.)
Other legislation
Amends	List: Children and Young Persons Act 1933; Prison Act 1952; Prevention of Crime Act 1953; Copyright Act 1956; Nuclear Installations Act 1965; Criminal Appeal Act 1968; Courts-Martial (Appeals) Act 1968; Firearms Act 1968; Health Services and Public Health Act 1968; Civil Evidence Act 1968; Social Work (Scotland) Act 1968; Law Reform (Miscellaneous Provisions) (Scotland) Act 1968; Children and Young Persons Act 1969; Administration of Justice Act 1970; Misuse of Drugs Act 1971; Juries Act 1974; Health and Safety at Work etc. Act 1974; Consumer Credit Act 1974; Solicitors Act 1974; Rehabilitation of Offenders Act 1974; Bail Act 1976; Criminal Law Act 1977; Interpretation Act 1978; Rehabilitation of Offenders (Northern Ireland) Order 1978; Alcoholic Liquor Duties Act 1979; Hydrocarbon Oil Duties Act 1979; Ancient Monuments and Archaeological Areas Act 1979; Licensed Premises (Exclusion of Certain Persons) Act 1980; Magistrates' Courts Act 1980; Law Reform (Miscellaneous Provisions) (Scotland) Act 1980; Imprisonment (Temporary Provisions) Act 1980; Public Passenger Vehicles Act 1981; Criminal Attempts Act 1981; Contempt of Court Act 1981; Senior Courts Act 1981; Criminal Justice Act 1982; Mental Health Act 1983; Child Abduction Act 1984; Police and Criminal Evidence Act 1984; Prosecution of Offences Act 1985; Housing Act 1985; Surrey Act 1985; Clwyd County Council Act 1985; Insolvency Act 1986; Public Order Act 1986; Costs in Criminal Cases (General) Regulations 1986; Malicious Communications Act 1988; Criminal Justice Act 1988; Local Government Finance Act 1988; Firearms (Amendment) Act 1988; Copyright, Designs and Patents Act 1988; Housing Act 1988; Road Traffic Act 1988; Road Traffic Offenders Act 1988; Football Spectators Act 1989; Children Act 1989; Environmental Protection Act 1990; Town and Country Planning Act 1990; Criminal Justice Act 1991; Children (Secure Accommodation) Regulations 1991; Social Security Administration Act 1992; Local Government Finance Act 1992; Aggravated Vehicle-Taking Act 1992; Prisoners and Criminal Proceedings (Scotland) Act 1993; Vehicle Excise and Registration Act 1994; Criminal Justice and Public Order Act 1994; Prisoners (Return to Custody) Act 1995; Goods Vehicles (Licensing of Operators) Act 1995; Environment Act 1995; Criminal Procedure (Scotland) Act 1995; London Local Authorities Act 1995; Criminal Procedure and Investigations Act 1996; Housing Act 1996; Education Act 1996; Jobseeker's Allowance Regulations 1996; Social Security (Recovery of Benefits) Act 1997; Protection from Harassment Act 1997; Crime (Sentences) Act 1997; Police Act 1997; Police (Property) Regulations 1997; Merchant Shipping (Oil Pollution) (South Georgia and the South Sandwich Islands) Order 1997; Crime and Disorder Act 1998; Youth Justice and Criminal Evidence Act 1999; Prison Rules 1999; Powers of Criminal Courts (Sentencing) Act 2000; Financial Services and Markets Act 2000; Terrorism Act 2000; Criminal Justice and Court Services Act 2000; Youth Justice Board for England and Wales Order 2000; Magistrates' Courts Warrants (Specification of Provisions) Order 2000; Young Offender Institution Rules 2000; Social Security Fraud Act 2001; Private Security Industry Act 2001; Criminal Justice and Police Act 2001; International Criminal Court Act 2001; Anti-terrorism, Crime and Security Act 2001; Representation of the People (England and Wales) Regulations 2001; Representation of the People (Scotland) Regulations 2001; Tax Credits Act 2002; Proceeds of Crime Act 2002; Child Tax Credit Regulations 2002; Homelessness (Priority Need for Accommodation) (England) Order 2002; Railways and Transport Safety Act 2003; Crime (International Co-operation) Act 2003; Courts Act 2003; Extradition Act 2003; Sexual Offences Act 2003; Criminal Justice Act 2003; Health and Social Care (Community Health and Standards) Act 2003; Proceeds of Crime Act 2002 (Exemptions from Civil Recovery) Order 2003; Guardian's Allowance (General) Regulations 2003; Gangmasters (Licensing) Act 2004; Asylum and Immigration (Treatment of Claimants, etc.) Act 2004; Energy Act 2004; Fire and Rescue Services Act 2004; Companies (Audit, Investigations and Community Enterprise) Act 2004; Domestic Violence, Crime and Victims Act 2004; Human Tissue Act 2004; Children Act 2004; Housing Act 2004; Magistrates' Courts (Parenting Orders) Rules 2004; Constitutional Reform Act 2005; Serious Organised Crime and Police Act 2005; Clean Neighbourhoods and Environment Act 2005; Education Act 2005; Criminal Justice Act 2003 (Commencement No. 8 and Transitional and Saving Provisions) Order 2005; Proceeds of Crime Act 2002 (External Requests and Orders) Order 2005; National Health Service (General Dental Services Contracts) Regulations 2005; National Health Service (Personal Dental Services Agreements) Regulations 2005; National Health Service (Dental Charges) Regulations 2005; Terrorism Act 2006; Immigration, Asylum and Nationality Act 2006; Children and Adoption Act 2006; Childcare Act 2006; Health Act 2006; Government of Wales Act 2006; Fraud Act 2006; Wireless Telegraphy Act 2006; Violent Crime Reduction Act 2006; National Health Service Act 2006; National Health Service (Wales) Act 2006; Companies Act 2006; Safeguarding Vulnerable Groups Act 2006; Police and Justice Act 2006; Road Safety Act 2006; Charities Act 2006; Legislative and Regulatory Reform Act 2006; Armed Forces Act 2006; Recovery of Health Services Charges (Northern Ireland) Order 2006; Child Benefit (General) Regulations 2006; National Health Service (Personal Dental Services Agreements) (Wales) Regulations 2006; National Health Service (General Dental Services Contracts) (Wales) Regulations 2006; National Health Service (Dental Charges) (Wales) Regulations 2006; Criminal Justice Act 1988 (Reviews of Sentencing) Order 2006; Serious Organised Crime and Police Act 2005 (Appeals under Section 74) Order 2006; Digital Switchover (Disclosure of Information) Act 2007; Tribunals, Courts and Enforcement Act 2007; Statistics and Registration Service Act 2007; Offender Management Act 2007; Serious Crime Act 2007; Legal Services Act 2007; London Local Authorities Act 2007; National Health Service (Free Prescriptions and Charges for Drugs and Appliances) (Wales) Regulations 2007; Criminal Defence Service (Funding) Order 2007; Community Order (Review by Specified Courts) Order 2007; Electronic Commerce Directive (Terrorism Act 2006) Regulations 2007; Criminal Justice and Immigration Act 2008; Regulatory Enforcement and Sanctions Act 2008; Health and Social Care Act 2008; Education and Skills Act 2008; Climate Change Act 2008; Counter-Terrorism Act 2008; Learner Travel (Wales) Measure 2008; Immigration (Disposal of Property) Regulations 2008; Employment and Support Allowance Regulations 2008; Primary Ophthalmic Services Regulations 2008; Representation of the People (Northern Ireland) Regulations 2008; Local Authorities (Conduct of Referendums) (Wales) Regulations 2008; Export Control Order 2008; Political Parties and Elections Act 2009; Parliamentary Standards Act 2009; Coroners and Justice Act 2009; Zimbabwe (Financial Sanctions) Regulations 2009; Iran (United Nations Sanctions) Order 2009; Armed Forces Act 2006 (Transitional Provisions etc) Order 2009; Armed Forces (Service Civilian Court) Rules 2009; Armed Forces (Financial Penalty Enforcement Orders) Regulations 2009; Carriage of Dangerous Goods and Use of Transportable Pressure Equipment Regulations 2009; North Korea (United Nations Sanctions) Order 2009; Community Care, Services for Carers and Children's Services (Direct Payments) (England) Regulations 2009; Police and Criminal Evidence Act 1984 (Armed Forces) Order 2009; Armed Forces (Court Martial) Rules 2009; Armed Forces (Civilian Courts Dealing with Service Offences) (Modification of the Criminal Justice Act 2003) Regulations 2009; Criminal Justice and Immigration Act 2008 (Commencement No.13 and Transitory Provision) Order 2009; Bribery Act 2010; Terrorist Asset-Freezing etc. Act 2010; Identity Documents Act 2010; Environmental Civil Sanctions (England) Order 2010; Environmental Civil Sanctions (Wales) Order 2010; Child Minding and Day Care (Disqualification) (Wales) Regulations 2010; Visits to Former Looked After Children in Detention (England) Regulations 2010; National Assembly for Wales Referendum (Assembly Act Provisions) (Referendum Question, Date of Referendum Etc.) Order 2010; Disabled People's Right to Control (Pilot Scheme) (England) Regulations 2010; Somalia (Asset-Freezing) Regulations 2010; Finance Act 2011; Localism Act 2011; Terrorism Prevention and Investigation Measures Act 2011; Public Bodies Act 2011; Charities Act 2011; Export Control (Somalia) Order 2011; Egypt (Asset-Freezing) Regulations 2011; Tunisia (Asset-Freezing) Regulations 2011; Iran (Asset-Freezing) Regulations 2011; Disclosure of State Pension Credit Information (Warm Home Discount) Regulations 2011; Afghanistan (Asset-Freezing) Regulations 2011; Export Control (Belarus) and (Syria Amendment) Order 2011; ISIL (Da'esh) and Al-Qaida (Asset-Freezing) Regulations 2011; Welfare Reform Act 2012; Legal Aid, Sentencing and Punishment of Offenders Act 2012; Finance Act 2012; Financial Services Act 2012; Syria (European Union Financial Sanctions) Regulations 2012; Local Authorities (Conduct of Referendums) (England) Regulations 2012; Local Authorities (Conduct of Referendums) (Council Tax Increases) (England) Regulations 2012; Guinea-Bissau (Asset-Freezing) Regulations 2012; Iraq (Asset-Freezing) Regulations 2012; Republic of Guinea (Asset-Freezing) Regulations 2012; Democratic Republic of the Congo (Asset-Freezing) Regulations 2012; Eritrea (Asset-Freezing) Regulations 2012; Lebanon and Syria (Asset-Freezing) Regulations 2012; Criminal Justice Act 2003 (Surcharge) Order 2012; Neighbourhood Planning (Referendums) Regulations 2012; Child Support Maintenance Calculation Regulations 2012; National Health Service Commissioning Board and Clinical Commissioning Groups (Responsibilities and Standing Rules) Regulations 2012; Prevention of Social Housing Fraud Act 2013; Electoral Registration and Administration Act 2013; Crime and Courts Act 2013; Enterprise and Regulatory Reform Act 2013; Energy Act 2013; Financial Services (Banking Reform) Act 2013; Mobile Homes (Wales) Act 2013; Criminal Legal Aid (General) Regulations 2013; Belarus (Asset-Freezing) Regulations 2013; National Health Service (Clinical Commissioning Groups—Disapplication of Responsibility) Regulations 2013; Employment and Support Allowance Regulations 2013; Criminal Legal Aid (Remuneration) Regulations 2013; National Health Service (Optical Charges and Payments) Regulations 2013; National Health Service (Direct Payments) Regulations 2013; Export Control (Syria Sanctions) Order 2013; Mesothelioma Act 2014; Anti-social Behaviour, Crime and Policing Act 2014; Defence Reform Act 2014; Water Act 2014; Immigration Act 2014; Finance Act 2014; Social Services and Well-being (Wales) Act 2014; Housing (Wales) Act 2014; Ukraine (European Union Financial Sanctions) Regulations 2014; Central African Republic (European Union Financial Sanctions) Regulations 2014; Ukraine (European Union Financial Sanctions) (No. 2) Regulations 2014; Criminal Justice (Electronic Monitoring) (Responsible Person) (No. 2) Order 2014; Offender Management Act 2007 (Approved Premises) Regulations 2014; Special Educational Needs (Personal Budgets) Regulations 2014; Sudan (European Union Financial Sanctions) Regulations 2014; Independent Educational Provision in England (Prohibition on Participation in Management) Regulations 2014; Ukraine (European Union Financial Sanctions) (No. 3) Regulations 2014; Export Control (Russia, Crimea and Sevastopol Sanctions) Order 2014; Care and Support (Direct Payments) Regulations 2014; Criminal Justice (European Protection Order) (England and Wales) Regulations 2014; Yemen (European Union Financial Sanctions) Regulations 2014; Criminal Justice and Courts Act 2015; Counter-Terrorism and Security Act 2015; Serious Crime Act 2015; Recall of MPs Act 2015; Modern Slavery Act 2015; Human Trafficking and Exploitation (Scotland) Act 2015; Human Trafficking and Exploitation (Criminal Justice and Support for Victims) Act (Northern Ireland) 2015; State Pension Regulations 2015; National Health Service (Charges for Drugs and Appliances) Regulations 2015; Prosecution of Offences Act 1985 (Criminal Courts Charge) Regulations 2015; Electricity and Gas (Market Integrity and Transparency) (Criminal Sanctions) Regulations 2015; Homelessness (Intentionality) (Specified Categories) (Wales) Regulations 2015; South Sudan (European Union Financial Sanctions) (No. 2) Regulations 2015; Children (Secure Accommodation) (Wales) Regulations 2015; Export Control (Democratic Republic of Congo Sanctions and Miscellaneous Amendments and Revocations) Order 2015; Burundi (European Union Financial Sanctions) Regulations 2015; Care and Support (Direct Payments) (Wales) Regulations 2015; Payment Card Interchange Fee Regulations 2015; Psychoactive Substances Act 2016; Immigration Act 2016; Investigatory Powers Act 2016; Regulation and Inspection of Social Care (Wales) Act 2016; Abusive Behaviour and Sexual Harm (Scotland) Act 2016; Iran (European Union Financial Sanctions) Regulations 2016; Libya (European Union Financial Sanctions) Regulations 2016; Export Control (Iran Sanctions) Order 2016; Export Control (Libya Sanctions) Order 2016; Environmental Permitting (England and Wales) Regulations 2016; Childcare (Early Years Provision Free of Charge) (Extended Entitlement) Regulations 2016; Criminal Justice (Electronic Monitoring) (Responsible Person) (No. 2) Order 2016; Policing and Crime Act 2017; Democratic People's Republic of Korea (European Union Financial Sanctions) Regulations 2017; Bereavement Support Payment Regulations 2017; Payment Services Regulations 2017; Republic of Mali (European Union Financial Sanctions) Regulations 2017; Criminal Justice (Electronic Monitoring) (Responsible Person) Order 2017; Venezuela (European Union Financial Sanctions) Regulations 2017; Environmental Protection (Microbeads) (England) Regulations 2017; Finance Act 2017; Digital Economy Act 2017; Finance (No. 2) Act 2017; Space Industry Act 2018; Laser Misuse (Vehicles) Act 2018; Data Protection Act 2018; Sanctions and Anti-Money Laundering Act 2018; Assaults on Emergency Workers (Offences) Act 2018; Ivory Act 2018; Export Control (Venezuela Sanctions) Order 2018; Export Control (North Korea Sanctions) Order 2018; Nuclear Security (Secretary of State Security Directions) Regulations 2018; Burma (European Union Financial Sanctions) Regulations 2018; Criminal Justice Act 2003 (Alcohol Abstinence and Monitoring Requirement) (Prescription of Arrangement for Monitoring) Order 2018; Environmental Protection (Microbeads) (Wales) Regulations 2018; Childcare (Disqualification) and Childcare (Early Years Provision Free of Charge) (Extended Entitlement) (Amendment) Regulations 2018; Republic of Maldives (Asset-Freezing) Regulations 2018; Social Workers Regulations 2018; Export Control (Burma Sanctions) (No. 2) Order 2018; Chemical Weapons (Asset-Freezing) and Miscellaneous Amendments Regulations 2018; Counter-Terrorism and Border Security Act 2019; Stalking Protection Act 2019; Offensive Weapons Act 2019; Management of Offenders (Scotland) Act 2019; Iran (Sanctions) (Human Rights) (EU Exit) Regulations 2019; Venezuela (Sanctions) (EU Exit) Regulations 2019; Burma (Sanctions) (EU Exit) Regulations 2019; Democratic People's Republic of Korea (Sanctions) (EU Exit) Regulations 2019; Democratic Republic of the Congo (Sanctions) (EU Exit) Regulations 2019; South Sudan (Sanctions) (EU Exit) Regulations 2019; Iran (Sanctions) (Nuclear) (EU Exit) Regulations 2019; ISIL (Da'esh) and Al-Qaida (United Nations Sanctions) (EU Exit) Regulations 2019; Republic of Guinea-Bissau (Sanctions) (EU Exit) Regulations 2019; Counter-Terrorism (International Sanctions) (EU Exit) Regulations 2019; Counter-Terrorism (Sanctions) (EU Exit) Regulations 2019; Republic of Belarus (Sanctions) (EU Exit) Regulations 2019; Zimbabwe (Sanctions) (EU Exit) Regulations 2019; Chemical Weapons (Sanctions) (EU Exit) Regulations 2019; Syria (Sanctions) (EU Exit) Regulations 2019; Russia (Sanctions) (EU Exit) Regulations 2019; Cyber-Attacks (Asset-Freezing) Regulations 2019; Burundi (Sanctions) (EU Exit) Regulations 2019; Guinea (Sanctions) (EU Exit) Regulations 2019; Nicaragua (Asset-Freezing) Regulations 2019; Turkey (Asset-Freezing) Regulations 2019; Coronavirus Act 2020; Andrey Lugovoy and Dmitri Kovtun Freezing Order 2020; Release of Prisoners (Alteration of Relevant Proportion of Sentence) Order 2020; Cyber (Sanctions) (EU Exit) Regulations 2020; Bosnia and Herzegovina (Sanctions) (EU Exit) Regulations 2020; Nicaragua (Sanctions) (EU Exit) Regulations 2020; Lebanon (Sanctions) (EU Exit) Regulations 2020; Central African Republic (Sanctions) (EU Exit) Regulations 2020; Lebanon (Sanctions) (Assassination of Rafiq Hariri and others) (EU Exit) Regulations 2020; Somalia (Sanctions) (EU Exit) Regulations 2020; Global Human Rights Sanctions Regulations 2020; See § Repealed enactments
Amended by	Counter-Terrorism and Sentencing Act 2021; Domestic Abuse Act 2021; Police, Crime, Sentencing and Courts Act 2022; Judicial Review and Courts Act 2022; Elections Act 2022; Public Order Act 2023; National Security Act 2023; Northern Ireland Troubles (Legacy and Reconciliation) Act 2023; Online Safety Act 2023; Data (Use and Access) Act 2025; Employment Rights Act 2025; Sentencing Act 2026; National Security (State Threats) Act 2026

Status: Amended

History of passage through Parliament

Text of statute as originally enacted

Revised text of statute as amended

The Sentencing Act 2020 is a landmark act of the Parliament of the United Kingdom. The act has 14 Parts and 29 Schedules. Parts 2 to 13 of the act together make up a code called the “Sentencing Code”. The Sentencing Code is the law which contains the main sentencing regime in England and Wales.

== Passage ==
The act was a Consolidation Bill as recommended by the Law Commission. It was introduced as a Bill in the House of Lords by Lord Keen of Elie, Advocate General for Scotland on 5 March 2020. The Bill was given a second reading in the Lords on 25 June 2020, had its order of commitment discharged on 25 July 2020, given a third reading and passed on 8 September 2020 by the Lords. The Bill was then introduced to the House of Commons by Robert Buckland, Lord Chancellor and Secretary of State for Justice on 9 September 2020. The Bill was given a second and third reading and passed on 30 September 2020. This was probably the only Bill of this size for a significant period of time to be passed by both Houses without any amendment being made. The Bill was supported and endorsed by many politicians, including most prominently Lord Judge, the former Lord Chief Justice, who commented about how it would improve the location of sentencing law in the United Kingdom for judges.

== Provisions ==
=== Sentencing Code ===
The Sentencing Code consolidates a plethora of legislation relating to sentencing and also sought to stamp out previous legislative ambiguities and inconsistencies. Many acts were consolidated into and repealed as a consequence of the Sentencing Code.

The Sentencing Code has been amended since the enactment of the Sentencing Act 2020 by different acts, including, in particular, the Counter-Terrorism and Sentencing Act 2021 and the Police, Crime, Sentencing and Courts Act 2022. Section 3 of the PCSC inserted 'Harpers Law'—which requires a life sentence for manslaughter of an emergency worker, absent extraordinary circumstances—into the Sentencing Code. The Sentencing Code is due to be further amended by the Victims and Prisoners Bill, the Criminal Justice Bill and the Sentencing Bill, the latter of which will make whole life orders mandatory for certain offences.

=== Purpose of sentencing ===
Section 57 of the act sets out five statutory purposes of sentencing:

- the punishment of offenders
- the reduction of crime
- the reform and rehabilitation of offenders
- the protection of the public
- the making of reparation by offenders to persons affected by their offences

=== Terrorism connection ===
Under section 69 of the act, a court sentencing an offender for certain offences must consider whether the offence had a "terrorism connection".

A terrorism connection may be found where the offence was, or took place in the course of, an act of terrorism, or was committed for the purposes of terrorism. The test therefore relies on the definition of terrorism in section 1 of the Terrorism Act 2000, including action involving serious violence, serious damage to property, serious risk to public safety, or serious interference with an electronic system, where the remaining statutory elements are satisfied.

The concept of a "terrorism connection" was first introduced in section 30 of the Counter-Terrorism Act 2008, and a number of cases subsequent to that act resulted a terrorism connection being applied as an aggravating factor in sentencing:

- 2017 Parsons Green train bombing
- 2020 Reading stabbings

A finding of terrorism connection is treated as a statutory aggravating factor and may also trigger terrorism-related ancillary consequences, including notification requirements.

The Counter-Terrorism and Sentencing Act 2021 expanded the sentencing regime by requiring courts to consider terrorist connection findings for a wider range of non-terrorism offences punishable by more than two years' imprisonment, unless expressly excluded.

Since the Sentencing Act 2020 were introduced, a "terrorism connection" has been applied on a number of occasions in cases of violent crimes where the perpetrators were motivated by ideological causes:

- 2021 Murder of David Amess
- 2023 St Mary's Hospital Leeds attack
- 2023 Hartlepool knife murder
- 2024 Neo-Nazi stabbing
- 2024 Russia-backed arson attack

Public scrutiny of Section 69 increased during 2026 following its application in sentencing three of the defendants in the Filton protest case, who had been convicted of one count of criminal damage.

Scrutiny further increased in July 2026 when the judge in a case involving five defendants accused of breaking windows and throwing red paint over a branch of Barclays Bank in Lancashire announced that he too would be considering a "terrorism connection" in sentencing. Human rights lawyers denounced the step as "unfair" given that none of the defendants had been prosecuted on the basis of their being a "terrorism connection", and the announcement was only made by the judge after a guilty verdict had been returned.

=== Harper's Law ===
Schedule 21 to the act sets out Harper's Law, which provides for a whole life order for murders a person belonging to certain categories.

=== Repealed enactments ===
Section 413(1) of the act repealed 51 enactments and revoked 18 instruments, listed in schedule 28 to the act.

Citation	Short title	Extent of repeal or revocation
1 & 2 Eliz. 2 c. 14	Prevention of Crime Act 1953	In section 1, subsections (2A) to (2G).
1 & 2 Eliz. 2 c. 14	Prevention of Crime Act 1953	Section 1ZA.
1 & 2 Eliz. 2 c. 14	Prevention of Crime Act 1953	In section 1A, subsections (5), (6), (7) and (9).
1968 c. 27	Firearms Act 1968	In section 51A—(a) subsection (4)(a), and (b) subsection (5)(a) (together with the final "and").
1980 c. 43	Magistrates' Courts Act 1980	Section 34.
1980 c. 43	Magistrates' Courts Act 1980	In section 143—(a) in subsection (2), paragraphs (ca), (cb), (d), (o) and (p), and (b) in subsection (3)(b), the words "or section 87 of the Legal Aid, Sentencing and Punishment of Offenders Act 2012".
1980 c. 43	Magistrates' Courts Act 1980	In Schedule 6A, the entry relating to Schedule 8 to the Powers of Criminal Courts (Sentencing) Act 2000.
1985 c. 23	Prosecution of Offences Act 1985	Sections 21A to 21F.
1988 c. 33	Criminal Justice Act 1988	In section 139, subsections (6A) to (6G).
1988 c. 33	Criminal Justice Act 1988	In section 139A, subsections (5A) to (5G).
1988 c. 33	Criminal Justice Act 1988	Section 139AZA.
1988 c. 33	Criminal Justice Act 1988	In section 139AA, subsections (7), (8), (9) and (11).
1988 c. 53	Road Traffic Offenders Act 1988	Section 25(4).
1991 c. 53	Criminal Justice Act 1991	In Schedule 11, paragraph 27(1).
1997 c. 40	Protection from Harassment Act 1997	Section 5.
1998 c. 37	Crime and Disorder Act 1998	In section 8—(a) in subsection (1), paragraphs (c) and (d); (b) in subsection (2), the words "or, as the case may be, the person convicted of the offence under section 443 or 444"; (c) in subsection (6), paragraphs (b) and (c); (d) in subsection (7), the words "or, as the case may be, the commission of any such further offence".
1998 c. 37	Crime and Disorder Act 1998	In section 9—(a) subsections (1) and (1A); (b) in subsection (2)—(i) in paragraph (b), the words "or (c)"; (ii) paragraph (c); (c) subsections (2A), (2B), (5A) and (7A).
1998 c. 37	Crime and Disorder Act 1998	In section 10, subsections (4) and (5).
1998 c. 37	Crime and Disorder Act 1998	In section 18(1), the definition of "serious harm".
2000 c. 6	Powers of Criminal Courts (Sentencing) Act 2000	The whole act, apart from—(a) section 11; (b) sections 33, 36B, 60 and 61; (c) section 108; (d) sections 139 and 140 (except so far as repealed by Schedule 24 to this Act); (e) section 142; (f) sections 163 to 168; (g) Schedule 5; (h) specified paragraphs of Schedule 9; (i) in Schedule 11, Part 1.
2000 c. 43	Criminal Justice and Court Services Act 2000	Section 60.
2000 c. 43	Criminal Justice and Court Services Act 2000	Section 61(7).
2000 c. 43	Criminal Justice and Court Services Act 2000	In Schedule 7—(a) paragraphs 176 to 178; (b) paragraphs 180 to 182; (c) paragraphs 184 to 187; (d) paragraphs 190 and 191; (e) paragraph 203(5).
2000 c. 43	Criminal Justice and Court Services Act 2000	In Schedule 8, the entry relating to sections 93 to 98 of the Powers of Criminal Courts (Sentencing) Act 2000.
2001 c. 16	Criminal Justice and Police Act 2001	Section 133.
2002 c. 29	Proceeds of Crime Act 2002	Section 88(5).
2002 c. 29	Proceeds of Crime Act 2002	In Schedule 11, paragraph 37.
2002 c. 30	Police Reform Act 2002	Section 56(6).
2003 c. 32	Crime (International Co-operation) Act 2003	In Schedule 5, paragraphs 72 to 74.
2003 c. 42	Sexual Offences Act 2003	Section 103A(2)(a)(i).
2003 c. 42	Sexual Offences Act 2003	Section 103H(1)(a).
2003 c. 42	Sexual Offences Act 2003	In Schedule 6, paragraph 43(2).
2003 c. 44	Criminal Justice Act 2003	Sections 142 to 154.
2003 c. 44	Criminal Justice Act 2003	Sections 156 to 166.
2003 c. 44	Criminal Justice Act 2003	Section 172.
2003 c. 44	Criminal Justice Act 2003	Section 174.
2003 c. 44	Criminal Justice Act 2003	Sections 176 and 177.
2003 c. 44	Criminal Justice Act 2003	Sections 178 to 180.
2003 c. 44	Criminal Justice Act 2003	Sections 189 to 220A.
2003 c. 44	Criminal Justice Act 2003	Sections 222 to 229.
2003 c. 44	Criminal Justice Act 2003	Sections 231 to 236A.
2003 c. 44	Criminal Justice Act 2003	Section 238.
2003 c. 44	Criminal Justice Act 2003	In section 240A, subsections (3) and (8).
2003 c. 44	Criminal Justice Act 2003	Section 265.
2003 c. 44	Criminal Justice Act 2003	Sections 269 and 270.
2003 c. 44	Criminal Justice Act 2003	Sections 277 and 278.
2003 c. 44	Criminal Justice Act 2003	Section 289.
2003 c. 44	Criminal Justice Act 2003	Section 291(1)(b).
2003 c. 44	Criminal Justice Act 2003	Section 298.
2003 c. 44	Criminal Justice Act 2003	In section 302, the words from "paragraph 7(2)" to "Schedule 12,".
2003 c. 44	Criminal Justice Act 2003	Section 305(4).
2003 c. 44	Criminal Justice Act 2003	Section 324.
2003 c. 44	Criminal Justice Act 2003	In section 330—(a) in subsection (5)(a), the entries relating to sections 178, 223, 236A(6) and 269(6); (b) in subsection (7), the entries relating to sections 202(3)(b) and 215(3).
2003 c. 44	Criminal Justice Act 2003	In section 337(2)—(a) the entries relating to sections 180 and 194 and Schedules 9 and 13; (b) the entry relating to paragraph 12(3) of Schedule 12.
2003 c. 44	Criminal Justice Act 2003	In Schedule 3—(a) paragraphs 21 to 28; (b) in paragraph 74, sub-paragraphs (2), (3), and (5).
2003 c. 44	Criminal Justice Act 2003	Schedule 8.
2003 c. 44	Criminal Justice Act 2003	Schedule 9.
2003 c. 44	Criminal Justice Act 2003	Schedule 12.
2003 c. 44	Criminal Justice Act 2003	Schedule 13.
2003 c. 44	Criminal Justice Act 2003	Schedule 14.
2003 c. 44	Criminal Justice Act 2003	Schedule 15B.
2003 c. 44	Criminal Justice Act 2003	Schedule 18A.
2003 c. 44	Criminal Justice Act 2003	Schedule 21.
2003 c. 44	Criminal Justice Act 2003	In Schedule 22, paragraphs 9 and 10.
2003 c. 44	Criminal Justice Act 2003	Schedule 23.
2003 c. 44	Criminal Justice Act 2003	In Schedule 32—(a) paragraphs 21(3), 24, 26, 33, 54, 64(6), 65 and 88; (b) paragraphs 90 to 94; (c) paragraph 106; (d) paragraphs 108 to 121; (e) in paragraph 123, sub-paragraphs (4), (6) and (7); (f) paragraphs 124 to 126; (g) paragraph 141.
2003 c. 44	Criminal Justice Act 2003	Schedule 34.
2003 c. 44	Criminal Justice Act 2003	In Schedule 36, paragraph 98.
2004 c. 28	Domestic Violence, Crime and Victims Act 2004	In section 12, subsections (2) to (4).
2004 c. 28	Domestic Violence, Crime and Victims Act 2004	In section 14, subsections (1) and (2).
2004 c. 28	Domestic Violence, Crime and Victims Act 2004	In Schedule 5, paragraphs 2, 7, 8 and 9.
2004 c. 28	Domestic Violence, Crime and Victims Act 2004	In Schedule 10, paragraphs 43, 49, 50, 51, 52, 63 and 64.
2004 c. 28	Domestic Violence, Crime and Victims Act 2004	In Schedule 12, paragraph 7.
2005 c. 15	Serious Organised Crime and Police Act 2005	In section 73—(a) subsections (5A), (6A) and (7); (b) in subsection (8)(b), the words "section 76 of the Powers of Criminal Courts (Sentencing) Act 2000 (c. 6) or"; (c) subsection (8A).
2005 c. 15	Serious Organised Crime and Police Act 2005	In section 74, subsections (9), (12)(a), (14) and (16).
2005 c. 15	Serious Organised Crime and Police Act 2005	Section 75(6).
2005 c. 15	Serious Organised Crime and Police Act 2005	Section 75A.
2005 c. 15	Serious Organised Crime and Police Act 2005	Section 125(6).
2006 c. 9	Criminal Defence Service Act 2006	In section 4, subsection (2)(c).
2006 c. 35	Fraud Act 2006	In Schedule 1, paragraph 29.
2006 c. 38	Violent Crime Reduction Act 2006	In section 29, subsections (4) to (6).
2006 c. 38	Violent Crime Reduction Act 2006	In Schedule 1, paragraph 7 and paragraph 9(3) and (8).
2006 c. 48	Police and Justice Act 2006	In Schedule 13, paragraph 32.
2006 c. 48	Police and Justice Act 2006	In Schedule 14, paragraph 62.
2006 c. 49	Road Safety Act 2006	In Schedule 3, paragraphs 71 to 73.
2006 c. 52	Armed Forces Act 2006	In Schedule 16—(a) paragraphs 163 to 166; (b) paragraphs 216 and 217; (c) paragraph 236.
2007 c. 15	Tribunals, Courts and Enforcement Act 2007	In Schedule 13, paragraphs 132, 133 and 154.
2007 c. 21	Offender Management Act 2007	Section 31.
2007 c. 21	Offender Management Act 2007	Section 33.
2007 c. 21	Offender Management Act 2007	Section 34.
2007 c. 21	Offender Management Act 2007	In Schedule 3, paragraph 9.
2007 c. 27	Serious Crime Act 2007	In Schedule 6, paragraph 39.
2007 c. 29	Legal Services Act 2007	In Schedule 21, paragraphs 147 and 148.
2007 c. 30	UK Borders Act 2007	Section 25(3)(a).
2008 c. 4	Criminal Justice and Immigration Act 2008	Sections 1 to 5.
2008 c. 4	Criminal Justice and Immigration Act 2008	Sections 7 and 8.
2008 c. 4	Criminal Justice and Immigration Act 2008	In section 9, subsections (1) and (2).
2008 c. 4	Criminal Justice and Immigration Act 2008	Sections 10 to 12.
2008 c. 4	Criminal Justice and Immigration Act 2008	Sections 17 to 20.
2008 c. 4	Criminal Justice and Immigration Act 2008	In section 22, subsections (5) and (6).
2008 c. 4	Criminal Justice and Immigration Act 2008	Sections 35 to 38.
2008 c. 4	Criminal Justice and Immigration Act 2008	In section 147—(a) subsection (4)(b); (b) in subsection (5), paragraphs (a), (i) and (j).
2008 c. 4	Criminal Justice and Immigration Act 2008	Schedule 1.
2008 c. 4	Criminal Justice and Immigration Act 2008	Schedule 2.
2008 c. 4	Criminal Justice and Immigration Act 2008	Schedule 3.
2008 c. 4	Criminal Justice and Immigration Act 2008	In Schedule 4—(a) paragraphs 51 to 58 and 60; (b) paragraphs 62 to 64; (c) paragraphs 72 to 91; (d) paragraphs 93, 96, 100 and 103; (e) paragraphs 106 to 109.
2008 c. 4	Criminal Justice and Immigration Act 2008	In Schedule 8, paragraph 28.
2008 c. 4	Criminal Justice and Immigration Act 2008	In Schedule 13, paragraphs 8 to 10.
2008 c. 4	Criminal Justice and Immigration Act 2008	In Schedule 26—(a) paragraphs 40 to 49; (b) paragraphs 64 to 70; (c) paragraph 72.
2008 c. 23	Children and Young Persons Act 2008	In Schedule 1, paragraph 21.
2008 c. 28	Counter-Terrorism Act 2008	Section 32.
2008 c. 28	Counter-Terrorism Act 2008	Section 75(2)(c).
2009 c. 25	Coroners and Justice Act 2009	Section 125.
2009 c. 25	Coroners and Justice Act 2009	Section 126.
2009 c. 25	Coroners and Justice Act 2009	In Schedule 16, paragraph 5.
2009 c. 25	Coroners and Justice Act 2009	In Schedule 17, paragraphs 6, 8, 10 and 12.
2009 c. 25	Coroners and Justice Act 2009	In Schedule 21, paragraphs 52, 85, 86, 94, 95 and 98.
2009 c. 26	Policing and Crime Act 2009	In Schedule 7, paragraph 22.
2012 c. 7	Health and Social Care Act 2012	Section 38(5)(d).
2012 c. 10	Legal Aid, Sentencing and Punishment of Offenders Act 2012	In section 64, subsections (1) to (3).
2012 c. 10	Legal Aid, Sentencing and Punishment of Offenders Act 2012	In section 65, subsections (1) to (9).
2012 c. 10	Legal Aid, Sentencing and Punishment of Offenders Act 2012	Sections 66 and 67.
2012 c. 10	Legal Aid, Sentencing and Punishment of Offenders Act 2012	In section 68, subsections (1) to (5).
2012 c. 10	Legal Aid, Sentencing and Punishment of Offenders Act 2012	Sections 69 to 74.
2012 c. 10	Legal Aid, Sentencing and Punishment of Offenders Act 2012	Section 76.
2012 c. 10	Legal Aid, Sentencing and Punishment of Offenders Act 2012	Section 77.
2012 c. 10	Legal Aid, Sentencing and Punishment of Offenders Act 2012	In section 79, subsections (1) and (2).
2012 c. 10	Legal Aid, Sentencing and Punishment of Offenders Act 2012	In section 80, subsections (1) to (8).
2012 c. 10	Legal Aid, Sentencing and Punishment of Offenders Act 2012	Sections 81 to 84.
2012 c. 10	Legal Aid, Sentencing and Punishment of Offenders Act 2012	In section 87, subsections (1) and (2) and (5) to (7).
2012 c. 10	Legal Aid, Sentencing and Punishment of Offenders Act 2012	In section 109, subsections (4) and (7).
2012 c. 10	Legal Aid, Sentencing and Punishment of Offenders Act 2012	Section 110(10).
2012 c. 10	Legal Aid, Sentencing and Punishment of Offenders Act 2012	Section 117(9).
2012 c. 10	Legal Aid, Sentencing and Punishment of Offenders Act 2012	In section 122, subsections (1) and (2).
2012 c. 10	Legal Aid, Sentencing and Punishment of Offenders Act 2012	Section 124.
2012 c. 10	Legal Aid, Sentencing and Punishment of Offenders Act 2012	In Schedule 5—(a) paragraphs 52 to 54; (b) paragraph 69.
2012 c. 10	Legal Aid, Sentencing and Punishment of Offenders Act 2012	In Schedule 9—(a) paragraphs 2 to 12; (b) paragraph 20.
2012 c. 10	Legal Aid, Sentencing and Punishment of Offenders Act 2012	In Schedule 10, paragraph 38(2)(b).
2012 c. 10	Legal Aid, Sentencing and Punishment of Offenders Act 2012	In Schedule 12, paragraphs 42 to 44.
2012 c. 10	Legal Aid, Sentencing and Punishment of Offenders Act 2012	In Schedule 13, paragraphs 9 to 11.
2012 c. 10	Legal Aid, Sentencing and Punishment of Offenders Act 2012	In Schedule 14, paragraph 3.
2012 c. 10	Legal Aid, Sentencing and Punishment of Offenders Act 2012	Schedule 18.
2012 c. 10	Legal Aid, Sentencing and Punishment of Offenders Act 2012	In Schedule 19—(a) paragraphs 3 to 7; (b) paragraphs 10 to 24.
2012 c. 10	Legal Aid, Sentencing and Punishment of Offenders Act 2012	In Schedule 20, paragraphs 3 and 13.
2012 c. 10	Legal Aid, Sentencing and Punishment of Offenders Act 2012	In Schedule 21—(a) paragraphs 7 to 15; (b) paragraphs 21 to 28; (c) paragraphs 34 and 36.
2012 c. 10	Legal Aid, Sentencing and Punishment of Offenders Act 2012	In Schedule 22, paragraphs 14 to 16.
2012 c. 10	Legal Aid, Sentencing and Punishment of Offenders Act 2012	In Schedule 24, paragraphs 18 to 20.
2012 c. 10	Legal Aid, Sentencing and Punishment of Offenders Act 2012	In Schedule 26—(a) paragraphs 9 to 14; (b) paragraphs 16 to 22; (c) paragraph 31.
2013 c. 3	Prevention of Social Housing Fraud Act 2013	In the Schedule, paragraphs 8 and 28 to 30.
2013 c. 22	Crime and Courts Act 2013	In Schedule 16, paragraphs 1 to 8, 10, 12, 13 and 16 to 24.
2014 c. 11	Offender Rehabilitation Act 2014	Section 6.
2014 c. 11	Offender Rehabilitation Act 2014	Section 8.
2014 c. 11	Offender Rehabilitation Act 2014	Section 14(1).
2014 c. 11	Offender Rehabilitation Act 2014	Sections 15 to 17.
2014 c. 11	Offender Rehabilitation Act 2014	In section 18, subsections (1) to (9) and (12).
2014 c. 11	Offender Rehabilitation Act 2014	In Schedule 3, paragraphs 10 to 12.
2014 c. 11	Offender Rehabilitation Act 2014	In Schedule 4, paragraphs 2 to 7 and 11 to 15.
2014 c. 11	Offender Rehabilitation Act 2014	Schedule 5.
2014 c. 11	Offender Rehabilitation Act 2014	In Schedule 6, paragraphs 8 to 11.
2014 c. 11	Offender Rehabilitation Act 2014	In Schedule 7, paragraph 7.
2014 c. 12	Anti-social Behaviour, Crime and Policing Act 2014	Sections 22 to 33.
2014 c. 12	Anti-social Behaviour, Crime and Policing Act 2014	Section 179(3).
2015 c. 2	Criminal Justice and Courts Act 2015	Section 3.
2015 c. 2	Criminal Justice and Courts Act 2015	Section 5(1) and (2).
2015 c. 2	Criminal Justice and Courts Act 2015	Section 15(1) to (3).
2015 c. 2	Criminal Justice and Courts Act 2015	Section 27.
2015 c. 2	Criminal Justice and Courts Act 2015	In section 28, subsections (1) to (7).
2015 c. 2	Criminal Justice and Courts Act 2015	Sections 43 to 45.
2015 c. 2	Criminal Justice and Courts Act 2015	Section 53.
2015 c. 2	Criminal Justice and Courts Act 2015	In section 54, subsections (1) and (4).
2015 c. 2	Criminal Justice and Courts Act 2015	Section 83(1).
2015 c. 2	Criminal Justice and Courts Act 2015	In Schedule 1, paragraphs 2 to 4, 10, 13 and 24.
2015 c. 2	Criminal Justice and Courts Act 2015	In Schedule 5—(a) paragraphs 3 to 8; (b) paragraphs 10 to 17.
2015 c. 2	Criminal Justice and Courts Act 2015	In Schedule 9, paragraph 12.
2015 c. 2	Criminal Justice and Courts Act 2015	In Schedule 11, paragraph 23.
2015 c. 2	Criminal Justice and Courts Act 2015	In Schedule 12, paragraphs 9, 13, 15 and 16.
2015 c. 9	Serious Crime Act 2015	In Schedule 4, paragraph 69.
2015 c. 30	Modern Slavery Act 2015	Section 6(4).
2015 c. 30	Modern Slavery Act 2015	In Schedule 5, paragraphs 14, 24 and 25.
2017 c. 3	Policing and Crime Act 2017	Section 79(3).
2017 c. 16	Children and Social Work Act 2017	In Schedule 5, paragraph 48(b).
2018 c. 23	Assaults on Emergency Workers (Offences) Act 2018	Section 2.
2019 c. 3	Counter-Terrorism and Border Security Act 2019	Section 9(3) and (4).
2019 c. 3	Counter-Terrorism and Border Security Act 2019	In Schedule 4, paragraphs 7 and 9(3).
2019 c. 17	Offensive Weapons Act 2019	Sections 8 and 9.
2019 c. 17	Offensive Weapons Act 2019	In section 13, subsections (1), (4), (6) and (7).
2019 c. 17	Offensive Weapons Act 2019	In Schedule 2, paragraphs 7, 8, 10 and 12.
2020 c. 3	Terrorist Offenders (Restriction of Early Release) Act 2020	Section 7(1).
2020 c. 9	Sentencing (Pre-consolidation Amendments) Act 2020	Schedule 2, apart from paragraphs 45, 114, 115, 121, 123(1), (2), (3), (4), (5) and (7) and 136.
Statutory instruments
SI 2003/1605	Referral Orders (Amendment of Referral Conditions) Regulations 2003	The whole regulations.
SI 2004/2035	Courts Act 2003 (Consequential Amendments) Order 2004	In the Schedule, paragraphs 40 to 43.
SI 2005/643	Criminal Justice Act 2003 (Sentencing) (Transitory Provisions) Order 2005	Article 2.
SI 2005/643	Criminal Justice Act 2003 (Sentencing) (Transitory Provisions) Order 2005	In article 3, paragraphs (2), (3), (4), (6), (8) and (16).
SI 2005/886	Courts Act 2003 (Consequential Provisions) Order 2005	In the Schedule—(a) paragraphs 62 to 65, 67 to 71, 73 to 79, 81, 82, 84 and 85; (b) paragraphs 103 to 107; (c) paragraphs 110 and 111; (d) paragraph 113(a), (e) and (f).
SI 2005/950	Criminal Justice Act 2003 (Commencement No. 8 and Transitional and Saving Provisions) Order 2005	In Schedule 2, paragraphs 4, 5(2)(a) and 7 to 13.
SI 2007/1324	Firearms (Sentencing) (Transitory Provisions) Order 2007	The whole order.
SI 2008/912	Offender Management Act 2007 (Consequential Amendments) Order 2008	In Schedule 1—(a) paragraph 13(4); (b) paragraph 14; (c) in paragraph 19, sub-paragraphs (2), (3), (5) to (13), (17), (20) and (21).
SI 2009/1059	Armed Forces Act 2006 (Transitional Provisions etc) Order 2009	In Schedule 1, paragraph 53(5), (6) and (7).
SI 2009/1059	Armed Forces Act 2006 (Transitional Provisions etc) Order 2009	In Schedule 2, paragraphs 2 to 7 and 9 to 16.
SI 2009/1182	Health Care and Associated Professions (Miscellaneous Amendments and Practitioner Psychologists) Order 2009	In Schedule 5, paragraphs 7 and 10.
SI 2010/197	Criminal Justice Act 2003 (Mandatory Life Sentence: Determination of Minimum Term) Order 2010	The whole order.
SI 2010/813	Health and Social Care Act 2008 (Consequential Amendments No. 2) Order 2010	Articles 10, 14 and 20.
SI 2010/1158	Local Education Authorities and Children's Services Authorities (Integration of Functions) Order 2010	In Schedule 2, paragraphs 45 and 63.
SI 2011/2298	Criminal Justice and Licensing (Scotland) Act 2010 (Consequential Provisions and Modifications) Order 2011	In the Schedule, paragraph 14.
SI 2012/2824	Legal Aid, Sentencing and Punishment of Offenders Act 2012 (Consequential and Saving Provisions) Regulations 2012	Regulation 5.
SI 2015/664	Legal Aid, Sentencing and Punishment of Offenders Act 2012 (Fines on Summary Conviction) Regulations 2015	In Schedule 5, paragraph 3.
SI 2016/413 (W. 131)	Social Services and Well-being (Wales) Act 2014 (Consequential Amendments) Regulations 2016	Regulations 165 to 169, 211, 259 and 260.
SI 2018/195 (W. 44)	Regulation and Inspection of Social Care (Wales) Act 2016 (Consequential Amendments) Regulations 2018	Regulations 24 and 40.
SI 2019/780	Criminal Justice (Amendment etc.) (EU Exit) Regulations 2019	Regulations 21, 25, 26, 27 and 30.

Section 413(2) of the act repealed 15 enactments, listed in schedule 29 to the act, so far as they extended to England and Wales.

Citation	Short title	Extent of repeal or revocation
1968 c. 27	Firearms Act 1968	In section 51A—(a) subsections (1) to (3); (b) subsections (4) and (5), so far as not repealed by Schedule 28.
1971 c. 38	Misuse of Drugs Act 1971	In section 4A, subsections (1) to (7).
1982 c. 48	Criminal Justice Act 1982	Section 37.
1991 c. 53	Criminal Justice Act 1991	Section 17(1).
2003 c. 44	Criminal Justice Act 2003	Section 291(1)(a).
2005 c. 15	Serious Organised Crime and Police Act 2005	Sections 73 to 75, so far as not repealed by Schedule 28.
2005 c. 17	Drugs Act 2005	Section 1.
2006 c. 38	Violent Crime Reduction Act 2006	In section 29, subsections (11) and (12).
2006 c. 38	Violent Crime Reduction Act 2006	In section 30, subsections (2) and (3).
2007 c. 30	UK Borders Act 2007	Section 25, so far as not repealed by Schedule 28.
2008 c. 28	Counter-Terrorism Act 2008	Sections 30 and 33.
2008 c. 28	Counter-Terrorism Act 2008	Schedule 2.
2014 c. 12	Anti-social Behaviour, Crime and Policing Act 2014	Section 108(6).
2016 c. 2	Psychoactive Substances Act 2016	In section 6, subsections (1) to (4) and (6) to (10).
2018 c. 5	Space Industry Act 2018	In Schedule 12, paragraph 29.
2019 c. 3	Counter-Terrorism and Border Security Act 2019	Section 8(6)(a).
2019 c. 17	Offensive Weapons Act 2019	Section 54(6).

== See also ==
- Sentencing in England and Wales
- Sentencing (Pre-consolidation Amendments) Act 2020
