= Education and Skills Act 2008 =

Act of the Parliament of the United Kingdom

Education and Skills Act 2008 (Note: Section 174(1).)
- Act of Parliament
- Parliament of the United Kingdom
- Long title: An Act to make provision about education and training; and for connected purposes.
- Citation: 2008 c. 25
- Introduced by: Ed Balls, Secretary of State for Children, Schools and Families (Commons); Lord Adonis, Parliamentary Under-Secretary of State for Schools and Learners (Lords)
- Territorial extent: England and Wales; Scotland (in part); Northern Ireland (in part); (Note: Section 172.)

Dates
- Royal assent: 26 November 2008
- Commencement: Various (Note: Section 173.)
Other legislation
Amends	Social Security Administration Act 1992; Education Act 1994; Education Act 1996; Government of Wales Act 2006; National Health Service (Consequential Provisions) Act 2006; Safeguarding Vulnerable Groups Act 2006
Amended by	Sentencing (Pre-consolidation Amendments) Act 2020; Sentencing Act 2020

Status: Amended

History of passage through Parliament

Text of statute as originally enacted

Revised text of statute as amended

The Education and Skills Act 2008 (c. 25) is an act of the Parliament of the United Kingdom that added additional requirements for those post school leaving age (16), to be in either full-time (or part-time) work, or further education (ie. college) when aged 16-17. The act does not apply in Scotland, Northern Ireland or Wales, in those nations the school-leaving age remains around 16, without additional requirements (depending on the person's birthday).

This part of the act has been described as "exhum[ing] fundamental questions about the purposes of statutory state education". There was some criticism, based on the theory that the government wanted to decrease unemployment figures by removing this group of young people from those looking for work. It was certainly intended to bring down the NEET figures.

The act also introduced a number of other changes including the right of choice and appeal for young people regarding their sixth form college, and placing duties on the Learning and Skills Council regarding payment and finance of courses for both children and adults.

== See also ==
- Education Act
- Halsbury's Statutes
