= Sentencing (Pre-consolidation Amendments) Act 2020 =

UK law amending existing sentencing legislation

Sentencing (Pre-consolidation Amendments) Act 2020 (Note: Section 5(12).)
- Act of Parliament
- Parliament of the United Kingdom
- Long title: An Act to give effect to Law Commission recommendations relating to commencement of enactments relating to sentencing law and to make provision for pre-consolidation amendments of sentencing law
- Citation: 2020 c. 9
- Introduced by: Robert Buckland (Commons); Lord Keen of Elie (Lords)
- Territorial extent: England and Wales; Scotland (in part); Isle of Man (in part); Gibraltar (in part); (Note: Section 5(4)–(11).)

Dates
- Royal assent: 8 June 2020
- Commencement: 8 June 2020 (Note: Section 5(1)–(3).)
Other legislation
Amends	Criminal Procedure (Insanity) Act 1964; Firearms Act 1968; Magistrates' Courts Act 1980; Protection of Military Remains Act 1986; Protection from Harassment Act 1997; Crime and Disorder Act 1998; Powers of Criminal Courts (Sentencing) Act 2000; Criminal Justice and Courts Services Act 2000; Proceeds of Crime Act 2002; Criminal Justice Act 2003; Constitutional Reform Act 2005; Criminal Justice Act 2003 (Sentencing) (Transitory Provisions) Order 2005; Courts Act 2003 (Consequential Provisions) Order 2005; Armed Forces Act 2006; Tribunals, Courts and Enforcement Act 2007; Firearms (Sentencing) (Transitory Provisions) Order 2007; Criminal Justice and Immigration Act 2008; Education and Skills Act 2008; Coroners and Justice Act 2009; Anti-social Behaviour, Crime and Policing Act 2014
Amended by	Sentencing Act 2020

Status: Partially repealed

History of passage through Parliament

Records of Parliamentary debate relating to the statute from Hansard

Text of statute as originally enacted

Revised text of statute as amended

The Sentencing (Pre-consolidation Amendments) Act 2020 (c. 9) is an act of the Parliament of the United Kingdom to make amendments to existing legislation in order to facilitate the future enactment of the Law Commission's Sentencing Code (to be enacted as the Sentencing Act 2020).

The intention of the act was to correct minor errors and to streamline the law in respect of areas which are to be consolidated under the Sentencing Act 2020. The overall purpose of the law (together with the Sentencing Act 2020) is to remove historic and redundant layers of sentencing procedural legislation without introducing new sentencing law.

== Provisions ==
=== Main provisions ===
Clause 1 provides for a "clean sweep" to remove the need to identify and apply historic versions of the law, minimising the use of complex transitional provisions. The clean sweep is subject to exceptions to ensure that no offender is subject to a greater penalty than that available at the time of the offence, or subject to a minimum or mandatory sentence that did not apply at the time of the offence.

Clause 2 provides for amendments and modifications of existing sentencing legislation to allow for a consistent consolidation and gives powers to the Secretary of State to make further amendments by way of statutory instrument.

The remaining clauses deal with interpretation, how regulations may be laid, the commencement, extent and short title of the act.

=== Schedules ===
Schedule 1 provides for a list of exemptions to the "clean sweep" which are required in order to comply with Article 7 of the European Convention on Human Rights and so as not to breach common law standards of fairness.

Schedule 2 provides for pre-consolidation amendments to existing legislation to enable the enactment of consolidation. Such amendment include amendments to the Powers of Criminal Courts (Sentencing) Act 2000, Criminal Justice Act 2003, Criminal Justice and Immigration Act 2008, Armed Forces Act 2006 and other primary and secondary legislation relating to sentencing.
