= Children Act 2004 =

Act of the Parliament of the United Kingdom

Children Act 2004 (Note: Section 69.)
- Act of Parliament
- Parliament of the United Kingdom
- Long title: An Act to make provision for the establishment of a Children's Commissioner; to make provision about services provided to and for children and young people by local authorities and other persons; to make provision in relation to Wales about advisory and support services relating to family proceedings; to make provision about private fostering, child minding and day care, adoption review panels, the defence of reasonable punishment, the making of grants as respects children and families, child safety orders, the Children's Commissioner for Wales, the publication of material relating to children involved in certain legal proceedings and the disclosure by the Inland Revenue of information relating to children.
- Citation: 2004 c. 31
- Territorial extent: England and Wales; Scotland (in part); Northern Ireland (in part); (Note: Section 68.)

Dates
- Royal assent: 15 November 2004
- Commencement: Various (Note: Section 67.)
Other legislation
Amends	House of Commons Disqualification Act 1975; Domestic Proceedings and Magistrates' Courts Act 1978; Magistrates' Courts Act 1980; Education Act 1996; Criminal Justice and Court Services Act 2000
Repeals/revokes	Children Act 1989; Education Act 1997; School Standards and Framework Act 1998; Learning and Skills Act 2000; Adoption and Children Act 2002; Education Act 2002; Children and Young Persons Act 1933; Children and Young Persons Act 1963; Local Authority Social Services Act 1970; Local Government Act 1972; Mental Health Act 1983; Police and Criminal Evidence Act 1984; Local Government and Housing Act 1989; Criminal Justice Act 1991; Crime (Sentences) Act 1997; Crime and Disorder Act 1998; Powers of Criminal Courts (Sentencing) Act 2000; Local Government Act 2000; Criminal Justice and Court Services Act 2000; Criminal Justice Act 2003
Amended by	National Health Service (Consequential Provisions) Act 2006; Safeguarding Vulnerable Groups Act 2006; Criminal Justice and Courts Act 2015; Sentencing Act 2020; Domestic Abuse Act 2021

Status: Amended

Text of statute as originally enacted

Revised text of statute as amended

The Children Act 2004 (c. 31) is an act of the Parliament of the United Kingdom.

The act amended the Children Act 1989, largely in consequence of the Victoria Climbié inquiry.

The act is now the basis for most official administration that is considered helpful to children, notably bringing all local government functions of children's welfare and education under the statutory authority of local Directors of Children's Services. The act also created the ContactPoint database; this, however, has since been axed.

== Purpose ==
The purpose of the act was to give boundaries and help for local authorities and/or other entities to better regulate official intervention in the interests of children.This act ultimate purpose is to make the UK better and safer for children of all ages. The goal behind the act is to promote (co-ordination) between multiple official entities to improve the overall well-being of children. The 2004 Act also specifically provided for measures including and affecting disabled children.

== History ==
The long history of children's welfare legislation had given rise to numerous unco-ordinated official powers and functions, even within the same local authorities, resulting in the tragic maladministration seen in the Climbié case. Along with the Children Act 1989 and the Children Act 2004, there were reports in 2002, 2003, and 2004–05. Each act has progressively attempted to improve the legal powers and official functions related to children in all forms, and to make official provision for children. In family courts this version of the act is very rarely referred to with the Children's Act 1989 more favourably used.

== Provisions ==
The act contains a "moderate" ban on smacking. This prohibition banned "punishment which causes visible bruising, grazes, scratches, minor swellings or cuts".

The act established the Children's Commissioner for England.

=== Local Children's Safeguarding Boards ===
Section 13 provides for the creation and multi-agency representation of a Local Children's Safeguarding Board in each council area.

== Further developments ==
In 2024, the BBC reported that the UK government was considering introducing a smacking ban for England.

== Commencement ==
The following commencement orders have been made for this act:

- Children Act 2004 (Commencement No. 1) Order 2005 (SI 2005/394)
- Children Act 2004 (Commencement No. 2) Order 2005 (SI 2005/700)
- Children Act 2004 (Commencement No. 3) Order 2005 (SI 2005/847)
- Children Act 2004 (Commencement No. 4 and Savings) (England) Order 2005 (SI 2005/2298)
- Children Act 2004 (Commencement No. 5) Order 2005 (SI 2005/3464)
- Children Act 2004 (Commencement No. 5) (Wales) Order 2005 (SI 2005/3363)
- Children Act 2004 (Commencement No. 6) (Wales) Order 2006 (SI 2006/885)
- Children Act 2004 (Commencement No. 7) (Wales) Order 2006 (SI 2006/870)
- Children Act 2004 (Commencement No. 8) Order 2006 (SI 2006/927)
- Children Act 2004 (Commencement No. 8) (Wales) Order 2008 (SI 2008/1904)
- Children Act 2004 (Commencement No. 9) Order 2008 (SI 2008/752)
