= Criminal Justice and Immigration Act 2008 =

Act of the Parliament of the United Kingdom

Criminal Justice and Immigration Act 2008 (Note: Section 154.)
- Act of Parliament
- Parliament of the United Kingdom
- Long title: An Act to make further provision about criminal justice (including provision about the police) and dealing with offenders and defaulters; to make further provision about the management of offenders; to amend the criminal law; to make further provision for combatting crime and disorder; to make provision about the mutual recognition of financial penalties; to amend the Repatriation of Prisoners Act 1984; to make provision for a new immigration status in certain cases involving criminality; to make provision about the automatic deportation of criminals under the UK Borders Act 2007; to amend section 127 of the Criminal Justice and Public Order Act 1994 and to confer power to suspend the operation of that section; and for connected purposes.
- Citation: 2008 c. 4
- Introduced by: David Hanson (Commons)
- Territorial extent: England and Wales; Scotland (in part); Northern Ireland (in part); (Note: Section 152.)

Dates
- Royal assent: 8 May 2008
- Commencement: mostly on 14 July 2008; see below for further dates (Note: Section 153.)
Other legislation
| Amends | Law of Libel Amendment Act 1888; Obscene Publications Act 1959; Criminal Appeal Act 1968; Courts-Martial (Appeals) Act 1968; Bail Act 1976; Judicature (Northern Ireland) Act 1978; Protection of Children Act 1978; Customs and Excise Management Act 1979; Magistrates' Courts Act 1980; Criminal Appeal (Northern Ireland) Act 1980; Repatriation of Prisoners Act 1984; Criminal Justice Act 1988; Football Spectators Act 1989; Criminal Justice and Public Order Act 1994; Criminal Procedure (Scotland) Act 1995; Police Act 1996; Education Act 1996; Youth Justice and Criminal Evidence Act 1999; Legal Services Act 2007 |
| Amended by | Sentencing (Pre-consolidation Amendments) Act 2020; Sentencing Act 2020; Domestic Abuse Act 2021 |
| Relates to | UK Borders Act 2007 |

Status: Amended

History of passage through Parliament

Text of statute as originally enacted

Revised text of statute as amended

The Criminal Justice and Immigration Act 2008 (c. 4) is an act of the Parliament of the United Kingdom which makes significant changes in many areas of the criminal justice system in England and Wales and, to a lesser extent, in Scotland and Northern Ireland. In particular, it changes the law relating to custodial sentences and the early release of prisoners to reduce prison overcrowding, which reached crisis levels in 2008. It also reduces the right of prison officers to take industrial action, and changed the law on the deportation of foreign criminals. It received royal assent on 8 May 2008, but most of its provisions came into force on various later dates. Many sections came into force on 14 July 2008.

== Specific provisions ==
=== Sentencing ===
==== Non-custodial sentences ====
Section 1 of the act provides a comprehensive list of new community orders, called youth rehabilitation orders, which can be imposed on offenders aged under 18. They can only be imposed if the offence is imprisonable (i.e. an adult could receive a prison sentence for the offence) and, if the offender is aged under 15, he is a persistent offender. Neither of these criteria are necessary under the old law. (This section and sections 2 to 4 came into force on 30 November 2009.)

Section 11 deals with adult offenders, and provides that adult community orders may not be imposed unless the offence is imprisonable, or unless the offender has been fined (without additional punishment) on three previous occasions. (This section came into force on 14 July 2008.)

Section 35 extends the availability of referral orders (sentences designed to rehabilitate young offenders). Previously only available to first offenders, referral orders may be passed on offenders with previous convictions, subject to certain conditions being met. (This section came into force on 27 April 2009.)

All of these sections were repealed and replaced by the Sentencing Act 2020.

==== Dangerous offenders ====
The Criminal Justice Act 2003 introduced mandatory sentencing for violent and sexual offenders, which significantly reduced judicial discretion in sentencing defendants who judges considered were a danger to the public. The increase in life sentences and "extended sentences" which resulted contributed to a major crisis of prison overcrowding, in which the prison population of England and Wales reached unprecedented levels. Sections 13 to 17 restored a proportion of judicial discretion and imposed stricter criteria for the imposition of such sentences. Section 25 provided for the automatic early release of prisoners serving extended (as opposed to life) sentences, instead of discretionary release by the Parole Board. (These sections all came into force on 14 July 2008.)

==== Curfew ====
English law already provided the courts with the power to impose a curfew as a condition of bail, and the power to require the defendant to wear an electronic tag to monitor compliance. Section 21 introduces a new power enabling a court which imposes a custodial sentence to order that half of the time for which the defendant was on a curfew is to count as time served towards that sentence, provided that the curfew was in force for at least 9 hours each day and that it was monitored by a tag. Although there is a presumption that the court is to make such an order, the court may decline to do so, and is obliged to take into account any breaches of the bail condition. (This power only applies to offences committed on or after 4 April 2005, the last date on which major changes to sentencing were made. This section came into force on 3 November 2008.)

==== Obscene publications ====
Section 71 increases the maximum sentence for publishing an obscene article under section 2 of the Obscene Publications Act 1959 from 3 to 5 years. (This section came into force on 26 January 2009.)

=== Offences ===
==== Extreme pornographic images ====
Section 63 creates a new offence of possessing "an extreme pornographic image".

An image is deemed to be extreme if it "is grossly offensive, disgusting or otherwise of an obscene character" and "it portrays, in an explicit and realistic way, any of the following—

(a) an act which threatens a person's life,
(b) an act which results, or is likely to result, in serious injury to a person's anus, breasts or genitals,
(c) an act which involves sexual interference with a human corpse, or
(d) a person performing an act of intercourse or oral sex with an animal (whether dead or alive),
and a reasonable person looking at the image would think that any such person or animal was real".

Where (a) or (b) apply, the maximum sentence is three years; otherwise the maximum is two years. Those sentenced to at least two years will be placed on the Violent and Sex Offender Register.

Section 64 excludes classified works, but states that extracts from classified works are not exempt, if "it is of such a nature that it must reasonably be assumed to have been extracted (whether with or without other images) solely or principally for the purpose of sexual arousal".

Sections 65 to 66 provide defences to this offence.

(These sections all came into force on 26 January 2009.)

==== Child pornography ====
Section 69 extends the definition of indecent photographs in the Protection of Children Act 1978 (which creates offences relating to child pornography) to cover tracings of such photographs or pseudo-photographs.

==== Child sex offences ====
Section 72 amends section 72 of the Sexual Offences Act 2003 to extend extraterritorial jurisdiction over sexual offences against children overseas. Section 73 and Schedule 15 extend the definition of the offence of child grooming. (These provisions all came into force on 14 July 2008.)

==== Hate crimes ====
Section 74 and Schedule 16 amend Part 3A of the Public Order Act 1986 to extend hate crime legislation to cover "hatred against a group of persons defined by reference to sexual orientation (whether towards persons of the same sex, the opposite sex or both)".

To prevent the Act being used to inhibit freedom of speech on the subject of homosexuality, paragraph 14 of Schedule 16 inserts a new section 29JA, entitled "Protection of freedom of expression (sexual orientation)" but sometimes known as the Waddington Amendment (after Lord Waddington who introduced it). It reads:

In this Part, for the avoidance of doubt, the discussion or criticism of sexual conduct or practices or the urging of persons to refrain from or modify such conduct or practices shall not be taken of itself to be threatening or intended to stir up hatred.

The government tried to insert a clause in the 2009 Coroners and Justice Bill which would have explicitly repealed section 29JA, but the proposed repeal failed and section 29JA remains. The section was extended to protect criticism of gay marriage by the Marriage (Same Sex Couples) Act 2013.

Section 74 and Schedule 16 came into force on 23 March 2010.

==== Nuclear terrorism ====
Section 75 and Schedule 17 make major amendments to the Nuclear Material (Offences) Act 1983 to extend extraterritorial jurisdiction over offences under section 1 of that Act, and to increase penalties. It also creates new offences (under sections 1B and 1C) pertaining to nuclear and radioactive material, also with extraterritorial jurisdiction. (This section came into force on 30 November 2009.)

==== Blasphemy ====
Section 79 abolished the common law offences of blasphemy and blasphemous libel in England and Wales. This section came into force two months after royal assent (that is, on 8 July 2008).

=== Violent offender orders ===
Part 7 (sections 98 to 117) creates violent offender orders. These are orders made by a magistrates' court under section 101 to control violent offenders, and are similar to anti-social behaviour orders. They must be "necessary for the purpose of protecting the public from the risk of serious violent harm caused by the offender". (Part 7 came into force on 3 August 2009.)

==== Applications for an order ====
To be eligible for an order a person must be at least 18, have been convicted of a "specified offence" (or an equivalent offence under the law of a foreign country), and have received a sentence of at least one year in prison or incarceration in a psychiatric hospital. The "specified offences" are manslaughter, attempted murder, conspiracy to murder, and offences under sections 4, 18 or 20 of the Offences against the Person Act 1861 (inciting murder and serious assaults). A conviction for murder under the law of a foreign country is also sufficient; this was added by section 119 of the Anti-social Behaviour, Crime and Policing Act 2014, which came into force on 13 May 2014.

Before deciding whether to make the order, a court may make an interim violent offender order, which lasts until it decides whether or not to make a final order. The court may make an interim order if it decides that it would be "likely" to make a final order if it were dealing with the main application.

An application for a final or interim order can only be made by the police, who can only apply for one if the offender has, since he became eligible for the order, acted in a way that "gives reasonable cause" to believe that the order is necessary. The defendant must be served with a notice giving the time and place of the hearing at which the application will be made. The court must be satisfied that the notice was given before it can hear the application. The court may only make the final order if it decides that the order is necessary to protect the public from "a current risk of serious physical or psychological harm caused by that person committing one or more specified offences". When making this decision the court must take into account any other statutory measures that are in place to protect the public from the person. If the order is made, the defendant may appeal to the Crown Court, which does not review the decision but decides the matter afresh for itself.

==== Effect of an order ====
A final violent offender order lasts for between two and five years, but may be renewed for up to five years at a time. It may not be in force during any time that the offender is in custody or on parole subject to licence. After two years the defendant may apply to the magistrates' court to have the order discharged.

A final or interim order "may contain prohibitions, restrictions or conditions preventing the offender— (a) from going to any specified premises or any other specified place (whether at all, or at or between any specified time or times); (b) from attending any specified event; (c) from having any, or any specified description of, contact with any specified individual". The offender must also notify the police, within 3 days of the order being made, of his date of birth, national insurance number, his name on the date the order came into force and on the day he notifies the police (or all of his names if he uses more than one), his home address on each of those dates, and the address of any other premises in the United Kingdom at which on the latter date the offender regularly resides or stays, and any other information prescribed by regulations. He must repeat the notification every year (except if it is an interim order), and must notify any subsequent change of name or address within 3 days of the change. He may be fingerprinted and photographed by the police whenever he gives any of these notifications. If he leaves the United Kingdom he may also be required (by regulations made under the Act) to notify, before he leaves, the date he intends to leave, where he intends to go, his movements outside the UK, and any information about his return.

Breaching a violent offender order (whether it is a final or interim order), or failing to make a required notification on time, is an offence punishable with imprisonment for 5 years.

=== Miscellaneous ===
==== Early release of prisoners ====
Section 26 brought forward the release date of prisoners serving sentences greater than 4 years imposed before 4 April 2005. It did not apply to prisoners serving life sentences or serving sentences for violent or sexual offences. This section came into force on 9 June 2008. This was in order to alleviate prison overcrowding.

==== Absence of defendants ====
Section 54 creates a presumption that when an adult defendant fails to attend a magistrates' court for his trial or sentence, the hearing should continue without him. (This section came into force on 14 July 2008.)

==== Non-legal staff ====
Before the Act, the Crown Prosecution Service already employed staff who were not qualified lawyers to prosecute cases at pre-trial hearings and sentences in the magistrates' court. Section 55 grants them the right to prosecute trials for offences which are non-imprisonable and not triable on indictment. The original version of this section, when the Act was still a bill, would have allowed them to prosecute imprisonable, indictable offences. This proved to be controversial, and was amended following representations by concerned groups such as the Bar Council. (This section came into force on 14 July 2008.)

==== Self-defence ====
Section 76 codifies English and Northern Irish case law on the subject of self-defence. However it made no changes to the existing law. The Secret Barrister described this as "an exercise of pure political conmanship", since politicians had pretended that they were strengthening the right of self-defence.

The section was amended on 25 April 2013 by section 43 of the Crime and Courts Act 2013 to allow people to use greater force in defence of their homes against burglars. The government told the public that in those circumstances, the new law meant that force need no longer be reasonable as long as it is not "grossly disproportionate". However, in a 2016 court case the government's lawyer successfully argued that this was not what the law really said, and that the primary test a jury would have to consider was still whether reasonable force had been used. Section 76, as amended, only meant that grossly disproportionate force would never be reasonable, not that merely disproportionate force would always be reasonable.

==== Anti-social behaviour ====
Section 118 created a new Part 1A to the Anti-social Behaviour Act 2003. This permitted police and local authorities to apply for a court order to close for a period of three months residential premises associated with persistent noise and nuisance. This section came into force on 1 December 2008.

When an ASBO was made on a person aged under 17, section 123 required the courts to review the order every twelve months, until the subject of the order is 18. This section came into force on 1 February 2009.

These sections, along with the relevant sections of the 2003 Act, were repealed, and thereby ASBOs abolished, by the Anti-social Behaviour, Crime and Policing Act 2014.

==== Public order ====
Section 119 created a new offence of causing "a nuisance or disturbance" to a member of staff of the National Health Service. It is non-imprisonable and carries a maximum fine of £1,000. This section came into force on 30 November 2009.

Section 122 makes similar provision for Northern Ireland.

==== Foreign criminals ====
Part 10 of the Act (sections 130 to 137) gives the Secretary of State the power to designate as "foreign criminals" certain criminals who are not British citizens and do not have the right of abode. Designated foreign criminals have a special status under immigration law, and may be required to comply with conditions as to their residence, employment, and compulsory reporting to the police or a government office. Failure to comply is an imprisonable offence. As of May 2026, Part 10 is not yet in force.

==== Prison officers ====
Section 138 curtails the right of prison officers to strike. This section came into force on royal assent.

==== Child sex offenders ====
Section 140 requires local authorities to consider disclosing to members of the public details about the previous convictions of convicted child sex offenders. (This legislation took effect as new sections 327A and 327B of the Criminal Justice Act 2003, on 14 July 2008.)

==== Tobacco ====
Section 143 inserts new sections 12A to 12D into the Children and Young Persons Act 1933. These create two new civil orders, which may be imposed by the magistrates' courts, prohibiting the sale of tobacco or cigarette paper, or keeping a cigarette vending machine, for up to one year. Breaching the order is a summary offence punishable with a fine of up to £20,000 (the usual maximum on summary convictions is £5,000). These orders (called restricted premises orders and restricted sale orders) can be imposed on anyone who has been convicted of an offence under section 7 of the 1933 Act, which prohibits selling tobacco to children under 18. (Section 143 came into force on 1 April 2009.)

== Commencement ==
Section 153 of the Act provides that most of its sections will come into force on dates to be determined by the Secretary of State. However the restriction on prison officers' right to strike came into force on royal assent (8 May 2008), and the abolition of the offence of blasphemy came into force two months later.

Eighteen commencement orders have been made under section 153. The second one brought most of the remaining provisions into effect on 14 July 2008.

=== Commencement orders ===
1. Criminal Justice and Immigration Act 2008 (Commencement No.1 and Transitional Provisions) Order 2008. Brought into force section 26 (in part) on 9 June 2008.
2. Criminal Justice and Immigration Act 2008 (Commencement No. 2 and Transitional and Saving Provisions) Order 2008. Brought into force sections 10, 11(1), 12–18, 20, 24–25, 27–32, 38, 40, 42–47 (except 46(2)), 52, 54–59, 72–73, 76, 93–97, 140–142, Schedules 5, 8, 12, 15, 24, and miscellaneous amendments of other legislation on 14 July 2008.
3. Criminal Justice and Immigration Act 2008 (Commencement No. 3 and Transitional Provisions) Order 2008. Brought into force sections 21 (except 21(2)), 22–23, 33(1), (3), (5) and (6), 34 (mostly), 41, 51, 60, 126(1) (in part), 127 (in part), 129, Schedules 6, 11, 22 (in part), 23 (in part), and miscellaneous amendments of other legislation on 3 November 2008.
4. Criminal Justice and Immigration Act 2008 (Commencement No. 4 and Saving Provision) Order 2008. Brought into force sections 61, 118, 126 (in part), 127 (in part), Schedules 20, 22 (in part), 23 (in part), 27 (in part) and 28 (in part) on 1 December 2008. Also brought into force sections 63–68, 71, Schedules 14, 26 (paragraph 58 only) and 27 (paragraphs 23 and 25 only) on 26 January 2009.
5. Criminal Justice and Immigration Act 2008 (Commencement No. 5) Order 2008. Brought into force sections 49-50, Schedules 10, and 27 (paragraphs 19 and 20 only) on 19 December 2008. Also brought into force sections 119(4), 120(5) and (6), and 121(1) to (3), (5) and (6) on 1 January 2009 in England only; those provisions were brought into force in Wales on 11 April 2025 by the Criminal Justice and Immigration Act 2008 (Commencement No. 1) (Wales) Order 2025.
6. Criminal Justice and Immigration Act 2008 (Commencement No. 6 and Transitional Provisions) Order 2009. Brought into force sections 48(1)(a), 123, 124, Schedules 9 (in part) and 27 (paragraphs 33 and 34 only) on 1 February 2009.
7. Criminal Justice and Immigration Act 2008 (Commencement No. 7) Order 2009. Brought into force sections 125, 143, 146, Schedules 1 (paragraphs 26(5) and 35) and 28 (Part 7) on 1 April 2009. Also brought into force sections 35-37 on 27 April 2009.
8. Criminal Justice and Immigration Act 2008 (Commencement No. 8) Order 2009. Brought into force most of Schedule 25 on 31 October 2009.
9. Criminal Justice and Immigration Act 2008 (Commencement No. 9) Order 2009. Brought into force some miscellaneous provisions on 8 July 2009.
10. Criminal Justice and Immigration Act 2008 (Commencement No. 10) Order 2009. Brought into force sections 98–117 on 3 August 2009.
11. Criminal Justice and Immigration Act 2008 (Commencement No. 11) Order 2009. Brought into force sections 80–92 and Schedules 18 and 19 on 1 October 2009. Also brought into force sections 21, 26 (fully) and 29 on 31 October 2009.
12. Criminal Justice and Immigration Act 2008 (Commencement No. 12) Order 2009. Brought into force section 48(1)(b) and some miscellaneous provisions in Cambridgeshire, Hampshire, Humberside, Merseyside, and Norfolk only, on 16 November 2009.
13. Criminal Justice and Immigration Act 2008 (Commencement No.13 and Transitory Provision) Order 2009. Brought into force sections 1 to 5, 6 (in part), 7, 8, 75, sections 119 to 121 (in England only), Schedules 1 to 3, 4 (in part) and 17, and other miscellaneous provisions on 30 November 2009. Section 122 and Schedule 21, which make provision for Northern Ireland equivalent to sections 119 to 121, were brought into force on 22 June 2009 by the Criminal Justice and Immigration (2008 Act) (Commencement No. 1) Order (Northern Ireland) 2009. Sections 119 to 121 were brought into force in Wales on 16 January 2026 by the Criminal Justice and Immigration Act 2008 (Commencement No. 2) (Wales) Order 2025.
14. Criminal Justice and Immigration Act 2008 (Commencement No.14) Order 2010. Brought into force section 74, Schedule 16, and other miscellaneous provisions on 23 March 2010. Also brought into force section 144 on 6 April 2010 and some other miscellaneous provisions on 1 April 2010.
15. Criminal Justice and Immigration Act 2008 (Commencement No. 15) Order 2013. Brought into force section 148(1) and paragraphs 59, 60 and 62 of Schedule 26 on 8 April 2013.

== See also ==
- Criminal Justice Act
- Immigration Act
