= Death of Charlie Millers =

English transgender boy (died 2020)

Charlie Millers
- Born: April 17, 2003; Stretford, Greater Manchester, England
- Died: December 7, 2020 (aged 17); Salford Royal Hospital
- Known for: His death, which led to an inquest that highlighted multi-agency failures in his care.

Charlie Millers was a transgender boy from Stretford, Greater Manchester, England. His death while an inpatient on a mental health ward led to a public inquest that highlighted multi-agency failures in his care.

== Early life and background ==
Born female, Millers came out as a transgender boy at the age of 12. He was diagnosed with ADHD, autism and emerging emotionally unstable personality disorder, and had experienced behavioural issues since being in primary school, before attending Lostock High School, Eccles College, and The Manchester College. His family described him as a talented artist who loved Morris dancing, football, and animals. Millers was subjected to severe bullying at school related to his gender identity. He once threatened to jump from the roof of his school. He also experienced sexual abuse for several years and had acid thrown on him.

== Mental health and care history ==
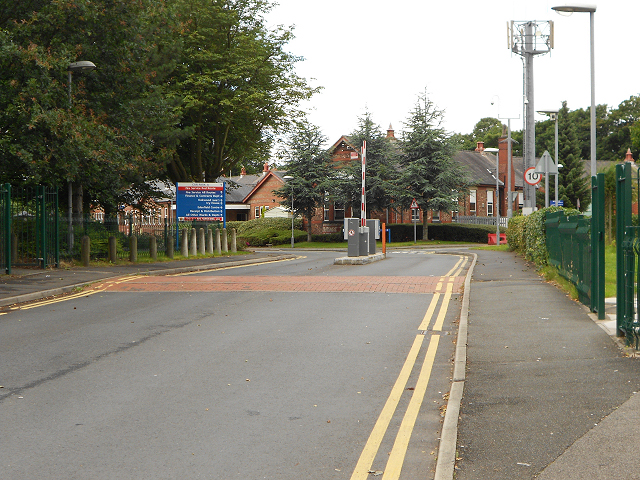
The entrance of Prestwich Hospital, where Millers was admitted in a mental ward

Millers struggled with poor mental health from childhood, with his condition worsening in his teenage years. He received support from Trafford Council's children's services due to his history of self-harm and suicide attempts. Miller was admitted to the Junction 17 mental health ward at Prestwich Hospital on three separate occasions in the months before his death. Millers was referred to the Gender Identity Development Service (GIDS) when he was nearly 14. An inquest heard that he was due to progress to medical interventions, including hormone blockers, but his mental health and self-harming needed to stabilise before he could be placed on a treatment plan.

== Death ==
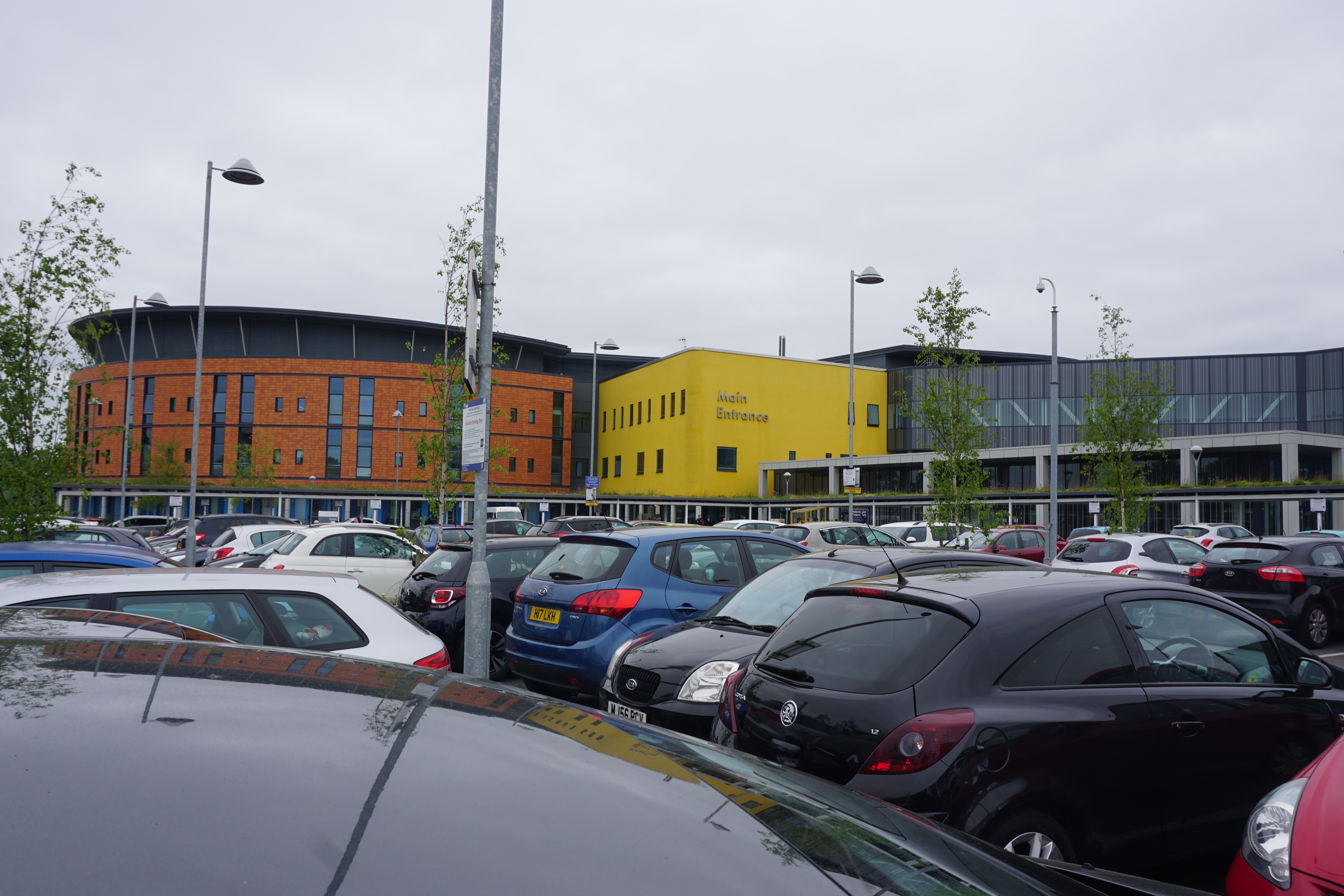
Salford Royal Hospital, where Millers died

On 2 December 2020, Millers was found unresponsive in his room on the Junction 17 ward after hanging himself. He was taken to Salford Royal Hospital, where he died five days later, on 7 December 2020, from a hypoxic brain injury. He was 17 years old. Millers was the third young patient at Prestwich Hospital to die at the hospital in less than a year.

== Inquest ==
The inquest into Millers' death began on 8 April 2024 at Rochdale Coroners' Court. The inquest was initially delayed for over a year due to a Greater Manchester Police investigation into the circumstances of his death, which was launched after questions were raised about whether hospital records had been altered. The police investigation concluded there was insufficient evidence for criminal charges, allowing the inquest to proceed.

The jury found that there were multi-agency failings leading up to his death and that he did not intend to die. The inquest identified multiple failures in his care, including inadequate communication between Trafford Children’s Services and mental health services, the failure to provide practical support to his mother and siblings, and inconsistent and incomplete record-keeping by staff. The jury also found that the patient observation system was flawed and inconsistent, and concluded that the decision not to place him on one-to-one observations probably contributed to his death.

=== Aftermath ===
Following the jury's verdict, the coroner issued a prevention of future deaths report, a legal tool used by coroners to raise concerns that may lead to further deaths unless action is taken. The report was sent to agencies involved in his care such as Greater Manchester Mental Health NHS Foundation Trust. In response to the inquest's findings, Millers' family called for a public inquiry into the trust. His mother stated that a public inquiry was needed because three deaths had occurred in nine months due to similar observation failings.

== See also ==
- Alice Litman
- Jason Pulman
- Ellis Murphy-Richards
- Cass Review
