= Death of Ellis Murphy-Richards =

Transgender boy from Kent

Ellis Murphy-Richards
- Born: Kent, England
- Died: Sheerness, England
- Cause of death: Suicide
- Body discovered: 30 September 2020

Ellis Murphy-Richards was a 15-year-old transgender boy from Kent who received long-term mental health care from the North East London NHS Foundation Trust. He had attended Oasis Academy Isle of Sheppey and Highsted Grammar School, and died by suicide in Sheerness in September 2020, aged 15. The circumstances of his death, examined during an inquest, were controversial and led to concerns over the care he received.

== Life ==
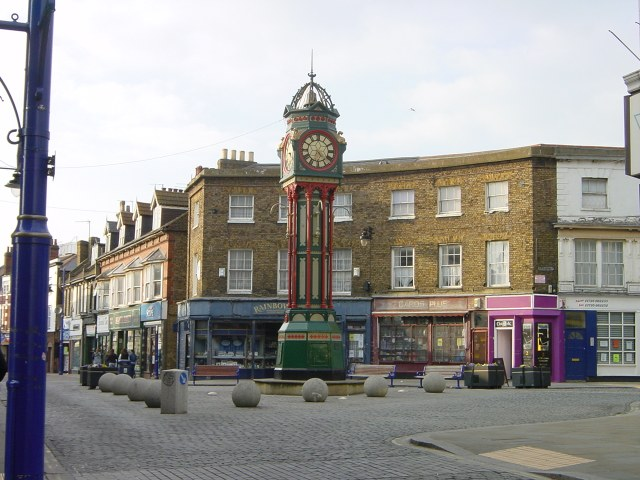
Sheerness, where Murphy-Richards had his counselling sessions and died.

Murphy-Richards had been a pupil at Oasis Academy Isle of Sheppey and Highsted Grammar School and a voluntary inpatient for mental health treatment for around four months in 2020 at Priory Hospital and Kent and Medway Adolescent Hospital. Known for his intelligence, musical ability, use of British Sign Language, and LGBTQ+ advocacy, he lived with his grandmother in Faversham. Murphy-Richards suffered with depression, emotional instability, and impulsive behaviour. He also engaged in self-harm, experienced repeated suicidal ideation, and undertook prior suicide attempts involving bridges, trains, and ligatures. He had been receiving long-term care from the Child and Adolescent Mental Health Services (CAMHS) service of North East London NHS Foundation Trust (NELFT).

On 29 September 2020, Murphy-Richards attempted suicide at his grandmother's house. The following day, his grandmother told a psychiatrist about the suicide attempt. Although the plan in this event was to take him to A&E, the psychiatrist decided to instead have him attend a previously planned counselling session that afternoon. During the counselling session, he voiced suicidal intent. Staff instructed his family to take him to A&E, but he refused and departed around 4pm. Hours later, he died after falling from a footbridge onto railway lines before being hit by a train in Sheerness.

== Inquest ==
The inquest into Murphy-Richards' death, held from May to June 2021, concluded with a verdict of suicide. It examined care provided by NELFT's CAMHS service and identified multiple shortcomings, such as inadequate safety planning despite Murphy-Richards' prior suicide attempts, absence of contingencies for non-compliance, deviation from protocols by a psychiatrist without risk reassessment, and undue reliance on family oversight without support. In July 2021, the coroner issued a Prevention of future deaths report to NELFT, citing ongoing risks to similar patients. Murphy-Richards' mother criticised NELFT's response to the report as inadequate and claimed that his use of TikTok may have played a role in causing his death.

== See also ==
- Alice Litman
- Jason Pulman
- Cass Review
