= Jason Pulman =

English transgender boy (died 2022)

- Born: Eastbourne, East Sussex, England
- Died: 19 April 2022; Hampden Park, Eastbourne, East Sussex, England

Jason Pulman was an English transgender boy from East Sussex who died by suicide at the age of 15. The inquest into his death found that systemic failures by multiple organisations involved in his care, including the police, potentially contributed to his death. His death led to media attention, an inquest, a prevention of future deaths report, and legal action against Sussex Police in the High Court.

== Background ==
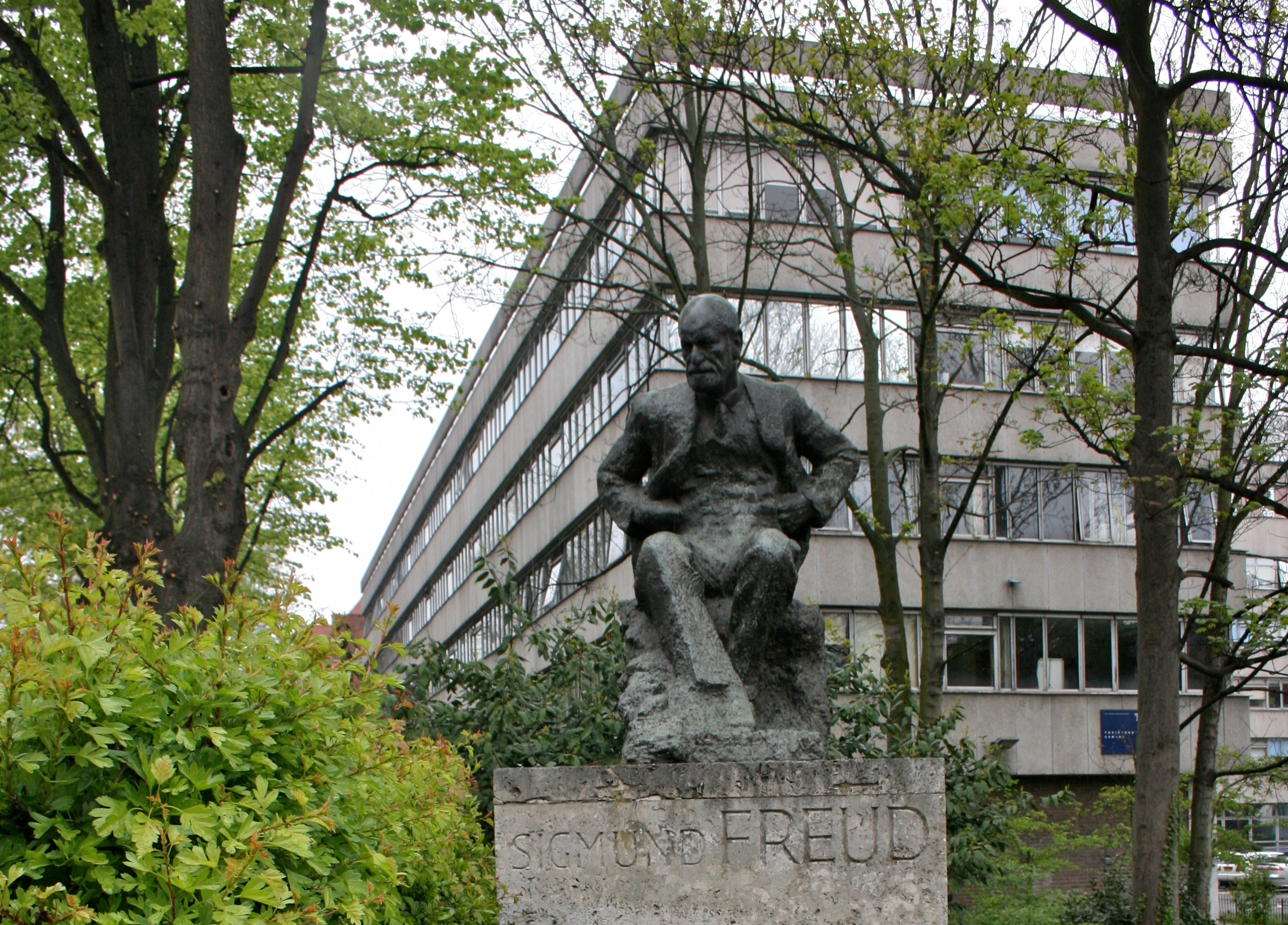
A statue of Sigmund Freud in front of the Tavistock Centre, at which the GIDS was based.

Pulman was the eldest of five siblings, was described as a talented artist, and was known to social services throughout his life. He had a complex history of psychological trauma, mental illness, serious self-harm, and substance misuse, including a previous overdose. Pulman was a student at Bexhill College in Bexhill-on-Sea, East Sussex.

=== Mental health and gender identity care ===
In February 2020, Pulman was referred to the Gender Identity Development Service (GIDS) by his general practitioner. He was later re-referred to GIDS by Child and Adolescent Mental Health Services (CAMHS) in March 2021. At the time of his death, he had been on the waiting list for gender-affirming healthcare for 26 months, having not received his first appointment in that time.

Pulman received support from CAMHS on an intermittent basis. In the month after suffering an overdose in late September 2021, he was discharged by CAMHS for the final time. The inquest into his death later heard that a multidisciplinary team meeting had considered his care before this discharge, but the documentation was inadequate.

== Death ==
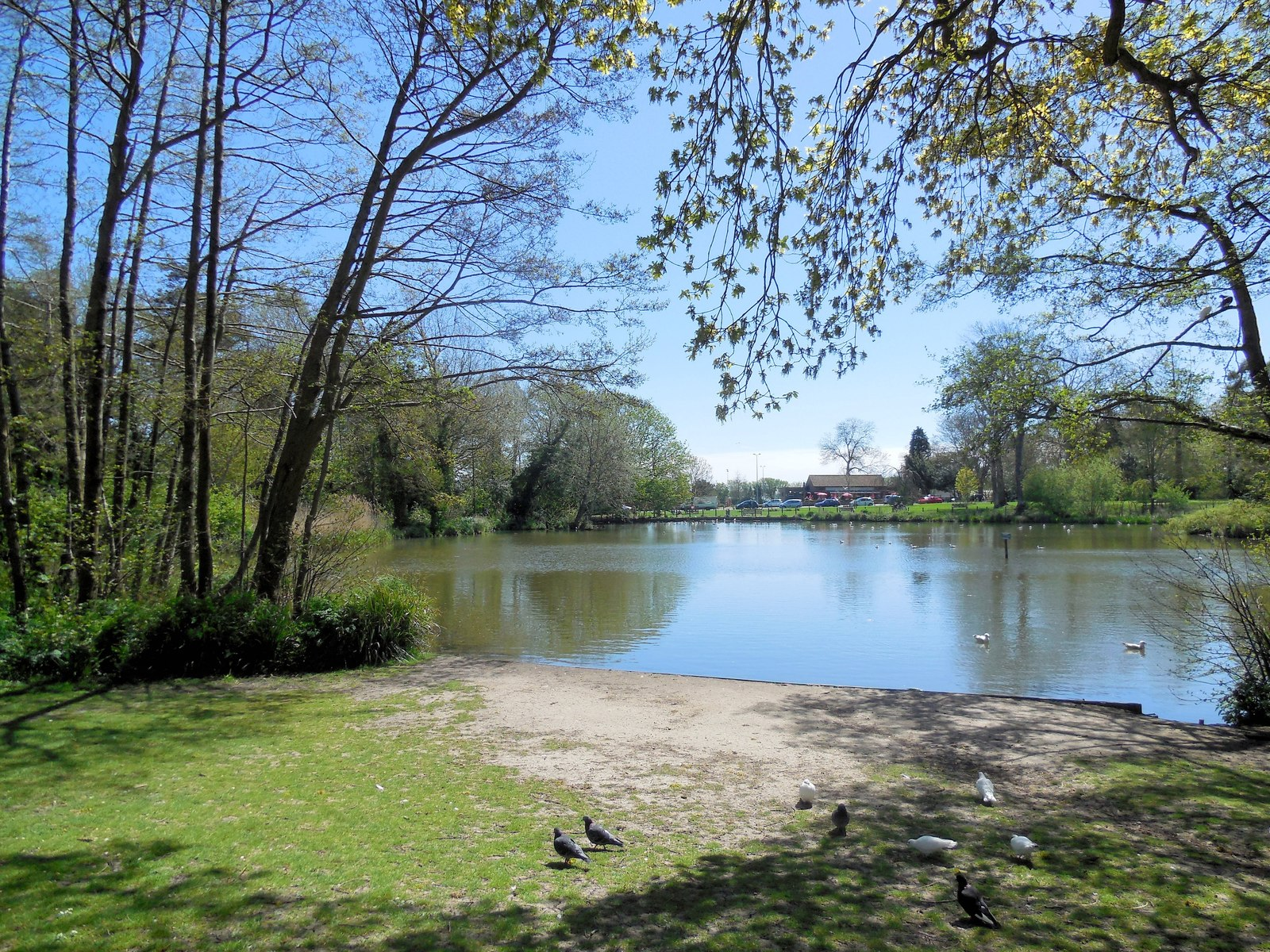
Decoy Pond inside Hampden Park, Eastbourne

On the morning of 19 April 2022, Pulman's family discovered his room was empty and reported him missing to Sussex Police. Over the course of the day, his family called the police five times, providing updates and expressing their belief that he intended to harm himself. The police initially classified the case as a "medium risk" missing person report, and an officer did not attend the family home until 7:30 pm.

The inquest found that the information provided in the initial 999 call was not properly transcribed by the call handler, and this inaccurate summary was subsequently relied upon by other officers. A duty sergeant on the late shift would have sent an alert to the British Transport Police had they properly reviewed the case, which was only done at 6:30 pm. Pulman was found by a member of the public in Hampden Park, Eastbourne at around 8:35 pm, having died by suicide by hanging. After Pulman's death, a vigil was held in his memory, proceeding from Hastings Pier along the seafront. His dad praised the attendees, saying the vigil "went extremely well" and had a "huge turnout".

== Inquest ==
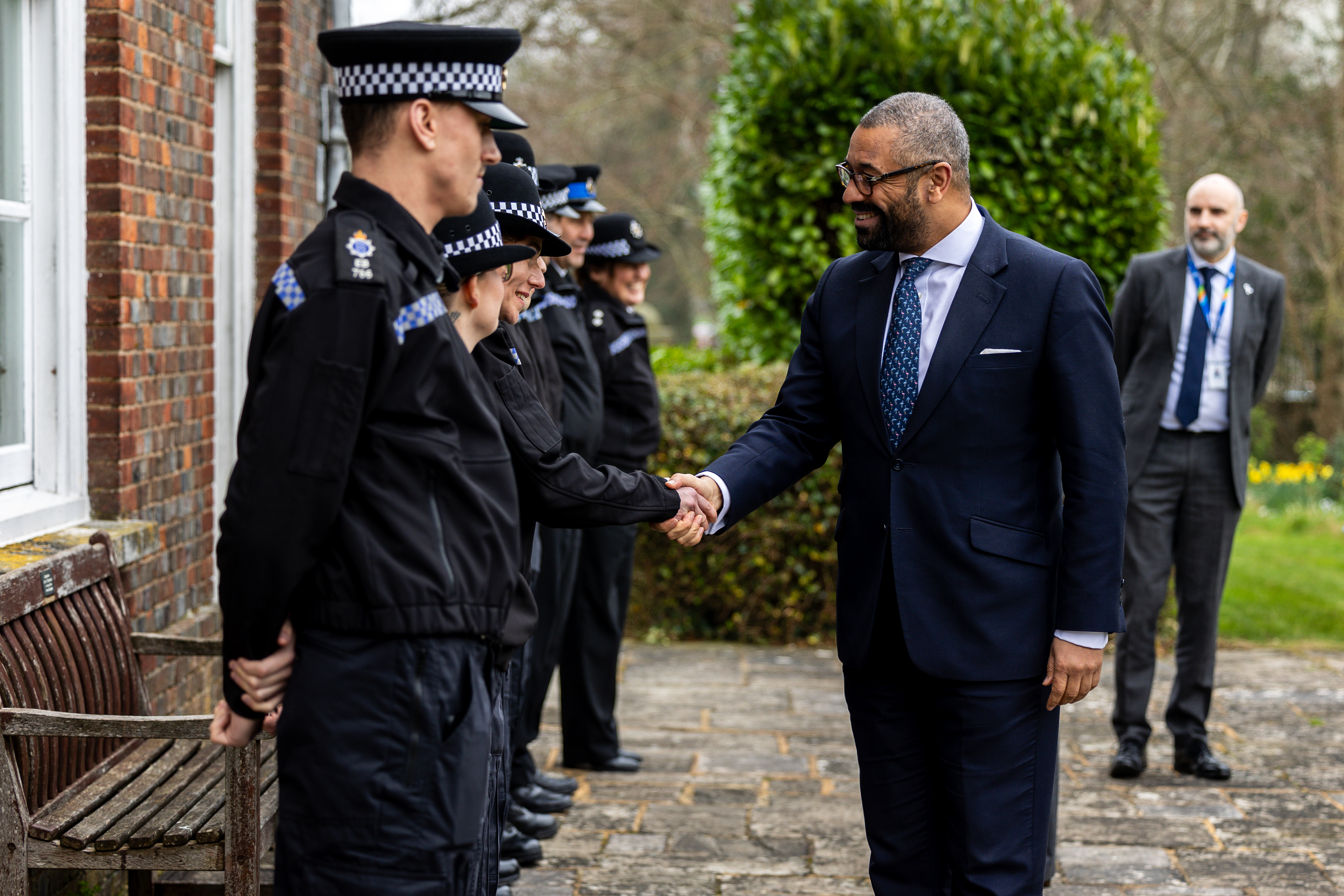
Home Secretary James Cleverly visiting Sussex Police headquarters in 2024

An inquest into Pulman's death was held at Hastings Coroner's Court from 8 to 12 April 2024. The jury concluded that Pulman died by suicide, with gender dysphoria identified as a contributing cause. They found that his emotional and mental health needs were inadequately assessed and that systemic failures by all organisations involved in his care, except for his college, may have been contributing factors in his death. Following the inquest, the Sussex Partnership NHS Foundation Trust and Sussex Police both issued apologies and accepted the findings.

=== Prevention of Future Deaths report ===
Following the inquest, a prevention of future deaths report was issued to NHS England and other services by the coroner. The report highlighted concerns about the long waiting times for the GIDS and a lack of clarity and resources for mental health services to support children and adolescents with gender dysphoria. It stressed that without urgent action, the circumstances leading to Pulman's death could be repeated.

== Legal case against Sussex Police ==
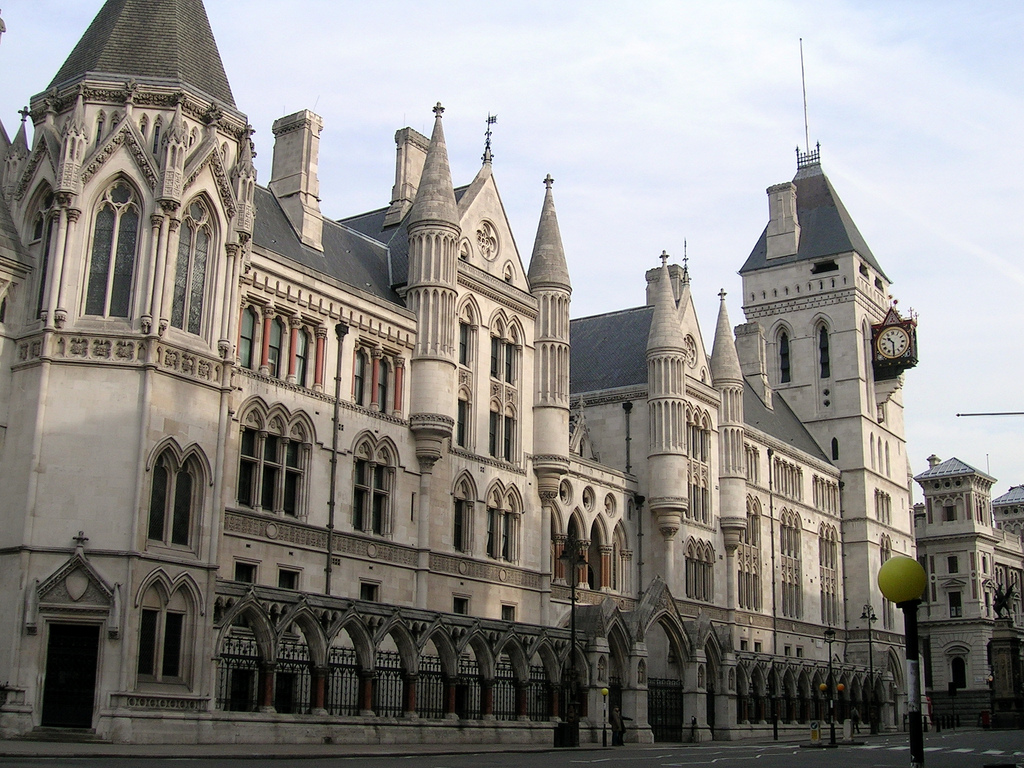
The Royal Courts of Justice, the location of the High Court

In April 2025, Pulman's mother and stepfather launched legal action against Sussex Police in the High Court, alleging a breach of Pulman's human rights. The claim, brought forward by the law firm Bindmans LLP, is in response to the police's handling of Pulman's disappearance before his death. The family contends that the force's delayed and inadequate response contributed to the 15-year-old's death by suicide. They say that, despite being notified of Jason's vulnerabilities, a police officer did not attend their home for nearly 10 hours. The family say they are seeking to ensure accountability and change within the police force, which has offered condolences but declined to comment on the ongoing legal proceedings.

== See also ==
- Alice Litman
- Charlie Millers
- Cass Review
- Murphy-Richards
- Prevention of future deaths report
