= Sentencing in England and Wales =

Aspect of the legal system

Sentencing in England and Wales refers to a bench of magistrates or district judge in a magistrate's court or a judge in the Crown Court passing sentence on a person found guilty of a criminal offence. In deciding the sentence, the court will take into account a number of factors: the type of offence and how serious it is, the timing of any plea of guilty, the defendant's character and antecedents, including their criminal record and the defendant's personal circumstances such as their financial circumstances in the case of a fine being imposed.

In England and Wales, the types of sentence that may be imposed for a particular offence are specified by statute. There are four main types of sentence: discharges, fines, community sentences and custodial (or prison) sentences. If a court convicts a defendant but decides not to impose any punishment, they are discharged conditionally or absolutely. Discharges may be ordered for any offence where the penalty is not fixed by law, although in practice they are used in the least serious offences. Fines are the most common sentence.

For offences considered to be "serious enough", a range of community sentences is available to the court. Community sentences place 'requirements' on the offender - things they must do, or not do, in the community. Requirements can include: doing unpaid work, getting treatment for an addiction (for example drugs), or preventing a defendant from going to a specific place or area. For those offences considered so serious that a non-custodial sentence cannot be justified, a prison sentence may be imposed, either immediate or suspended. The maximum prison sentence in the magistrates' court is six months (which may be imposed consecutively up to 12 months for two triable either-way offences). There is also a range of ancillary sentences available to the courts, such as compensation orders, costs, restraining orders and disqualification orders, depending on the type of offence.

For the most serious offences such as murder, the sentence is fixed as life. Some offences carry minimum sentences, for example, certain firearms offences, "three strikes and you're out" burglaries, using someone to mind a weapon, or those committed by dangerous offenders. There are different sentencing provisions for offenders aged ten to seventeen years old, and some modified provisions for those in the 18-20 age range.

== Role of the courts ==
If a person pleads guilty, or is found guilty of an offence after a trial, the court is required to decide what sentence should be imposed on the offender. Magistrates and judges have a wide range of sentences available to them, however they are subject to certain restrictions. Magistrates' powers are restricted to a maximum custodial sentence of six months for one offence or 12 months for two triable either-way offences (i.e. those offences that can be heard at either the magistrates' court or the Crown Court). The maximum fine the magistrates' court can impose is £5,000. The Secretary of State for Justice has the power to vary the maximum penalties the magistrates' court can impose—this power was utilised between 2 May 2022 and 30 March 2023 to raise the limit on imprisonment for 12 months for a single triable either-way offence.

Judges in the Crown Court can impose life sentences and there is no upper limit on the fine that may be imposed for particular offences.

The type and maximum level of sentence for each offence is fixed by Parliament in statutes known as Acts of Parliament. For example, the crime of theft has a fixed maximum of seven years imprisonment. Some offences have a maximum of life imprisonment: these include manslaughter and rape. In such cases, the judge has complete discretion when sentencing: the offender may be sent to prison or receive a shorter term, or a non-custodial sentence may passed. The only exception is murder which carries a mandatory life sentence.

== Sentencing Act 2020 ==
The main statute on sentencing is the Sentencing Act 2020, which consolidated previous sentencing laws into one single Sentencing Code following a Law Commission report led by David Ormerod.

The Act sets out a number of factors that the court must take into account when passing sentence, the weight to be attached to each factor in a case is a matter for the sentencer. By specifying maximum sentences for particular offences, Parliament indicates its view of the seriousness of the offence. The Sentencing Council helps to refine this process by providing guidance, including sentencing guidelines which suggests a sentencing level in each case. The sentencer is required to consider the guidelines and, if they decide to impose a different type of sentence, to give their reasons for doing so.

=== Aims of sentencing ===
Section 57 of the Sentencing Act (previously s147 of the Criminal Justice Act 2003) sets out five purposes of sentencing, to which any court dealing with an offender must have regard:

- the punishment of offenders
- the reduction of crime (including its reduction by deterrence)
- the reform and rehabilitation of offenders
- the protection of the public
- the making of reparation by offenders to persons affected by their offences

This is not intended to be a hierarchical order. The Sentencing Council has stated that the statutory aims set out in statute does "not indicate that any one purpose should be treated as more or less important than another. In an individual case, any or all of the purposes may be relevant to a certain degree and it will be for the judge or magistrate to decide how they apply". The Lord Chief Justice has said, “It is no purpose of sentencing to exact vengeance on an offender.”

These considerations do not apply to fixed sentences, minimum sentences or certain orders imposed under the Mental Health Act 1983.

The Sentencing Act 2026 amends the aims of sentencing aims, specifically to add "(including victims of crime)" to "the protection of the public". The Explanatory Notes for the Bill state this is to "ensure that the protection of victims is specifically considered when courts determine the appropriate sentence".

== The sentencing process ==
The court is required to make two principal decisions: the type of sentence and its length (or, in the case of a fine, the amount). The court will first consider the following factors:

=== The seriousness of the offence ===
To determine the sentence under the relevant sentencing guidelines, the court will consider details of each offence in order to assess its seriousness. This involves assessing the aggravating and mitigating features of the offence. Courts can take into account any fact considered relevant as aggravating or mitigating, and many are set out in sentencing guidelines.

The Sentencing Act sets out a number of statutory aggravating factors including:

- whether the offence was committed on bail for other offences
- previous convictions
- the conviction being connected to terrorism (or on behalf of a foreign power)
- the victim being an emergency service worker or provider of a public service
- the defendant used a minor to look after, transport or hide a weapon used in the offence.
- the defendant was in the vicinity of a school when supplying controlled drugs or psychoactive substances under the Psychoactive Substances Act 2016

The Sentencing Act also provides a statutory mitigating factor to reduce the sentence when a defendant pleads guilty or provides assistance to the prosecution.

This information may reveal underlying issues, such as a drug problem. In motoring cases, previous endorsements on the driving record can have consequences, such as a period of disqualification under the "totting-up" rules.

=== The defendant’s circumstances ===
The court will need to consider the defendant's character, previous convictions (most relevant will be those for similar offences) and any personal mitigation, as expressed by the defendant's advocate or (if unrepresented) by the defendant in person. An early guilty plea will go towards reducing the sentence—this can result in a discount in up to a third of the sentence, depending when the plea is entered.

Other relevant personal circumstances may be considered. Their financial circumstances will be highly relevant when a fine, costs or compensation is considered because the court has a duty under section 124 of the Sentencing Act to take these into account when fixing the overall amount.

=== Pre-sentence reports ===
In the event of the court considering either a community or a custodial sentence, the court can order that a pre-sentence report is prepared to assist with sentencing. Pre-sentence reports provide the court with additional information about the defendant and their circumstances, the risk of re-offending and any personal issues likely to affect the sentencing, e.g. a drug addiction. A psychiatric report may be ordered in appropriate cases. Short reports can be prepared on the day, otherwise the usual time for obtaining a pre-sentence report is three weeks.

The Sentencing Council made recommendations in 2025 that judges ought to order pre-sentence reports for offenders from a variety of backgrounds (including ethnic/cultural/religious minorities, women and those with caring responsibilities). Significant criticism followed from this, claiming that this amounted to "two-tier" justice. The government passed the Sentencing Guidelines (Pre-sentence Reports) Act 2025 to forbid the Sentencing Council from making reference to "personal characteristics" (including but not limited to race, religion and cultural background) in formulating the rules on when to order a pre-sentence report.

=== Passing sentence ===
After taking into account all the relevant information, and fixing the sentence accordingly, the court will announce the sentence in open court, addressing the defendant directly and giving reasons for the decisions. Since 2022, sentencing remarks in some Crown Court trials have been broadcast or published in video form. Ancillary orders such as costs and disqualification will also be announced at this time.

=== Appeals ===
If a court makes a mistake regarding sentencing, it is possible to correct these through the operation of the "slip rule". In the magistrates' court, this is contained in section 142 of the Magistrates' Courts Act 1980; the equivalent power in the Crown Court is section 385 of the Sentencing Act 2020, and can only be exercised within 56 days of sentencing, and must be done by the same judge who passed sentence.

There is a right to appeal from a magistrates' court to the Crown Court, exercisable within 21 days. If a defendant pleaded not guilty, they can appeal against conviction or sentence; if they pleaded guilty, they can only appeal against sentence. This is the normal route for appeals against sentence, but it is also possible to appeal sentence by way of case stated or (in somewhat exceptional circumstances) judicial review.

Following a Crown Court trial, the only route for a defendant to appeal a sentence is to the Court of Appeal under section 9 of the Criminal Appeal Act 1968.

Defendants who have received custodial sentences following a trial may apply for bail while an appeal is pending, but the decision to grant bail is entirely within the discretion of the court.

The Criminal Justice Act 1988 introduced a process for referring sentences that are unduly lenient for review by the Court of Appeal. The Attorney General or Solicitor General can refer such cases, and the Court of Appeal can change a sentence if it determines that the original sentence "falls outside the range of sentences which the judge, applying his mind to all the relevant factors, could reasonably consider appropriate". A request to do so can be made by any member of the public, as well as by the CPS, but the application to the Court of Appeal must be made within 28 days of the sentencing. The scheme is limited to only certain specified offences. The House of Commons Library states that the success rate for unduly lenient sentence appeals are "around 60-80%".

== Sentencing guidelines ==
=== Background ===
The sentencing guidelines issued by the Sentencing Council are at the heart of the courts' decision-making in sentencing. The development of these guidelines has been incremental, with the Magistrates' Association issuing their own guidelines and the Court of Appeal issuing guideline judgments in particular cases. Following the Crime and Disorder Act 1998, a Sentencing Advisory Panel was established to assist the courts in issuing sentencing guidelines. In 2003, this was supplemented by the Sentencing Guidelines Council comprising a majority of judicial members, which is now known as the Sentencing Council.

=== Sentencing Council ===
Created by the Coroners and Justice Act 2009, the Sentencing Council is an independent body which promotes consistent approaches to sentencing by issuing guidelines, analysing the impact of those guidelines on sentencing practice and to improve the confidence of the public by publishing information and promoting awareness of sentencing. The council produces an annual report.

== Powers of the courts ==
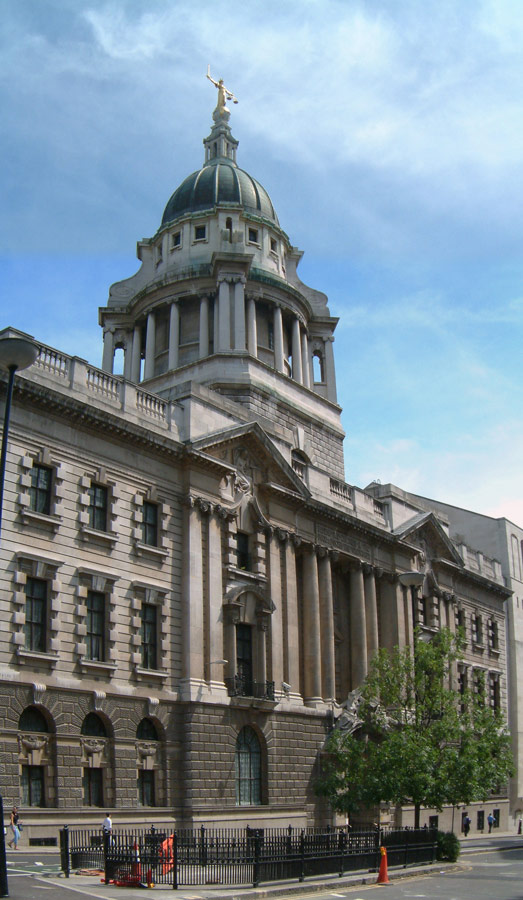
The Old Bailey or Central Criminal Court in London.

The courts have a number of different types of sentences available to them. In descending order of severity, these are: custodial sentences, community sentences, fines and discharges. The courts can also make ancillary orders such as costs, compensation orders, and driving disqualifications for road traffic offences.

=== Custodial sentences for adults (18 years and over) ===
Custodial sentences range from a minimum of five days to life imprisonment. They include:

- mandatory and discretionary life sentences
- fixed-term sentences
- suspended sentences

Section 230 of the Sentencing Act 2020 states that the court must not pass a custodial sentence unless it is of the opinion that the offence (or combination of offences): "was so serious that neither a fine alone nor a community sentence can be justified". The court must always state the reason for imposing a custodial sentence.

Other preconditions of a custodial sentence are that a pre-sentence report has been obtained (in most cases), and the defendant is legally represented or has been offered the opportunity to be represented and has refused.

For offenders aged between 18 and 20 years, the sentence is served in a Young Offenders Institution (YOI). For those aged 21 years and over, the sentence is served in a prison.

Intermittent custody—equivalent to intermittent confinement as used in the United States—was included in the Criminal Justice Act 2003 following the recommendations of the 2001 review of sentencing by John Halliday, but was never implemented and formally repealed by the Legal Aid, Sentencing and Punishment of Offenders Act 2012.

=== Mandatory life sentences ===
Although murder carries a mandatory life sentence, it rarely means that the offender will spend the rest of their natural life in prison. A "minimum term" is usually set by the judge to indicate the period the offender must serve in custody before being released on licence. The relevant provisions are contained in Schedule 21 of the Sentencing Act 2020. It gives judges a starting point for the minimum period to be considered, ranging from a 12 years to a whole life order. The circumstances in which a whole life order should be imposed on an offender aged 21 years or over at the time of the offence are described in Schedule 21 as follows:

- the murder of two or more persons, where each murder involves a substantial degree of premeditation or planning or the abduction of the victim or sexual or sadistic conduct;
- the murder of a child if involving a substantial degree of premeditation or planning or the abduction of the child or sexual or sadistic motivation;
- a murder done for the purpose of advancing a political, religious, racial or ideological cause;
- a murder by an offender previously convicted of murder;
- a murder of a police or prison officer in the course of his or her duty;

The Court of Appeal has noted that whole life orders are "a sentence of last resort for cases of the most extreme gravity", and cases where it is to be applied "must be exceptionally serious, even in the context of murder". The imposition of whole life orders has been held to be compatible with Article 3 of the European Convention on Human Rights.

Another starting point is 30 years, which applies to offenders aged 18 years and over at the time of the offence in respect of offences involving:

- murder involving the use of a firearm or explosive;
- murder for gain (e.g. a contract killing or murder during the course of a burglary);
- killing intended to obstruct the course of justice (e.g. murder of a witness);
- murder involving sexual or sadistic conduct;
- the murder of two or more persons (other than those for which a whole life starting point is appropriate);
- murder motivated by race, religion or sexual orientation; and
- a murder within the category of cases that would otherwise attract a whole life starting point committed by an offender aged under 21 at the time of the offence.

The starting point for a murder committed with a knife is a minimum of 25 years. This starting point was introduced following the murder of Ben Kinsella.

The next starting point is 15 years, which applies to any other murder committed by a person aged 18 years or over at the time of the offence. For offenders aged 17 years or under at the time of the offence, the Schedule sets a variety of starting points depending on age and severity.

Upon determining the appropriate starting point for the minimum term, the court will consider the aggravating or mitigating factors of the offence and may increase or decrease the term in order to arrive at the appropriate minimum term.

Aggravating factors may include: a significant degree of planning or premeditation, the victim being particularly vulnerable due to age or disability, mental or physical suffering inflicted on the victim before death, the accused's abuse of a position of trust, the use of duress or threats against another person to facilitate the commission of the offence, the victim providing a public service or performing a public duty, or concealment, destruction or dismemberment of the body. Mitigating factors may include: intention to cause serious bodily harm rather than to kill, lack of premeditation, the offender suffering a mental disorder or disability which lowered his degree of culpability, provocation (not amounting to loss of control or the previous provocation defence), any element of self-defence, a belief by the offender that the murder was an act of mercy, and the age of the offender.

The Police, Crime, Sentencing and Courts Act 2022 expanded mandatory life sentences to include manslaughter of emergency workers, except in "exceptional circumstances". This change was introduced following the killing of Andrew Harper.

A sentence of life imprisonment is available to the court for offenders over the age of 18 who are convicted of a second serious sexual or violent offence. In exceptional circumstances, the judge has a discretion not to impose a life sentence.

In 2023, the government introduced a Bill in the Commons that intended to make whole life orders mandatory for murders in more circumstances, including murders "involving sexual or sadistic conduct". Under these proposals, judges would need to find "exceptional circumstances" in such cases to not impose a whole life order.

=== Discretionary life sentences ===
Life imprisonment is available to judges as a discretionary sentence for a number of serious offences.

=== Home detention curfew ===
Offenders may be released from prison on the condition that a curfew condition is imposed, which is enforced by electronic tagging. Originally introduced in 1999 in the Crime and Disorder Act 1998, the relevant provisions are contained in the Criminal Justice Act 2003. Under these rules, an offender may be released before the normal point at which they would be released (usually at the halfway point during their sentence).

There is no automatic right to a home detention curfew—unlike automatic release on licence, it is a discretionary power. A number of categories of offending (particularly sexual offences) are automatically excluded by statute, and offenders must pass a risk assessment before being granted release under these provisions. The maximum amount of time which can be spent under home detention curfew is 180 days, and the minimum is two weeks. If a home detention curfew is not granted, an offender must serve half their sentence before being automatically released. Once granted, an offender can be recalled for breach of the curfew condition, breach of other conditions, or if they pose a threat to public safety. Home detention curfew orders were introduced to aid prisoners structure their lives and help to reduce recidivism rates.

=== Extended sentences ===
Sections 224 and 227 of the Criminal Justice Act 2003 require the court to pass an extended sentence of imprisonment (if the offender was aged 21 or over on conviction) or an extended sentence of detention in a young offender institution (if he was aged 18, 19 or 20 on conviction) in the following circumstances:

1. The offence must be:
  a) one of the violent or sexual offences specified in Schedule 15; and
  b) punishable by a determinate sentence of less than 10 years.
2. There must be a significant risk to the public of serious harm (i.e. death or serious personal injury) caused by the offender's committing further Schedule 15 offences.

The 'purposes of sentencing' provisions of section 142 of the Act and the requirement that the offence(s) must be so serious that neither a fine alone nor a community sentence can be justified do not apply.

"Serious harm" means death or serious personal injury, whether physical or psychological: S. 224 (3) CJA 2003. See R v Lang and others [2005] (The Times, 10 November) where the Court of Appeal indicated that previous case law would still be considered relevant guidance in assessing this issue.

=== Minimum sentences ===
These are the so-called "three strikes and you're out" provisions. There is a mandatory minimum sentence of seven years for an adult who is convicted on three separate occasion of dealing in Class A drugs - section 110 Power of Criminal Courts (Sentencing) Act 2000. Likewise, there is a minimum mandatory sentence of three years for anyone convicted of burglary of a dwelling for the third time - section 111 of the same Act. For each sentence, court has discretion not to impose the minimum term if it considers it would be unjust having regard to the particular circumstances of the offence(s) or the offender. The court must state the particular circumstances when passing sentence.

=== Suspended prison sentences ===
The court has power to impose a suspended sentence of imprisonment (or detention, for youth offenders) of up to two years. To impose a suspended sentence, the court must be satisfied that the offence passes the custody threshold—it is serious enough "that neither a fine alone nor a community sentence can be justified for the offence". The features of this sentence are:

- the minimum term of imprisonment to be suspended must be 14 days (or 21 days for youth offenders)
- the maximum term is six months (or 24 months in the Crown Court)
- the court can order the offender to undertake requirements
- the sentence can be coupled with a fine
- a supervision period can be imposed of not less than 6 months and no longer than the suspended period of the sentence or two years, whichever is the shorter
- the order may be periodically reviewed and
- the sentence will be activated if the offender fails to comply with any requirement or commits any further offence(s) during the operational period, unless there are exceptional circumstances

It is at the court's discretion to fix the period of suspension (known as the operational period), which can be for any period up to two years. If during this time, the offender does not commit any further offences, the prison sentence will not be implemented. However, in the event that the offender does re-offend during the operational period, then the sentence is 'activated' and the offender will serve the suspended sentence along with any sentence given for the new offence. A suspended sentence is usually implemented to run consecutively to a term of imprisonment imposed for the new offence.

== Community orders ==
The Sentencing Act allows courts to issue a community order for offenders aged 18 years or over. An equivalent system of referral orders and Youth Rehabilitation Orders exist for young offenders. A community order can contain a number of different requirements which can be tailored to fit the offender's needs as well as punishing him/her for the offence. The available requirements are set out in Schedule 9 of the Sentencing Act.

In addition to specific requirements, there is a general duty on offenders to remain in contact with their probation officer throughout the order, as well as to obtain permission from either the officer or the court before changing address.

=== Unpaid work requirements ===
An unpaid requirement requires an offender to work between 40 and 300 hours on a suitable project organised by the probation service. The exact number of hours will be specified by the court and are usually worked in 8-hour shifts at weekends. The type of work will vary depending on locality and the probation service operating the scheme. For example, offenders may be required to clean or tidy up public areas (or gardens of elderly or disabled people), paint or decorate public buildings or community facilities, or work in charity shops. Eric Cantona, the French footballer, was ordered to help coach youth footballing sessions when he was convicted for assaulting a fan.

=== Prohibited activity requirement ===
The notion behind prohibited activity orders is to prevent the offender from committing further offences of the same type they have just been convicted of. Often an offender is prohibited from going into a certain area where he or she has caused trouble. In some cases offenders have been banned from wearing particular garments such as a 'hoodie'. In 2006, a defendant who was found guilty of criminal damage was banned from carrying paint, marker pens or dye ink.

=== Curfew requirement ===
A curfew requirement can require that an offender will be at a fixed address for between 2–12 hours during a 24-hour period for up to six months. The order can be enforced with electronic tagging. These orders can only be issued if there is monitoring system for curfew in their area. Monitoring can be done via spot-check, with private security firm sending employees to check on an offender at home or but more commonly by electronic tagging. The cost of tagging is estimated to be £675 per month per offender. This compares favourably with keeping an offender in prison which is estimated at £1,555 per offender per month.

A 2007 report showed that 58 per cent of offenders broke the terms of their tagging order and more than a quarter committed further offences.

In uncontroversial cases, curfew requirements can be changed by the responsible officer without needing to go to court. Defendants can also appeal to modify the curfew requirements.

=== Exclusion requirement ===
An exclusion requirement prohibits an offender from going to certain place. They are designed to prevent re-offending by keeping an offender away from the place where they are likely to commit offences. The requirement can specify different places on different days. It can be imposed for up to two years in respect of offenders aged 16 years and over, or a maximum of three months for those under the age of 16. For example, a repeat shoplifter could be banned from going to a particular shopping center.

=== Other requirements ===
In addition to the other requirements set out above, it is possible for community sentences to include:

- a requirement to attend rehabilitation activities, which may include elements of reparative or restorative justice
- a requirement to participate in accredited programmes (specifically designed for particular types of offending including domestic violence or sexual offences, or to help with substance misuse or anger management)
- residence requirements
- prohibition on foreign travel, on specific days, to specified countries (this has been described as punitive and not widely used)
- a requirement to submit to mental health treatment
- a requirement to undergo drug rehabilitation, or drug testing — formerly known as a Drug Treatment and Testing Order (DTTO)
- a requirement to undergo alcohol treatment, or alcohol abstinence and monitoring
- electronic compliance and/or whereabouts monitoring

Formerly, a community order could include the requirement to turn up to an attendance centre. This only applied for offenders aged under 25, and has been abolished by the Police, Crime, Sentencing and Courts Act 2022 for offences after 28 June 2022.

== Fines ==
In the Magistrates Court, the most common disposal is a fine. There is a 'standard scale' of fines which is now contained in section 122 of the Sentencing Act 2020. Lower limits apply to young offenders.

Level 1	£200
Level 2	£500
Level 3	£1,000
Level 4	£2,500
Level 5	£5,000

The standard scale of fines used to be the maximum permissible amount the magistrates' court could fine an offender, but section 85 of the Legal Aid, Sentencing and Punishment of Offenders Act 2012 allows for the Magistrates Court to levy fines greater than the level 5 maximum.

Magistrates can also fine up to £20,000 for offences under certain regulations, such as a breach of health and safety in the workplace. In the Crown Court, the fines can be limitless.

The court will enquire into the financial circumstances of the offender and fix the fine at the level reflecting seriousness of the offence, taking account of the circumstances of the case and the means to pay.

Payment of fines—as well as other orders for payment—is enforced by the magistrates' court. All fines are due for payment immediately, but the court has the power to dispense with immediate payment and make orders for further time or payment by installments. If a fine is not paid, the court can issue a variety of other orders to enforce the order, including imprisonment (or detention for 18-21 year olds).

== Discharges ==
Discharges may either be conditional or absolute.

A conditional discharge is where the court discharges an offender on the condition that no further offences are committed during a specified period up to a maximum of three years. They are used when it is deemed that a punitive sentence is unnecessary. If the offender re-offends during the conditional discharge period, the court can re-sentence for the original offence as well as passing sentence for the latest offence(s).

An absolute discharge means that, in effect, no penalty is imposed. Such a sentence is likely to be ordered where an offender has technically committed an offence but is morally blameless for it. They are usually reserved for the most minor offences but can, exceptionally, be ordered in serious cases (e.g. the signalman in the 1892 Thirsk rail crash).

In both cases, the court may still make ancillary orders such as compensation, costs, disqualification (from driving, being a company director, operating licensed premises etc.) or a football banning order. Neither type of discharge can be given when the court is required to make a mandatory sentence under section 399 of the Sentencing Act.

== Deferred sentences ==
If a court believes that an offender's circumstances are about to change or an offender's conduct after conviction (including reparation for the offence) may give rise to a different sentencing decision, the court may defer sentencing once for a fixed period of up to twelve months. When the period of the deferment order expires, the offender must return to the court on the day specified. This power was first introduced by the Criminal Justice Act 1972.

A sentence will only normally be deferred where the change in circumstances is such that the punishment will not be necessary, or a lesser penalty will be imposed if the offender complies with the terms of the deferred sentence. The offender must consent to the deferment.

Deferment orders can contain requirements. These can include participation in a restorative justice processes (with the agreement of both the offender and all involved participants), residence at a particular location during the period of the order, or treatment for alcohol or drug use. A supervisor (which may include a probation officer) may be appointed to ensure compliance with the requirements. Failure to abide by the requirements can lead to the offender being returned to court and sentenced. If the offender is charged and convicted with another offence during the deferment period, either the original court or the court handling the latter offence may sentence the offender for the offence covered by the deferment order.

The Court of Appeal has stated that deferred sentencing should only be used "in a small group of cases, at either the custody threshold or the community sentence threshold, where the court may be prepared to impose a lesser sentence provided the defendant is prepared to adapt his behaviour in a way clearly specified by the court". The Sentencing Council notes they are only for use in "very limited circumstances". There is also only very limited academic study on the use and effects of such sentences.

Prosectors can refer a deferred sentence to the Court of Appeal on the basis of it being unduly lenient. Defendants can also appeal deferment orders.

The Sentencing Act 2026 increased the period of deferment from six months to twelve months. This implements the recommendations of the Independent Sentencing Review by David Gauke.

== Alternative sentences ==
England and Wales is facing an overcrowding crisis in the prisons. The Sentencing Act 2026 has introduced a variety of alternative sentencing options for less serious offenders. Once the powers come into force, judges will be able impose restrictions such as bans from pubs, football matches, concerts, and other venues, along with travel and driving bans, exclusion zones, and mandatory drug testing. Justice Secretary Shabana Mahmood stated this would ensure offenders can face meaningful consequences by curbing their freedoms outside prison.

== Ancillary powers of the courts ==
The courts can make orders which are ancillary to the main sentence. They are aimed at compensating victims of offences and/or ensuring that an offender does not benefit from their offences.

=== Compensation and restitution orders ===
The courts can make an order that the offender pay a sum of money to his victim in compensation. There is a presumption that the court will make an order in an appropriate case since reasons must be given if no order is made. There is now no upper limit on the maximum compensation that can be imposed in the Magistrates' Court (except for juveniles, where it is £5,000 per offence). Compensation orders must only be made when there is a clear evidence of loss based on a summary enquiry by the court.

In the event that the offender still has possession of stolen property the court will make a restitution order for the return of the goods to the victim.

=== Disqualification from driving ===
Where an offender who is charged and convicted with a driving offence, the courts have the power to disqualify the offender from driving for a certain length of time, which will depend on the type and severity of the offence. There is a mandatory minimum 12 months for drink-driving offences. For previous drink-driving convictions within the preceding ten years, the minimum period of disqualification is three years. The courts also have the power to disqualify offenders for any offence where a vehicle was used in the commission of the offence, for example using a car to commit burglaries in rural areas.

=== Deprivation and forfeiture orders ===
The court can order an offender to be deprived of property he has used to commit an offence. A person convicted of a drink-driving offence can be deprived of their vehicle. The Proceeds of Crime Act 2002 also gives courts wide-ranging powers to confiscate assets following conviction.

== Young offender sentences ==
The term "young offender" includes all offenders under the age of 21. However, those in the 18 to 21 (inclusive) age group are generally subject to the provisions of the adult court, although in the case of custody, they are sentenced detention in a young offenders' institute rather than imprisonment. There are considerable variations in the different sentences available for those under 18, under 16, under 14 and under 12. Offenders under 18 are normally dealt with in the youth court. In a case where a youth is jointly charged with an adult, they will both appear before the adult court, although that court may choose to remit the youth to the youth court for sentencing.

=== Young offenders' institutions ===
A sentence of detention in a young offenders' institution (or YOI) is available to the court in respect of those between the ages of 15 and 21 years (inclusive) who have committed imprisonable offences. The relevant provisions are contained in the Criminal Justice Act 1982, which introduced the sentence to replace borstal training. YOI's are managed by the Prison Service. The term of detention is up to the maximum allowed for adult imprisonment for the relevant offence, and the same custody threshold ("so serious") applies as in the case of the adult court. The minimum period of detention is 21 days.

=== Detention and training orders ===
This sentence was implemented by the Crime and Disorder Act 1998. for offenders aged 12 to 17 years (inclusive) who are persistent offenders or commit serious offences. The sentences will be between four months and two years, with part of the sentence being served in custody and part half under supervision the community. The term must be specified as four, six, eight, ten, twelve, eighteen or twenty-four months. The "youth offending team" (YOT) will draw up a plan of supervision which the offender is required to meet upon their release from custody - failure to do so may result in their being brought back to court and returned to detention. Supervision may be under an officer of the YOT, a probation officer or social worker.

=== Detention for serious crimes ===
In cases involving very serious offences, the courts have additional power to order that the offender be detained for longer periods. For those aged between 10 and 13, this power is only available where the crime committed carries a maximum sentence of at least 14 years for adults. For those aged between 14 and 17, it is also available for causing death by dangerous driving, or for causing death by driving under the influence by drink or drugs. The length imposed by the judge cannot exceed the maximum sentence available for an adult.

=== Detentions at His Majesty's pleasure ===
Offenders aged 10–17 who are convicted of murder must be ordered to be detained during His Majesty's pleasure. This is an indeterminate sentence which allows the offender to be released when suitable. The judge in the case can recommend a minimum number of years that should be served before release is considered, and the Lord Chief Justice will then set the tariff. If an offender reaches 22 while they are still serving the sentence they will then be transferred to an adult prison.

=== Community orders, referral orders and Youth Rehabilitation Orders ===
Community orders can only be given to young offenders aged 18 and over. The same requirements used for adults can be imposed.

Youth Rehabilitation Orders can be given to under 18s and are broadly equivalent to community orders. They were introduced by the Criminal Justice and Immigration Act 2008, replace a variety of previous youth sentencing orders including action plan orders, supervision orders, curfew orders, exclusion orders and attendance centre orders.

The other community sentencing option for under 18s is a referral order.

=== Fines ===
The maximum amount that can be fined varies with the age of the young offender. Those between 10 and 13 years can only be fined a maximum of £250. Those aged between 14 and 17 the maximum is £1,000. Those aged 18 and over are subject to the normal limits on fines.

=== Reparation orders ===
Repartition orders can be imposed on offenders under the age of 18. An order will require the offender to make reparation, as specified in the order, to a person or person who were victims of the offence, or were otherwise affected by it, or to the community at large. The order is for a maximum of 24 hours and the reparation order must be completed under supervision within three months of its imposition. An order for direct reparation to a victim can only be made with that person's consent.

=== Discharges ===
Discharges may be used for defendants of any age, and are commonly used for first-time young offenders who have committed minor crimes. The courts cannot conditionally discharge an offender in the following circumstances:

- where a child or young offender who is convicted of an offence has been warned within the previous two years, unless there are exceptional circumstance which must be explained in open court.
- where the offender is in breach of an anti social behavior order
- where the offender is in breach of a sex offender order.

=== Reprimands and warnings ===
Reprimands and warnings are not sentences passed by the court, but methods by which the police can deal with offenders without bringing a case to court. For a reprimand or warning to be given, there has to be evidence that a child or young person has committed an offence and admits it. The police must also be satisfied that it would not be in the public interest for the offender to be prosecuted in court. A reprimand or warning can only be given if the offender has never been convicted of any offence. There is no maximum limit to the number of times that an offender can be 'cautioned' by the police. The first step is the reprimand. This can only be given if the young offender has not been previously reprimanded or warned. Even then, it should not be used where the police officer considers the offence so serious that a warning would be required. Any offender can be warned only if he has not been warned before or if an earlier warning was more than two years before. The child or young offender when warned must be referred to the Youth Offending Team. The YOT will assess the case and, unless it considers it inappropriate to do so, arranges for the offender to participate in a rehabilitation scheme.

== Parental responsibility ==
If parents or guardians of a young offender agree, they can be bound over to keep their child under control for a set period of time up to one year. If the child re-offends then a maximum fine is payable of £1000. If a parent unreasonably refuses to be bound over then the court can fine that parent instead. Parents can also be bound over to ensure that a young offender complies with their community sentence order(s). Where a young offender under 16 who is fined then the court is required to take the parents financial situation into account in deciding the order.

=== Parenting orders ===
A parenting order is an order under the Crime and Disorder Act 1998. Parenting orders are intended to offer training and support to parents to aid changing their children's offending behavior. Under such an order a parent can be mandated to attend counselling or guidance sessions for up to three months on maximum basis of one session per week. Also, the parent may be required to comply with the conditions imposed by the courts; for example, taking the child to and from school and ensuring an adult supervises the child after school a court may make decide to make a parenting order where:

- the courts makes a child safety order
- the court makes an anti-social behavior order (or sex offender order) in respect of a child
- a child or young person is convicted of an offence
- a parent is convicted of an offence relating to truancy under the Education Act 1996.

Parenting orders should only be made if it is desirable in the interest of preventing the conduct which gave rise to the order. There is the presumption that parenting order will be issued to the parents of those under 16 who are committed of an offence unless it is felt as not desirable if so the court must state why.

=== Youth Offending Teams ===
The Crime and Disorder Act 1998 made mandatory requirements that each local authority in England and Wales set up one or more Youth Offending Teams (YOTs) in their respective area. The aim of their establishment is to co-ordinate and build co-operation between agencies involved in youth justice and especially the probation service and social services. YOTs are responsible for co-ordination of the prisons of the youth justice service in their area. The composition of such a team must include a probation officer, a police officer, a representative of the local health authority and a person nominated by the chief education officer. Anyone else who is deem appropriate may join the task force. The role and responsibilities of YOTs is designated under s 66 of the Crime and Disorder Act 1998, any offender who is warned must referred to the local YOT, Youth Courts also refer offender to the YOT.

== Offenders with mental disorders ==
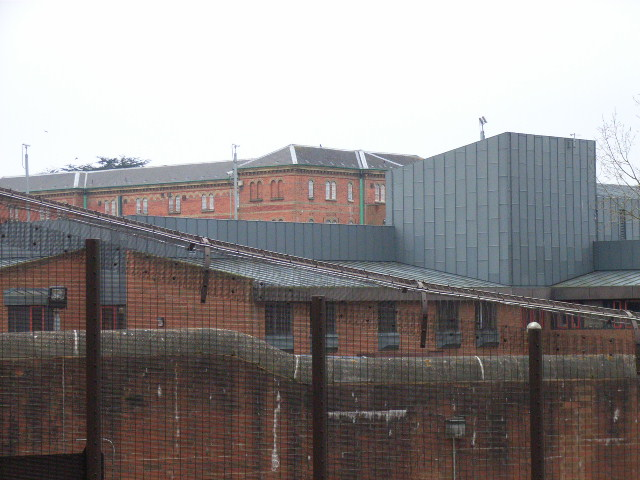
Broadmoor Hospital

A number of sentencing options are available to courts when dealing with defendants who have mental or developmental disorders, or other forms of neurological impairment. Courts must take these into account in sentencing. An offender having a mental disorder can reduce their culpability for an offence, and this may change the sentence the court imposes. The Sentencing Council produces a sentencing guideline which courts must apply when dealing with offenders with such disorders, and sentences can include a requirement for treatment.

When a court assesses that a community order is the appropriate way of disposing of a case, it may include requirements for treatment as part of the sentence, but only if the court is satisfied the condition is treatable, and that the offender is willing to comply with the order.

The sentencing court can also make orders under the Mental Health Act 1983, specifically:

- Guardianship orders (s37) — these place the offender in the care of either a local authority or a named person (usually a relative). The guardian has powers to look after the patient, by requiring them to reside at a particular location, requiring them to turn up at specified times and places (both for treatment and for work or education), and to see the patient to ensure they are cared for.
- Hospital orders (s37) — these commit the person to a hospital (usually a secure hospital such as Broadmoor Hospital) for treatment, and the doctor in charge of such treatment can discharge them once the treatment is concluded.
- Hospital and restriction orders (s41) — these are stronger than a hospital order and require the approval of the Secretary of State (or a successful application to the First-tier Tribunal) for the offender to be released. The Court of Appeal has stated that "such orders should not be passed just to mark the seriousness of the offence, but only where it is required to protect the public from serious harm". These orders can be indefinite.
- Imprisonment with a hospital and limitation direction (s45A) — this is a form of imprisonment where the sentence is served in a secure hospital. If the doctor has decided the offender has concluded treatment, they may still be held in prison (either for a determinate or indeterminate period) to satisfy the punishment element of the sentence. The Court of Appeal has stated that these orders are "particularly appropriate in two situations: the first was where, notwithstanding the existence of the mental disorder, a penal element to the sentence was appropriate; and the second was where the offender had a mental disorder but there were real doubts that he would comply with any treatment requirements in hospital, meaning that the hospital would be looking after an offender (who might be dangerous) who was not being treated".

The latter two orders can only be made by the Crown Court. A magistrates' may commit offenders to the Crown Court to make these orders.Appeals can be made against these orders: in R v Westwood, the defendant argued successfully that a sentence of imprisonment with a hospital and limitation direction was excessive. In R v Calocane (the perpetrator of the 2023 Nottingham attacks), the Court of Appeal found that the imposition of a hospital restriction order rather than imprisonment with a hospital and limitation direction was not unduly lenient.

== See also ==
- Sentencing Act 2020
- Sentencing Act 2026
- Sentencing Council
- Lurking doubt
