= Sentencing Guidelines (Pre-sentence Reports) Act 2025 =

Act of the Parliament of the United Kingdom

Sentencing Guidelines (Pre-sentence Reports) Act 2025 (Note: Section 2(3).)
- Act of Parliament
- Parliament of the United Kingdom
- Long title: An Act to make provision about sentencing guidelines in relation to pre-sentence reports.
- Citation: 2025 c. 17
- Introduced by: Shabana Mahmood MP, Secretary of State for Justice (Commons); Lord Timpson, Minister of State for Prisons, Probation and Reducing Reoffending (Lords)
- Territorial extent: England and Wales (Note: Section 2(1).)

Dates
- Royal assent: 19 June 2025
- Commencement: (Note: Section 2(2).)
Other legislation
Amends	Coroners and Justice Act 2009
Relates to	Sentencing Act 2020

Status: Current legislation

History of passage through Parliament

Text of statute as originally enacted

Revised text of statute as amended

The Sentencing Guidelines (Pre-sentence Reports) Act 2025 (c. 17) is an act of the Parliament of the United Kingdom. It forbids the Sentencing Council from using personal characteristics in making sentencing guidelines concerning pre-sentence reports.

== Background ==
The Sentencing Council makes sentencing guidelines for offenders in England and Wales. Under the Sentencing Act 2020, judges and magistrates who are sentencing offenders must consider and apply these guidelines.

In March 2025, the Sentencing Council released guidelines relating to the imposition of community and custodial sentences, which included a presumption that a pre-sentence report ought to be ordered for offenders from a number of groups and statuses, including age and gender, serious chronic medical conditions, being a sole or primary carer for relatives, being a victim of trafficking or domestic abuse, and being from a minority ethnic, cultural or religious background.

Supporters of the change argued that the new guidelines would potentially contribute to undoing existing inequalities in sentencing and make the justice system fairer. Opponents argued it amounted to "two-tier" justice: Robert Jenrick, the shadow justice minister, said of the guidelines: "this seems like blatant bias, particularly against Christians, and against straight white men".

The Secretary of State for Justice, Shabana Mahmood, requested that the Sentencing Council overturn the guidelines. The Sentencing Council later delayed the guidelines.

== Provisions ==
The act contains one clause, which amends Section 120 of the Coroners and Justice Act 2009 to forbid the use of "personal characteristics" including race, religion and cultural background in guidance relating to pre-sentence reports.

== Subsequent developments ==
Section 20 of the Sentencing Act 2026 requires the Sentencing Council to seek approval of the Lord Chancellor and Lord/Lady Chief Justice when making or amending sentencing guidelines. The Government stated this measure improves "democratic oversight" of the Sentencing Council to avoid the political conflicts that led to dispute around pre-sentence reports. The inclusion of this provision in the 2026 legislation has been criticised by the Institute for Government as undermining the independence of the Sentencing Council.

== See also ==
- Sentencing in England and Wales
- Sentencing Act 2020
- Coroners and Justice Act 2009
