= Sentencing Act 2026 =

Act of the Parliament of the United Kingdom

Sentencing Act 2026 (Note: Section 50.)
- Act of Parliament
- Parliament of the United Kingdom
- Long title: An Act to make provision about the sentencing, release and management after sentencing of offenders; to make provision about bail; to make provision about the removal from the United Kingdom of foreign criminals; and for connected purposes.
- Citation: 2026 c. 2
- Introduced by: Shabana Mahmood MP, Secretary of State for Justice (Commons); Lord Timpson, Minister of State for Prisons, Probation and Reducing Reoffending (Lords)
- Territorial extent: England and Wales; Scotland and Northern Ireland (sections 18, 34(4), 34(5), 39(7) and part 5); (Note: Section 48.)

Dates
- Royal assent: 22 January 2026
- Commencement: Various (Note: Section 49.)
Other legislation
Amends	Prison Act 1952; Administration of Justice Act 1970; Bail Act 1974; Rehabilitation of Offenders Act 1974; Bail Act 1976; Repatriation of Prisoners Act 1984; Road Traffic Offenders Act 1988; Prisons (Scotland) Act 1989; Prisoners and Criminal Proceedings (Scotland) Act 1993; Criminal Procedure (Scotland) Act 1995; Crime (Sentences) Act 1997; Criminal Justice and Court Services Act 2000; Nationality, Immigration and Asylum Act 2002; Criminal Justice Act 2003; Armed Forces Act 2006; Offender Management Act 2007; UK Borders Act 2007; Criminal Justice (Northern Ireland) Order 2008; Coroners and Justice Act 2009; Legal Aid, Sentencing and Punishment of Offenders Act 2012; Offender Rehabilitation Act 2014; Criminal Justice and Courts Act 2015; Terrorist Offenders (Restriction of Early Release) Act 2020; Sentencing Act 2020; Police, Crime, Sentencing and Courts Act 2022; Victims and Prisoners Act 2024
Repeals/revokes	Criminal Justice Act 2003 (Requisite and Minimum Custodial Periods) Order 2024

Status: Current legislation

History of passage through Parliament

Text of statute as originally enacted

Revised text of statute as amended

The Sentencing Act 2026 (c. 2) is an act of the Parliament of the United Kingdom primarily concerned with criminal sentencing in England and Wales (with a few measures also affecting Scotland and Northern Ireland).

== Background ==
During 2024, prisons in England and Wales came very close to exceeding their occupational capacity. Some prisoners were released early in order to ease pressures on prison capacity. In October 2024, the British Government commissioned the former Secretary of State for Justice David Gauke to conduct an Independent Sentencing Review.

The review concluded in May 2025 and recommended introducing an earned early release system for prisoners, the abolition of most short custodial sentences, as well as increasing the use of alternatives to prison including community sentences, deferred and suspended sentences.

On 2 September 2025, the Sentencing Bill was introduced to the House of Commons in order to implement recommendations from the Independent Sentencing Review.

== Provisions ==
A significant number of the provisions amend the Sentencing Act 2020 (also known as the 'Sentencing Code').

Part 1 is primarily concerned with sentencing procedure of the courts, as well as the Sentencing Council. It includes a provision allowing courts to impose 'income reduction orders' on offenders on a suspended sentence requiring them to pay a percentage of their monthly income.

Under provisions in Part 1, courts are also granted a wider range of ancillary orders to forbid offenders from entering specific areas, attending sports events, entering drinking establishments (either particular named venues, specific types of venues, or all establishments) or driving. These behaviour orders were recommended by the Bar Council of England and Wales, but concerns were raised about the practicality and enforceability of pub bans by representatives of the hospitality sector.

Section 20 requires the Sentencing Council to seek approval of the Lord Chancellor and Lord/Lady Chief Justice when making or amending sentencing guidelines. The Government stated this measure improves "democratic oversight" of the Sentencing Council to avoid the political conflicts that led to the passage of the Sentencing Guidelines (Pre-sentence Reports) Act 2025. This has been criticised by the Institute for Government as undermining the independence of the Sentencing Council.

The provisions scrapping the use of short prison sentences came into force on 23 March 2026.

Part 2 deals with management of offenders including early release on licence, recall, early removal of foreign offenders, and the operation of the Parole Board.

Part 3 amends the Bail Act 1976.

Part 4 makes it easier to remove foreign national offenders under the Early Removal Scheme (by amending section 260 of the Criminal Justice Act 2003), as recommended by the Independent Sentencing Review.

Part 5 contains general provisions.

== Reception ==
The early release scheme was due to go into force in September 2026. Following considerable press scrutiny, in July 2026, Andy Burnham announced the scheme would be paused pending review. Early releases started on 1 October 2026.

== See also ==
- Coroners and Justice Act 2009
