= John Lawler inquest =

Inquest into the death of John Lawler

The John Lawler inquest was an inquest into the death of John Lawler in 2019. Lawler, an 80-year-old man, died following complications from a chiropractic treatment in York, England. He had sought relief for back pain at the clinic of chiropractor Arleen Scholten in August 2017, but during a spinal manipulation session, he suffered severe complications that led to his hospitalization and death the following day. A coroner's inquest was overseen by Jonathan Heath, which examined whether Scholten’s actions contributed to the fatal outcome. Although a connection between the treatment and Lawler’s death was identified, Scholten was not found criminally negligent. The case prompted the Judiciary of England and Wales to issue a prevention of future deaths report.

== Background ==
John Lawler, aged 80, visited Arleen Scholten’s chiropractic clinic in York on August 11, 2017, for relief from chronic back pain. During the session, Scholten performed spinal manipulations, which soon caused Lawler to experience serious medical complications. He was subsequently hospitalized and died the next day. The 2019 inquest investigated whether Scholten’s treatment was appropriate for Lawler’s condition and if it directly caused his death. Though the spinal manipulation was found to be a factor in Lawler's demise, Scholten was cleared of wrongdoing after the inquest.

== Incident and investigation ==
Following Lawler’s death, a coroner’s inquest was launched to determine whether Scholten’s treatment directly contributed to the fatal outcome. The inquest examined the appropriateness of the chiropractic procedures performed and whether they were executed in accordance with standard practices. Medicine watchdog website Science-Based Medicine criticized the regulatory body General Chiropractic Council for not taking action against Scholten after Lawler’s death.

The coroner's report emphasized that Lawler's spine was more fragile than expected due to calcification, a condition common in older patients, which made his spine more prone to injury. The inquest also noted that no X-rays were taken before treatment, which may have revealed the severity of Lawler’s condition.

== Coroner's inquest ==
The inquest, held in 2019, examined whether Scholten's spinal manipulations were responsible for Lawler's death. The coroner, Jonathan Heath, heard testimony from experts who outlined the risks associated with high-velocity spinal manipulations, particularly in patients with conditions like Lawler's. Testimony from Lawler's widow detailed how he expressed discomfort during the treatment, including complaints of severe pain and numbness.

The coroner criticized the lack of pre-treatment imaging, which could have informed Scholten of Lawler's condition, and noted that Scholten’s handling of the emergency, including the misleading information given to paramedics, was concerning. However, the inquest concluded that Lawler’s calcified spine contributed significantly to the severity of the injury and that there was no intent of wrongdoing on Scholten’s part.

== Verdict and outcome ==
After reviewing the evidence, the coroner concluded that Lawler’s death was due to complications from the chiropractic treatment but did not attribute criminal negligence to Arleen Scholten. The inquest resulted in a narrative verdict, meaning no charges were brought against her. However, the case prompted calls for stricter regulations within the chiropractic profession, including the recommendation that chiropractors conduct pre-treatment imaging, such as X-rays, on patients with similar medical histories.

== Aftermath and impact ==
The inquest into John Lawler’s death had a significant impact on the chiropractic profession and public awareness of the risks associated with spinal manipulations. It led to renewed discussions on the importance of thorough patient assessments, particularly for elderly patients with pre-existing spinal conditions. Professional chiropractic associations emphasized the necessity for clearer communication between chiropractors and their patients, ensuring that all potential risks are fully understood.
