= General Chiropractic Council =

Chiropractic regulatory body of the UK

- Abbreviation: GCC
- Location: London, England
- Coordinates: 51.48557°N 0.10905°W
- Members: 3,302 (2017)
- Official language: English
- Chief Executive: Nick Jones
- Staff: 14 (2017)
- Website: www.gcc-uk.org

The General Chiropractic Council (GCC) is an independent statutory body established by Parliament to regulate the chiropractic profession in the United Kingdom. It protects the health and safety of the public by ensuring high standards of practice in the chiropractic profession.

It was established by the Chiropractors Act 1994 to protect the public by regulating chiropractors, set standards for professional education, practice and conduct and to ensure the development of the chiropractic profession.

The GCC is one of nine health and social care regulators in the UK that are regulated by the Professional Standards Authority for Health and Social Care.

The General Chiropractic Council provides a searchable database of registered chiropractors. It is illegal to call oneself a Chiropractor in the UK without being registered with the GCC.

== Organisation ==
The GCC is led by a council that is responsible for ensuring the GCC carries out its core functions. The General Council is formed of seven non-chiropractors and seven chiropractors and meets six times a year. Each member serves for 3 or 4 years. The GCC has four Statutory Committees which support the work of the Council. They are:

- The Education Committee
- The Investigating Committee
- The Health Committee
- The Professional Conduct Committee

The GCC is also supported by two non-statutory Committees. They are:

- Audit Committee
- Remuneration Committee

The GCC may also set up short-term Working Groups as required.

== Other UK healthcare regulators ==
The Professional Standards Authority for Health and Social Care (PSA) is an independent body accountable to the UK Parliament which promotes the health and wellbeing of the public and oversees the nine UK healthcare regulators. These are:

- General Medical Council
- Nursing and Midwifery Council
- General Dental Council
- General Pharmaceutical Council
- General Optical Council
- Health and Care Professions Council
- General Osteopathic Council
- Pharmaceutical Society of Northern Ireland

== See also ==
- John Lawler inquest
