= Abdullah Shah =

Afghan serial killer

- Born: 1965
- Died: 20 April 2004 (aged 38–39); Kabul, Afghanistan
- Other name: Zardad's dog
- Status: Executed by shooting
- Conviction: Murder (20 counts)
- Penalty: Death

Details
- Victims: 20+
- Country: Afghanistan

Abdullah Shah (1965 – 20 April 2004) was an Afghan serial killer found guilty in Kabul of killing more than 20 people, including his wife. His sanctioned execution was the first in Afghanistan since the fall of the Taliban in late 2001.

== Biography ==
Shah served under Zardad Khan—even earning the nickname Zardad's dog—who served under Gulbuddin Hekmatyar in the civil war in Afghanistan (1992–1996). Shah and Zardad robbed travellers on the road from Kabul to Jalalabad.

He was first convicted in special court proceedings in October 2002. Nine people testified against him at the trial, including another wife he tried to set on fire. The bodies of many of Shah's victims were found in a well in Paghman District.

The execution took place in the Pul-e-Charkhi jail. Interim president Hamid Karzai signed the death warrant. At the execution, Shah was shot in the back of the head. Witnesses present included representatives of the Afghan police, the Attorney General's office and doctors.

Amnesty International protested against the execution claiming Afghanistan avoided basic standards of fairness. The organization added that Shah was probably silenced so he could not testify against commanders allied to the government. It said he was not provided with a defence attorney, the trial was secret, a confession was obtained under torture and the first judge in his case was dismissed for taking a bribe. The second judge came under pressure from the Supreme Court to impose the sentence.

== See also ==
- List of serial killers by country
- List of serial killers by number of victims
