= Juliet May (judge) =

British barrister and judge (born 1961)

The Right Honourable Lady Justice May DBE
- Royal coat of arms of the United Kingdom

Lady Justice of Appeal
- Incumbent
- Assumed office 13 November 2025

High Court Judge King's Bench Division
- In office 2015–2025

Personal details
- Born: 21 March 1961 (age 65)
- Education: Wadham College, Oxford

Dame Juliet Mary May (born 21 March 1961), styled The Rt Hon. Lady Justice May, is a judge of Court of Appeal of England and Wales.

May was educated at Wadham College, Oxford and worked as a forensic clinical psychologist before retraining as a barrister. She was called to the bar at Inner Temple in 1988, working in chambers at 3 Verulam Buildings.

She was appointed Queen's Counsel and a Circuit Judge in 2008. She was a judge of the King's Bench Division from 2015 to 2025.

She was appointed as Judicial Lead for Youth Justice for England and Wales in November 2022, before her appointment as Chair of the Sentencing Council on 6 October 2025. She was appointed a Lady Justice of Appeal and sworn of the Privy Council in December 2025.

== Notable cases ==
Lady Justice May has presided over a number of notable criminal trials and has delivered several significant judgments in the Court of Appeal and Divisional Court, particularly in relation to sentencing, youth justice and criminal procedure.

- Gordon Park "Lady in the Lake" appeal (2020)
- Bosley Wood Mill explosion manslaughter trial (2021)
- R v ZA appeal (2023)
- Antony Snook murders (2024)
- Quaye Judicial Review (2024)

=== Gordon Park "Lady in the Lake" appeal (2020) ===
This case was a posthumous appeal against the conviction of Gordon Park in 2005 for the murder of his wife Carol, who had disappeared in 1976 and whose body was found at the bottom of Coniston Water 21 years later. The conviction was based on a combination of forensic evidence, eyewitness reports of a package being deposited in the lake and alleged prison confessions heard by other prisoners when Park was serving time for unrelated offences in HMP Preston.

Park had committed suicide in 2009 following the failure of a previous appeal, but had protested his innocence, supported by the couple's children. The conviction was subsequently referred to the Court of Appeal in 2019 after the Criminal Case Review Commission (CCRC) had said that it had found new evidence.

Following review, the Court of Appeal upheld the original conviction in 2020.

=== Bosley Wood Mill explosion manslaughter trial (2021) ===
May was the presiding judge in the trial of George Boden, who was the managing director of a wood mill in Bosley, Cheshire, where four workers died in an explosion in 2015. Boden had originally been charged with gross negligence manslaughter, but was acquitted in April and subsequently pleaded guilty to being the director of a company which committed an offence under the Health and Safety at Work Act. The firm was fined £75,000 and Boden was given a suspended sentence.

=== R v ZA appeal (2023) ===
In R v ZA, May sat as a member of the Court of Appeal in a significant judgment concerning the sentencing of children and young people convicted of serious offences. ZA, who was aged 15 at the time of the offending, had been convicted of conspiracy to rob following a fatal robbery in which the victim was killed by another member of the group. Although acquitted of murder and manslaughter, he was sentenced to five years' detention for the robbery offence and appealed against sentence.

Allowing the appeal, the Court reduced the sentence from five years to three years' detention, holding that the sentencing judge had failed properly to apply the Sentencing Council's youth-specific guidelines and had instead placed undue reliance on adult sentencing principles. The judgment emphasised that children must be sentenced on an individual basis, with proper regard to their age, maturity, welfare and capacity for rehabilitation. The Court also set out practical guidance for judges and advocates on the sentencing of young offenders, including the preparation of sentencing notes, the application of youth-specific guidelines and the need to distinguish carefully between child and adult defendants in multi-handed cases. The judgment has subsequently become an important authority on the sentencing of children and young people.

=== Antony Snook murders (2024) ===
May presided over the trial of Antony Snook, who drove the car four teenagers as they carried out the murder of two teenage boys in Bristol in January 2024. He had tried to claim that he was ignorant of the teenagers' plan but this defence was rejected by the jury. Snook was sentenced to a minimum of 38 years in prison.

=== Quaye Judicial Review (2024) ===
In R. (Quaye) v Secretary of State for Justice, May was one of the judges in the Court of Appeal who considered whether amendments introduced by the Police, Crime, Sentencing and Courts Act 2022 had unlawfully removed the right of offenders who had committed offences before the age of 18, but had been sentenced after turning 18, to have their sentences reviewed in the light of their rehabilitation progress. The Court upheld the challenge, ruling that treating two child offenders based on their age at sentencing was arbitrary and breached the European Convention on Human Rights.
