= Faryadi Sarwar Zardad =

Afghan former warlord

Faryadi Sarwar Zardad فریادی سرور زرداد
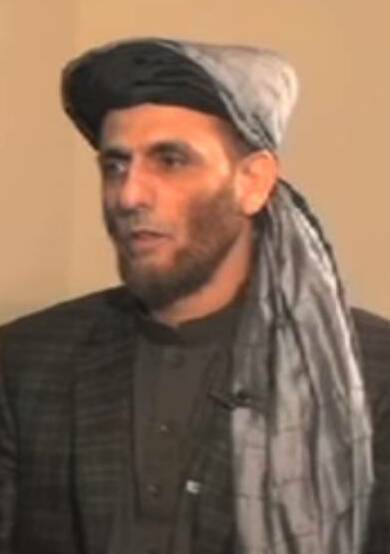
- Zardad in 2016
- Born: 1963 (age 62–63); Afghanistan
- Occupations: warlord, Mujahideen leader

Faryadi Sarwar Zardad (also known as Zardad Khan and Commander Zardad; born c. 1963) is an Afghan former warlord and mujahideen leader. In 2005, he was convicted in the United Kingdom (where he was living), for conspiring to take hostages and conspiring to torture during the 1990s in Afghanistan.

== Early life and war crimes ==
Faryadi Sarwar Zardad is Pashtun and was born circa 1963 in Afghanistan. He is a former Mujahideen leader who fought during the Soviet invasion of Afghanistan. He ran a Sarobi checkpoint, blocking the major route heading from Jalalabad into Kabul, that commonly robbed, abducted and killed travellers between 31 December 1991 to 30 September 1996.

A widely publicised allegation regarding Zardad was that one of his militiamen, Abdullah Shah, viciously bit prisoners and had even eaten at least one victim's testicles. Shah was described as a "human dog" and kept in a cave with a chain around his neck by Zardad, and brought out to intimidate captured travellers. Shah was reportedly executed by the Afghan government in April 2004.

In 1998, Zardad fled to Britain using a false passport to avoid persecution under the ruling Taliban, and requested asylum. He was the subject of an exposé on a BBC television programme, Newsnight, first broadcast on 26 July 2000. Zardad's presence in London had been discussed with a BBC reporter, John Simpson, by the Taliban's Foreign Minister in Kabul, Wakil Ahmed Muttawakil, during an interview in 1999.

The minister had retorted to a question that "Well, you British are sheltering the criminal Commander Zardad". The BBC eventually tracked Zardad down after nearly a year, and found him living in Mitcham, London. He was interviewed by Simpson for the programme, in which Zardad claimed to have been based in Kabul and had only visited Sarobi as an adviser to the local commanders. After the BBC report, Revolutionary Association of the Women of Afghanistan (RAWA) launched an international campaign urging the British government to prosecute Zardad. They issued a statement in many languages and circulated it through the Internet.

RAWA also issued a report entitled "Some reports of crimes committed by Zardad in Afghanistan", which were used in his prosecution.

Zardad was briefly arrested on 10 May 2003 by officers of the Scotland Yard's anti-terrorist branch and bailed only to be re-arrested on 14 July 2003, by which time he was living in Streatham and had been running a pizza parlour in Bexleyheath for three years.

== The trials ==
=== The first trial ===
The day following his arrest he was charged with 16 offenses relating to his time as a military commander during the Afghan civil war in the early 1990s. There were nine counts under §134 (1) of the Criminal Justice Act 1988 that, as a military commander in the Sarobi region of Afghanistan, he tortured or gave orders to carry out torture as part of his official duties; five counts under §1(1) of the Taking of Hostages Act 1982 that he detained hostages and held them to ransom, and two charges, under §1(1) of the Criminal Law Act 1977, that he had conspired to carry out or order torture and hostage-taking.

Although the alleged crimes had taken place outside of the United Kingdom, the Law Lords had ruled in March 1999 when examining the case against General Augusto Pinochet that torture is a crime of universal jurisdiction and thus could be prosecuted within the United Kingdom; and indeed the UK was obliged under the United Nations Convention Against Torture to either extradite or prosecute someone facing plausible accusations of torture. Hostage taking is similarly a crime of universal jurisdiction under the International Convention against the Taking of Hostages. The trial took place in October 2004, with Zardad pleading not guilty to all of the charges.

During the trial, the prosecutor, Lord Goldsmith, stated that he believed that this was the first time in which someone had been prosecuted in one jurisdiction for alleged offences committed in the other. One witness testified that he was stopped at a checkpoint by men with covered faces and sunglasses and tied to a nearby metal chair, where he was interrogated and tortured. Another, a lorry driver, claimed to have been kept prisoner for six months until a ransom was paid by the driver's brother. Zardad also denied having previously admitted to the British police that he attended a 15-day training camp where he had learned to use AK-47s, rocket launchers and other weapons. However, the jury was unable to come to a verdict.

=== The second trial ===
Zardad was retried in 2005, with charges of conspiracy to torture, and conspiracy to take hostages, both contrary to the 1977 Criminal Law Act. Evidence was taken from 16 witnesses via a video link to the British Embassy in Kabul. As in the first trial, a court order prevented the identities of many of the victims and witnesses from being revealed for fear of retaliation.

The trial included evidence of:

- Summary executions and hostage taking
- The killing of 10 or 11 men in a minibus; their families screaming at the roadside
- An elderly man whipped and locked in a metal cupboard
- A man having petrol poured over him whilst Saleh's militia joked about setting fire to it.
- A small boy witnessing his father's ear being cut off.

=== The outcome ===
The jury in the second trial found him guilty on 18 July 2005, and he was sentenced 20 years in prison – receiving 20 years for each of the two charges to be served concurrently. The judge, Mr Justice Colman Treacy, QC, recommended that Zardad be deported upon release. It was reported in December 2016 that he had been so deported.

A video, Zardad's Dog, of parts of the 2002 Kabul trial of Abdullah Shah, was withdrawn from the October 2004 Turner Prize exhibition at the Tate Gallery just before the first trial started, to avoid potential contempt of court prosecution. It was not publicly displayed until 3 October 2005.
