= Colman Treacy =

The Right Honourable Sir Colman Treacy

Lord Justice of Appeal
- In office 1 October 2012 – 9 October 2018

Justice of the High Court
- In office 1 October 2002 – 1 October 2012

Personal details
- Born: Colman Maurice Treacy; 28 July 1949 (age 77)
- Spouse: Jane Hooper
- Education: Jesus College, Cambridge
- Occupation: Judge

Sir Colman Maurice Treacy (born 28 July 1949) is a retired Lord Justice of Appeal and Chairman of the Sentencing Council from November 2011. Previously, he was a barrister in Birmingham. He presided over a number of criminal trials, including those of an Afghan warlord, Faryadi Sarwar Zardad, and two of the killers of Stephen Lawrence.

== Early life ==
Treacy attended Stonyhurst College, a Jesuit private boarding school in the Ribble Valley, Lancashire, and studied Classics on an Open Scholarship at Jesus College, Cambridge. He was called to the Bar at the Middle Temple in 1971, and appointed Queen's Counsel (QC) in 1990.

== Career ==
Treacy practised mainly in criminal law in the criminal courts of Birmingham. In 2002, he prosecuted two suspected Islamic terrorists accused of plotting to cause terrorist explosions in the UK, before Mr Justice Hughes. One of the accused, Moinul Abedin, was convicted and sentenced to 20 years, while the other was acquitted.

He was appointed Assistant Recorder in 1988 and Recorder in 1991, a post he retained until his appointment to the High Court on 1 October 2002, whereupon he received the customary knighthood. From 2006 to 2010, he was a Presiding Judge of the Midland Circuit. He was chairman of the Sentencing Council for England and Wales. On 1 October 2012, he was appointed a Lord Justice of Appeal, and he was appointed to the Privy Council on 7 November 2012.

=== Crown Court cases ===
Treacy presided over a number of criminal trials. In 2005, he presided at the trial of Faryadi Sarwar Zardad, an Afghan warlord charged under the principle of universal jurisdiction with conspiracy to torture and conspiracy to take hostages during the 1990s in Afghanistan. He was sentenced to 20 years in prison and recommended to be deported. On sentencing notorious Nottingham gang boss Colin Gunn to 35 years for conspiracy to murder the parents of a gangland rival, Gunn told Treacy to "die of AIDS".

In 2010, he was the judge at the first major English criminal trial in more than 400 years to be heard without a jury. The decision by the Court of Appeal to allow the trial without a jury came after the third attempt at a trial fell apart due to attempts at jury tampering. The decision was criticised by Shami Chakrabarti, of Liberty. The case concerned the £1.7 million robbery of the Menzies World Cargo warehouse at Heathrow airport in February 2004, of which all four of the accused were convicted. The trial reportedly cost £25,000,000.

In December 2011, Treacy presided over the trial of Gary Dobson and David Norris for the racially aggravated murder of Stephen Lawrence. Lawrence had been murdered while waiting at a bus stop in Eltham, South London, in April 1993, by a gang of white youths chanting racist slogans. Five men had been arrested and two were charged but the prosecution was dropped by the Crown Prosecution Service due to lack of evidence.

A private prosecution by the Lawrence family in 1994 of three of the suspects resulted in their acquittal due to unreliability of the identification evidence. The 1999 Macpherson Review of the case found shortcomings in the original police investigation and concluded the Metropolitan Police Force was rife with "institutional racism" and recommended a reduction in double jeopardy, the rule preventing someone being tried for the same crime twice, to allow for cases where "fresh and viable" new evidence became available to be retried. This proposal was supported by the Law Commission in 2001 and given effect by Parliament in the Criminal Justice Act 2003. In 2011, eighteen years after the incident, a cold case review found new DNA evidence using techniques not available at the time of the original investigation. Dobson and Norris were prosecuted in December that year and convicted on 3 January 2012, being ordered to be detained at Her Majesty's pleasure with minimum terms of fifteen years and two months, and fourteen years and three months, respectively.
