= Inquests in England and Wales =

Judicial inquiry of unexplained deaths in England and Wales

Inquests in England and Wales are held into sudden or unexplained deaths and also into the circumstances of and discovery of a certain class of valuable artefacts known as "treasure trove". In England and Wales, inquests are the responsibility of a coroner, who operates under the jurisdiction of the Coroners and Justice Act 2009. In some circumstances where an inquest cannot view or hear all the evidence, it may be suspended and a public inquiry held with the consent of the Home Secretary.

== Where an inquest is needed ==
There is a general duty upon every person to report a death to the coroner if an inquest is likely to be required. However, this duty is largely unenforceable in practice and the duty falls on the responsible registrar. The registrar must report a death where:

- The deceased was not attended by a doctor during their last illness
- The death occurred within 24 hours of admission to a hospital
- The cause of death has not been certified by a doctor who saw the deceased after death or within the 14 days before death
- The cause of death is unknown
- The registrar believes that the cause of death was unnatural, caused by violence, neglect or abortion outside the exemptions of the Abortion Act 1967, or occurred in suspicious circumstances
- Death occurred during surgery of any kind or while under anaesthetic both local and general
- The cause of death was or was suspected to be an industrial disease
- The death relates to public health or the general health or welfare of the public-at-large

The coroner must hold an inquest where the death is:

- Violent or unnatural
- Sudden and of unknown cause
- In prison or police custody
- Suspected to be suicide

Where the cause of death is unknown, the coroner may order a post mortem examination in order to determine whether the death was violent. If the death is found to be non-violent, an inquest is unnecessary.

In 2024 in England and Wales, there were (provisionally) 568,600 deaths of which 174,878 were referred to the coroner. Of those, 81,185 resulted in post-mortem examinations and there were 36,601 inquests, 546 with a jury. In 2014 the Royal College of Pathologists claimed that up to 10,000 deaths a year recorded as being from natural causes should have been investigated by inquests. They were particularly concerned about people whose death occurred as a result of medical errors. "We believe a medical examiner would have been alerted to what was going on in Mid-Staffordshire long before this long list of avoidable deaths reached the total it did," said Archie Prentice, the pathologists' president.

Following further pressure in 2015 from the Royal College of Pathologists citing the Harold Shipman murders as evidence that reforms to the issuing of death certificates was necessary the Department of Justice began a review which was published in August 2024.

== Juries ==
A coroner must summon a jury for an inquest if the death was not a result of natural causes and occurred when the deceased was in state custody (for example in prison, police custody, or whilst detained under the Mental Health Act 1983); or if it was the result of an act or omission of a police officer; or if it was a result of a notifiable accident, poisoning or disease. The senior coroner can also call a jury at their own discretion. This discretion has been heavily litigated in light of the Human Rights Act 1998, which means that juries are required now in a broader range of situations than expressly required by statute.

== Scope of inquest ==
The purpose of the inquest is to answer four questions:

- Identity of the deceased
- Place of death
- Time of death
- How the deceased came by their death

Evidence must be solely for the purpose of answering these questions and no other evidence is admitted. It is not for the inquest to ascertain "how the deceased died" or "in what broad circumstances", but "how the deceased came by his death", a more limited question. Moreover, it is not the purpose of the inquest to determine, or appear to determine, criminal or civil liability, to apportion guilt or attribute blame. For example, where a prisoner hanged themselves in a cell, they came by their death by hanging and it was not the role of the inquest to enquire into the broader circumstances such as the alleged neglect of the prison authorities that might have contributed to the prisoners state of mind or given them the opportunity. However, the inquest should set out as many of the facts as the public interest requires.

Under the terms of article 2 of the European Convention of Human Rights, governments are required to "establish a framework of laws, precautions, procedures and means of enforcement which will, to the greatest extent reasonably practicable, protect life". The European Court of Human Rights has interpreted this as mandating independent official investigation of any death where public servants may be implicated. Since the Human Rights Act 1998 came into force, in those cases alone, the inquest is now to consider the broader question "by what means and in what circumstances".

In disasters, such as the 1987 King's Cross fire, a single inquest may be held into several deaths. Some inquests, such as the John Lawler inquest, result in a prevention of future deaths report.

== Procedure ==
Inquests are governed by the Coroners Rules. The coroner gives notice to near relatives, those entitled to examine witnesses and those whose conduct is likely to be scrutinised. Inquests are held in public except where there are real issues and substantial of national security but only the portions which relate to national security will be held behind closed doors.

Individuals with an interest in the proceedings, such as relatives of the deceased, individuals appearing as witnesses, and organisations or individuals who may face some responsibility in the death of the individual, may be represented by a legal professional be that a solicitor or barrister at the discretion of the coroner. Witnesses may be compelled to testify subject to the privilege against self-incrimination.

If there are matters of national security or matters which relate to sensitive matters then under Schedule 1 of the Coroners and Justice Act 2009 an inquest may be suspended and replaced by a public inquiry under s.2 of the Inquiries Act 2005. This can only be ordered by the Home Secretary and must be announced to Parliament with the coroner in charge being informed and the next of kin being informed. The next of kin and coroner can appeal the decision of the Home Secretary.

== Verdict or conclusions ==
The following conclusions (formerly called verdicts) are not mandatory but are strongly recommended:

- Category 1
  - Natural causes
  - Industrial diseases
  - Dependency on drugs or non-dependent abuse of drugs
  - Lack of attention at birth
  - Lack of care or self-neglect
- Category 2
  - Suicide
  - Attempted or self-induced abortion
  - Accident or misadventure
  - Execution of sentence of death
  - Lawful killing (formerly "justifiable homicide")
  - Open verdict (cause of death unknown or unstated)
- Category 3 – Unlawful killing
  - Murder
  - Manslaughter
  - Infanticide
- Category 4
  - Stillbirth

In 2024, the most recent year for which coronial data is available for England and Wales, 25% of inquest conclusions were recorded as death by accident or misadventure, 12% as natural causes, 13% as suicide, 3% as an open verdict and the remaining 47% comprised other outcomes such as unclassified, alcohol/drug related, industrial disease and road traffic collision conclusions.

Since 2004 it has been possible for the coroner to record a narrative verdict, recording the circumstances of a death without apportioning blame or liability. Since 2009, other possible verdicts have included "alcohol/drug related death" and "road traffic collision". The civil standard of proof, on the balance of probabilities, is used for all conclusions. The standard of proof for suicide and unlawful killing changed in 2018 from beyond all reasonable doubt to the balance of probabilities following a case in the courts of appeal.

== Modernisation ==
Owing in particular to the failures to notice the serial murder committed by Harold Shipman, the Coroners and Justice Act 2009 modernised the system with:

- Greater rights of bereaved people to contribute to coroners' investigations;
- A new office of chief coroner to lead and supervise practice;
- Full-time coroners with new district boundaries;
- Broader investigatory powers for coroners;
- Improved medical support for coroners' investigation and decision making;
- Vesting of treasure jurisdiction in the new office of treasure coroner with national responsibility.

In September 2024, comprehensive reforms to the death certification process in England and Wales took effect, introducing a statutory Medical Examiner (ME) system for all deaths not investigated by a coroner. From 9 September 2024, every non-coronial death must be independently reviewed by a senior doctor not involved in the deceased’s care before a Medical Certificate of Cause of Death (MCCD) can be issued, replacing the previous largely non-statutory ME scrutiny.

The MCCD was redesigned to include new fields such as a distinct line (1d) for cause of death, the deceased’s ethnicity, pregnancy status, and the presence of implantable medical devices, aligning with international standards and improving mortality data quality.

Under the reforms, death registration cannot proceed until an ME (or coroner) confirms the cause, and registrars no longer refer deaths to coroners; this responsibility rests with clinicians and MEs.

The reforms also aimed to enhance public protection and transparency by offering bereaved families the opportunity to discuss the cause of death with an ME and to reduce unnecessary coroner referrals, thereby improving efficiency in the system.

== See also ==
- Committal procedure
- Fatal accident inquiry, Scotland
- Immunity from prosecution
- Preliminary hearing
- Prevention of future deaths report

== Bibliography ==
- Bishop, M. (2004). "Coroners' Law Resource". King's College London. Archived from the original on 6 August 2007.
- Department for Constitutional Affairs (2006). "Coroners Service Reform Briefing Note" (PDF). Archived from the original (PDF) on 25 May 2011. (156 KB)
- Dorries, C. (2004). Coroners Courts: A Guide to Law and Practice (2nd ed.). Oxford: Oxford University Press. ISBN 0-471-96721-1.
- Hodder, Elizabeth; McAuley, Deirdre; Heaton-Armstrong, Anthony; Berry, Colin; Sacranie, Iqbal; Luce, Tom (2003). "Death Certification and Investigation in England, Wales and Northern Ireland, The Report of a Fundamental Review 2003" (PDF). Home Office. Cm 5831. Archived from the original (PDF) on 25 September 2007. (1.17 MB)
- — (2003b) "Third Report into Death Certification and the Investigation of Deaths by Coroners" (PDF). Archived from the original (PDF) on 25 September 2007. (191 KB), Cm 5854
- — (2004) "Position Paper Reforming the Coroner and Death Certification Service" (PDF). (382 KB), Cm 6159, ISBN 0-10-161592-2
- Levine, Montague (1999). Coroners' Courts. Sweet & Maxwell. ISBN 0-7520-0607-X.
- Mackay of Clashfern, James Peter Hymers, ed. (2006). "Coroners". Halsbury's Laws of England. Vol. 9 (4th reissue ed.). Butterworths. ISBN 978-0-406-99946-7.
- Matthews, P. (2007). Jervis on Coroners (13th rev. ed.). London: Sweet & Maxwell. ISBN 978-1-84703-114-3.
- Thomas, T.; Thomas, C. (2002). Inquests: A Practitioner's Guide. London: Legal Action Group. ISBN 0-905099-97-4.
