= Highsted Grammar School =

Location
- Highsted Road; Sittingbourne, Kent, ME10 4PT; England; 51.3331°N 0.7368°E

Information
- Type: Grammar school; Academy
- Motto: Esse quam videri
- Established: 1904
- Local authority: Kent
- Department for Education URN: 136305 Tables
- Ofsted: Reports
- Head teacher: Anne Kelly
- Sex: Female
- Age: 11 to 18
- Enrollment: 865
- Houses: Chanel, Eliot, Franklin, Keller, Roddick, Seacole
- Website: www.highsted.kent.sch.uk

Highsted Grammar School is a state-funded selective secondary school (grammar school) for girls in Sittingbourne, Kent.

== History ==
The school was established in 1904 in Brenchley House on Sittingbourne High Street as Sittingbourne High School for Girls. It moved to its current site in Highsted Road in the late 1950s, at which time it was known as Sittingbourne Girls’ Grammar School (SGGS).

=== Second World War ===
As Sittingbourne County School for Girls it was evacuated to Hengoed in Wales.

=== Academy status ===
The school, now known as Highsted Grammar School, converted to Academy status in 2011. It now takes both boys and girls into its Sixth Form.

In September 2013, Anne Kelly took over as headteacher after the retirement of former headteacher Jennifer Payne.

== School operation ==
In common with many secondary schools in England, Highsted has a house system. When formed in 1904 the houses were: Briton, Cymru, Scots and Spartan. The houses now are: Chanel, Eliot, Franklin, Keller, Roddick, and Seacole.

== Social ==
A Facebook page was set up in 2014 with the aim of creating a Highsted Old Girls Association.
