= Alice Litman =

English transgender woman (2002–2022)

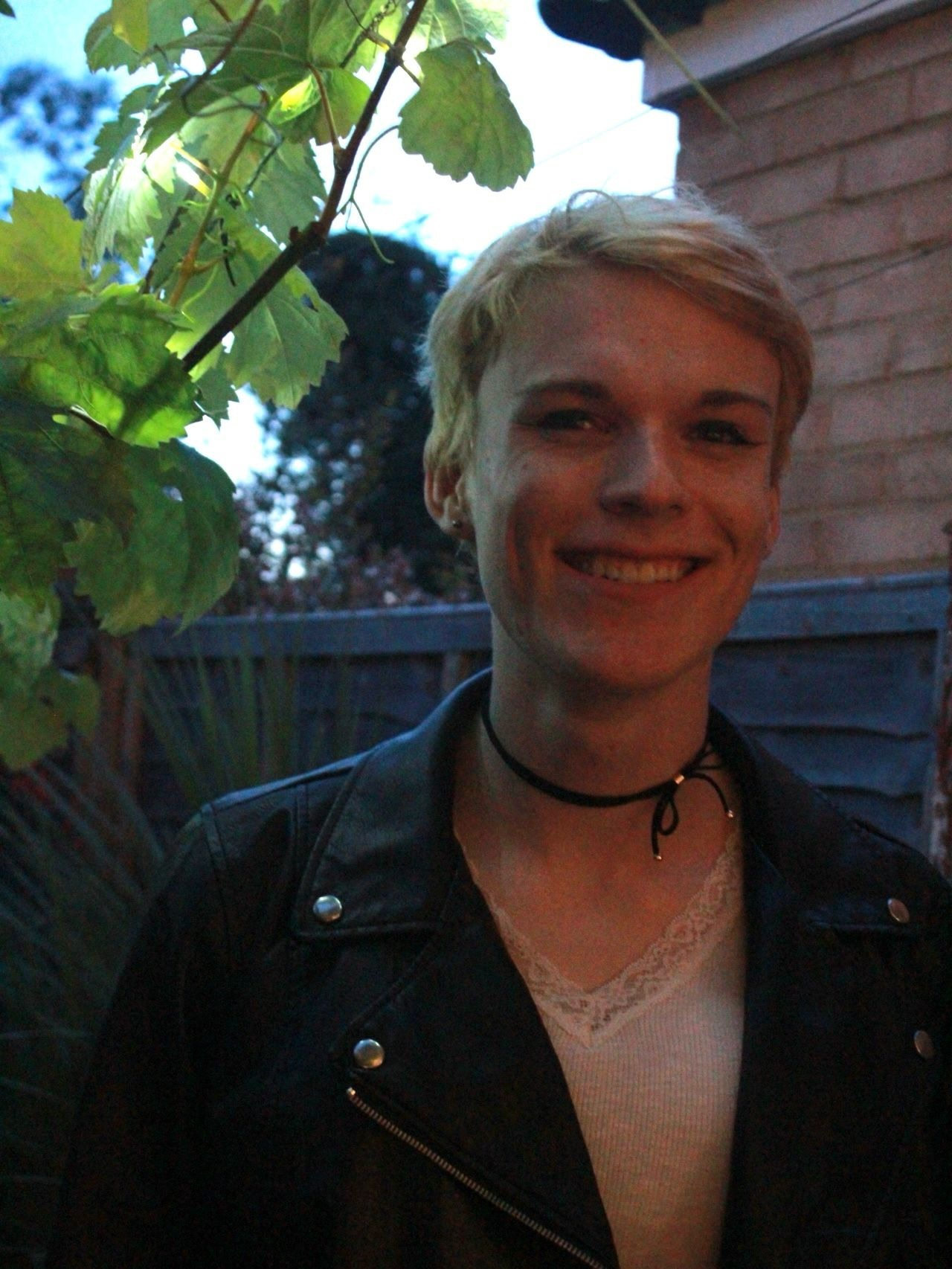
- Litman in 2019
- Born: 23 February 2002; Surrey, England
- Died: Brighton, England
- Cause of death: Suicide
- Body discovered: 26 May 2022 (aged 20)

Alice Litman (23 February 2002 – c. 26 May 2022) was an English transgender woman. Her suicide, following 1,023 days on the waiting list for her first appointment with the Gender Identity Development Service (GIDS), led to an inquest, which found numerous failures in her care. She has been mourned at numerous events including the benefit concert Trans Mission.

== Biography and legacy ==
Litman was born on 23 February 2002 and was from Effingham, Surrey. She had a brother and a sister and identified as bisexual. Her mother was a psychiatrist. In September 2018, she sought medical support for her gender transition from her general practitioner (GP), who suggested a "watch and wait" approach. Following a suicide attempt in June 2019, she was referred to Surrey and Borders Partnership NHS Foundation Trust's Child and Adolescent Mental Health Services (CAMHS) and in August to the GIDS. She made a further suicide attempt in December and was discharged from CAMHS in March 2020 for not meeting the threshold for adult intervention.

Litman was prescribed gender-affirming hormone therapy by the private clinic GenderGP in April. She moved with a friend to Albion Hill in Brighton in September 2021, though returned at Easter, where she reported thoughts of suicide. She submitted an online form to her Brighton GP to that effect on 26 April 2022, and was found dead exactly one month later on the Undercliff Walk in Roedean. Her suicide, which some sources published from September 2023 onwards state happened on 22 May, happened 1,023 days after she was added to the waiting list for GIDS.

An inquest into Litman's death was heard over three days from 18 September 2023 by Brighton and Hove Coroner's Court at County Cricket Ground in Hove and was led by coroner Sarah Clarke, who had previously led a pre-inquest review at Woodvale Coroner's Court in Brighton on 27 January. Clarke criticised the funding levels and resources for transgender healthcare services following the inquest and, following a two-week adjournment, both Litman's "non-existent" transfer from mental health services for children to those for adults and the "half-hearted" support she received generally.

Following her death, Alice was mourned at Transgender Day of Remembrance vigils in 2022 and 2023, with Kate Litman, Alice's sister, speaking at the former. Kate set up Campaign for Alice in her memory by June 2024 with Caroline Litman, Alice's mother. Caroline wrote a memoir, Her Name is Alice, which discussed Alice's life and death and was published by HarperCollins in March 2025. She also spoke at the March 2026 concert Trans Mission, which paid tribute to her.

== See also ==
- Suicide among LGBTQ people (list of suicides)
- List of people from Brighton and Hove
- List of transgender people
- Jason Pulman, English transgender boy who also died by suicide in 2022 under similar circumstances
