= Coroners and Justice Act 2009 =

Act of the Parliament of the United Kingdom

Coroners and Justice Act 2009 (Note: Section 183.)
- Act of Parliament
- Parliament of the United Kingdom
- Long title: An Act to amend the law relating to coroners, to investigation of deaths and to certification and registration of deaths; to amend the criminal law; to make provision about criminal justice and about dealing with offenders; to make provision about the Commissioner for Victims and Witnesses; to make provision relating to the security of court and other buildings; to make provision about legal aid and about payments for legal services provided in connection with employment matters; to make provision for payments to be made by offenders in respect of benefits derived from the exploitation of material pertaining to offences; to amend the Data Protection Act 1998; and for connected purposes.
- Citation: 2009 c. 25
- Introduced by: Jack Straw, Secretary of State for Justice (Commons); Lord Bach, Parliamentary Under-Secretary of State for Justice (Lords)
- Territorial extent: England and Wales; Scotland (in part); Northern Ireland (in part); (Note: Section 181.)

Dates
- Royal assent: 12 November 2009
- Commencement: 12 November 2009 (in part); 14 December 2009 (in part); 10 January 2010 (in part); 12 January 2010 (in part); 1 February 2010 (in part); 6 April 2010 (in part); (Note: Section 182.)
Other legislation
Amends	Libel Act 1843; Law of Libel Amendment Act 1888; Administration of Justice (Miscellaneous Provisions) Act 1933; Infanticide Act 1938; Homicide Act 1957; Suicide Act 1961; Courts-Martial (Appeals) Act 1968; Courts Act 1971; Pensions (Increase) Act 1971; Juries Act 1974; House of Commons Disqualification Act 1975; Fatal Accidents and Sudden Deaths Inquiry (Scotland) Act 1976; Bail Act 1976; Criminal Law Act 1977; Protection of Children Act 1978; Magistrates' Courts Act 1980; Criminal Appeal (Northern Ireland) Act 1980; Limitation Act 1980; Criminal Attempts Act 1981; Senior Courts Act 1981; Criminal Justice Act 1988; Courts and Legal Services Act 1990; Criminal Procedure (Scotland) Act 1995; Employment Rights Act 1996; Law Reform (Year and a Day Rule) Act 1996; Treasure Act 1996; Defamation Act 1996; Youth Justice and Criminal Evidence Act 1999; International Criminal Court Act 2001; Legal Deposit Libraries Act 2003; Justice (Northern Ireland) Act 2004; Domestic Violence, Crime and Victims Act 2004; Human Tissue Act 2004; Constitutional Reform Act 2005; Animal Welfare Act 2006; Legal Services Act 2007; Criminal Justice and Immigration Act 2008
Repeals/revokes	Libel Act 1792
Amended by	Domestic Violence, Crime and Victims (Amendment) Act 2012; Criminal Justice and Courts Act 2015; Modern Slavery Act 2015; Inquiries into Fatal Accidents and Sudden Deaths etc. (Scotland) Act 2016; Policing and Crime Act 2017; Sentencing (Pre-consolidation Amendments) Act 2020; Sentencing Act 2020; Sentencing Guidelines (Pre-sentence Reports) Act 2025; Sentencing Act 2026
Relates to	Civil Partnerships, Marriages and Deaths (Registration etc) Act 2019

Status: Amended

History of passage through Parliament

Records of Parliamentary debate relating to the statute from Hansard

Text of statute as originally enacted

Revised text of statute as amended

The Coroners and Justice Act 2009 (c. 25) is an act of the Parliament of the United Kingdom. It changed the law on coroners and criminal justice in England and Wales.

Among its provisions are:

- Preventing criminals from profiting from publications about their crimes
- Abolishing the anachronistic offences of sedition and seditious, defamatory and obscene libel
- Re-enacting the provisions of the emergency Criminal Evidence (Witness Anonymity) Act 2008 so that the courts may continue to grant anonymity to vulnerable or intimidated witnesses where this is consistent with a defendant's right to a fair trial
- Criminalising possession of cartoon pornographic images depicting both minors as well as adults where the "predominant impression conveyed" is that the individual (being depicted), is that of a child.
- Criminalising the holding of someone in slavery or servitude, or requiring them to perform forced or compulsory labour
- Provision for the abolition of the office of Coroner of the Queen's Household.
- Creation of the office of Chief Coroner of England and Wales.
- Creation of the partial defence of loss of control.

The law has been condemned by a coalition of graphic artists, publishers and MPs, fearing it will criminalise graphic novels such as Lost Girls and Watchmen. These sections came into effect on 6 April 2010.

The act contains measures to reform the coroner system. According to the Institute of Legal Executives, "There is provision, carefully circumscribed, for the establishment of a judicial inquiry under the 2005 Inquiries Act to take the place of an inquest, where there is highly sensitive evidence (typically intercept) and it would not be possible to have an Article 2 compliant inquest. These provisions will be used in rare cases only."

The most controversial aspect of the bill are the provisions regarding secret inquests. The provisions had previously been mulled as part of the Counter-Terrorism Act 2008, though ultimately they were dropped before the Counter-Terrorism Bill was finalised. Last-minute concessions, as the Coroners and Justice Bill passed through Parliament, included giving the Lord Chief Justice the power to veto any requests for private inquests and also the power to decide who the judge is.

== Hate crime reform ==
The Criminal Justice and Immigration Act 2008 amended Part 3A of the Public Order Act 1986 to extend hate crime legislation to cover "hatred against a group of persons defined by reference to sexual orientation (whether towards persons of the same sex, the opposite sex or both)".

To prevent that Act being used to inhibit freedom of speech on the subject of homosexuality, the Criminal Justice and Immigration Act also inserted a new section 29JA, entitled "Protection of freedom of expression (sexual orientation)" but sometimes known as the Waddington Amendment (after Lord Waddington who introduced it). It reads:

In this Part, for the avoidance of doubt, the discussion or criticism of sexual conduct or practices or the urging of persons to refrain from or modify such conduct or practices shall not be taken of itself to be threatening or intended to stir up hatred.

During debate on the Coroners and Justice Bill the Government unsuccessfully attempted to repeal section 29JA. Clause 61 (which would have repealed section 29JA) was introduced into Parliament by Jack Straw on 14 January 2009. The clause was voted down by the House of Lords, reinstated by the House of Commons, and voted down again by the Lords before the Commons finally conceded that section 29JA could remain.

== Slavery and forced labour ==
Section 71 of the act criminalises the holding of someone in slavery or servitude, or requiring them to perform forced or compulsory labour. In December 2012, owners of a family patio and paving business in Bedford were successfully prosecuted under this provision. The investigation of forced labour began after the body of one of the family's workers was discovered in 2008. The family was found to be using vulnerable mentally ill, alcoholic, and homeless men for forced labour, holding some men in servitude for decades and paying them as little as £5 a day (the National Minimum Wage at the time was £5.80 per hour for an adult aged 21 or over).

== Sentencing reform ==
Part 4 of the Act established the Sentencing Council for England and Wales, replacing the Sentencing Guidelines Council and the Sentencing Advisory Panel. The Council was given responsibility for preparing sentencing guidelines, monitoring their operation, assessing the resource implications of sentencing, and promoting public awareness of sentencing. Courts were required to follow relevant sentencing guidelines unless satisfied that it would be contrary to the interests of justice to do so.

The Act also introduced a statutory framework governing the preparation, consultation and publication of sentencing guidelines and established the membership and appointment process for the Council.

== Coroners (Investigations) Regulations ==
The Coroners (Investigations) Regulations 2013 is a statutory instrument of the United Kingdom. Regulations 28 and 29 of this statutory instrument provide powers for coroners to issue reports to prevent future deaths, also known as PFD reports.

It defines part of the mechanisms set up under the 2009 act.

== Amendment ==
Section 120 of the Act was amended by the Sentencing Guidelines (Pre-sentence Reports) Act 2025 to forbid the Sentencing Council from using personal characteristics in formulating sentencing guidelines concerning pre-sentence reports.

== See also ==
- Coroners Act
- Sentencing Council
- Prevention of future deaths report
