= Sentencing Council =

England and Wales public body

Agency overview
- Formed: April 2010; 16 years ago
- Preceding agencies: Sentencing Guidelines Council; Sentencing Advisory Panel
- Type: Advisory non-departmental public body
- Jurisdiction: England and Wales
- Headquarters: The Royal Courts of Justice, London, WC2A 2LL
- Employees: 22
- Annual budget: £1.9 million (2023/24)
- Agency executives: Dame Sue Carr, Lady Chief Justice and President; The Right Honourable Lady Justice Juliet May, Lord Justice of Appeal and Chair
- Parent department: Ministry of Justice
- Key document: Coroners and Justice Act 2009
- Website: www.sentencingcouncil.org.uk

Map
- England and Wales in the UK and Europe

The Sentencing Council for England and Wales is a non-departmental public body that is responsible for developing sentencing guidelines, monitoring the use of guidelines and assessing and reviewing a wide range of decisions relating to sentencing. It was established in April 2010 in consequence of the Coroners and Justice Act 2009, replacing the Sentencing Guidelines Council and the Sentencing Advisory Panel, its predecessor bodies.

== Functions ==
The Council aims to ensure a consistent approach to sentencing, demystify court processes and sentencing for victims and the public, and increase confidence in the criminal justice system.

=== Statutory role ===
The Coroners and Justice Act 2009 gives the Sentencing Council a statutory duty to prepare sentencing guidelines about the discharge of a court's duty under section 73 of the Sentencing Act 2020 (c. 17) (reduction in sentence for guilty plea), and sentencing guidelines about the application of any rule of law as to the totality of sentences. It is able to prepare sentencing guidelines about any other matter.

In preparing guidelines, the Council must have regard to:

- the sentences imposed by courts in England and Wales for offences
- the need to promote consistency in sentencing
- the impact of sentencing decisions on victims of offences
- the need to promote public confidence in the criminal justice system
- the cost of different sentences and their relative effectiveness in preventing re-offending
- the results of the Council's monitoring of the operation and effect of the guidelines

Judges and magistrates must follow the guidelines issued by the Sentencing Council "unless the Court is satisfied that it would be contrary to the interests of justice to do so".

It is also required to consider the impact of sentencing practice and the Government may ask it to look at the impact of policy and legislative proposals relating to sentencing.

=== Composition ===
The Council comprises eight members of the judiciary and six non-judicial members, all with expertise in the criminal justice system. All members of the Council are appointed by the Lord Chancellor and the Lady Chief Justice.

== History ==
The Sentencing Guidelines Council was a non-departmental public body of the United Kingdom government, created by s.167 of the Criminal Justice Act 2003. It gave authoritative guidance on sentencing to the courts of England and Wales. The Council was chaired by the Lord Chief Justice of England and Wales and comprised seven judicial members, appointed by the Lord Chancellor after consultation with the Lord Chief Justice and the Home Secretary, and four non-judicial members, appointed by the Home Secretary after consultation with the Lord Chancellor and Lord Chief Justice.

The seven judicial members had to include a circuit judge, a district judge (magistrates courts) and a lay magistrate. The non-judicial members had to be experienced in policing, criminal prosecution, criminal defence or victim welfare. In April 2010 it became the Sentencing Council (combining also the functions of the Sentencing Advisory Panel).

In March 2025 the Sentencing Council was forced to climb down from its "two-tier" guidelines which would have led to different sentences depending on age, sex and ethnicity. A row erupted in the House of Commons on 1 April over the Sentencing Guidelines (Pre-sentence Reports) Bill which resulted.

In May 2025 the Sentencing Council published a guideline for immigrants-to-be-sentenced.

=== 'Two-tier' guidance controversy ===
In 2025, the council issued new guidance in England and Wales, planned since 2022, by directing the courts to consider various protected characteristics when writing pre-sentence reports; these include ethnicity, gender, and whether the offender is a first-time offender or pregnant. The intention is to give an "insight into why an individual fell into crime, their risk of reoffending and the chances for rehabilitation outside of jail".

The justice secretary, Shabana Mahmood, criticised the changes and informed the council she would review its powers. Government ministers, opposition politicians, and critics characterised these changes as "two-tier" in nature.

The plans were suspended in March 2025 by the council, following the government planning to introduce a "Sentencing Guidelines (Pre-sentence Reports)" draft bill, which would act to make these changes unlawful.

=== Leadership ===
- Lord Justice Brian Leveson April 2009
- Lord Justice Colman Treacy 11 November 2013
- Lord Justice Tim Holroyde 1 August 2018
- Lord Justice William Davis 22 July 2022
- The Right Honourable Lady Justice Juliet May 6 October 2025

== Current Members ==
As of August 2026, the current members of the Sentencing Council are:

- The Right Honourable Lady Justice Juliet May, Chair
- His Honour Judge Simon Drew KC
- The Right Honourable Lord Justice Andrew Edis
- Tim De Meyer
- The Honourable Mr Justice Garnham
- Professor Jessica Jacobson
- Rokaiya Khan
- Jo King JP
- Stephen Parkinson
- Her Honour Judge Amanda Rippon
- Johanna Robinson
- The Honourable Mr Justice Mark Wall
- Richard Wright KC

== See also ==
- Judicial College
- Crown Prosecution Service
- Criminal Cases Review Commission
- His Majesty's Chief Inspector of Prisons
- HM Inspectorate of Probation
- Independent custody visitor
- Parole Board (England and Wales)
- Police and crime commissioner
- Sentencing Code
- Victims' Commissioner
