= Prevention of future deaths report =

Type of report made by coroners in the United Kingdom

A prevention of future deaths report (also known as a regulation 28 report or PFD report) is a report made by a coroner in the England and Wales to relevant authorities to attempt to prevent future deaths from causes uncovered during an inquest. The powers relevant to these reports were created by schedule 5, paragraph 7 of the Coroners and Justice Act 2009 and regulations 28 and 29 of the Coroners (Investigations) Regulations 2013 (SI 2013/1629).

The government has commissioned a report about the relevance of PFDs to suicide prevention.

As of 1 September 2025, a total of 5,891 reports have been produced.

== See also ==
- Inquests in England and Wales
