= Bromford Tunnel =

Twin-bore tunnel for HS2 railway

- Interactive map of Bromford Tunnel

Overview
- Line: High Speed 2
- Location: United Kingdom (Warwickshire, West Midlands)
- Coordinates: 52.5133°N 1.7524°W (east portal): 52.5038°N 1.8344°W (west portal)
- Status: Under construction
- Crosses: M6 motorway River Tame; Park Hall Nature Reserve
- Start: Water Orton, North Warwickshire
- End: Washwood Heath, Birmingham

Operation
- Work began: July 2023 (boring)
- Constructed: 22 November 2021 – present
- Traffic: High-speed passenger trains

Technical
- Length: 5.8 km (3.6 miles)
- No. of tracks: 2 single-track tunnels
- Track gauge: 1,435 mm (4 ft 8 1/2 in) standard gauge
- Electrified: 25 kV 50 Hz AC
- Operating speed: 230 km/h (145 mph)
- Width: 7.75 metres (25.4 ft) (internal)
- Cross passages: 13

Bromford Tunnel is a high-speed railway tunnel in North Warwickshire and Birmingham, England that will serve to bring the High Speed 2 rail line into Birmingham upon completion.

The 5.8 km (3.6 miles) twin-bore tunnels are situated between Water Orton and Washwood Heath. The tunnels were excavated between July 2023 and October 2025.

== History ==
The contract to build the tunnel, as part of the wider N1 and N2 lots on the HS2 programme, was awarded to the Balfour Beatty Vinci JV on 1 April 2020, valued at c. £5 billion. This followed them being named by HS2 as part of the intention to award in July 2017.

The route was initially envisioned in the High Speed Rail (London - West Midlands) Act 2017 to be a tunnel, 2.86 km (1.78 miles) long (in Work No. 3/203) and partly on viaduct, less than 30 m (98 ft), in length (in Work No. 3/157).

On 20 January 2022, HS2 Ltd made a Transport and Works Act Order application to remove the words "partly on viaduct" in the description of the works, in a bid to extend the tunnel by 3.1 km (1.9 miles) instead. This decision was claimed to reduce land take, minimise impacts on the Park Hall Nature Reserve, avoid the need to redirect the River Tame, and reduce construction traffic.

The plans were refused by North Warwickshire Borough Council and subsequently dismissed on appeal by Grahame Gould, an inspector of the Planning Inspectorate in March 2023. The Secretary of State for Levelling Up, Housing and Communities and Secretary of State for Transport recovered the appeal to these plans and Schedule 17 approval was granted on 14 May 2024. The council applied for a judicial review, which was heard over three days in the High Court in February 2025 by Justice Dove. The council claimed that HS2 did not have the correct authorisation to extend the tunnel; however, the case was dismissed on all grounds on 20 May 2025. As of 2025, North Warwickshire Borough Council had spent £116,740 of taxpayer money on the case. The council subsequently appealed to the Court of Appeal. On 30 June 2026, the court allowed the appeal in part, holding that the extension was authorised by the High Speed Rail (London–West Midlands) Act 2017 but that the works did not benefit from its deemed planning permission as they were not covered by the required environmental assessment. As the works were largely complete, the council sought declaratory relief rather than a quashing order, and the court declared that the deemed planning permission did not apply.

The two Herrenknecht tunnel boring machines (TBMs) used to construct the tunnel were named Mary Ann, after Mary Ann Evans (with the pen name, George Eliot) and Elizabeth, after Elizabeth Cadbury. Most of the second TBM to be delivered, Elizabeth, was repurposed from TBM Dorothy used to construct the Long Itchington Wood tunnel, with a new outer cutter-head and shield ordered.

== Design ==
The tunnel passes underneath the Park Hall Nature Reserve, River Tame, and M6 motorway, and runs up to 40 m (131 ft) underground.

The tunnel will have 13 cross-passages, spaced every 500 m (1,640 ft), and 5.5 m (18.0 ft) wide, as well as 8 adits.

The western portal at Washwood Heath sits next to the Washwood Heath depot and Network Integrated Control Centre, where trains will be maintained and stored and where operational control of the line will be based.

The eastern portal at Water Orton will have a porous portal, likely in the form of a perforated concrete structure, to mitigate tunnel boom associated with trains travelling at 230 km/h (145 mph).

The decision to extend the tunnel to over 3 km resulted in the need for an intermediate shaft to allow for adequate airflow. The tunnel will have a 47 m (154 ft) deep, 18.6 m (61 ft) diameter ventilation shaft at Castle Vale, around the halfway point of the tunnel. The headhouse, located in the Castle Bromwich Business Park, will have pre-cast concrete walls with an overlaid "flexi-brick" lattice facade made of ceramic tiles and a 'green roof'.

== Construction ==
Tunnelling and excavation was primarily through Mercia Mudstone, at mostly BGS grade II weathering. The groundwater level is, at most, 30 metres (98 ft) above the tunnels' roof.

The variable pressure TBMs used to construct the tunnel have a cutter-head diameter of 8.62 m (28.3 ft), with a length of 125 m (410 ft) and weigh approximately 1,600 tonnes each. They were both expected to take 16 months to complete the tunnel, employing around 450 people.

The TBM Mary Ann started boring in July 2023 from an underground box structure, measuring 160 m × 30 m × 15 m (525 ft × 98 ft × 49 ft), at the eastern portal in Water Orton, towards the 22 m (72 ft) deep portal at Washwood Heath. This was followed by TBM Elizabeth in March 2024.

A total of 40,628 concrete segments, weighing up to 7 tonnes each, produced by the joint venture's pre-cast concrete factory in Avonmouth, Bristol, were used to support the tunnels. These formed 5,804 rings, weighing 49 tonnes each. Forty percent of the cement used was replaced with ground granulated blast-furnace slag (GGBS), claimed to reduce the overall carbon footprint involved. The TBMs excavated 1.8 million tonnes of material, which was treated by the on-site slurry treatment plant for use on HS2's delta junction, south of Water Orton, and conveyed on dedicated haul roads.

Mary Ann broke through on 9 May 2025, after advancing at a peak of 30 m (98 ft) per day, while Elizabeth broke through on 13 October 2025.

== See also ==
- Washwood Heath depot
- Birmingham Curzon Street railway station
