= Euston Tunnel =

Twin-bore tunnel for HS2 railway

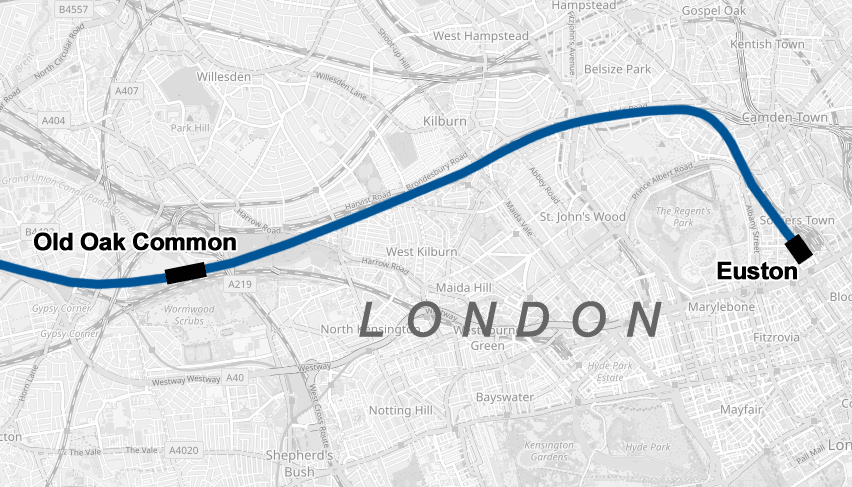
- HS2 route out of Euston via Old Oak Common
- Interactive map of Euston Tunnel

Overview
- Coordinates: 51.537°N 0.192°W
- Status: Under construction
- System: High Speed 2
- Crosses: West London
- Start: Euston railway station
- End: Old Oak Common railway station

Operation
- Work began: 27 January 2026 (boring)
- Traffic: High-speed passenger trains

Technical
- Length: 7.2 kilometres (4.5 mi)
- No. of tracks: 2 single-track tunnels
- Track gauge: 1,435 mm (4 ft 8 1/2 in)
- Electrified: 25 kV 50 Hz AC
- Operating speed: 120 km/h (75 mph)
- Width: 7.55 metres (24.8 ft) (internal)
- Grade: −3.40% to +3.50%
- Cross passages: 18

Euston Tunnel is a tunnel currently under construction in London that will carry the High Speed 2 (HS2) railway between Euston railway station and Old Oak Common railway station.

Work to prepare the site for construction was undertaken in the late 2010s, such as the clearance of the old carriage sheds near Euston station in 2018. A legal challenge to the tunnel's design was defeated in mid-2020. During October 2020, HS2 Ltd ordered the two tunnel boring machines (TBMs) from Herrenknecht that will excavate the tunnel. Excavation of the tunnels began on 27 January 2026.

== History ==
To bring the HS2 high speed line into London, it was decided that a series of twin-bore tunnels underneath the city would be the most practical approach. These will have a combined total of 42 kilometres (26 mi), roughly equivalent in length to those built for the Crossrail programme. Responsibility for the construction of the section between central London and the M25 has been assigned to HS2's main works contractor, Skanska Costain STRABAG JV. In total, it has been envisaged that ten tunnel boring machines (TBMs) will be used to bore the 102 kilometres (63 mi) of tunnelling along the HS2 route between the West Midlands and London.

=== Preparatory works ===
During 2018, the disused Euston Downside Carriage Maintenance Depot, close to Euston railway station, was demolished in order to clear space for the future construction work; the tunnel portal of the future Euston Tunnel is to be present at this location.

During 2019, a legal challenge to the design of Euston Tunnel was launched by a local resident, alleging failures to address safety concerns; in June 2020, the High Court dismissed the challenge as "impossible to accept".

During October 2020, HS2 Ltd signed a contract with the manufacturing group Herrenknecht to build and supply the two TBMs for Euston Tunnel. These are to be custom-designed to suit the local geology, which ground surveys indicated to consist largely of London Clay and chalk, with which the tunnels are to be bored through. Delivery of the two TBMs was originally scheduled to take place sometime in late 2021.

Between August 2021 and December 2033, a portion of London Zoo's car park is to be temporarily borrowed for use by construction vehicles while Euston Tunnel is being built.

=== Hiatus ===
Work was paused in 2023, and was later announced that the line would not be extended into Euston without private funding. The two TBMs needed for the tunnels were lowered into the Old Oak Common station site in summer 2024, awaiting approval for the tunnels, to allow work on the rest of the station to progress.

In the Autumn 2024 budget, funding commitments to complete the tunnelling were made, with a view for preparatory work to be completed by the end of the year and for tunnelling to begin from 2025. In February 2025, work on the tunnels was again paused with funding diverted to the section from Old Oak Common to Birmingham Curzon Street.

== Design ==
The tunnel will be 7.2 kilometres (4.5 mi) long, with an internal diameter of 7.55 m (24.8 ft). At its deepest point, the tunnel will run 66 m (217 ft) below ground. The tunnel will have 18 cross-passages.

The tunnel will have two intermediate ventilation shafts with associated headhouses, namely Adelaide Road Vent Shaft, in Swiss Cottage, and Canterbury Road Vent Shaft, in Kilburn.

The Euston Portal headhouse will also serve to provide ventilation and emergency access, featuring Staffordshire blue brickwork, dark metal panels, a noise screen, and a green roof. About 400 m to the north, a second Euston Cavern headhouse will provide additional emergency access. A third headhouse that had been planned for this area has since been removed from the scheme. Unlike other HS2 tunnels, the up and down lines are at different levels, and the headhouses provide multiple points of access.

== Construction ==
Euston Tunnel will be bored using tunnel boring machines launched from the western entrance, near Old Oak Common railway station.

The pre-cast concrete sections lining the tunnel were manufactured by Strabag at their factory in Hartlepool. 48,294 concrete ring segments will be used to form 8,049 rings to line the tunnels and over 1.5 million tonnes of material will be removed during construction. The use of 3D printing technology was trialled to reduce the amount of concrete used in Euston Tunnel in comparison to traditional methods.

In advance of the tunnel's boring, a smaller 853 m (2,799 ft) long logistics tunnel was bored using a separate smaller TBM that will facilitate access between the primary construction compound at Atlas Road and Old Oak Common Station, the launch site for the Northolt East and Euston TBMs, through which construction materials such as the precast concrete lining segments will be brought into the site and spoil removed. Boring on the Atlas Road Logistics tunnel began with the launch of TBM Lydia (formerly TBM Ellie on the Crossrail project before being refurbished for HS2 by Herrenknecht) on 12 April 2023, and finished on 23 January 2024. Excavated material will be removed via a conveyor belt installed within the Atlas Road Logistics tunnel, and transported to Willesden Euro Terminal for re-use in Kent, Cambridgeshire and Rugby.

Two 198 m (650 ft) long TBMs supplied by Herrenknecht will be used to bore the tunnels, with a cutterhead diameter of 8.53 m (28.0 ft) and weighing 1,624 tonnes (1,598 long tons) each. They are named Karen after Karen Harrison, the UK's first female train driver, and Madeline after Madeline Nobbs, former president of the Women’s Engineering Society.

The TBMs are expected to take 18 months to excavate the tunnels and are planned to reach the Euston cavern by June 2027. Madeline began excavation of the upline tunnel from Old Oak Common station on 27 January 2026, and will advance at an average speed of 16 m (52 ft) per day. The launch was attended by the Chief Secretary to the Prime Minister, Darren Jones, and the Rail Minister, Lord Hendy. Karen began excavation of the downline tunnel on 16 March 2026, in a ceremony attended by two female train drivers from Avanti West Coast.
