= High Speed Rail (Preparation) Act 2013 =

- Act of Parliament
- Parliament of the United Kingdom
- Long title: An Act to make provision authorising expenditure in preparation for a high speed railway transport network.
- Citation: 2013 c. 31
- Introduced by: Patrick McLoughlin; Secretary of State for Transport (Commons); Baroness Kramer (Lords)
- Territorial extent: England and Wales and Scotland

Dates
- Royal assent: 21 November 2013
Other legislation
Relates to	High Speed Rail (London - West Midlands) Act 2017

History of passage through Parliament

Text of statute as originally enacted

Revised text of statute as amended

The High Speed Rail (Preparation) Act 2013 (c. 31) is an act of Parliament in the United Kingdom which allows expenditure on essential preparatory work, including construction design, on Phase One and Phase Two of HS2 and all future phases of a high speed rail network. The act was the first stage in constructing High Speed 2.

The hybrid bill enabling Phase One of the project received royal assent on 3 February 2017.

== Provisions ==
The act allows for the funding of the preparatory work needed before construction of HS2 began. This included ecological surveys and ground investigations.

== Reception ==
The legislation was criticised by Labour Party MP Frank Dobson due to the impact HS2 would have on his constituency: Holborn and St Pancras. The Labour Party frontbench supported the legislation.
