= High Speed Rail (West Midlands - Crewe) Act 2021 =

Act of the Parliament of the United Kingdom

High Speed Rail (West Midlands - Crewe) Act 2021 (Note: Section 64(2).)
- Act of Parliament
- Parliament of the United Kingdom
- Long title: An Act to make provision for a railway between a junction with Phase One of High Speed 2, near Fradley Wood in Staffordshire, and a junction with the West Coast Main Line near Crewe in Cheshire; and for connected purposes.
- Citation: 2021 c. 2\
- Introduced by: Andrew Stephenson, Minister of State for Transport (Commons); Baroness Vere, Parliamentary Under-Secretary of State for Transport (Lords)
- Territorial extent: United Kingdom

Dates
- Royal assent: 11 February 2021
- Commencement: 11 February 2021 (Note: Section 64(1).)
Other legislation
Amends	High Speed Rail (London - West Midlands) Act 2017
Amended by	Secretaries of State for Energy Security and Net Zero, for Science, Innovation and Technology, for Business and Trade, and for Culture, Media and Sport and the Transfer of Functions (National Security and Investment Act 2021 etc) Order 2023; Transfer of Functions (Secretary of State for Housing, Communities and Local Government) Order 2024

Status: Amended

History of passage through Parliament

Text of statute as originally enacted

Revised text of statute as amended

The High Speed Rail (West Midlands - Crewe) Act 2021 (c. 2) is an act of the Parliament of the United Kingdom.

== Passage ==
The act received royal assent on 11 February 2021.

== Provisions ==
The act gave the legislative framework for the first stage of High Speed 2 between the West Midlands and Crewe, Cheshire. This stage was known as "Phase 2a".

== Reception ==
The act was criticised by Cheshire East Council for, in their view, not containing adequate upgrades to Crewe railway station.

== Further developments ==
The powers under the act expired on 11 February 2026.
