= Wendover Dean Viaduct =

- Coordinates: 51.7371°N 0.7228°W
- OS grid reference: SP882050
- Carries: High Speed 2
- Locale: Wendover

Characteristics
- Total length: 450 m (1,480 ft)
- Width: 14 m (46 ft)
- Height: 18 m (59 ft)
- No. of spans: 10

Rail characteristics
- No. of tracks: 2
- Track gauge: 1,435 mm (4 ft 8 1/2 in)
- Electrified: 25 kV 50 Hz AC

History
- Architect: Moxon Architects
- Designer: ASC (Arcadis, Setec and COWI)
- Constructed by: EKFB (Eiffage, Kier, Ferrovial, BAM Nuttall)

Location
- Interactive map of Wendover Dean Viaduct

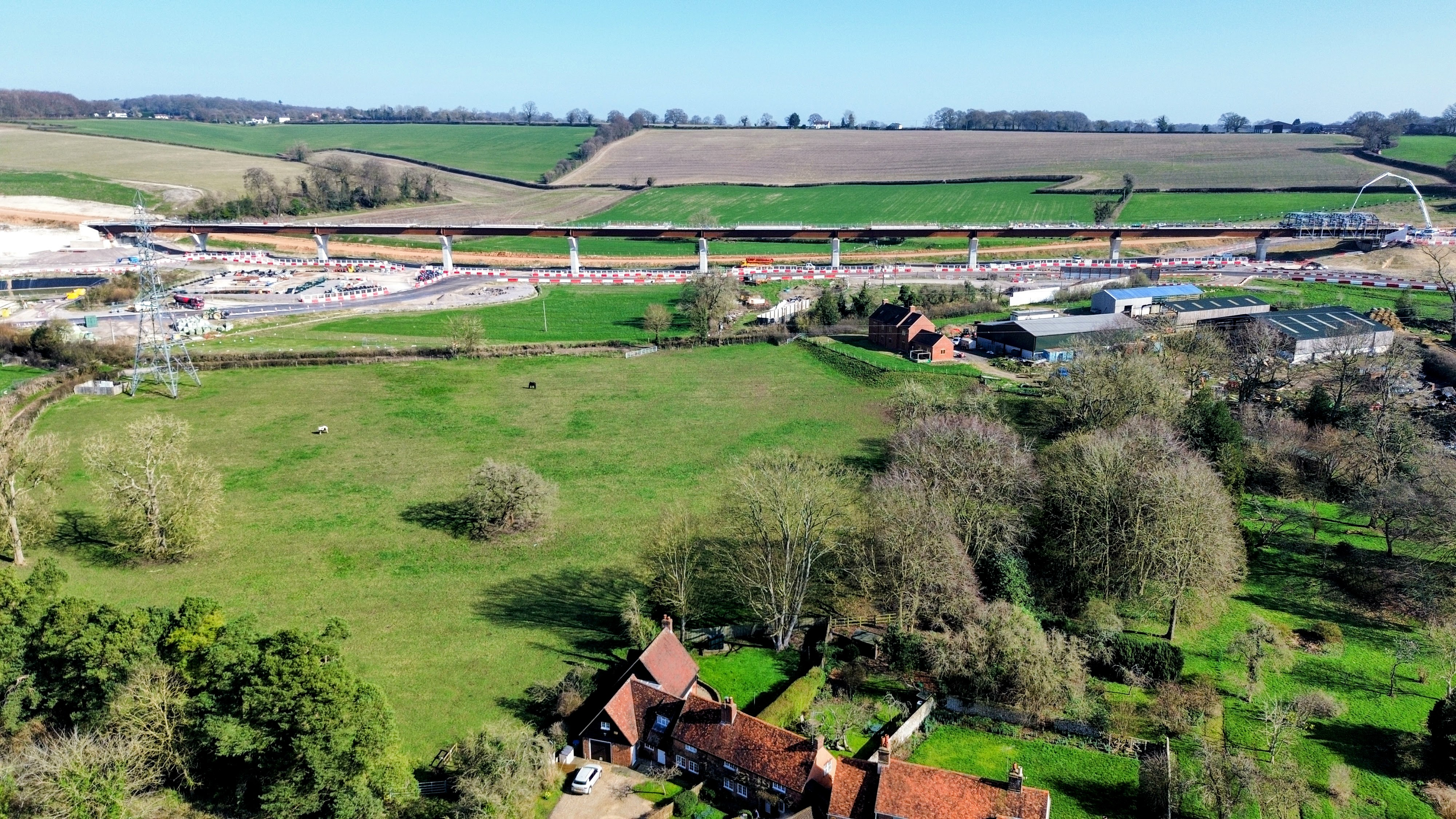
HS2 Wendover Dean Viaduct, construction Feb 2026

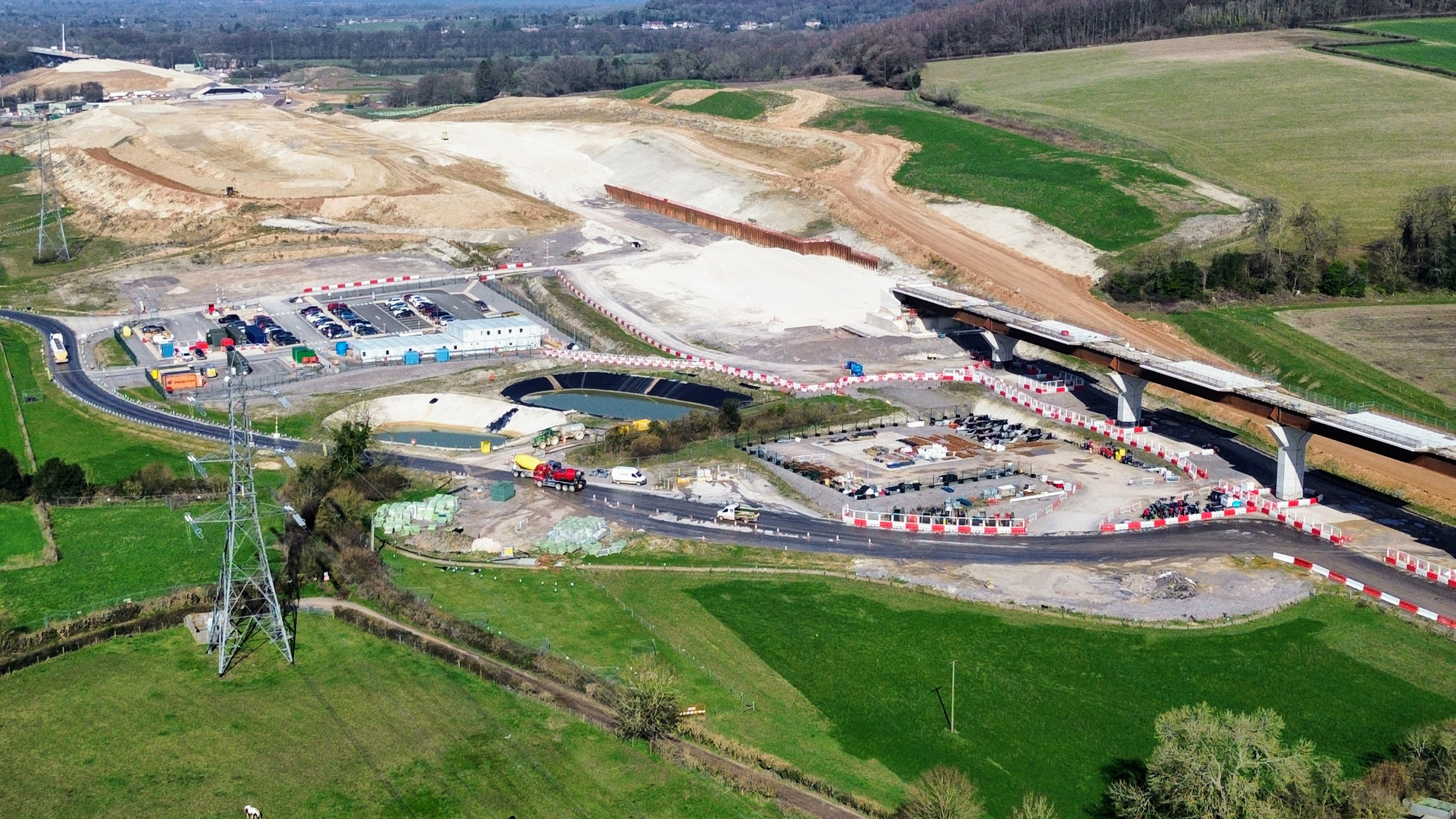
HS2 Wendover Dean Viaduct, North and compound Feb 2026.

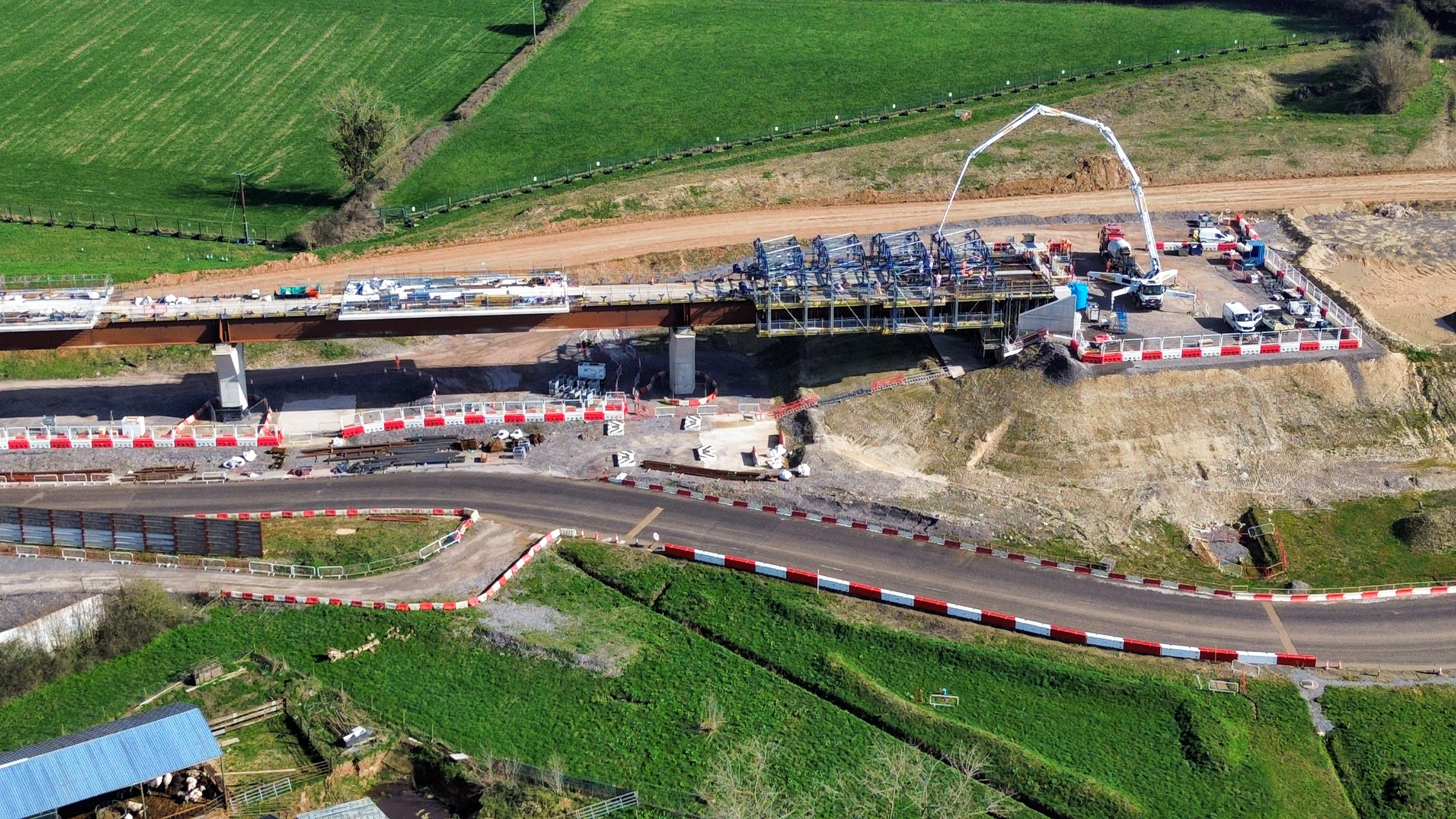
HS2 Wendover Dean Viaduct, South embankment construction Feb 2026.

The Wendover Dean Viaduct is a railway viaduct currently under construction that will carry the High Speed 2 (HS2) railway line across farmland between Wendover and Great Missenden, Buckinghamshire, England.

Approval for the viaduct's construction was issued in 2017 via the High Speed Rail (London - West Midlands) Act 2017; its design was publicly revealed two years later. In June 2021, Buckinghamshire Council also approved plans for the viaduct. Design revisions centred around improving its aesthetics and minimising its impact on the countryside. Construction of the main deck took place between late 2021 and 2024, although high speed trains will not traverse the structure until several years after this point.

== History ==
Authorisation to construct the Wendover Dean Viaduct was granted, along with the rest of the first phase of HS2, by the High Speed Rail (London - West Midlands) Act 2017. The near-finalised designs of both the Wendover Dean Viaduct and the neighbouring Small Dean Viaduct was revealed to the public on 1 November 2019. It was produced by the ASC joint venture between Arcadis, Setec, COWI, and Moxon Architects.

The contractor appointed to construct the viaduct is the EKFB consortium, comprising Eiffage, Kier, Ferrovial and BAM Nuttall; the viaduct is to be one of the most substantial individual civil engineering works along the 80 km (50 miles) section between the Chiltern tunnel and Long Itchington Wood that EKFB is to build. In late 2019, it was stated that its construction was set to commence during 2021, and the viaduct's completion was scheduled to occur during 2024.

On 10 June 2021, Buckinghamshire Council issued its formal approval of the submitted plans for the viaduct, despite its official position of opposing HS2 in general; Councillor Peter Martin, Buckinghamshire Council’s Deputy Cabinet Member for HS2 observed that planning permission had already been granted irrespectively under the High Speed Rail act in 2017. Prior to its approval, the council held talks with HS2 Ltd, during which the latter gave assurances related to the noise levels that will be produced by the operational viaduct, along with numerous refinements to the design to minimise its impact upon the local community.

== Design ==
The viaduct is to be built to the east of the A413 road, between the settlements of Wendover and Great Missenden, Buckinghamshire. Possessing an approximate length of 450 m (1,480 ft), it will cross above Durham Farm, a portion of Bowood Lane (which is to be partially realigned) and a private access road to Upper Wendover Dean Farm. The structure has a total of ten spans, which carry a deck consisting of two separate layers of reinforced concrete along with a pair of steel girders. This double composite design has been claimed by the architect firm to be the first use of such an approach in Britain, although such techniques have been used before for France's TGV high speed network. A total of 1,400 tonnes of weathering steel will be used, featuring an intentionally dark russet finish for a pleasing visual effect, reportedly making the structure appear to be thinner. The beams will be manufactured and installed by Eiffage Métal.

The structure has been designed with a highly sleek design, reducing weight, material, and cost alike wherever reasonable to do so. The design team also sought this sleek approach for its visual properties, aiming to minimise its obtrusiveness upon the neighbouring countryside. Following discussions with Buckinghamshire Council during the planning stages, several minor revisions to enhance the viaduct's aesthetic qualities, amongst other attributes, were made. These include the adoption of a textured exterior for neighbouring barriers. The viaduct's supports were one area of particular refinement, changes were made with the purpose of minimising its long term land usage as well as hedgerow loss. These supporting piers will vary in height across the length of the structure, the tallest of which will be 14 m (46 ft). The piers will be pre-cast offsite in sections before being transported to their final locations via road vehicles.

== Construction ==
Foundation laying work started in July 2022.

Following creation of the viaduct concrete piers, the deck was assembled and slid out over the piers in three stages to cover the overall 450 m (1,480 ft) length:

- First 90 m (300 ft) in January 2024
- Next 180 m (590 ft) in May 2024
- Final 180 m in August 2024
