= Turweston Green Bridge =

- Coordinates: 52.0337°N 1.1189°W
- Crosses: High Speed 2

Characteristics
- Width: 99 metres (325 ft)

History
- Construction start: 2024
- Construction end: 2026

Location
- Interactive map of Turweston Green Bridge

Turweston Green Bridge is a bridge near Turweston. When opened, it will carry a local road over the High Speed 2 railway line but at 99 metres (325 ft) wide it is also designed to be a wildlife crossing.

Vertical construction began in late 2024. It was completed in April 2026.

The bridge has 36 steel beams and a bed of pre-cast concrete slabs.
