= Small Dean Viaduct =

- Coordinates: 51.7500°N 0.7368°W
- Carries: High Speed 2
- Crosses: A413 road
- Locale: Wendover

Characteristics
- Total length: 345 m (1,132 ft)
- No. of spans: 6

Rail characteristics
- No. of tracks: 2
- Track gauge: 1,435 mm (4 ft 8 1/2 in)
- Electrified: 25 kV 50 Hz AC

History
- Architect: Moxon Architects
- Designer: ASC (Arcadis, Setec and COWI)
- Constructed by: EKFB (Eiffage, Kier, Ferrovial, BAM Nuttall)

Small Dean Viaduct is a viaduct currently under construction in Buckinghamshire which will carry the High Speed 2 railway line.

Approval for the viaduct was granted by Buckinghamshire Council in April 2023.

The viaduct is 345 metres (1,132 feet) long and will pass over the A413 road which will be realigned. A shared-use path will also be provided.

The viaduct will have a low profile with the underside of the viaduct 6 metres (20 feet) above the road surface below. It will be supported by five Y-shaped piers and girders made from weathering steel.
