= High Speed Rail (Crewe - Manchester) Bill =

Proposed United Kingdom legislation

- Bill
- Parliament of the United Kingdom
- Long title: A Bill to make provision for a railway between a junction with Phase 2a of High Speed 2 south of Crewe in Cheshire and Manchester Piccadilly Station; for a railway between Hoo Green in Cheshire and a junction with the West Coast Main Line at Bamfurlong, south of Wigan; and for connected purposes.
- Introduced by: Grant Shapps, Secretary of State for Transport; Mark Harper, Secretary of State for Transport (Commons)

Status: Not passed

History of passage through Parliament

The High Speed Rail (Crewe - Manchester) Bill was a proposed act of the Parliament of the United Kingdom. It was introduced as a Hybrid Bill by Grant Shapps (Secretary of State for Transport) in January 2022.

The bill's original aim was to authorise rail works for High Speed 2 Phase Two between Crewe and Manchester. It was paused under the Sunak ministry, pending the review into Phase 2 following the Government's cancellation of Phase 2 in 2023.

The bill was re-introduced in the 2024-2025 session by Louise Haigh (Secretary of State for Transport), on 25 July 2024, with the intention of repurposing it to instead provide powers to construct other rail lines in the north of England. It did not pass and was reintroduced again in the 2026-2027 session by Haigh's successor Heidi Alexander.
