= Marston Box Rail Bridge =

- Coordinates: 52.5475°N 1.7181°W
- Carries: High Speed 2
- Crosses: M42 motorway

Marston Box Rail Bridge is a railway bridge currently under construction in the United Kingdom. Once complete, it will carry High Speed 2 over the M42 motorway.

== History ==
In November 2021, it was announced that the bridge would be installed using the box slide method to minimise disruption to the motorway.

The M42 was closed between junctions nine and ten from 24 December to 31 December 2021 for preparatory works.

In December 2022 the bridge deck was slid 165 metres (541 feet) into place over a period of forty hours. To allow the work to take place the southbound carriageway was closed on 23 December and the northbound carriageway was closed on 24 December. Both directions were reopened on 1 January 2023, two days ahead of schedule.
