= Mark Wild =

British engineer (born 1965)

Mark Wild OBE
- Born: 1965 (age 60–61); Durham, England
- Occupation: Engineer
- Title: CEO of HS2 Ltd

Mark Wild OBE (born 1965) is a British engineer who has been the chief executive of HS2 Ltd since December 2024. He was previously the chief executive of Crossrail from 2018 to 2022, culminating in its opening as the Elizabeth Line.

== Early life ==
Wild was born in Durham, England in 1965, the son of a coal miner.

He studied electrical engineering at Newcastle Polytechnic and also has an MBA from Leeds University. Wild is a Chartered Electrical Engineer and a Member of the Institute of Engineering and Technology.

He is a Fellow of the Royal Academy of Engineering.

== Career ==
=== HS2 ===
In December 2024, Wild was appointed as chief executive of HS2 Limited. He acknowledged that the project was in a 'very serious situation', and began an assessment of the program in its current state. Wild announced a reset to the project, which would attempt to establish a productivity baseline and more accurately predict the final cost of the project. Using data from the reset, Transport Secretary Heidi Alexander announced in May 2026 that the projected cost of HS2 was between £87.7 billion and £102.7 billion.

== Personal life ==
Wild was appointed OBE in the 2023 New Year Honours for services to public transport.
