= Aston Church Road Overbridge =

- Coordinates: 52.4983°N 1.8571°W
- Carries: Aston Church Road
- Crosses: High Speed 2; Cross Country Route
- Locale: Birmingham, England

Aston Church Road Overbridge is a road bridge in Birmingham, England.

== Background ==
The existing Aston Court Overbridge is not long enough to allow High Speed 2 to pass underneath. As part of the project, it will be demolished and replaced with a new structure.

== History ==
=== Planning ===
The initial design for the bridge was revealed to the public in 2021. A revised design was released in November 2022 with a wider walkway and altered lighting. The bridge was given planning permission in September 2023.

=== Construction ===
Preparatory works began in 2022. The bridge was constructed in advance. On 14 August 2024 it was moved into place.
