= Willesden Logistics Hub =

Railway station

General information
- Location: Willesden; Brent; England
- Coordinates: 51°31′59.71″N 0°15′6.51″W

Other information
- Status: Operational

History
- Opened: 7 June 1994
Location

Willesden Logistics Hub is a freight railway station situated adjacent to the West Coast Main Line in Willesden, England.

== History ==
The site was rebuilt to handle container freight through the Channel Tunnel and was known as Willesden Euro Terminal, one of nine such facilities constructed. Prior to this, it was already in use as a freight handling yard. The first train departed for the tunnel on 27 June 1994. However, the site did not see as much use as hoped due to declining levels of freight trains using the Channel Tunnel. As a result, the customs facilities were de-staffed, and eventually the site stopped handling international trains. It continued to be used for domestic railfreight purposes.

The site was identified by High Speed 2 (HS2) as a candidate for use as a construction compound. Work started in 2018 to dismantle the disused cranes at the site. This was completed in March 2019.

The first train ran from the refurbished facility on 2 July 2021.

== Usage ==
The facility is expected to handle up to eight freight trains per day during the construction of HS2.
