= Park Hall Nature Reserve =

Nature reserve in Birmingham, England

Coordinates: 52°30′50″N 1°46′23″W

Park Hall was a Wildlife Trust nature reserve in Birmingham, England, until it was taken possession of by HS2.

The main pool at Park Hall.

The 40-hectare (100-acre) site lies between the M6 motorway and Castle Vale in the east of Birmingham. It comprises flood plain grassland, wetland and pools along the former route of the River Tame and part of the realigned river which runs along its northern boundary, together with ancient woodland and other habitats on the scarp slopes to the south.

During spring impressive displays of bluebells, ramsons, yellow archangel and numerous other plants can be seen in the woodlands, while in the farm ponds amphibians including great crested newt, common toad and frog begin to breed. As the seasons move along the grasslands and wetlands come into their own, with colourful floral displays and abundant butterflies and dragonflies. Summer breeding birds include reed bunting, teal, swan and buzzard, while in the evenings bats forage on moths and other insects. The woodlands take on a different character in autumn, with fungi taking the place of the flowers among the changing colours of the canopy.

The reserve lies on the proposed route of HS2.
