= Euston Downside Carriage Maintenance Depot =

Former railway maintenance depot in Camden, London

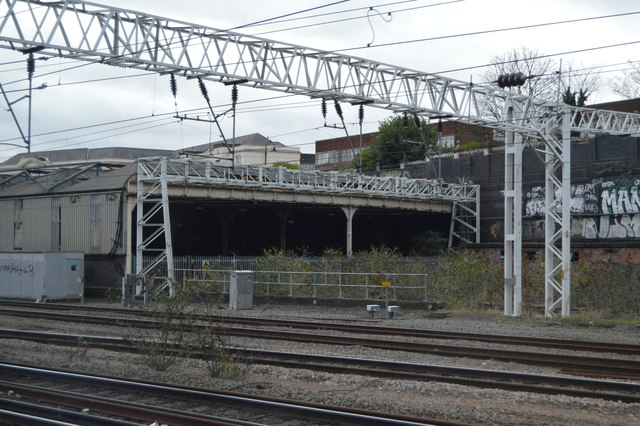
- The disused depot seen from the main line in 2014
- Interactive map of Euston Downside Carriage Maintenance Depot

Location
- Location: Camden, London
- Coordinates: 51°31′59″N 0°8′34″W
- OS grid: TQ288833

Characteristics
- Owner: Network Rail
- Depot code: EN (1973 -)
- Type: Diesel

History
- Opened: 1905
- Closed: 2004

Euston Downside Carriage Maintenance Depot was a carriage maintenance depot located in Camden, London, England. The depot was situated on the west side of the West Coast Main Line to the north of London Euston station.

== History ==
The depot, which was used to maintain railway carriages for the London, Midland and Scottish Railway and, after nationalisation, for British Railways, was completed in 1905. Over time the focus of the maintenance activities at the depot changed from passenger carriages to freight locomotives. In 1995, a consortium known as North and South Railways purchased the parcels division of British Rail and, with it, the Euston Downside Carriage Maintenance Depot. North and South Railways became English, Welsh & Scottish Railway and was subsequently acquired by Deutsche Bahn becoming DB Cargo UK. The depot subsequently became known as the "DB Cargo Shed".

After locomotive-hauled trains were replaced by Pendolinos in 2002 and the Royal Mail traffic was transferred to the roads in 2003, the depot became obsolete and closed in 2004.

In 2018 the depot was demolished in advance of the start of tunnelling work for the High Speed 2 Euston approach tunnels and the extension of Granby Terrace Bridge.

== Bibliography ==
- Webster, Neil; Greengrass, Robert; Greaves, Simon (1987). British Rail Depot Directory. Metro Enterprises Ltd. ISBN 9780947773076. OCLC 20420397.
