= High Speed Rail (London - West Midlands) Act 2017 =

High Speed Rail (London – West Midlands) Act 2017
- Act of Parliament
- Parliament of the United Kingdom
- Long title: An Act to make provision for a railway between Euston in London and a junction with the West Coast Main Line at Handsacre in Staffordshire, with a spur from Water Orton in Warwickshire to Curzon Street in Birmingham; and for connected purposes.
- Citation: 2017 c. 7
- Territorial extent: England and Wales and Scotland

Dates
- Royal assent: 23 February 2017

Other legislation
- Relates to: High Speed Rail (Preparation) Act 2013

History of passage through Parliament

Text of statute as originally enacted

The High Speed Rail (London – West Midlands) Act 2017 (c. 7) is an act of Parliament in the United Kingdom in connection with the high-speed railway, High Speed 2.

== Provisions ==
The act authorised the construction of Phase One of High Speed 2, between London and Birmingham. The act was introduced to Parliament as a hybrid bill on 25 November 2013, and received royal assent on 23 February 2017.

== Committee ==
The High Speed Rail (London – West Midlands) Bill Select Committee was a select committee of the House of Lords. The committee was established in 2016 with a remit to provide persons and bodies directly affected by the Act the opportunity to object to specific provisions of the bill.

=== Membership ===
At 31 March 2019, the members of the committee were as follows:

Member	Party
Rt. Hon. Lord Walker of Gestingthorpe PC	Crossbench
Rt. Hon. Lord Brabazon of Tara PC DL	Conservative
Lord Elder	Labour
Rt. Hon. Lord Freeman PC	Conservative
Rt. Hon. Lord Jones of Cheltenham	Liberal Democrat
Rt. Hon. Baroness O'Cathain OBE	Conservative
Lord Young of Norwood Green	Labour

== Reception ==
The legislation was supported by Shadow Secretary of State for Transport and Labour MP Mary Creagh, who said that the party "had had another look" to check that the project would provide value for money.
