= Powers of the police in Scotland =

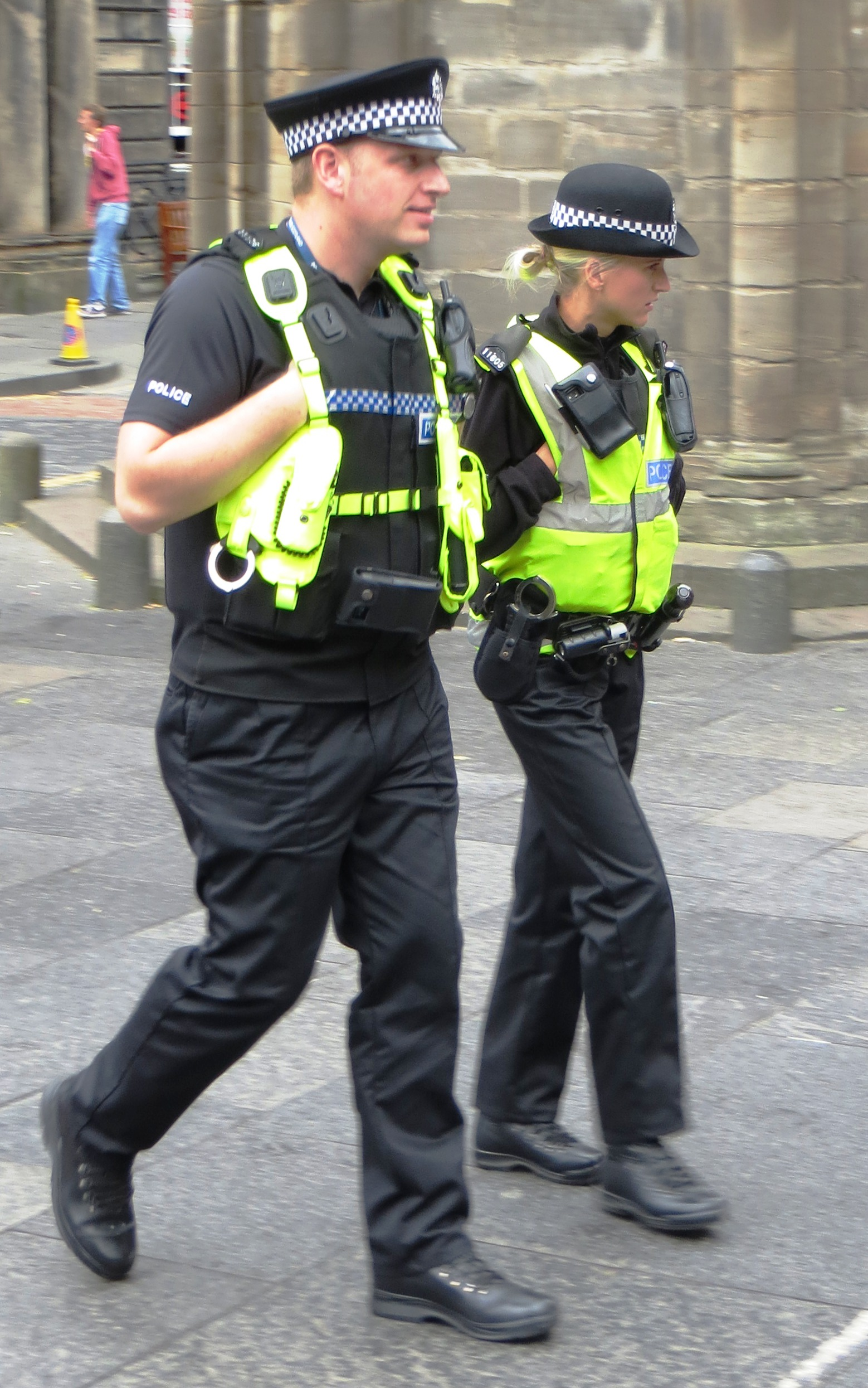
Police officers wearing uniform in Edinburgh

The powers of the police in Scotland, as with much of Scots law, are based on mixed elements of statute law and common law.

== Powers of arrest ==
Powers of arrest in Scotland are derived from the Criminal Justice (Scotland) Act 2016. The purpose of an arrest is to bring a person who is suspected of having committed an offence punishable by imprisonment to justice, or to prevent a person who has committed an offence from continuing to commit that offence or from obstructing the course of justice in any way. Prior to the Criminal Justice (Scotland) Act 2016, powers of arrest and detention in Scotland were derived from common law and the Criminal Procedure (Scotland) Act 1995. The now defunct powers of arrest under common law and statutory detention were noted by Lord Carloway in the Carloway Review as being "a peculiar, if not unique, feature of modern Scots criminal procedure". The Criminal Justice (Scotland) Act 2016 was introduced in order to "modernise and enhance the efficiency of the Scottish criminal justice system."

=== Powers of arrest without warrant ===
The statutory power of arrest without warrant by constables in Scotland are set out in Chapter 1 of the Criminal Justice (Scotland) Act 2016. It provides a constable with the power of arrest without warrant if they have reasonable grounds for suspecting that the person has committed or is committing an offence. The power of arrest without warrant under the Terrorism Act 2000 can also be used.

Once a person has been placed under arrest, a statement, similar to the caution read in England and Wales as set out under the Police and Criminal Evidence Act 1984, must be read to the person as soon as reasonably practical, informing them:

- that they are under arrest,
- the general nature of the offence for which the person is arrested
- the reason for the arrest
- they are not obliged to say anything other than to provide the constable with their name, address, date of birth, place of birth and nationality, and
- they have the right to both intimation and access to a solicitor

This statement is set out under Police Scotland's Standard Operating Procedure governing the arrest process as the following:

"I am arresting you under Section 1 of the Criminal Justice (Scotland) Act 2016 for (general nature of offence). The reason for your arrest is that I suspect you have committed an offence and I believe that keeping you in custody is necessary and proportionate for the purposes of bringing you before a court or otherwise dealing with you in accordance with the law. Do you understand?

You are not obliged to say anything but anything you do say will be noted and may be used in evidence. Do you understand?

I do require you to give me your name, date of birth, place of birth, nationality and address.

You have the right to have a solicitor informed of your arrest and to have access to a solicitor. These rights will be explained to you further on arrival at the police station."

Where an arrest occurs outside a police station, a constable must take the person as quickly as is reasonably practicable to a police station. If the person is released by police before being taken to a police station, they can be de-arrested if the constable is satisfied that there are no reasonable grounds for suspecting that the person has committed any offence.

==== Not Officially Accused ====
A person is defined as Not Officially Accused when they have been arrested without warrant under Section 1 of the Criminal Justice (Scotland) Act 2016 but has not been charged or reported to the Crown Office and Procurator Fiscal Service.

Once the person arrives at a police station, the arresting officer must speak to the custody Sergeant to seek authorisation to keep the person in custody. Authorisation may only be given if the custody Sergeant is satisfied that:

- there are reasonable grounds for suspecting that the person has committed an offence, and
- keeping the person in custody is necessary and proportionate for the purposes of bringing the person before a court or otherwise dealing with the person in accordance with the law.

If the person's custody has been authorised, they may only be held for a maximum period of 12 hours. After this 12 hour period, the person must either be charged with an offence or held for a further 12 hours following authorisation from a police inspector if the person is believed to be 18 years of age or over, or a chief inspector if the person is believed to be under 18 years of age. This authorisation of extension can only be given if the constable is satisfied that:

- the previous authorisation test is still satisfied
- the offence the person is believed to have committed is an indictable offence
- the investigation into the offence the person is believed to have committed is being conducted diligently and expeditiously

==== Officially Accused ====
A person is defined as Officially Accused when they have been arrested without warrant under Section 1 of the Criminal Justice (Scotland) Act 2016 and have been charged or reported to the Crown Office and Procurator Fiscal Service.

When a person who is Officially Accused is arrested and taken into police custody, they may be held until they can be brought before a court to be tried.

=== Powers of arrest with warrant ===
A warrant is obtained from a court where it is required to secure the attendance of the person named on the warrant before the court. Warrants can be issued for both witnesses and suspects in trials. Warrants may also be issued where powers of arrest for an offence do not exist or for non-payment of fines.

There are three main types of warrant that grant constables a power of arrest:

- Apprehension warrant – Commonly used where the accused cannot be traced or has gone into hiding or for those who fail to appear at court. A constable may break open shut and lockfast places when executing an apprehension warrant.
- Fines enquiry warrant – Issued where a fine has been imposed on a person as part of a sentence and has not been paid. The person can then be arrested and put before a means enquiry court to ascertain their ability to pay the fine.
- Extract conviction warrant – A custodial sentence can be imposed on a person in the absence of the ability to pay a fine. The person can be arrested by police and given the opportunity to pay the fine. If the fine is not paid then the custodial sentence is to be imposed.

== Powers of entry ==
The main power used by police in Scotland to enter property is derived from common law. It broadly states that police are empowered to enter a house or other building without a warrant for the purposes of:

- protecting life and property;
- quelling an ongoing disturbance or disorder;
- assisting when hearing cries for help or of distress;
- close pursuit of a person who has committed or attempted to commit a serious crime, e.g. murder, rape, robbery or theft by housebreaking.

Moreover, police can also enter and search a premises where an invitation has been freely given by the occupant.

== Powers to direct traffic ==
The power to direct traffic exists under many road traffic laws, regulations, and orders. The prominent powers come from the Road Traffic Act 1988 with section 35 requiring drivers to comply with instructions from a constable when that constable is engaged in the regulation of traffic in a road. Further to this, section 37 creates an offence where a pedestrian does not comply with an instruction from a constable in uniform to stop and continues to proceed across or along the carriageway, when that constable is engaged in the regulation of vehicular traffic in a road.

== Powers of search ==
Police powers of search in Scotland can include both search with a warrant or search without a warrant.

=== Search with a warrant ===
A warrant is often craved to search a premise and is granted by a Sheriff or Justice of the Peace. A Justice of the Peace has limited authority as to the reason for granting the warrant – only for any controlled drug per Section 23(3) of the Misuse of Drugs Act 1971 or for stolen property at Common Law. The warrant must contain the purpose and limitations, i.e. what the police are looking for and the premise being searched. The warrant will specify the address of the premise being searched and will usually extend to include common areas, curtilage, outbuildings and all persons within. The warrant when executed will cease to exist and should police need to re-enter the premises after departing they may require another warrant.

=== Search without a warrant ===
The police in Scotland have powers under various pieces of legislation to search individuals for prohibited items, weapons, and stolen property. This is commonly known as "stop and search". Prior to 11 May 2017, officers were able to stop and search any person who consented to a search without requiring any grounds to suspect that person of committing a crime or having any prohibited items on their person. A new code of practice, made under the Criminal Justice (Scotland) Act 2016, came into force on that date which prohibits the practice of consensual searches. The stop and search of a person can only take place whether either a statutory power to search exists or a warrant permits a constable to search that person. Police officers generally have no right to enter private premises to conduct a search without first obtaining a warrant. They may however search the premises without a warrant where the occupier has granted their permission. Legislation conferring a power to stop and search include, but is not limited to, the following:

Section and Act	What can be searched for	Grounds for conducting search	Notes
Section 47 of the Firearms Act 1968	Firearms and ammunition	Reasonable cause to suspect a person is in possession of a firearm or ammunition in a public place	Can be exercised elsewhere than in a public place where the constable suspects the person to be committing or about to commit trespass with a firearm or they are carrying a firearm with criminal intent.
Section 23 of the Misuse of Drugs Act 1971	Controlled drugs	Reasonable grounds to suspect that that person is in possession of controlled drugs	A constable may also search any vehicle or vessel they suspect a controlled drug may be found in and may require the person in control of the vehicle or vessel to stop it.
Section 23A of the Misuse of Drugs Act 1971	Controlled drugs	Reasonable grounds to suspect that that person is in possession of A temporary class drugs	A constable may search the person and detain them for the purposes of searching them for temporary class drugs, if it does not appear to the constable that a power under section 23(2) applies to the case.
Section 60 of the Civic Government (Scotland) Act 1982	Stolen property	Reasonable grounds to suspect a person is in possession of any stolen property	A constable may also search any vehicle or vessel they suspect stolen property may be found in and may require the person in control of the vehicle or vessel to stop it.
Section 4 of the Crossbows Act 1987	Crossbows	Reasonable cause to suspect a person under the age of 18 is in possession of a crossbow	A constable may also search a vehicle under this provision.
Section 11 of the Protection of Badgers Act 1992	Evidence of an offence relating to badgers	Reasonable grounds to suspect a person of committing or having committed an offence under that act or the Badgers Act 1973	A constable may also search a vehicle under this provision.
Section 11A of the Fireworks Act 2003	Fireworks	Prohibitions include possession of "adult fireworks" in a public place by persons under the age of 18	A constable may search if they have reasonable grounds for suspecting that the person possesses a firework in contravention of a prohibition imposed by fireworks regulations.
Section 60 of the Criminal Justice and Public Order Act 1994	Offensive weapons, dangerous instruments and items for concealing identity	No grounds required where authorisation has been given	Authorisation may be given by an officer of the rank of Superintendent or above for up to 24 hours for a particular area. A constable in uniform may stop pedestrians or vehicles and search persons.
Section 21 of the Criminal Law (Consolidation) (Scotland) Act 1995	Alcohol or controlled article, container or substance	Reasonable grounds to suspect a person is committing or has committed an offence under Part II of the act	Allows a constable to search a person at a designated sporting fixture for fireworks, flares, alcohol, bottles, cans and various other items.
Section 48 of the Criminal Law (Consolidation) (Scotland) Act 1995	Offensive weapons	Reasonable grounds to suspect a person is carrying an offensive weapon in a public place	An offensive weapon is defined as an article made, adapted or intended for causing injury to a person.
Section 49B of the Criminal Law (Consolidation) (Scotland) Act 1995	Offensive weapons/bladed or pointed articles in Schools	A constable may enter school premises and search those premises and any person on those premises for any article to which section 49 of the Act applies, or any offensive weapon within the meaning of section 47 of the Act, if they have reasonable grounds for suspecting that an offence under section 49A of the Act is being, or has been, committed.	
Section 50 of the Criminal Law (Consolidation) (Scotland) Act 1995	Pointed or bladed articles	Reasonable grounds to suspect a person is carrying a pointed or bladed article in a public place	Where a constable has reasonable grounds for suspecting that a person has with them an article to which Section 49 of the Act applies and has committed or is committing an offence under s49 (1).
Section 66 of the Criminal Justice (Scotland) Act 2016	An item or substance that could cause harm to a person	Where a person is being transported by a constable by virtue of any enactment, order or warrant or where they are being transported and it is necessary for the care and protection	Could be used when transporting a person to a place of safety under section 297 of the Mental Health (Care and Treatment) (Scotland) Act 2003 for instance.
Section 67 of the Criminal Justice (Scotland) Act 2016	To ensure the health, safety and security of people attending an event	Any person seeking to enter or who has entered relevant premises or any person seeking to attend or who is attending a relevant event	Can be used to search a person as a condition of entry to a place or event subject to certain conditions.^{a}
Section 7 of the Protection of Wild Mammals (Scotland) Act 2002	Hunting a Wild Mammal with a dog	A constable who suspects that a person has committed or is committing an offence under this Act may stop and search if reasonable to suspect evidence in connection with the offence is to be found on that person.	
Section 4 of the Wild Mammals (Protection) Act 1996	Protection of Wild Mammals	Evidence of the commission of offence	Where a constable has reasonable grounds for suspecting that a person has committed an offence under the provisions of this Act (various harms to wild mammals) and that evidence of the commission of the offence may be found on that person, the constable may without warrant, stop and search that person.

In addition to these powers, constables are empowered to search any person they have arrested at common law to find any of the articles which may have assisted them in, or are products of, the crime or offence with which they have been charged.

When searching a person in a public place a constable may require a person to remove an outer coat, jacket, gloves, headgear or footwear. Should a more thorough search requiring removal of any other item of clothing this should be done out of public view where possible. Where a search involves exposure of an intimate part of the body (a strip search) this must be done at a police station or other nearby location that is out of public view. A strip search may only be conducted when authorised by a police officer of the rank of Inspector or above and may only be done by officers of the same sex as the person being searched.

== Powers of seizure and surrender ==
=== Seizure ===
Police have the common law power to seize evidence as part of a criminal investigation. Where it is alleged, or there is a reasonable belief, that any liquid, animal, document or article has a connection to a crime or offence under review, they can be taken by police as a production.

Aside from this, there are statutory powers that permit police to seize specific items namely;

- Motor vehicles – where driven without licence or insurance under section 165A, Road Traffic Act 1988.
- Cash and listed assets – where a reasonable suspicious is held that these have been obtained through criminal activity, provided the amount is at least £1,000 in cash or listed assets (like precious metals/stones or watches) these can be seized under the Proceeds of Crime Act 2002, s289 or s303C.
- Fireworks – The police can confiscate fireworks that they think are going to be used for antisocial purposes under the Fireworks Act 2003, s11A.

=== Surrender ===
Police also have statutory powers to require the surrender of specific items such as alcohol and tobacco products from persons under 18 years of age – these are surrendered without a search.

- Alcohol – when in possession of persons under 18 years of age and in a public place or a constable has reasonable grounds for suspecting that a person of or over the age of 18 will supply to a person under the age of 18 for consumption in a public place. See section 61, Crime and Punishment (Scotland) Act 1997.
- Tobacco products or cigarette papers – when in possession of persons under 18 years of age and in a public place under section 7, Tobacco and Primary Medical Services (Scotland) Act 2010.

== Power to remove drunk persons ==
Section 49 of the Criminal Justice (Scotland) Act 2016 empowers a constable to take a person to any place designated by the Scottish Ministers if the person is deemed drunk by the constable and is liable to be arrested for an offence. This removal is used as an alternative to arresting the person, which Officers may choose to do under section 50, Civic Government (Scotland) Act 1982.

== Power to require particulars ==
Under section 13 of the Criminal Procedure (Scotland) Act 1995, a constable is empowered to require the name, address, date of birth, place of birth (in as much detail as the constable considers necessary) and the nationality of anyone whom they suspect of committing or having committed an offence. It is an offence to fail to provide these details or to fail to remain with the constable whilst these details are required or verified. Under the same section of this act, a constable is empowered to require a witness to a crime to provide their particulars – their name, address, date of birth, place of birth and the nationality – failure to do so is an arrestable offence.

== Power to require specimens of breath, blood and urine ==
Constables are empowered, under section 7 of the Road Traffic Act 1988, to require two specimens of breath through a breathalyser or other device or one specimen of blood or urine from anyone suspected of committing a road traffic offence involving alcohol or drugs. A person who fails to prove such specimens without a reasonable excuse commits an offence.

== See also ==
- Constable
- Police officer
- Police Scotland
- Custody officer
- Law enforcement in the United Kingdom
- Scots law
- Powers of the police in England and Wales

== Notes ==
a. "Section 67 provides express statutory authority for the police to search people as a condition of entry at relevant premises and events, for the purposes of ensuring the health, safety or security of people there. This is subject to specific conditions: the premises or event must be open to members of the public, entrance must be controlled by the occupier or organiser, (so this will not apply to public marches or demonstrations), the occupier or organiser must have imposed a condition of entry that the person consents to being searched and the person must inform the constable that they consent to being searched." Explanatory note on section 67 of the Criminal Justice Scotland Act 2016
