= Powers of the police in England and Wales =

The powers of the police in England and Wales are defined largely by statute law, with the main sources of power being the Police and Criminal Evidence Act 1984 and the Police Act 1996. This article covers the powers of police officers of territorial police forces only, but a police officer in one of the UK's special police forces (most commonly a member of the British Transport Police) can utilise extended jurisdiction powers outside of their normal jurisdiction in certain defined situations as set out in statute. In law, police powers are given to constables (both full-time and volunteer special constables). All police officers in England and Wales are "constables" in law whatever their rank. Certain police powers are also available to a limited extent to police community support officers and other non warranted positions such as police civilian investigators or designated detention officers employed by some police forces even though they are not constables.

There are several general powers constables have that normal members of the public do not, including:

- the power to detain people in certain circumstances
- the power to stop and search people/vehicles in certain circumstances
- various powers of entry in certain circumstances
- the power to seize and retain property in certain circumstances
- the power to arrest people with or without warrant for any offence and in various other circumstances. (A significantly wider power than that provided to members of the public, often described as "citizen's arrest")
- the power to direct the behaviour of persons and vehicles on highways and in other public places
- the power to demand name/address and certain documents of anyone driving a motor vehicle on a public road

The powers have various limits and generally require a clear reason for their exercise to be made known to a person subject of to one of the above powers, unless impractical due to the persons behavior or unusual circumstances.

Powers to stop and search can be extended on a limited (by place and duration) basis by legislation such as s.60 of the Criminal Justice and Public Order Act 1994 or ss.44-47 of the Terrorism Act 2000.

Once a person has been arrested his/her vehicle or residence can be searched without the need for a warrant to be obtained for the purpose of obtaining evidence connected to the offence causing the arrest, as long as the offence or suspected offence was indictable. This power is provided by Section 18(1) or 18(5) and/or 32(2) of PACE 1984 depending on the circumstances. If a person is arrested in a premises or were in a premises immediately before arrest, Section 32(2) states a Constable has the power "to enter and search any premises in which he was when arrested or immediately before he was arrested for evidence relating to the offence". Constables and PCSOs also have the power under this section to search an individual for items that may assist or facilitate an escape from custody (i.e. an arrest or detention)

== Source of powers ==
The basic powers of the police derive from the Police Act 1996, which covers attestation (section 29), jurisdiction (section 30) and a number of other matters. Day to day, common law features greatly in relation to use of force (self defence & defence of others) and a number of other areas. The Police and Criminal Evidence Act 1984 is a key piece of legislation in relation to policing which was amended by the Serious Organised Crime and Police Act 2005, significantly, in relation to powers of arrest. Another notable piece of legislation is the Police Reform Act 2002. This act extended limited policing powers to those within the police family who are not warranted constables, such as PCSOs and others.

== Exclusive powers ==
The Policing and Crime Act 2017 identified a set of powers exclusive to constables that could not be conferred on police staff such as Police Community Support Officers. Section 28(4)(a) states a PCSO will be able to be designated with "any power or duty of a constable (other than a power or duty specified in Part 1 of Schedule 3B excluded powers and duties)". These excluded powers would be:

- Any power or duty of a constable to make an arrest under s24 PACE 1984 (note: this does not limit the use of s24A PACE powers)
- Any power or duty of a constable to stop and search an individual or a vehicle or other thing
- The power of a constable, under section 36(4) of the Police and Criminal Evidence Act 1984, to perform the functions of a custody officer at a designated police station if a custody officer is not readily available to perform them
- Any power that is exercisable only by a constable of a particular rank
- Any power of a constable under (a) the Terrorism Act 2000; (b) the Terrorism Act 2006; (c) the Counter-Terrorism Act 2008; (d) the Terrorism Prevention and Investigation Measures Act 2011; (e) the Counter-Terrorism and Security Act 2015
- Any power of a constable under the Official Secrets Act 1911 to 1989
- The power of a constable to make an application on behalf of the Commissioner of Police of the Metropolis under section 6 of the Regulation of Investigatory Powers Act 2000 (applications for interception warrants)

This bill received Royal Assent on 31 January 2017 and was subsequently passed into law.

== Detention ==
There are three different types of detention:

- detention without arrest,
- detention after arrest (but before charge), and
- detention after charge.

=== Detention without arrest ===
Detention without arrest is only permitted in certain circumstances, and is not a generally available power as in some other jurisdictions. In addition to the power to detain during a search (as described below) a Constable may detain a person under the following provisions (other public servants are also able to use some of these powers):

Section and Act	Purpose	Duration	Notes
section 12 of the Contempt of Court Act 1981	for contempt of court	until the court rises (end of the day)	when ordered by the court
section 136 of the Mental Health Act 1983	people suffering from mental disorders in a public place and in immediate need of care or control	for 72 hours	
section 138 or section 18 of the Mental Health Act 1983	people who have absconded from detention under the Act	to return them to lawful custody	
section 118 of the County Courts Act 1984	for contempt of court	until the court rises (end of the day)	when ordered by the court
section 136 of the Magistrates' Courts Act 1980	for non-payment of a fine	until 8am the next morning	when ordered by the court
section 21A of the Football Spectators Act 1989	to determine whether a football banning order should be made	for four hours (six with permission of an Inspector)	British citizens only

=== Detention after arrest ===
Where a person is arrested for an offence, they will be taken to a police station. The custody officer at that police station must determine whether he has sufficient evidence to charge the detainee for the offence and may keep the detainee in custody until he can make this decision. The suspect may be charged if the charge officer believes that there is a reasonable prospect of conviction. If the Custody Officer determines that he does have sufficient evidence, he must charge the person or release him. If he determines he does not have enough evidence to charge him he must release him unless he has reasonable grounds for believing that his detention without being charged is necessary to secure or preserve evidence relating to an offence for which he is under arrest or to obtain such evidence by questioning him.

In terrorism cases, a person may be detained for a maximum of 28 days. Otherwise (and subject to exceptions), a person may be detained for a maximum of 96 hours from the relevant time (normally the time an arrested person arrives at the first police station that he is taken to), in line with the following restrictions:

Authorising person	Test to be applied	Requirement for review	Maximum limit
Custody Officer	insufficient evidence to charge the arrested person and; reasonable grounds for believing that his detention without being charged is necessary to secure or preserve evidence relating to an offence for which he is under arrest or to obtain such evidence by questioning him		
Review Officer	insufficient evidence to charge the arrested person and; reasonable grounds for believing that his detention without being charged is necessary to secure or preserve evidence relating to an offence for which he is under arrest or to obtain such evidence by questioning him	6 hours after the decision to detain or 9 hours after the last review	24 hours from the relevant time
Superintendent or above	the Review Officer has made two reviews; reasonable grounds for believing that; his detention without being charged is necessary to secure or preserve evidence relating to an offence for which he is under arrest or to obtain such evidence by questioning him; offence for which he is under arrest is an indictable offence; investigation is being conducted diligently and expeditiously		36 hours from the relevant time
Magistrates' court	application made on oath by a Constable; satisfied that there are reasonable grounds for believing that; his detention without charge is necessary to secure or preserve evidence relating to an offence for which he is under arrest or to obtain such evidence by questioning him; an offence for which he is under arrest is an indictable offence; and; the investigation is being conducted diligently and expeditiously.	A magistrates' court can only grant or extend a warrant for up to 36 hours.	96 hours from the relevant time

On expiry of the time limit, the arrested person must be released, either on or without police bail and may not be rearrested without warrant for the same offence unless new evidence has come to light since the original arrest.

=== Detention after charge ===
Following charge, a person may be detained in custody pending their trial or during their trial before sentencing.

Immediately after charge, if the detainee is not released (either on police bail or without bail), he must be brought before a magistrates' court as soon as is practicable (first appearance).

=== Treatment in detention ===
The treatment of suspects held in detention is governed by Code H to the Police and Criminal Evidence Act 1984 in the case of suspects related to terrorism and by Code C in other cases. It is generally the responsibility of a designated Custody Officer to ensure that the provisions of the relevant Code and of the Police and Criminal Evidence Act 1984 are not breached.

In particular, a person detained has the following rights; and must be informed of these rights at the earliest opportunity:

- to have one friend or relative or other person who is known to him or who is likely to take an interest in his welfare told that he has been arrested and where he is being detained; and
- to consult a solicitor.
- three meals a day
- drinks "on demand"
- eight hours of sleep/rest at night
- a clean cell

Some or all of these rights may be suspended in exceptional circumstances.

== Search without warrant ==
=== Premises ===
A Constable may enter and search any premises occupied or controlled by a person who is under arrest for an indictable offence, if they have reasonable grounds for believing that there is on the premises evidence (other than items subject to legal privilege) that relates to that offence, or to some other indictable offence which is connected with or similar to that offence. This power, under section 18(1) of PACE, requires the authority of a police officer of at least the rank of Inspector and is normally conducted whilst a person is in police custody at a police station. Under PACE section 18(5), such a search of premises may be conducted prior to the arrested person being detained in police custody and prior to an authority by an Inspector if the presence of the person at a place (other than a police station) is necessary for the effective investigation of the offence. However an Inspector must be informed following such a search. This power is used much less than 18(1).

Under section 32 of PACE, a constable has the power, if a person has been arrested for an indictable offence, to enter and search any premises in which he was when arrested or immediately before s/he was arrested for evidence relating to the offence.

=== People or vehicles ===
==== Search without arrest ====
The Police and Criminal Evidence Act 1984 (PACE) was enacted to correct problems with the implementation of the powers used by the police. The "sus" law allowed police to stop, search, and subsequently arrest a "suspected person" without warrant, reason or evidence. Due to the unfair implementation of this law within the black community, there were riots in some parts of the country in majority black areas (Brixton, Handsworth, Toxteth, Southall and Moss Side) in the early 1980s and "sus" was repealed in 1981. The vast majority of search powers now require "reasonable suspicion" of an offence to be present, although this has not prevented stop-and-search from being used disproportionately against black people, who are over nine times more likely to be searched than white people, Asian people nearly three times more likely to be searched and BAME members in general four times more likely. This disparity can also be seen when looking at arrests, as a black person is over three times as likely to be arrested and the whole BAME group nearly twice as likely. Constables cannot carry out "consensual" searches of a person unless a power to search exists.

Before searching anyone or anything (except an unattended vehicle), a constable in plain clothes must identify himself as a constable and show his warrant card or similar, and a constable (in uniform or otherwise) must state:

- their name and the name of the police station to which they are attached,
- the object of the proposed search,
- the grounds for the search, and
- that a copy of the search form will be available on demand for three months.
- the legal power being used to conduct the search,
- that the detained person is detained for the purpose of a search,

Before searching an unattended vehicle, a constable must leave a notice (inside the vehicle unless it is not reasonably practicable to do so without damaging the vehicle) stating:

- that the vehicle has been searched,
- the name of the police station to which the constable is attached,
- that an application for compensation for any damage caused by the search may be made to that police station, and
- that a copy of the search record will be available on demand (if one was made).

The above provisions do not apply to searches under section 6 of PACE or section 27(2) of the Aviation Security Act 1982, which both relate to vehicles leaving goods handling areas where searches are routine.

A search without arrest is unlawful if it appears to the constable, after first detaining the person or vehicle, that the search is not required or it is impracticable. A person or vehicle may be detained for the purposes of a search for as long as is reasonably required to permit a search to be carried out either at the place where the person or vehicle was first detained or nearby. Whilst in public, a constable cannot require a person to remove any of his clothing other than an outer coat, jacket or gloves (except in the case of a search under sections 43, 43A or 47A of the Terrorism Act 2000, which additionally permits the removal of footwear and headgear).

===== Searches that require individual suspicion =====
Section and Act	Where	What can be searched	What it/they can be searched for	Grounds for conducting the search	Notes
Animals and game
section 2 of the Poaching Prevention Act 1862	any highway, street, or public place	any person (or any person aiding or abetting such person) or vehicle	unlawfully obtained game, or any gun, part of gun, or nets or engines used for the killing or taking game	good cause to suspect of coming from any land where he shall have been unlawfully in search or pursuit of game	
section 12 of the Deer Act 1991	anywhere	any vehicle, animal, weapon or other thing	evidence of the commission of an offence under the Act	suspects with reasonable cause of committing or having committed an offence under the Act	
section 4 of the Conservation of Seals Act 1970	anywhere	any vehicle or boat	used by a person suspected to be committing an offence under the Act	suspects with reasonable cause of committing an offence under the Act	
section 11 of the Protection of Badgers Act 1992	anywhere	any person, vehicle or article	evidence of the commission of an offence under the Act, or under the Badgers Act 1973	reasonable grounds for suspecting of committing an offence under the Act	
Goods and other items
section 6 of the Public Stores Act 1875	anywhere	any person, vessel, boat or vehicle	stolen government property	reason to suspect that stolen government property may be found	Metropolitan Police constables only, unless specifically authorised
section 23 of the Misuse of Drugs Act 1971	anywhere	any person or vehicle	controlled drugs	reasonable grounds to suspect that that person, or a person inside that vehicle, is in possession of controlled drugs	
section 163 of the Customs and Excise Management Act 1979	anywhere	any vehicle, vessel or non-airborne aircraft	goods which are: chargeable with any duty which has not been paid or secured, in the course of being unlawfully removed from or to any place, or; otherwise liable to forfeiture under the Customs and Excise Acts.	reasonable grounds to suspect the vehicle or vessel is carrying such goods	
section 24B of the Aviation Security Act 1982	any aerodrome	any person, vehicle or aircraft, or anything which is in or on a vehicle or aircraft	stolen or prohibited articles	reasonable grounds for suspecting the finding of stolen or prohibited articles	meaning of "prohibited" given by subsection (5) of that section
section 1 of the Police and Criminal Evidence Act 1984	a public place	any person or vehicle, or anything which is in or on a vehicle	stolen goods; offensive weapons; knives and bladed articles; illegal fireworks; corrosive substances (such as to be used in an acid attack); an article made or adapted for use in the course of, or in connection with: theft; burglary; TWOC; fraud; criminal damage; obstructing the highway, which causes or is capable of causing serious disruption to two or more individuals or to an organisation; causing public nuisance; locking on; causing serious disruption by tunnelling; obstruction etc of major transport works; interference with use or operation of "key national infrastructure" (such as major roads, railways, airports and harbours; energy infrastructure; newspaper presses and life sciences infrastructure)	reasonable grounds for suspecting the finding of such items	
section 7 of the Sporting Events (Control of Alcohol etc.) Act 1985	anywhere	any person, public service vehicle or train	the person is committing or has committed an offence under the Act, or an offence under the Act is being committed or has been committed on the vehicle or train	reasonable grounds to suspect the person is committing or has committed an offence under the Act	offences under the Act include possession of alcohol or flares and being drunk on transport to football matches, or whilst in or attempting to enter the football ground
section 34B of the Environmental Protection Act 1990	anywhere	any vehicle used to dump waste unlawfully	general power of inspection	reasonable belief that an unlawful dumping offence has been, is being or is about to be committed	
Paragraph 7A of Schedule 4 of the Police Reform Act 2002	public place or designated zones	any person aged under 18 / any age	alcohol or a container for alcohol in his possession	the CSO reasonably believes that the person has it in his possession	only applies to PCSOs - most PRA2002 powers designate PCSOs the specific power of Constable. This paragraph failed to do so and designated the power to a PCSO only However, constables have other powers to deal with circumstances where this power may be required. The power was introduced for PCSOs to ensure they had some authority to deal with incidents requiring this power. Note: Unlike most searches by constables, the person being searched must consent to the search. Failure to consent is an offence but there is no power for PCSOs to forcibly conduct the search.
Paragraph 7A of Schedule 4 of the Police Reform Act 2002	public place	any person aged under 18	tobacco or cigarette papers in his possession	the CSO reasonably believes that the person has it in his possession	only applies to PCSOs - most PRA2002 powers designate PCSOs the specific power of Constable. This paragraph failed to do so and designated the power to a PCSO only. However, constables have other powers to deal with circumstances where this power may be required. The power was introduced for PCSOs to ensure they had some authority to deal with incidents requiring this power. Note: Unlike most searches by constables, the person being searched must consent to the search. Failure to consent is an offence but there is no power for PCSOs to forcibly conduct the search.
Weapons
section 47 of the Firearms Act 1968	any public place	any person or vehicle	firearms or ammunition	reasonable cause to suspect of possession	
section 47 of the Firearms Act 1968	anywhere other than a public place	any person or vehicle	committing or being about to commit offences under section 18 and section 20	reasonable cause to suspect of committing or being about to commit such offences	
section 4 of the Crossbows Act 1987	anywhere	any person aged under 17	a crossbow (or part of)	suspects with reasonable cause that a person has or has had a crossbow	does not apply where that person is or was under the supervision of a person aged 21+
section 4 of the Crossbows Act 1987	anywhere	any vehicle	a crossbow (or part of) connected with an offence under section 3 of that Act	suspects with reasonable cause that a person under 17 has or has had a crossbow	does not apply where that person is or was under the supervision of a person aged 21+
section 139B of the Criminal Justice Act 1988	school premises	the premises and any person on them	offensive weapons or objects with blades or sharp points	reasonable grounds for suspecting that a person has or has had such an item on the premises	
paragraph 2(2), schedule 8 to the Air Traffic Management and Unmanned Aircraft Act 2021	anywhere the constable is lawfully	any person or vehicle	an unmanned aircraft (a drone) or an article associated with an unmanned aircraft	reasonable grounds for suspecting that the drone has been used: to contravene an airport flight restriction zone, in a manner likely to endanger an aircraft or any person in an aircraft, or; has been involved in assisting a prisoner to escape, or smuggling a prohibited item into a prison	
paragraph 2(3), schedule 8 to the Air Traffic Management and Unmanned Aircraft Act 2021	anywhere the constable is lawfully	any person or vehicle	an unmanned aircraft (a drone) or an article associated with an unmanned aircraft	reasonable grounds for suspecting that the drone has been used in a way that constitutes an offence under various legislation, and has been done to: endanger any other aircraft, to cause any person harm, harassment, alarm or distress, to undermine security or good order and discipline in any prison or in any other institution where persons are lawfully detained, to damage property (including land or buildings) or; to threaten national security.	
paragraph 2(4), schedule 8 to the Air Traffic Management and Unmanned Aircraft Act 2021	anywhere the constable is lawfully	any person or vehicle	an article which is or has been involved in assisting a prisoner to escape, or smuggling a prohibited item into a prison	reasonable grounds for suspecting that the drone has been used in assisting a prisoner to escape, or smuggling something banned into a prison	
Terrorism
section 43 of the Terrorism Act 2000	anywhere	any person	evidence that that person is a terrorist (defined by section 40)	reasonably suspects that person to be a terrorist	
section 43A of the Terrorism Act 2000	anywhere	a vehicle (including the driver of the vehicle, a passenger in the vehicle, anything in or on the vehicle or carried by the driver or a passenger)	evidence that: that vehicle is used for the purposes of terrorism; that person is a terrorist (defined by section 40)	reasonably suspects that the vehicle is being used for the purposes of terrorism	

===== Searches that do not require individual suspicion =====
Some search powers can be used by police to search anyone in a particular area if a senior police officer suspects/believes that a particular type of serious and widespread crime has occurred or is likely to occur in that area. These authorisations only last for a defined period of time (up to 24 hours) but allow searches to be conducted regardless of whether the police individually suspect the person to be searched.

Section and Act	Where	What can be searched	What it/they can be searched for	Grounds for authorising the use of the power
section 27 (2) of the Aviation Security Act 1982	any cargo area of an aerodrome which is a designated airport	any vehicle or aircraft and any goods carried by people (but does not include people)	general power of inspection	applies to all vehicles and goods automatically
section 60 of the Criminal Justice and Public Order Act 1994	anywhere specified by an authorisation	any pedestrian (or anything carried by him) and any vehicle, its driver and any passenger	offensive weapons or objects with blades or sharp points	an inspector reasonably believes: that incidents involving serious violence may take place in the area, and that it is expedient to give an authorisation under this section to prevent their occurrence, that an incident involving serious violence has already taken place in the area, that a dangerous instrument or offensive weapon used in the incident is being carried by someone there, and it is expedient to give an authorisation under this section to find the instrument or weapon; that people are carrying dangerous instruments or offensive weapons in the area without good reason
section 47A of the Terrorism Act 2000	anywhere specified by an authorisation	a vehicle (including the driver of the vehicle, a passenger in the vehicle, anything in or on the vehicle or carried by the driver or a passenger) or a pedestrian (and anything carried by the pedestrian)	evidence that: that vehicle is used for the purposes of terrorism, or; that person is a terrorist (defined by section 40)	an inspector reasonably suspects that an act of terrorism will take place, and reasonably considers that the authorisation is necessary to prevent such an act, the specified area is no greater than is necessary to prevent such an act, and that the duration of the authorisation is no longer than is necessary to prevent such an act.
section 11 of the Public Order Act 2023	anywhere specified by an authorisation	a vehicle (including the driver of the vehicle, a passenger in the vehicle, anything in or on the vehicle or carried by the driver or a passenger) or a pedestrian (and anything carried by the pedestrian)	an object to be used for one of the below offences	an inspector reasonably believes that one of the following offences may be committed in the area: obstructing the highway, which causes or is capable of causing serious disruption to two or more individuals or to an organisation; causing public nuisance; locking on; causing serious disruption by tunnelling; obstruction etc of major transport works; interference with use or operation of "key national infrastructure" (such as major roads, railways, airports and harbours; energy infrastructure; newspaper presses and life sciences infrastructure); or that people may have with them objects to use in the commission of any of those offences

==== Search after arrest ====
A Constable may search a person who has been arrested (unless the arrest was at a police station) if the Constable has reasonable grounds for believing that the arrested person may present a danger to himself or others. A Constable may also (unless the arrest was at a police station) search an arrested person for anything which he might use to assist him to escape from lawful custody, or which might be evidence relating to an offence.

This power is given to both Constables and PCSOs by Section 32 of the Police and Criminal Evidence act 1984.

A Constable may search a person arrested under section 41 of the Terrorism Act 2000 to discover whether he has in his possession anything which may constitute evidence that he is a terrorist (defined by section 40).

==== Searches in detention ====
The Custody Officer must record everything which an arrested person has with him at the police station and may search a person to the extent that he considers it necessary to do so, but may not conduct an intimate search for these purposes. The Custody Officer may seize anything, but may only seize clothes or personal effects if the Custody Officer:

- believes that the person from whom they are seized may use them:
  - to cause physical injury to himself or any other person,
  - to damage property,
  - to interfere with evidence,
  - to assist him to escape, or
- has reasonable grounds for believing that they may be evidence relating to an offence.

An Inspector also has a limited power to order a search of an arrested person in order to facilitate establishing the identity of a person, particularly by discovering tattoos or other marks. Where such a search requires more than the removal of the arrested person's outer clothing, the provisions of Code C to the Police and Criminal Evidence Act 1984 relating to strip searches apply.

An intimate search is a search of the bodily orifices (other than the mouth). It should be conducted by a suitably qualified person unless this is impracticable and done in the presence of two other people. An intimate search requires the authorisation of an inspector and may only be made in one of the following circumstances:

Condition	Consent	Place
The inspector reasonably believes: that the detainee has concealed on him anything he could use and might use in police detention or custody of the court to cause physical injury to himself or others; and; that the article in question cannot be found unless the detainee is intimately searched.	Consent is not necessary for the search to take place and reasonable force may be used to conduct the search.	Police station, hospital, surgery or other medical premises.
The inspector reasonably believes: that the detainee may have a Class A drug concealed on him; that the detainee was in possession of the drug before his arrest with intention to illegally supply or export it; and; that it cannot be found unless the detainee is intimately searched.	Consent for the search is necessary. If the detainee refuses to give consent, proper inferences may be drawn but force may not be used.	Hospital, surgery or other medical premises.

== Stop and account ==
"Stop and account" is a standard operating procedure, rather than a power, of the police, under Recommendation 61 (Rec.61); it is not a statutory procedure like stop and search. It applies to people on foot in a public place. There is no power to force a person to stop, or to detain them. The decision to "request" a person to "stop and account" is left to the discretion of the individual officer; there is no guidance on this. Unlike stop and search, there is no requirement for "reasonable suspicion". There is no actual requirement on a police officer, beyond identifying themself as such; no need to tell the persons stopped why they are being asked to account for themselves, or to say that they are free to leave without answering questions. However, police forces have procedures governing stops. While a record must be made of every stop, there is no requirement for police forces to keep statistics on number of stops or ethnicity of people stopped, according to the College of Policing.

Advice to the public on the West Midlands Police website explains:

What is a Stop and Account? Stop and Account is different from Stop and Search and is when an officer stops you and asks you:

what you are doing;
why you are in an area or where you are going; or
what you are carrying.

A police officer or police community support officer (PCSO) does not have the power to force you to stay with them if you are stopped and asked for your actions.

— West Midlands Police

Different police forces have different documents, and forms for recording stops. According to the Metropolitan Police the documented stop and account procedure was recommended after the Stephen Lawrence Inquiry found that stopping people informally, as had been the usual procedure, "created a barrier between the police and the community. These stops were not monitored and no records were kept." The Home Office said in 2013 that stop and account was not a defined power set out in primary legislation, but an "important part of on-street policing. ... It constitutes the next step beyond the general conversations officers have with members of the public every day."

== Power of seizure ==
The main power of seizure a constable (and PCSO also since 2012) has is provided by Section 19 of PACE 1984. This provides a general power of seizure for anything that has he/she has reasonable grounds for believing was obtained during the commission of an offence and that the seizure is necessary to stop it being concealed, lost, damaged or destroyed. The same section also provides a power of seizure of items suspected to be evidence of an offence.

Other powers also exist, such as customs powers which provide a Constable, Customs Officer or any member of the British Armed Forces or Coastguard the ability to seize, retain and condemn goods under the Customs and Excise Management Act 1979

== Arrest without warrant ==
The only powers of detention that are available to a Constable in England and Wales are discussed above. A Constable's power of arrest is provided by the following sources:

- Common law – to prevent a breach of the peace
- Section 49 of the Prison Act 1952
- Section 32 Children & Young Persons Act 1969
- Immigration Act 1971
- Section 7 of the Bail Act 1976
- Section 1 & Section 13 of the Magistrates' Courts Act 1980 (warrants)
- Section 136 of the Mental Health Act 1983
- Section 24 Police Criminal Evidence Act 1984
- Section 46A Police Criminal Evidence Act 1984
- Section 31 Police Criminal Evidence Act 1984
- Section 6D of the Road Traffic Act 1988
- Section 41 of the Terrorism Act 2000
- Section 9 of Anti-social Behaviour, Crime and Policing Act 2014
- Section 27 of the National Security Act 2023

Whether being arrested, detained or spoken to about an offence or suspected offence, Section 10 Code C of PACE states that the caution must be used. When used in conjunction with an arrest the suspect:

- must be told that he is under arrest, and
- must be "told in simple, non-technical language that he could understand, the essential legal and factual grounds for his arrest" including why the arrest in itself is necessary

A person must be "cautioned" when being arrested unless this is impractical due to the behaviour or condition of the arrestee, such as drunkenness or unresponsive. There is also a requirement to caution an individual when they are also suspected of a criminal offence but are not being subject to arrest at that time. The caution is:

You do not have to say anything, but it may harm your defence if you do not mention when questioned something which you may later rely on in court. Anything you do say may be given in evidence.

Deviation from this accepted form is permitted provided that the same information is conveyed. There also exists the "when" caution (above), "now" caution and a "restricted" caution. The "when" caution is generally used during an arrest or interview on the street or at a police station. The "now" caution is most commonly used when charging or issuing an FPN or PND.

Persons other than constables "who are charged with the duty of investigating offences or charging offenders" (e.g. escort officers, detention officers, DWP fraud investigators, PCSOs, IPCC investigators, etc.) have a duty to adhere to any relevant provisions of the codes of practice as per Section 67(9) PACE.

There are three general means of arresting without warrant: firstly in relation to a criminal offence, secondly in relation to a breach of the peace and thirdly for miscellaneous purposes.

=== Criminal offences ===
Prior to 1967, the only general power of arrest for offences was that which existed for felonies. In 1964, Home Secretary Rab Butler asked the Criminal Law Revision Committee to look into the distinction between felonies and misdemeanours, and their recommendation was that the distinction be abolished, as it was obsolete. As most powers of arrest relied on the offence being a felony, a new set of arrest criteria were introduced by the Criminal Law Act 1967, which created the arrestable offence (defined as an offence where an adult could be sentenced to imprisonment for five years or more).

These arrest powers were later re-enacted by the Police and Criminal Evidence Act 1984 (PACE), which also created an alternative set of arrest criteria (the "general arrest criteria") which applied in particular circumstances, such as where the person's name or address were not known. As time went on, the number of offences that were defined as "arrestable" grew significantly, to the point where the distinction was becoming confusing and unworkable.

In 2005, the PACE powers of arrest were repealed by the Serious Organised Crime and Police Act, which also abolished the arrestable offence and instead replaced it with a need-tested system for arrest which applied to every offence.

A constable may therefore arrest (without a warrant):

- anyone who is about to commit an offence, or anyone whom he has reasonable grounds for suspecting to be about to commit an offence,
- anyone who is in the act of committing an offence, or anyone whom he has reasonable grounds for suspecting to be committing an offence, and
- anyone who is guilty of an offence or anyone whom he has reasonable grounds for suspecting to be guilty of an offence.

Additionally, if a constable suspects that an offence has been committed, then:

- anyone whom he has reasonable grounds to suspect of being guilty of it.

==== Conditions (a.k.a. arrest necessity test criteria) ====
Under Code G of PACE, a constable may only use the powers of arrest given above:

(a) to enable the name of the person in question to be ascertained (in the case where the constable does not know, and cannot readily ascertain, the person's name, or has reasonable grounds for doubting whether a name given by the person as his name is his real name),
(b) correspondingly as regards the person's address,
(c) to prevent the person in question:

- causing physical injury to himself or any other person,
- suffering physical injury,
- causing loss of or damage to property,
- committing an offence against public decency (only where members of the public going about their normal business cannot reasonably be expected to avoid the person in question), or
- causing an unlawful obstruction of the highway;

(d) to protect a child or other vulnerable person from the person in question,
(e) to allow the prompt and effective investigation of the offence or of the conduct of the person in question:

- when interviewing the suspect on occasions when the person's voluntary attendance is not considered to be a practicable alternative to arrest, because for example:
  - it is thought unlikely that the person would attend the police station voluntarily to be interviewed;
  - it is necessary to interview the suspect about the outcome of other investigative action for which their arrest is necessary;
  - arrest would enable the special warning to be given in accordance with Code C paragraphs 10.10 and 10.11 when the suspect fails to account or refuses to account for the circumstances where they are:
    - in possession of incriminating objects, or at a place where such objects are found;
    - at or near the scene of the crime at or about the time it was committed.
  - the person has made false statements and/or presented false evidence;
  - it is thought likely that the person:
    - may steal or destroy evidence;
    - may collude or make contact with, co-suspects or conspirators;
    - may intimidate or threaten or make contact with, witnesses.
- when considering arrest in connection with the investigation of an indictable offence (see Note 6), there is a need:
  - to enter and search without a search warrant any premises occupied or controlled by the arrested person or where the person was when arrested or immediately before arrest;
  - to prevent the arrested person from having contact with others;
  - to detain the arrested person for more than 24 hours before charge
- when considering arrest in connection with any recordable offence and it is necessary to secure or preserve evidence of that offence by taking fingerprints, footwear impressions or samples from the suspect for evidential comparison or matching with other material relating to that offence, for example, from the crime scene.
- when considering arrest in connection with any offence and it is necessary to search, examine or photograph the person to obtain evidence

(f) or to prevent any prosecution for the offence from being hindered by the disappearance of the person in question.

Notes 2A to 2J provide further clarification on the above: In relation to (a) above, where mobile fingerprinting is available and the suspect's name cannot be ascertained/is in doubt, consideration should be given using the power under 61(6A) of PACE (Code D para. 4.3(e)) to take and check the fingerprints of a suspect as this may avoid the need to arrest solely to enable a name to be ascertained.

In the instances above of being unable to ascertain name/address, causing physical injury to himself or other person, offences against public decency, obstruction of the highway, note 2D of Code G states that a warning should be considered before arrest in order to perhaps avoid the arrest or in order to clarify the justification for arrest by way of demonstrating the intent to commit the crime and therefore rebut any defence that they were acting reasonably.

The meaning of "prompt" under the "prompt and effective investigation" is held to be reviewed on a case-by-case basis and consideration should be given to street bailing the suspect rather than arresting them. Released on bail criteria are covered partly under 30A of PACE.

Voluntary attendance at a police station at a later date negates the need to arrest for the prompt and effective investigation when there is no suggestion that the suspect will not attend and if the suspect's name/address can be ascertained. When the person attends the police station for a voluntary interview, their arrest on arrival at the station prior to interview would only be justified if new information came to light after arrangements were made indicates that from that time, voluntary attendance ceased to be a practicable alternative and the person's arrest became necessary and it was not reasonably practicable for the person to be arrested before they attended the station.

If a person who attends for a voluntary interview decides to leave before the interview is complete, the police would at that point be entitled to consider whether their arrest was necessary to carry out the interview. The possibility that the person might decide to leave during the interview is therefore not a valid reason for arresting them before the interview has commenced. See Code C paragraph 3.16

Section 29(a) PACE states a person attending a police station or other place for a voluntary attendance is free to leave at any time unless he/she is placed under arrest. They are also to be immediately informed they are under arrest if a decision is made to arrest them to prevent them from leaving by the constable.

The necessity test has been held to have been incorrectly applied in the following instances, which are therefore unlawful arrests: Richardson v Chief Constable of West Midlands Police (2011), Alexander, Farrelly et al. judicial review (2009).

Section 30 of PACE states that any person arrested in a place other than a police station must be taken to a police station as soon as practicable after the arrest. This section also states that if at any time before reaching the police station, a constable is satisfied there are no grounds for keeping that person under arrest, they must be released without bail immediately and a record of this must be made. This section does not state that the original constable should release the individual if they become satisfied there is no reason to hold the suspect, but the section states that "a Constable" may become satisfied, which suggests that this may be a different constable than who made the original arrest.

===== Bail =====
When an offender is arrested and later released, bail conditions are often applied under Section 30(1) of PACE, which state the constable may impose bail conditions which as appear to the constable to be necessary:

- to secure that the person surrenders to custody
- to secure that the person does not commit an offence while on bail
- to secure that the person does not interfere with witnesses or otherwise obstruct the course of justice, whether in relation to himself or any other person
- for the person's own protection or, if the person is under the age of 18, for the person's own welfare or in the person's own interests

==== Other PACE arrest provisions ====
Although not part of the Codes of Practice as such, PACE itself does outlaw certain other practices, such as:

- Section 76 / 76A / 77 - concerns the unreliability of confessions gained through unfair or unreliable means
- Section 78 - concerns exclusion of unfair evidence

=== Breach of the peace ===
Breach of the peace is one of the oldest, and most basic offences still in existence in England & Wales. It is an offence at common law, not codified, so it cannot be found in any act of Parliament. The power of arrest in relation to breach of the peace is available to anyone (regardless of whether they are a constable or not), who may arrest without warrant:

- any person who commits a breach of the peace in his presence, or
- if they reasonably believe that a breach of the peace is about to occur or is imminent, any person in order to prevent that.

However, the Court of Appeal laid down the following conditions:

- there must be a real and present threat to the peace justifying depriving a citizen, not acting unlawfully at the time, of his liberty,
- the threat must come from the person arrested,
- the conduct must clearly interfere with the rights of others and its natural consequence must be not wholly unreasonable violence from a third party, and
- the conduct of the person arrested must be unreasonable.

=== Other powers of arrest ===
There are few powers of arrest without warrant where an offence is not either known or suspected to have been committed. A constable may arrest a person:

Absconding or going AWOL

- who he has reasonable cause to suspect of being:
  - an officer or rating of the Royal Navy,
  - an officer, warrant officer, non-commissioned officer or airman of the Royal Air Force,
  - an officer, warrant officer, non-commissioned officer or soldier of the British Army,

who has deserted or is absent without leave,

- who is unlawfully at large from a civilian prison, secure accommodation or young offenders institution or military prison,
- who has failed to answer bail or street bail,
- who has absconded whilst on remand for a report on their mental condition, on remand for treatment or subject to an interim hospital order under the Mental Health Act 1983,
- who has absconded whilst being transferred to or from the United Kingdom under a prisoner transfer agreement, or
- who has absconded from a place of safety to which he has been taken under the Powers of Criminal Courts (Sentencing) Act 2000 or from local authority accommodation in which he is required to live, or to which he has been remanded or committed.

Alcohol and driving

- who has provided a positive sample of breath (or has failed to provide any sample at all) under the Road Traffic or Transport and Works Acts, or
- who:
  - has been required to provide a sample of breath, blood or urine under section 7 or section 7A of the Road Traffic Act 1988 (that is to say, an evidential, not a preliminary breath test)
  - the constable believes is over the prescribed limit or is unfit to drive, and
  - is likely to drive or attempt to drive a vehicle.

Other powers

- to take fingerprints after a conviction
- who has failed to comply with a conditional caution,
- who has committed an offence against bylaws made under the Military Lands Act 1892,
- who he reasonably suspects of being a "terrorist". (Note: In the Terrorism Act 2000, "terrorist" means a person who has committed an offence under any of sections 11, 12, 15 to 18, 54 and 56 to 63 of that Act, or who is or has been concerned in the commission, preparation or instigation of acts of terrorism. "Terrorism" has the meaning given by section 1 of that Act.)
- who he reasonably suspects of breaching any bail conditions

== Reasonable force ==
A constable's power to use reasonable force is provided by the following law / statutory instruments:

- common law
- Article 2 European Convention on Human Rights 1953
- Section 3 Criminal Law Act 1967
- Section 117 PACE 1984
- "generally acceptable conduct" - Collins v. Wilcock (1984)
- Section 76 of the Criminal Justice and Immigration Act 2008
- Section 139B of the Criminal Justice Act 1988
- Section 53 of the Offensive Weapons Act 2019
- Section 143 of the Licensing Act 2003
- Section 28 of the National Security Act 2023

Common law has most recently affirmed the use of force in Beckford v R (1987), in which Lord Griffiths affirmed that "the test to be applied for self-defence is that a person may use such force as is reasonable in the circumstances as he honestly believes them to be in the defence of himself or another". A more general explanation of what is reasonable was also made four years prior in 1984 under Collins v. Wilcock (1984) 1 WLR 1172 DC, which stated that a Constable may use force not otherwise covered by legislation or other law if it they "had been acting within the bounds of what was generally acceptable in the ordinary conduct of daily life".

The European Convention on Human Rights 1953 further states:
"2. Deprivation of life shall not be regarded as inflicted in contravention of this article when it results from the use of force which is no more than absolutely necessary:
a. in defence of any person from unlawful violence;
b. in order to effect a lawful arrest or to prevent the escape of a person lawfully detained;
c. in action lawfully taken for the purpose of quelling a riot or insurrection."

The Criminal Law Act 1967 allows any person to use reasonable force in the circumstances in the prevention of crime, effecting or assisting the lawful arrest of offenders or suspected offenders or of persons unlawfully at large.

The Police and Criminal Evidence Act 1984 provides a power for a Constable to use reasonable force when they are lawfully using a power under the same act.

The Criminal Justice and Immigration Act 2008 further clarified the use of force as per the above, but also reiterated force may still be reasonable if it was influenced by an honestly held, albeit mistaken belief.

The Criminal Justice Act 1988 gives a Constable the power to enter a school premises and search those premises and any person for offensive weapons, allowing them to use reasonable force if necessary to do so.

The Offensive Weapons Act 2019 gives a Constable power to use reasonable force, "if necessary", in order to search and seize relevant articles in a school or further education premises for "corrosive substances".

== Powers of entry ==
A constable has a right of entry to private land in three broad circumstances: by consent, without consent, and without consent and by force.

In English law, "consent" in relation to trespass includes situations where a licence (i.e. permission to enter onto land) is implied without having to be explicitly stated: for example, walking through a private garden to reach the front door of a house for the purpose of delivering a letter. Where consent has not been granted by the occupier, entry without consent may be exercised where a search warrant has been issued, or in other specific circumstances where the matter is urgent or serious, and the power has been specifically granted by law. The police have the power to use reasonable force to enter under a warrant, and under the other powers of entry discussed below.

=== Search warrants ===
There are known to be around 900 provisions in law under which search warrants may be issued. Typically, these permit a police officer and/or other official (typically a council officer, or an officer of a government department) to enter and search premises, using force if necessary, and seize evidence. These are generally issued by a justice of the peace following a written application stating the reasons for entering. As a general rule, search warrants are only issued where access cannot be gained by consent, or where attempting to gain consent might lead to evidence being destroyed, etc.

=== Other powers of entry ===
Other than with a search warrant, a constable may enter premises only in specific circumstances, almost all of which are listed in section 17 of the Police and Criminal Evidence Act 1984 ("PACE"), which largely codified and replaced the historic common law provisions as to entry and search. In addition to powers under section 17 PACE, a small number of other Acts provide a power of entry (and search) without a warrant.

Where a power to enter and search for the purpose of arresting or recapturing a person comes from section 17 PACE, it is only exercisable if the constable has reasonable grounds for believing that the person whom he is seeking is on the premises. "Reasonable belief" is a higher threshold than that required to arrest a person, which only requires "reasonable suspicion". Therefore, there must be some fact that causes the constable to believe that the person in question is present at the time - for example, seeing a person present who matches their description, or being told that they are present.

A power to enter and search under section 17 for the purpose of arresting or recapturing a person is also limited, in relation to premises consisting of two or more separate dwellings, to entering and searching common areas (such as shared hallways, landings and stairways) and the dwelling in question, but not other dwellings in the same premises.

The power of search conferred by section 17 is only a power to search to the extent that is reasonably required for the purpose for which the power of entry is exercised. Therefore, a power to search for a person who is wanted would not include a power to search for evidence of the offence for which they are wanted. However, as the constable would be lawfully on the premises, if he were to come across such evidence in his search for the person it could still be seized under section 19 of PACE, and should the constable find and arrest the person who is wanted, he could then search the premises for evidence of the offence.

PACE defines "premises" as including any place and, in particular, includes any vehicle, vessel, aircraft or hovercraft, an offshore installation (such as an oil rig), a renewable energy installation (such as a wind turbine), and a tent or movable structure.

Source of power	Purpose	Extent of power	Notes
Common law	Deal with or prevent an imminent breach of the peace	Remain so long as is necessary: whilst on the premises a constable has the usual power to deal with or prevent a breach of the peace, including arrest where necessary	Power is to enter and remain for so long as is necessary (Thomas vs Sawkins [1935] 99 JP 295)
s17(1)(a) PACE	executing a warrant of arrest issued in connection with or arising out of criminal proceedings, or a warrant of commitment issued under section 76 of the Magistrates' Courts Act 1980	Enter and search for the person in question	
s17(1)(b) PACE	Arresting a person for an indictable offence	Enter and search for the person in question	
s17(1)(c) PACE	Arresting a person for an offence under: section 1 (prohibition of uniforms in connection with political objects) of the Public Order Act 1936, any enactment contained in sections 6, 7, 8 or 10 of the Criminal Law Act 1977 (offences relating to entering and remaining on property), section 4 of the Public Order Act 1986 (fear or provocation of violence), section 4 (driving etc. when under influence of drink or drugs) or section 163 (failure to stop for police) of the Road Traffic Act 1988, section 27 of the Transport and Works Act 1992 (which relates to offences involving drink or drugs), section 76 of the Criminal Justice and Public Order Act 1994 (failure to comply with interim possession order), any of sections 4, 5, 6(1) and (2), 7 and 8(1) and (2) of the Animal Welfare Act 2006 (offences relating to the prevention of harm to animals),	Enter and search for the person in question	The power of entry to arrest for an offence (without a warrant) normally only applies to indictable offences, but these summary offences provide specific powers of entry
s17(1)(ca) PACE	Arresting, in pursuance of section 32(1A) of the Children and Young Persons Act 1969, any child or young person who has been remanded or committed to local authority accommodation under section 23(1) of that Act	Enter and search for the person in question	
s17(1)(caa) PACE	Arresting a person for an offence to which section 61 of the Animal Health Act 1981 (transportation etc. of animals during rabies outbreak) applies	Enter and search for the person in question	
s17(1)(cb) PACE	Recapturing a person who is unlawfully at large while liable to be detained in a prison, remand centre, young offender institution or secure training centre, or in pursuance of section 92 of the Powers of Criminal Courts (Sentencing ) Act 2000 (dealing with children and young persons guilty of grave crimes), in any other place,	Enter and search for the person in question	Used to enter and search for escaped prisoners, but also prisoners who have been released on licence and whose licence has then been revoked (which makes them unlawfully at large)
s17(1)(d) PACE	Recapturing any person whatever who is unlawfully at large and whom he is pursuing	Enter and search for the person in question	
s17(1)(e) PACE	Saving life or limb, or preventing serious damage to property	Enter and search to the extent that is reasonably required for the purpose of saving life or limb, or damage to property, as the case may be	For example, where a burst pipe is flooding another property, or a person inside is believed to be seriously unwell and needs assistance. This power is also extended to PCSOs.
s179 Licensing Act 2003	General power to enter licensed premises	Inspecting to see whether the licence conditions are being observed	This power includes premises temporarily licensed (under a temporary event notice), but does not include members' clubs (the power to enter these is limited to certain situations, see below)
s97 Licensing Act 2003	General power to enter members' clubs where a constable has reason to believe an supply offence under the Misuse of Drugs Act 1971 or Psychoactive Substances Act 2016 is being committed, or there is likely to be a breach of the peace	Enter and search	
s180 Licensing Act 2003	General power to enter any premises where a constable has reason to believe an offence under the Licensing Act 2003 is being committed	Enter and search	
Schedule 11 National Security Act 2003	General power to enter premises in order to search for and/or issue a notice to foreign agents suspected of espionage	Enter and search	

== Other powers ==
=== Road checks ===
A uniformed constable, PCSO or traffic officer may stop any vehicle at any time under section 163 of the Road Traffic Act 1988. However, if a constable wishes, for one of the reasons given below, to stop all vehicles or certain vehicles selected by any criterion, then they must do so under the power granted by section 4 of the Police and Criminal Evidence Act 1984. A road check is normally only authorised by a police officer of the rank of superintendent or above, in which case the restrictions given in the second column apply. However, if it appears to an officer below the rank of superintendent that a road check is required (for one of the reasons below) as a matter of urgency, then he may authorise it himself. In this case, the conditions given in the second column do not apply.

Reason	Conditions for authorisation by superintendent
a person who has committed an offence (other than a road traffic offence or a vehicle excise offence)	if he has reasonable grounds: for believing that the offence is an indictable offence, and; for suspecting that the person is, or is about to be, in the locality in which vehicles would be stopped if the road check were authorised
a person who is a witness to an offence (other than a road traffic offence or a vehicle excise offence)	if he has reasonable grounds for believing that the offence is an indictable offence
a person intending to commit an offence (other than a road traffic offence or a vehicle excise offence)	if he has reasonable grounds: for believing that the offence would be an indictable offence, and; for suspecting that the person is, or is about to be, in the locality in which vehicles would be stopped if the road check were authorised
a person who is unlawfully at large	if he has reasonable grounds for suspecting that the person is, or is about to be, in that locality.

If an officer below the rank of superintendent gives authorisation, it must be referred to a superintendent as soon as it is practicable to do so. Where a superintendent gives authorisation for a road check, he:

- must specify a period, not exceeding seven days, during which the road check may continue, and
- may direct that the road check shall be continuous, or shall be conducted at specified times during that period.

If it appears to an officer of the rank of superintendent or above that a road check ought to continue beyond the period for which it has been authorised he may specify a further period, not exceeding seven days, during which it may continue.

In addition to the powers to conduct road checks given above, the police have a common law power to set up road checks and search vehicles stopped at them in order to prevent a breach of the peace.

=== Removal of disguises ===
Under section 60AA Criminal Justice and Public Order Act 1994, if:

- an authorisation under section 60 of the Act (searching for weapons) is on force, or
- an inspector issues an authorisation under section 60AA on the grounds that he reasonably believes that:
  - activities are going to take place in a certain part of his police area,
  - those activities will involve offences being committed, and
  - to prevent or control those offences it is necessary to order the removal of disguises,

then a Constable in uniform can:

- require a person to remove any item which the Constable reasonably believes that person is wearing wholly or mainly for the purpose of concealing his identity, and
- seize any item which the Constable reasonably believes any person intends to wear wholly or mainly for that purpose.

Authorisations apply to one locality only, last for 24 hours, and the inspector who gives them must inform a superintendent as soon as possible. A superintendent can extend the authorisation for a further 24 hours. Failure to remove a disguise when required is an offence.

=== Power to direct a person to leave ===
A Constable has the power to direct a person to leave a place if he believes that the person is in the place prohibited by a court order or condition as provided by the Section 112 of the Serious Organised Crime and Police Act 2005

A further power to direct someone to leave exists under Section 35 of the Anti-social Behaviour, Crime and Policing Act 2014. This allows a Constable the ability to direct a person to leave if he reasonably suspects the behaviour of the person is causing or likely to cause members of the public in the locality being harassed, alarmed or distressed or that the person will contribute in the locality of crime or disorder. Conditions to this are found under Section 34 & 36.

Other reasons to direct a person or persons to leave an area are also available, e.g. to dissuade someone from committing further offences (as required by Code G of PACE), to prevent someone from obstructing the highway, removing someone from a crime scene, etc.

=== Photographing suspects ===
Section 61 of PACE allows a Constable to take a suspect's fingerprints without consent when he suspects someone has or is committing an offence and there is a doubt about the suspect's name.

=== Power to demand name/address for anti-social behaviour ===
Section 50 of Police Reform Act 2002 allows a Constable in uniform to require a person to give his name and address if they have reason to believe they have been, or are acting in an anti-social manner. This power is also available to PCSOs and others.

The definition of anti-social behavior is provided by Section 2 Anti-social behaviour, Crime and Policing Act 2014:

In this Part "anti-social behaviour" means—

(a) conduct that has caused, or is likely to cause, harassment, alarm or distress to any person,
(b) conduct capable of causing nuisance or annoyance to a person in relation to that person's occupation of residential premises, or

(c) conduct capable of causing housing-related nuisance or annoyance to any person.

== See also ==
- Constable
- Individuals with powers of arrest
- Police officer
- Self-defence in English law
