= Enforcement officer =

Enforcement officer may refer to:

- Bylaw enforcement officer
- Civil enforcement officer
- Civilian enforcement officer
- High Court enforcement officer
- Law enforcement officer
- Parking enforcement officer
