= Sleeping dragon =

Sleeping dragon can refer to:

- Sleeping dragon (manoeuver), a manoeuver employed by protesters.
- Mei long, a troodontid species whose name means "sleeping dragon" in Mandarin.
- Zhuge Liang, the Three Kingdoms-era military strategist also known as "the sleeping dragon".
- The first novel in the fantasy series Guardians of the Flame by Joel Rosenberg
- Broken Sword: The Sleeping Dragon, a 2003 adventure video game and the third game of the Broken Sword series
- Sleeping Dragon, a 2023 full-length album by the singer Sabina Sciubba
