= Custody officer =

A custody officer is an attested constable, in the United Kingdom who works in a custody suite. A custody officer is in charge of the protection and transportation of detainees and/or prisoners between a jail or prison and court. Most custody officers in the United States are also limited commissioned law enforcement officers and can only enforce the laws that directly pertain to custody enforcement.

== England and Wales ==
The appointment, qualifications and duties of custody officers in England and Wales, are regulated by the Police and Criminal Evidence Act 1984 (PACE). The Act stipulates that one or more custody officers must be appointed at each police station designated for the detention of arrested persons. Custody officers are appointed by the chief officer of police of the area, or by another police officer designated by the chief officer for this purpose. To be appointed, the custody officer must be at least of the rank of sergeant, but an officer of any rank may perform the duties if no appointed custody officer is readily available.

The arresting officer – a police constable or any other person with powers of arrest who may use the custody suite – presents the arrested person to the custody officer. The custody officer determines whether there is sufficient evidence to charge the arrested person, and whether there are sufficient grounds for detaining them. If the custody officer has reasonable grounds for believing that these conditions are met, they may authorise the arrested person's detention. The custody officer informs all detained persons of the grounds of their detention.

If there is not insufficient evidence, the custody officer must instead release the arrested person, either on bail or without bail. If detention is necessary to allow the police to secure or preserve evidence, or to obtain evidence by questioning, the custody officer may nevertheless authorise detention even though the requirements have not yet been met.

Detention may also be authorised if the arrested person's identity cannot be ascertained or the custody officer has reasonable grounds for doubting a name or address stated by the arrested person; for reasons of the arrested person's own protection; and for prevention of physical injury to any other person or prevention of loss or damage to property. The custody officer may also authorise detention when they have reasonable grounds to believe that the arrested person will fail to appear in court; risk of interference with the administration of justice, or risk of interference with the investigation of crime.

When the arrested person is a juvenile, the custody officer instead follows the Children and Young Persons Act 1969; they identify and contact a parent, guardian or other person responsible for the welfare of the arrested juvenile; they make arrangements for the juvenile to be taken into the care of the local authority, and, as far as practical, arrange for the juvenile to be detained by the local authority.

The custody officer has the responsibility for all persons detained to be treated according to law and code of practice and for the keeping of custody records, including various requirements regarding time limits. The custody officer must also ensure that during the whole time the person is detained at the custody suite, police officers and police staff who deal with the detained person adhere to the PACE Codes of Practice regarding the rights and treatment of persons arrested.

It is not, however, the custody officer's duty to determine whether the arrest was lawful or not; PACE Codes of Practice code G states that this duty rests on the arresting officer.

== Scotland ==
Under the legal system of Scotland, the custody sergeant (custody supervisor) is the authorising sergeant for the detention of the accused. Under section 7 of the Criminal Justice (Scotland) Act 2016, this is done by the authoriser doing what is called a "section 14 test". If both parts of this test are satisfactory, being necessary and proportionate, and that the subject is sufficiently identified, the detention will proceed.

A person who has been detained or arrested is taken to the nearest custodial police station and the person is booked into custody, often by a member of police staff employed by Scottish police authority called a Criminal Justice Police Custody and Security Officer (CJPCSO) or a police constable or sergeant in smaller more rural custody centres.

The care of people in custody is governed by the Criminal Justice (Scotland) Act 2016, very similar to the Police and Criminal Evidence Act 1984 in force in England and Wales.
