= ACEO =

ACEO may refer to:

- ACEO (brand), a brand name for the NSAID medication Acemetacin
- AC Electro-osmosis, a methodology for Optoelectrofluidics
- Art Cards, Editions and Originals, the Artist trading cards
- Association of Caribbean Electoral Organizations, a component of the International Foundation for Electoral Systems
- Advisory Committee for Earth Observation, a department of the European Space Agency's Mission Science Division
- Associação Comercial e Empresarial de Osasco, a leading company located in Osasco, São Paulo, Brazil

== See also ==
- Ace (disambiguation)
- CEO (disambiguation)
