= Jones' Hill Wood =

Ancient woodland in Buckinghamshire, England

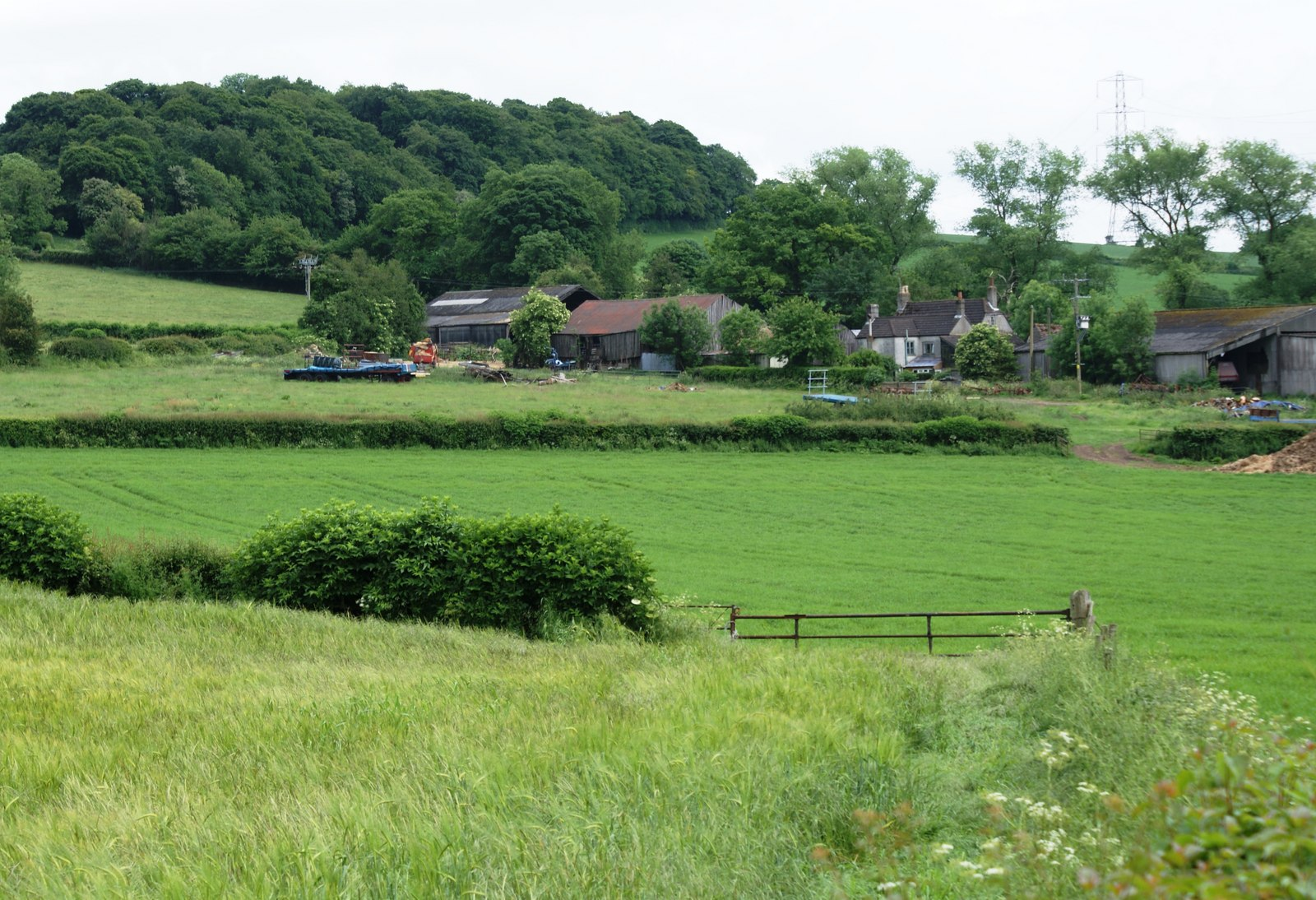
- The wood behind Durham Farm in 2010

- Location within Buckinghamshire
- Interactive map of Jones' Hill Wood

Geography
- Location: Buckinghamshire, England
- Coordinates: 51.7313°N 0.7165°W
- Area: 1.8 hectares (4.4 acres)

Ecology
- Dominant tree species: Beech
- Lesser flora: Bluebell, dog’s mercury, dog’s violet, primrose
- Fauna: Badgers, bats, foxes, tawny owls

Jones' Hill Wood is a 1.8-hectare (4.4-acre) piece of ancient woodland near Wendover in Buckinghamshire, south England. Formed mainly of beech trees, the wood is part of the Chiltern Hills Area of Outstanding Natural Beauty. Almost half of the wood is planned to be chopped down to make way for the route of High Speed 2 (HS2) and the topsoil will be translocated. In October 2020, a protest camp was evicted.

== History ==
Jones' Hill Wood is a 1.8-hectare (4.4-acre) piece of ancient woodland between Great Missenden and Wendover in Buckinghamshire. It is part of the Chiltern Hills Area of Outstanding Natural Beauty. The woods are formed mainly of beech trees and provide a habitat for badgers, bats, foxes, and tawny owls. Lesser flora include bluebells, dog's mercury, dog's violet and primrose. The author Roald Dahl lived nearby in Great Missenden and is said to have drawn on his walks in the woods in Fantastic Mr Fox. Other sources say the inspiration for Fantastic Mr Fox was Angling Spring Wood.

In planning for High Speed 2 (HS2), phase one of which is a railway between Birmingham and London, the clearance of 1 hectare (2.5 acres) was mandated. This was then reduced to 0.7 hectares (1.7 acres) and HS2 plans to plant 4.1 hectares (10 acres) of new woodland in compensation. Thus, almost half of the wood will be chopped down and it is one of 20 ancient woodland sites that HS2 will attempt to translocate, meaning the topsoil will be moved to another place. Natural England, a non-departmental public body, has stated that it is impossible to move ancient woodland.

== Protest camp ==
A tree sitting protest camp was set up in March 2020 in order to stop the demolition of the site. It was evicted in October 2020. On the first day, 40 people were removed from the woods. On the following day, a West Berkshire Council Green party councillor was arrested after he was taken from a tree he had lived in for three months. He then returned to the wood several days later to rejoin seven other activists still in treehouses. After eight days, the last protester to be evicted was veteran environmental activist Swampy, who was taken from an 80-foot (24 m) high treehouse. Along with six other people, he was charged with aggravated trespass.

After the eviction, a report found evidence of rare barbastelle bats living at Jones' Hill Wood. Lawyers requested that HS2 stopped clearing the site until a full survey had been carried out and suggested that the Natural England licence for works did not include destruction of bat habitats.

== Felling ==
Natural England granted HS2 a bat licence in March 2021 to allow destruction of four pipistrelle bat perches and one breeding place. HS2 began felling two thirds of the wood in April 2021 and four protesters were arrested. A local farmer from the Bunce family, after which Dahl named a character in Fantastic Mr Fox, said "It used to be full up with primroses, foxgloves, bluebells, wood anemones, all sorts of things". On 16 April, a High Court judge told HS2 to stop felling trees until at least 24 May, pending the result of an application for a judicial review of Natural England's decision. On 26 April, Mr Justice Holgate then overturned the decision to pause felling.
