= Power of arrest =

Mandate to remove a criminal's liberty

The power of arrest is a mandate given by a central authority that allows an individual to remove a criminal's (or suspected criminal's) liberty. The power of arrest can also be used to protect a person, or persons from harm or to protect damage to property. However, in many countries, a person also has powers of arrest under citizen's arrest or any person arrest / breach of the peace arrest powers.

== Individuals with powers of arrest ==
Originally, powers of arrest were confined to sheriffs in England for a local area. Over the past few hundred years, the legal power of arrest has gradually expanded to include a large number of people/officials, the majority of which have come to the fore more recently. These various individuals all may utilise similar or different powers of arrest, but generally adhere to one particular field.

The individuals below have been listed in order of when the power of arrest became available to the individual, starting from the earliest.

=== United Kingdom ===
==== England & Wales ====
The following individuals all have various powers of arrest or detention within England & Wales in various capacities using the following legislation/law:

- Members of public ("Other persons" i.e. anyone who is not a constable):
  - Common law – to prevent a Breach of the Peace
  - s24A Police and Criminal Evidence Act 1984
- N.B. s24A is only for criminal offences not limited to summary trial alone
- Police Constables:
  - Common law – to prevent a Breach of the Peace
  - Section 49 of the Prison Act 1952
  - Section 32 Children & Young Persons Act 1969
  - Immigration Act 1971
  - Section 7 of the Bail Act 1976
  - Section 1 & Section 13 of the Magistrates' Courts Act 1980 (warrants)
  - Section 136 of the Mental Health Act 1983
  - Section 24 Police Criminal Evidence Act 1984
  - Section 46A Police Criminal Evidence Act 1984
  - Section 31 Police Criminal Evidence Act 1984
  - Section 6D of the Road Traffic Act 1988
  - Section 41 of the Terrorism Act 2000
  - Section 9 of the Anti-social Behaviour, Crime and Policing Act 2014
  - Section 27 of the National Security Act 2003
- National Crime Agency (formerly SOCA) officer:
  - s46 Serious Organised Crime and Police Act 2005
- N.B. NCA agents possess powers of immigration, customs and excise and Police constable simultaneously)
- Police Community Support Officers (PCSOs):
  - Common law – to prevent a Breach of the Peace
  - s24A Police Criminal Evidence Act 1984
  - Power to detain under Police Reform Act 2002
- Immigration Officer (formerly UK Border Agency):
  - s28a Immigration Act 1971
  - schedule 2, paragraph 17(1) Immigration Act 1971
  - s23 UK Borders Act 2007
- HMRC Criminal Investigation Officers
- Service Police (RMP/RAFP/RNP):
  - s67/69 Armed Forces Act 2006
- HMP Prison officers
- Civilian enforcement officers:
  - s125A Magistrates' Courts Act 1980
  - Schedule 4A Magistrates' Courts Act 1980
- N.B. These powers/functions can be outsourced to a 3rd party firm as per Schedule 4A
- Church Warden
  - s3 Ecclesiastical Courts Jurisdiction Act 1860
- Court bailiff
- Court officer
- Court security officer
  - s53 Courts Act 2003 (power to restrain and remove)
- Sheriff (Sheriffs Act 1887)
- Serjeant at Arms of the House of Commons
- "Officer or agent"
  - s156 Companies Clauses Consolidation Act 1845
  - Part 4 – Chapter 19 -–Rule 4.2111 Insolvency Rules 1986
- Epping Forest Keepers (park rangers)
- Environment Agency officer
- Water bailiff
- IPCC investigators
  - Police Reform Act 2002

=== United States ===
In the United States, various law enforcement officers are able to legally arrest people. Due to the complexity of the American civil legal system, including the interactions between federal, state, county, and local jurisdictions, there are numerous special cases that apply, depending on the reason for the arrest.

== See also ==
- Citizen's arrest
- Breach of the peace
- Powers of the police in England and Wales
- Powers of the police in Scotland
