= CEO (disambiguation) =

CEO, or chief executive officer, is the highest-ranking corporate officer of an organization.

CEO or ceo may also refer to:

== Abbreviations and codes ==
- CEO (Data General), or Comprehensive Electronic Office, a 1981 suite of office automation software
- Center for Equal Opportunity, an American conservative think tank
- Chief Electoral Officer (disambiguation), the person responsible for overseeing elections in some commonwealth countries and provinces
- Chief experimental officer, the head of an experimental organization, especially in the military or civil service
- Civil enforcement officer, a person employed to enforce parking and traffic laws
- Civilian enforcement officer, an employee or authorised officer of His Majesty's Courts & Tribunals Service
- Community Effort Orlando, an annual fighting game event
- Corporate Europe Observatory, a nonprofit research and campaign group
- Waco Kungo Airport, Angola (IATA code: CEO)

== Arts and entertainment ==
- Ceo (musician), the solo project of Eric Berglund
- "C.E.O." (song), a 2026 single by Weezer
- "CEO", a 2021 song by Netta Barzilai
- "CEO", a 2021 song by Snoop Dogg from From tha Streets 2 tha Suites
- The CEO, a 2016 Nigerian film

== See also ==
- Ceos, the Latin name for the Greek island of Kea in the Cyclades archipelago in the Aegean Sea
- Committee on Earth Observation Satellites, an international organization
- Child Exploitation and Obscenity Section, of the United States Department of Justice Criminal Division
- CE (disambiguation)
