= Lock-on (protest tactic) =

Protest tactic

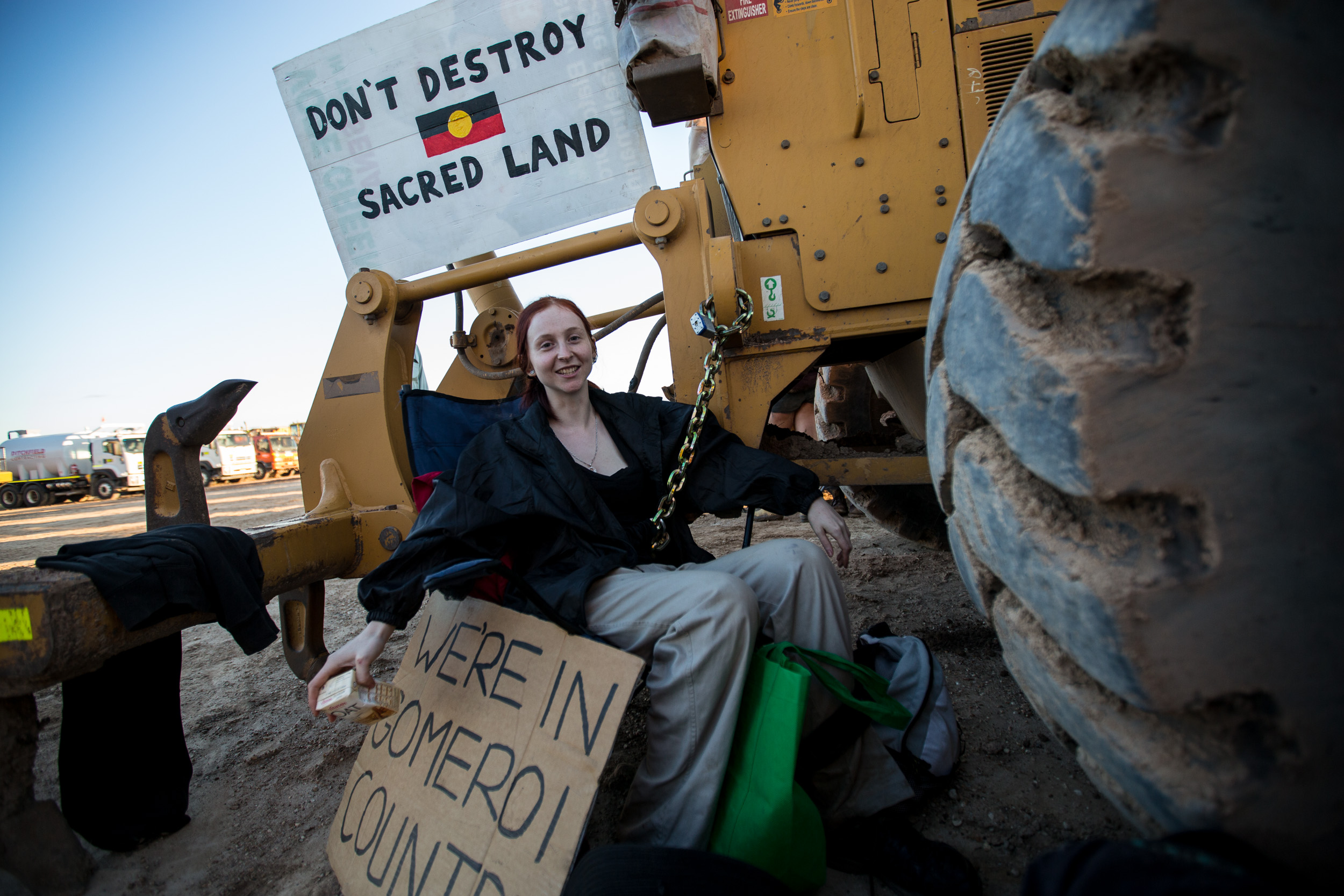
A protester locked onto heavy earthmoving equipment in Maules Creek coal mine, Australia

A lock-on is a technique used by protesters to make it difficult to remove them from their place of protest. It often involves improvised or specially designed and constructed hardware, although a basic lock-on is the human chain which relies simply on hand grip.

== Objective ==
In American protest movements dating from the 1960s and 1970s, the term lockdown applies to a person's attaching themself to a building, object, fence or other immobile object.

The safe removal of the protesters necessitates the involvement of skilled technicians, and is often time-consuming.

The lock-on chosen by the protester may be the difference between being arrested or not, or may vary the kind or number of charges brought against them by the police. If a protester can remove themselves when asked to by the police, they may stand a better chance of not being arrested. However, if they can remove themselves and they choose not to, they may receive a charge for refusing to remove themselves from the lock-on.

Locking on is a very successful means of slowing down operations that are perceived by the protesters to be illegal or immoral. It is also often used to allow time for journalists to arrive to record the scene and take statements from the group's spokespeople.

== Devices ==
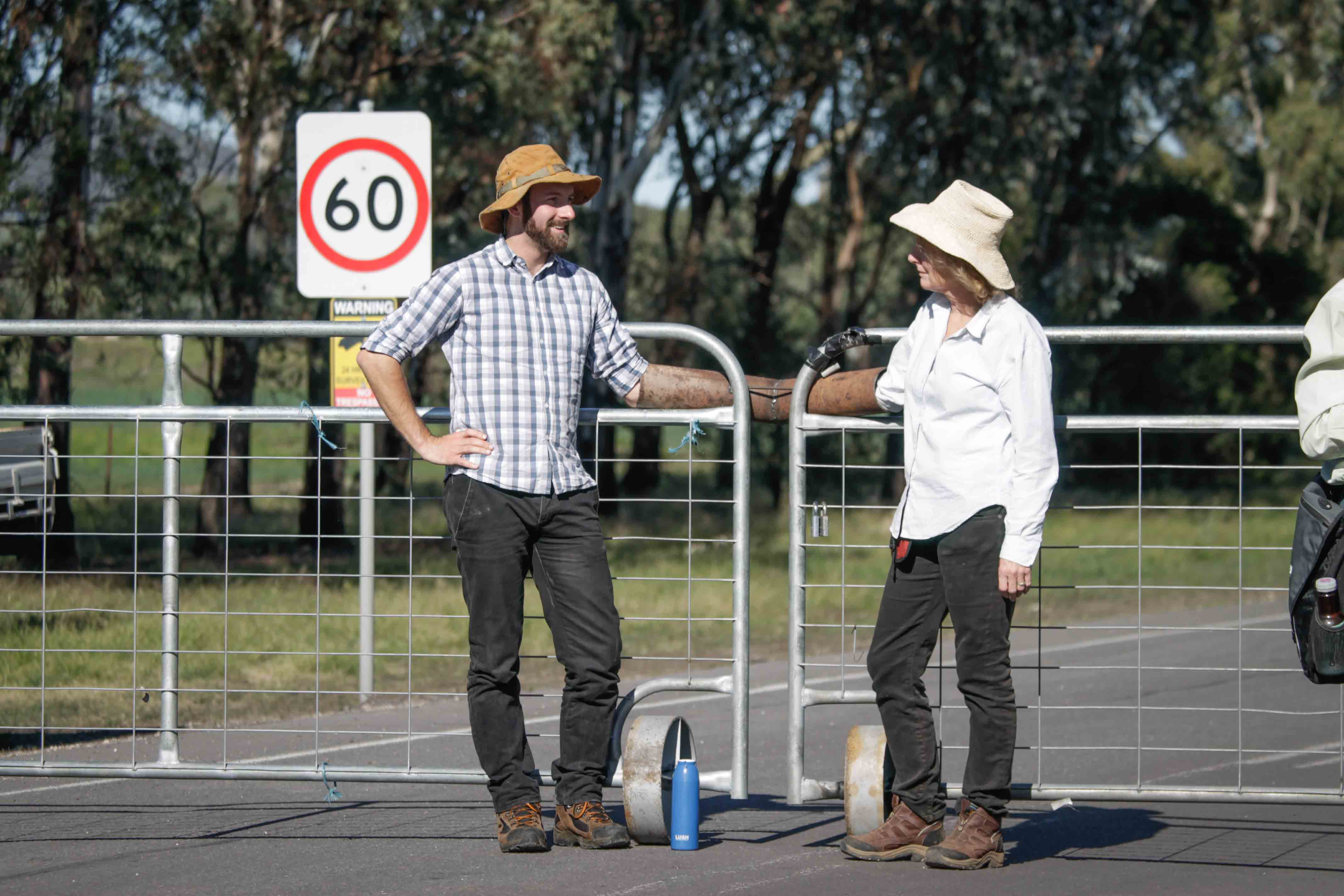
Two protestors locked to a gate with a V arm tube.

Lock-ons were originally performed with chains and handcuffs, but other devices have been introduced, including tripods and tubes or pipes with handholds built in to link a person to an object or to create chains of people. Other common hardware includes padlocks, U-locks and other bicycle locks, lockboxes and tripods and platforms and other rigging in tree sitting.

A more complicated lock-on is the sleeping dragon, which involves protesters putting their limbs through pipes containing concrete, or a mixture of steel and concrete, and is only limited by the imagination and ingenuity of those making the lock-on. The protester can choose between a type that will allow them to willingly remove themselves or a type that requires machinery to remove them. Devices can be buried as an additional barrier to removal. A car dragon is a car concreted into place after removing the wheels, where protestors can then lock-on to a further device fixed to the car.

== Opposition in law ==
In the United Kingdom in May 2023, the Public Order Act 2023 made it a criminal offence for a person to "attach themselves to another person, to an object or to land" with the intention of causing serious disruption. "Going equipped" with such an aim was also criminalised.

== See also ==
- Blockade
- Human chain
- Tree sitting
- Sleeping dragon (manoeuver)
- Swampy
