= Protest tunnelling in the United Kingdom =

Form of protest involving the construction of subterranean tunnels

Protest tunnelling in the United Kingdom is a form of protest involving the construction of subterranean tunnels. It is typically used against the development of new road and transport infrastructure projects.

Protest tunnelling has been utilised by protestors since the 1990s in the United Kingdom. Protests against the construction of the Newbury bypass and the extension of the A30 road in Fairmile, Devon used tunnels. The activist Swampy was the last to emerge from the tunnel built to protest the A30, having been underground for seven days.

Tunnelling is an effective tactic against developments as the time and cost of removing protestors from them can be prohibitive; it is comparatively easy for bailiffs to remove ground encampments and tree houses built by protestors. Construction machinery cannot drive on ground that has been tunnelled without a risk to the protestors within.

The construction of tunnels to protest was inspired by the Củ Chi tunnels built by the Viet Cong's for the Tết Offensive of the Vietnam War in 1968.

== Notable protest tunnels ==
- 1996 — Newbury bypass in Berkshire
- 1997 — Against a second runway at Manchester Airport
- March 1999 — To protest a planned leisure complex development in Crystal Palace Park, London
- 2013 — A tunnel was built to protest the Bexhill-to-Hastings Link Road
- 2021 — A 100 ft tunnel was built under Euston Square Gardens by HS2 Rebellion to protest the construction of a taxi rank that would serve the expansion of Euston railway station for High Speed 2.
- 2022 — A 40m long tunnel was built near Swynnerton as part of protests against High Speed 2.
