= Criminal Justice (Scotland) Act 2016 =

Act of the Scottish Parliament

Criminal Justice (Scotland) Act 2016 (Note: Section 118.)
- Act of the Scottish Parliament
- Scottish Parliament
- Long title: An Act of the Scottish Parliament to make provision about criminal justice including as to police powers and rights of suspects and as to criminal evidence, procedure and sentencing; to establish the Police Negotiating Board for Scotland; and for connected purposes.
- Citation: 2016 asp 1
- Introduced by: Kenny MacAskill MSP
- Territorial extent: Scotland

Dates
- Royal assent: 13 January 2016
- Commencement: various (Note: Section 117.)

Other legislation
- Amends: Trespass (Scotland) Act 1865; Child Abduction Act 1984; Legal Aid (Scotland) Act 1986; Protection of Badgers Act 1992; Criminal Law (Consolidation) (Scotland) Act 1995; Criminal Procedure (Scotland) Act 1995; Terrorism Act 2000; Fireworks Act 2003
- Amended by: Domestic Abuse (Scotland) Act 2018

Status: Amended

History of passage through the Parliament

Text of statute as originally enacted

Revised text of statute as amended

Text of the Criminal Justice (Scotland) Act 2016 as in force today (including any amendments) within the United Kingdom, from legislation.gov.uk.

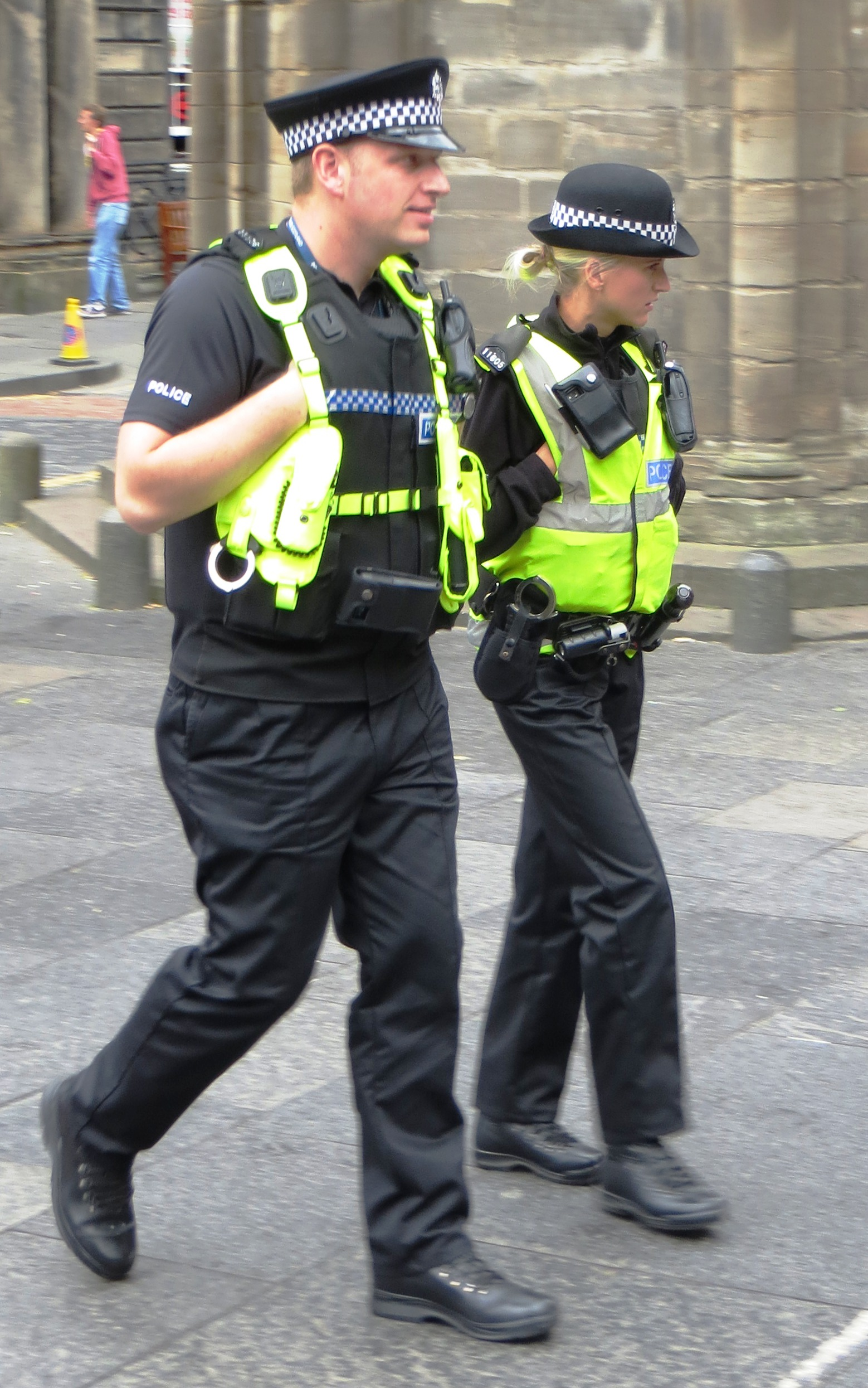
Police officers wearing uniform in Edinburgh

The Criminal Justice (Scotland) Act 2016 (asp 1) is an act of the Scottish Parliament which reformed criminal practice and procedure in Scotland. The act was intended to "modernise and enhance the efficiency of the Scottish criminal justice system".

== Background ==
In October 2010, following the ruling in Cadder v HM Advocate, a Supreme Court judgement ruling the lack of access to a solicitor in law for persons detained by police under section 14(1) of the Criminal Procedure (Scotland) Act 1995 unlawful, the Scottish Government asked the Lord President to nominate a single High Court judge to lead an independent review of Scottish criminal law and practice. The Lord President of the Court of Session at the time, Lord Hamilton, subsequently nominated Lord Carloway, who was himself appointed Lord President in 2015. The Carloway Review was subsequently published on 17 November 2011, and its recommendations led to the introduction of the Criminal Justice (Scotland) Bill before the Scottish Parliament by Kenny MacAskill MSP, Cabinet Secretary for Justice for the Scottish Government on 20 June 2013.

The Criminal Justice (Scotland) Bill was passed by the Scottish Parliament on 8 December 2015, and received royal assent on 13 January 2016. The act came into force in various stages between 2016 and 2019, with subsequent amendments.

== Contents ==
Part 1 of the act reforms the powers of the police in Scotland in relation to arrest and detention. Previous common law powers of arrest and separate statutory powers of detention were replaced by section 1 of the Criminal Justice (Scotland) Act 2016, a single statutory power of arrest similar to section 24 of the Police and Criminal Evidence Act 1984 in England and Wales. Section 3 provides that all persons arrested under section 1 are cautioned and told of the reason for their arrest. Part 1 of the act also ensured that all persons in police custody are provided with the right to access a solicitor, after the ruling in the case of Cadder v HM Advocate, which preceded the Carloway Review. Furthermore, section 50 of the act places a duty onto the police to ensure that a person is not "unreasonably or unnecessarily held in police custody".

Part 2 of the act introduces new legislation in relation to the use of stop and search by police in Scotland. It abolishes a 'voluntary stop and search', where a person was able to voluntarily submit themselves to a stop and search by police. This police power had proved controversial in its use, particularly on children, in the years leading up to its abolition. The act provides that police only have the power to stop and search any person in accordance with a legal power to do so or a warrant enabling them to do so. This was enshrined in the Code of Practice on the Exercise by Constables of Powers of Stop and Search of the Person in Scotland, brought into force by section 77 of the act on 11 May 2017.

The act also fulfilled a promise by the Scottish Government to increase the maximum sentence for possession of an offensive weapon, as well as having an article with a blade or point, under the Criminal Law (Consolidation) (Scotland) Act 1995.
