= Sleeping dragon (manoeuver) =

Maneuver used by protesters to cause disruption

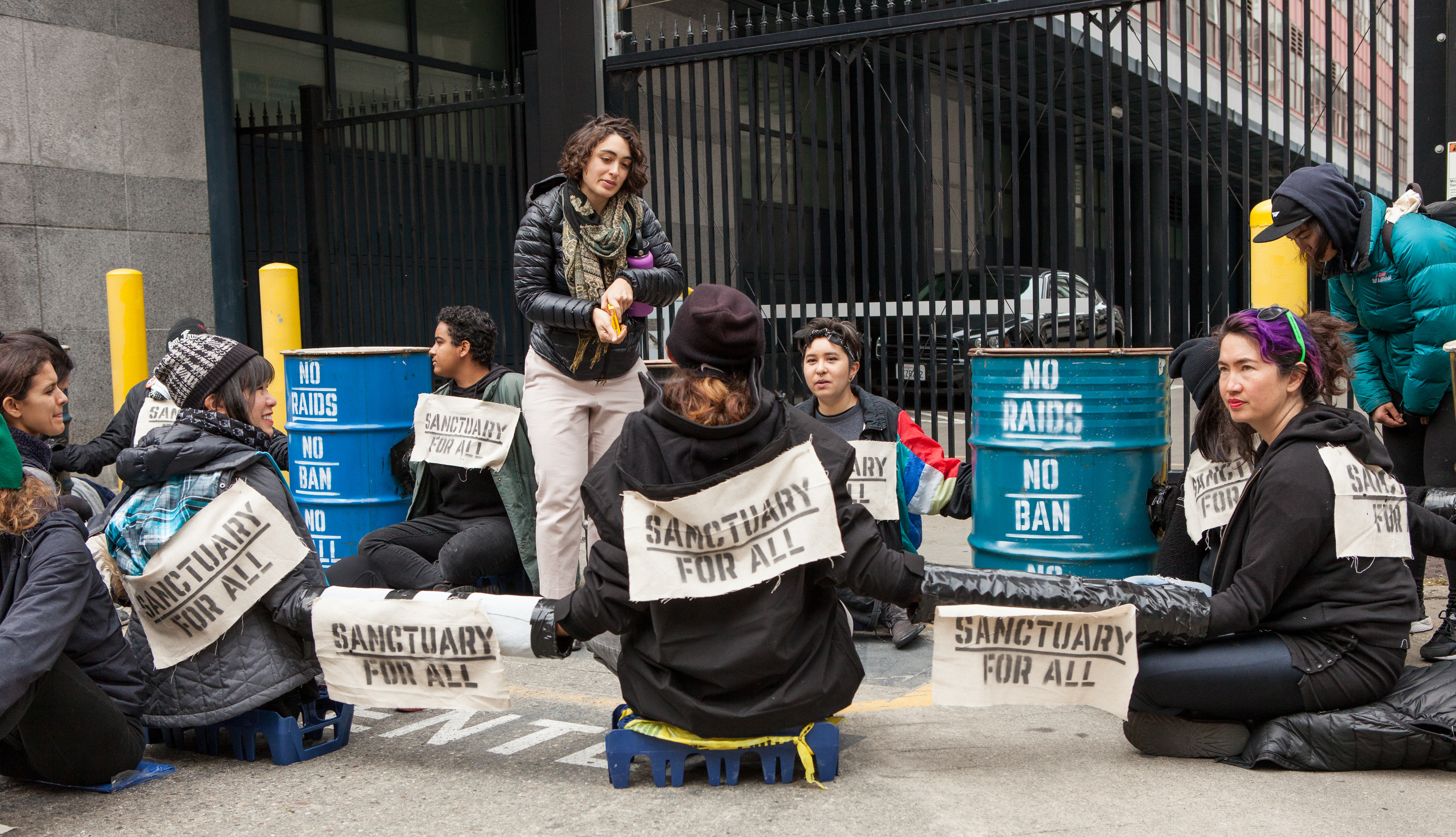
A sleeping dragon protest in February 2018. Protestors have locked arms through a combination of pipes and barrels.

A sleeping dragon is a maneuver used by protesters to hinder their removal from a protest site. A series of protesters are handcuffed together through PVC pipe, which prevents police from simply using bolt cutters to break the handcuffs. Advanced variations include covering the PVC pipe with elements which might make it more difficult to break. Examples include chicken wire, tar, and duct tape. Another variation is filling a barrel with concrete and putting the PVC pipe through the barrel such that it cannot be accessed without first destroying all of the concrete.

Often the protesters will chain, lock, or otherwise secure themselves to immovable objects, resulting in a difficult-to-remove human obstacle. This is typically accomplished best with carabiners tied to their wrists so that the protestors can easily unlock themselves, though they cannot be unlocked by outsiders.

== Removal methods ==
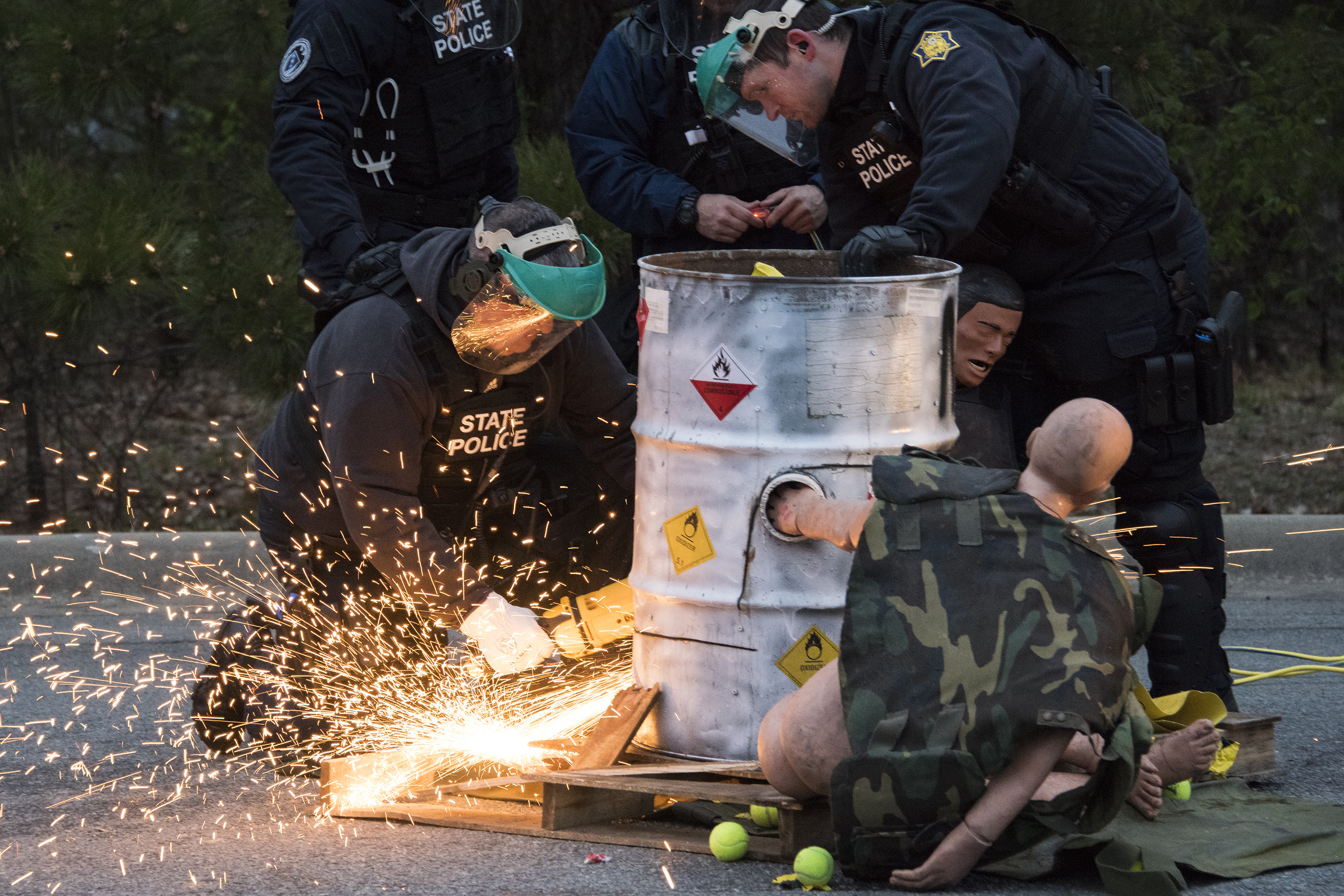
Arkansas State Police officers being trained in the removal of a sleeping dragon, using mannequins.

It is sometimes impossible for officers to know what is inside the sleeping dragon without cutting into it. Officers may cut into the pipe with such tools as an angle grinder, rotary saw, or whizzer saw, followed by a pry bar and pliers; or in the case of concrete, chipping hammers, hammer drills, and breakers. Abrasive saws, a band saw, and an angle grinder may be used on steel pipes. Officers may put fire retardant hoods and earmuffs on the protesters to protect them from sparks and noise as tools are used to cut through the sleeping dragon.

Once an inspection hole has been made, it may be possible to reach in with bolt cutters and cut the handcuff chain.

In 2018, Seattle police established an Apparatus Removal Team (ART) in response to sleeping dragon protests, its officers being trained and equipped to cut through plastic and metal without injuring protesters. Their approach involves cutting into tubing and placing a brightly colored piece of plastic against the protester's skin, so that the blade will produce visible plastic shavings before it can cause any injury.

== See also ==
- Blockade
- Human chain
- Lock-on (protest tactic)
- Swampy
- Tree sitting
