= Children and Young Persons Act =

Children and Young Persons Act may refer to

- Children and Young Persons Act 1933, an Act of the Parliament of the United Kingdom
- Child and Young Persons (Amendment) Act 1952, an Act of the Parliament of the United Kingdom
- Children and Young Persons (Harmful Publications) Act 1955, an Act of the Parliament of the United Kingdom
- Children and Young Persons Act 1956, an Act of the Parliament of the United Kingdom
- Children and Young Persons Act 1963, an Act of the Parliament of the United Kingdom
- Children and Young Persons (Care and Protection) Act 1998, New South Wales legislation
- Children and Young Persons Act 2008, an Act of the Parliament of the United Kingdom
