= Swampy (environmentalist) =

British environmental activist (born 1973)

- Born: Daniel Marc Hooper; 1973 (age 52–53); Luton, Bedfordshire, England
- Occupation: Forester
- Years active: 1996–2021
- Employer: Forestry Commission
- Known for: Protest tunnelling
- Movement: Environmental
- Children: 3

Swampy is the nickname of Daniel Marc Hooper (born 1973), a British environmental activist. He was involved in a number of environmental protests in the 1990s, becoming nationally famous after spending a week in a tunnel aiming to stop the expansion of the A30 in Fairmile, Devon, in 1996. In 2020, he was arrested attempting to stop the destruction of Jones Hill Wood for High Speed 2 (HS2) and then joined a Stop HS2 protest at Euston Square Gardens in London.

== Activism ==
Swampy became a nationally known figure in 1996 after spending a week in a complex series of tunnels dug in the path of a new extension to the A30 in Fairmile, Devon, resisting attempts at eviction by police. Specialists were called in to safely remove Swampy and other protesters locked deep inside the network of artificial tunnels. Several people took part in the protest, but Swampy was the last one to be evicted. The magistrate passing sentence on him was David Cameron's mother. The mainstream media became fascinated with Swampy, and his subsequent fame included an appearance on the BBC comedy current affairs quiz Have I Got News for You, as the show's youngest-ever panelist. A folk song was written about him, entitled "The Fairmile Road Protest Song (Digging Down)". He also protested against the Newbury bypass, and in 1997, he entered tunnels intended to prevent the building of a second runway at Manchester Airport. He then dropped out of sight and refused to talk to the media.

In 2007, the Sunday Mirror newspaper reported that Swampy was taking part in the climate change protests at Heathrow Airport. His presence on the protest site was dependent on his keeping a low profile, so his celebrity status would not detract from the event. In September 2019, Swampy took part in an Extinction Rebellion protest, attaching himself to a concrete block at the entrance to the Valero Energy fuel refinery in Pembrokeshire. He admitted to a charge of wilful obstruction of the highway and was fined £40, plus £85 for costs and a £32 surcharge, commenting, "I am pleading guilty, I can't really afford to keep coming to court."

Swampy was arrested at Jones Hill Wood in Buckinghamshire in October 2020, having occupied a tree house as part of a Stop HS2 protest to prevent trees being felled because they are on the route of High Speed 2. In January 2021, he was involved in the construction and occupation of tunnels at Euston Square Gardens in London as part of the same protests. His 16 year-old son joined him in the tunnel protest. Swampy left the tunnel on 25 February. He and others again built and occupied a tunnel on the site of HS2 work in Wendover, Buckinghamshire, emerging on 13 November 2021. They spent 35 days holding out against the national eviction team, 28 of those days completely underground.

== Personal life ==
Swampy was born in 1973 in Luton, Bedfordshire, England. In 2006, he was living with his girlfriend and their three children in a yurt, a dome-shaped tent, in Tipi Valley, a commune in Carmarthenshire, Wales. As of 2013, he was still living in Wales with his family, working for the Forestry Commission and running marathons and half marathons.

== See also ==
- Environmental direct action in the United Kingdom
