= Fairmile, Devon =

Hamlet in Devon, England

Fairmile
- Hamlet
- Interactive map of Fairmile
- Coordinates: 50.7666°N 3.2958°W
- Country: England
- County: Devon
- Civil Parish: Talaton and Ottery St Mary

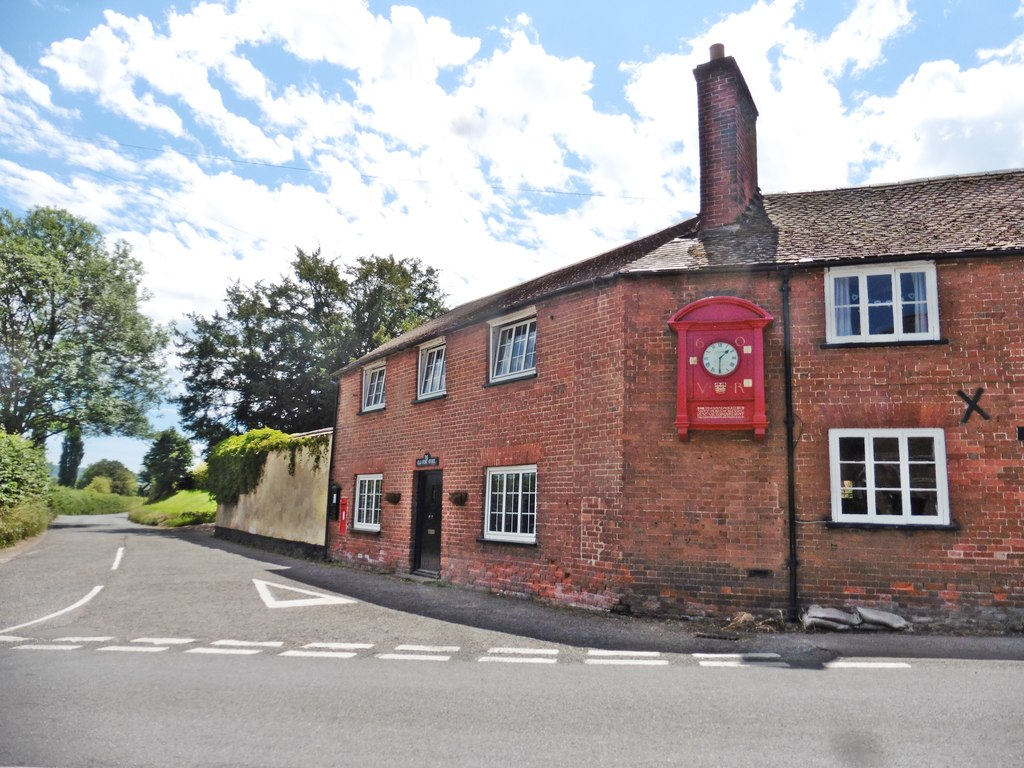
Former Post Office, Fairmile

Fairmile is a hamlet in the English county of Devon. In the late 1990s, Fairmile became a focus of direct action protest activities, as squatters attempted to stop the construction of the A30 link road between Honiton and Exeter.

== Hamlet ==
Fairmile lies 160 miles (260 km) from London, between Ottery St Mary and Collumpton. Fairmile belongs partly to the civil parish of Talaton and partly to Ottery St Mary. Its name (and the name of the pub) is reported to be taken from the road being a "fair mile" as opposed to other bad roads locally.

The hamlet consists of land slightly smaller than the villages mentioned, but informally distinguished from them, a handful of houses, including the Fairmile Inn (now closed), a boarding cattery (Fairmile Cat Hotel est. 2010), a disused post office and a former blacksmith's workshop. About 400 yards (400 m) away is Escot Church, built in 1840 by Sir John Kennaway, the owner of nearby Escot House.

== Road protest ==
In an attempt to stop the construction of the A30 link road between Honiton and Exeter, Fairmile became the main focus of direct action protest activities. There were permanent camps for several years known as Fort Trollheim, Fairmile and Allercombe. They included a number of tree houses and networks of tunnels and bunkers. Allercombe was first to be evicted, then Trollheim on 13 January 1997. A force of 200 police officers and bailiffs came to evict Fairmile early in the morning of 30 January. Seventeen people were arrested above ground, leaving the people in the tunnel who were evicted over the next week by experts. This was amid considerable national publicity, and led to the temporary celebrity status of the final occupant of one of the tunnels, Daniel Hooper, known by his nickname 'Swampy'. Protestors had moved onto Fairmile after opposing the Newbury bypass and went on to other sites such as the Bingley Relief Road (part of the A650), the Birmingham Northern Relief Road and the Weymouth Relief Road (part of the A354).
