= Euston Square Gardens =

Coordinates: 51°31′39″N 0°07′54″W

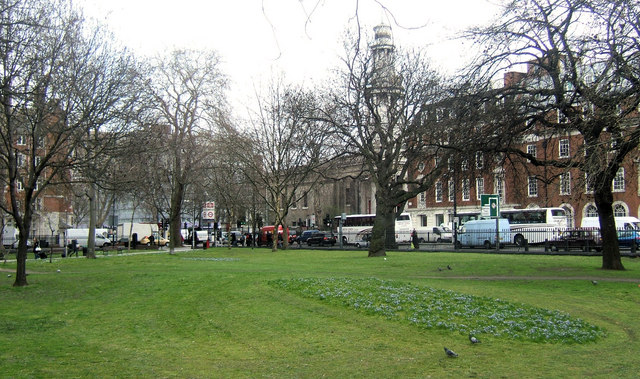
The gardens in March 2008

Euston Square Gardens is a public garden on Euston Road in the London Borough of Camden.

The gardens are the northern gardens of the former residential Euston Square, the southern gardens were renamed Endsleigh Gardens.

The gardens are enclosed by railings and covered with grass and London plane trees. The two lodges at the gardens date from 1870 and were once the entrance to Euston station. They are inscribed with the names of the London and North Western Railway.

A worksite for High Speed 2 and the proposed Euston St Pancras railway station is situated at the gardens. This is to construct an underground pedestrian link between Euston railway station and Euston Square tube station.

== Protest ==
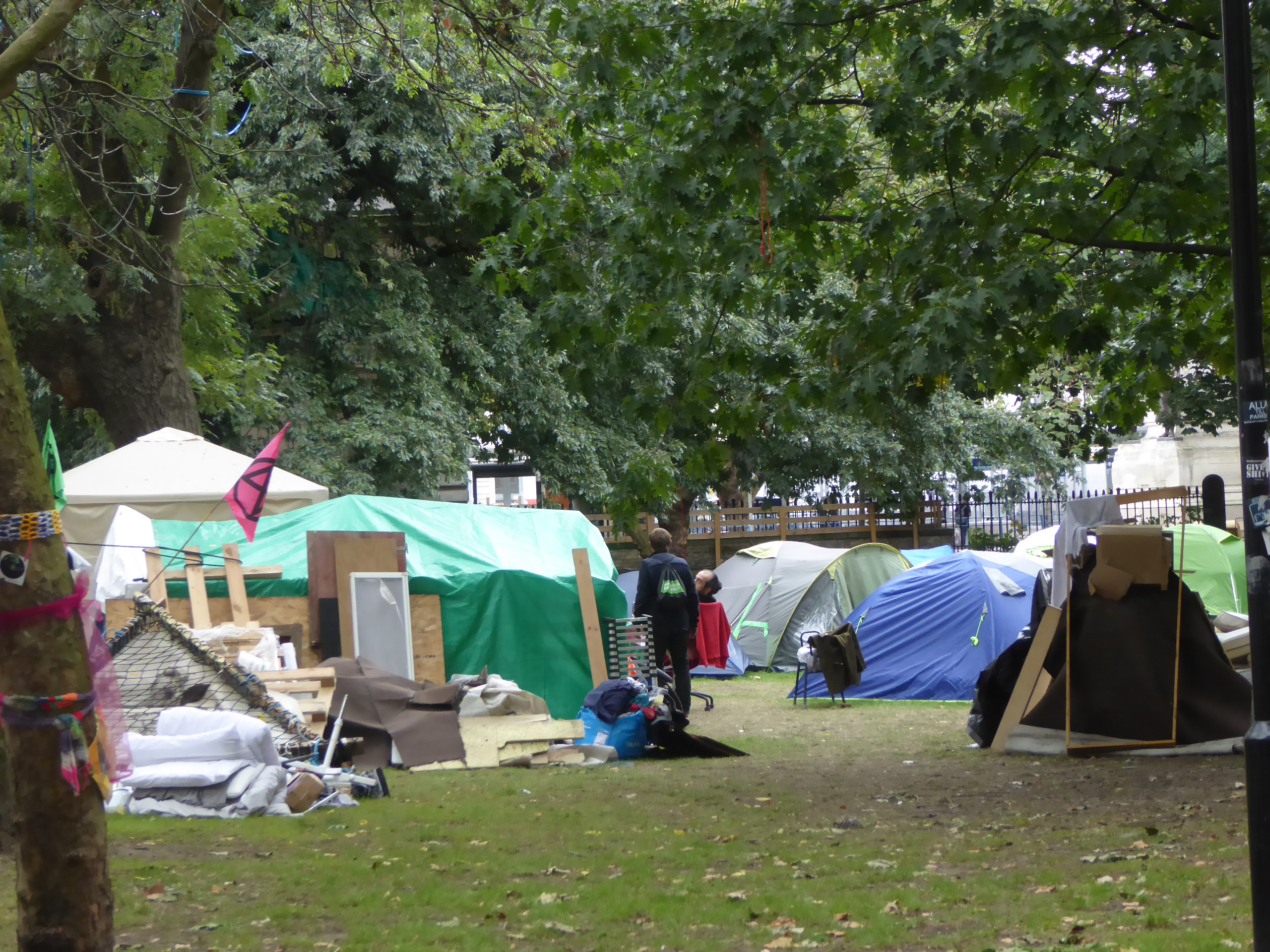
HS2 protesters in September 2020

A protest camp against HS2 was set up in the park in September 2020. This included a tall construction made largely of pallets that the protestors dubbed “Buckingham Pallets”.

It was revealed in January 2021 that protesters had built a 100ft tunnel under the gardens as part of protests against the planned High Speed 2 railway. Nine activists occupied the tunnels starting 27 January as part of the protest. The first protester left the tunnel on February 5 A second protester left on the 6th. A third left on the 15th and a fourth on the 17th. A 5th was evicted on the 23rd and a further 3 left on the 25th. The final protester left on the 26th.

In March, a freedom of information request revealed that the Metropolitan Police had spent £140,000 on policing the tunnels during the removal of the protesters.

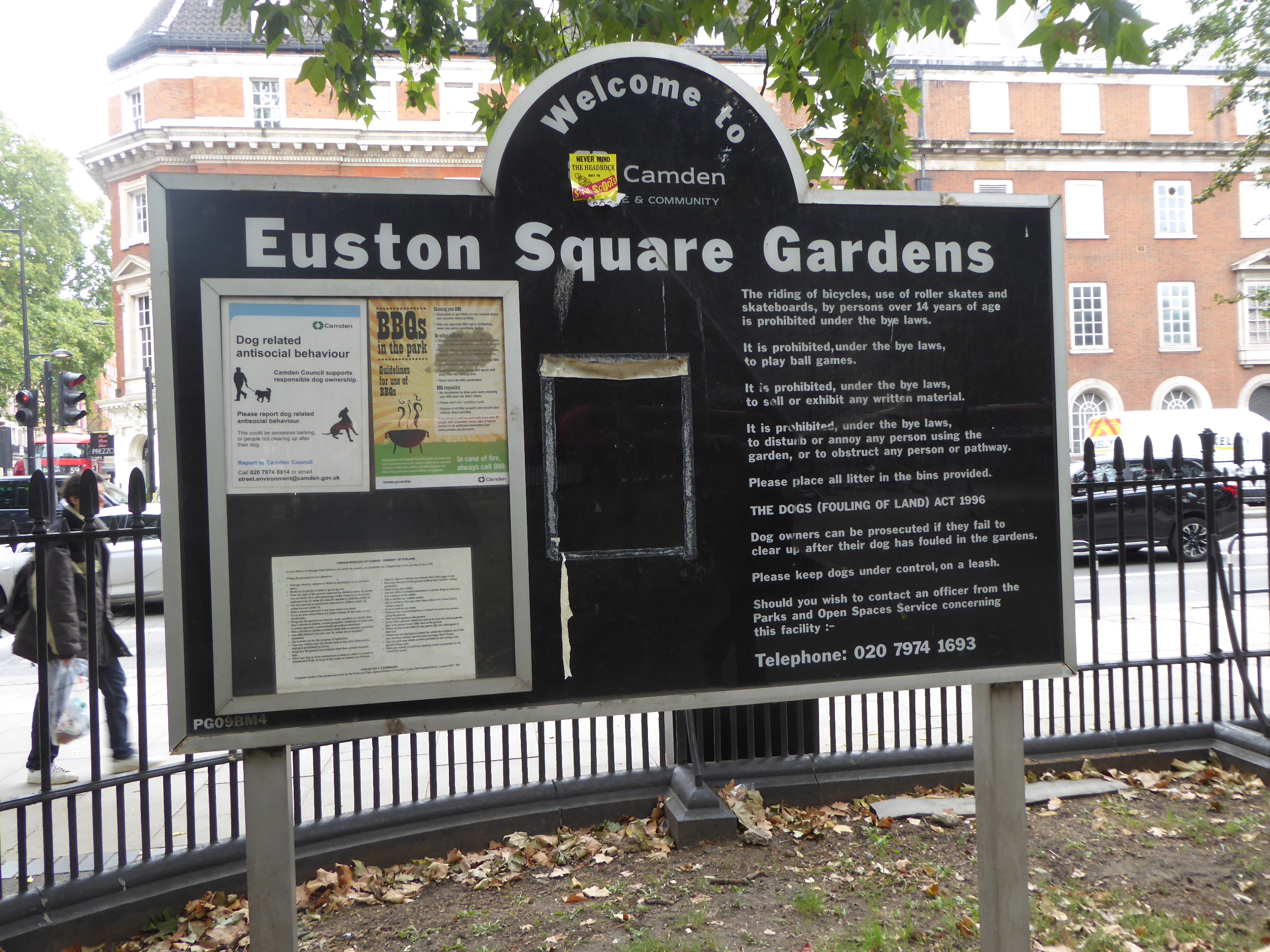
Euston Square Gardens sign in 2020

== Historic maps ==
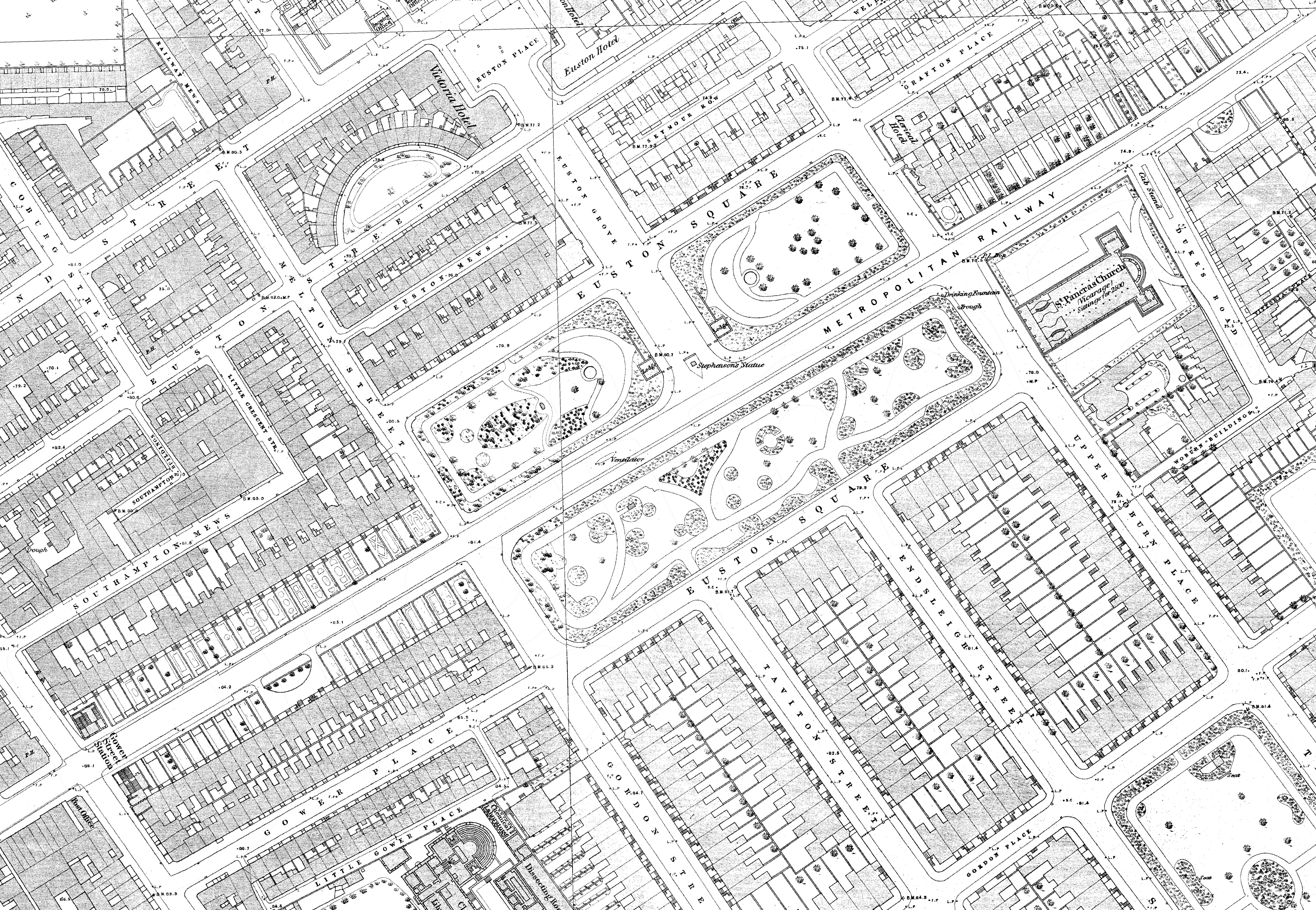
The East and West Euston Square Gardens at the centre of an 1874 Ordnance Survey map

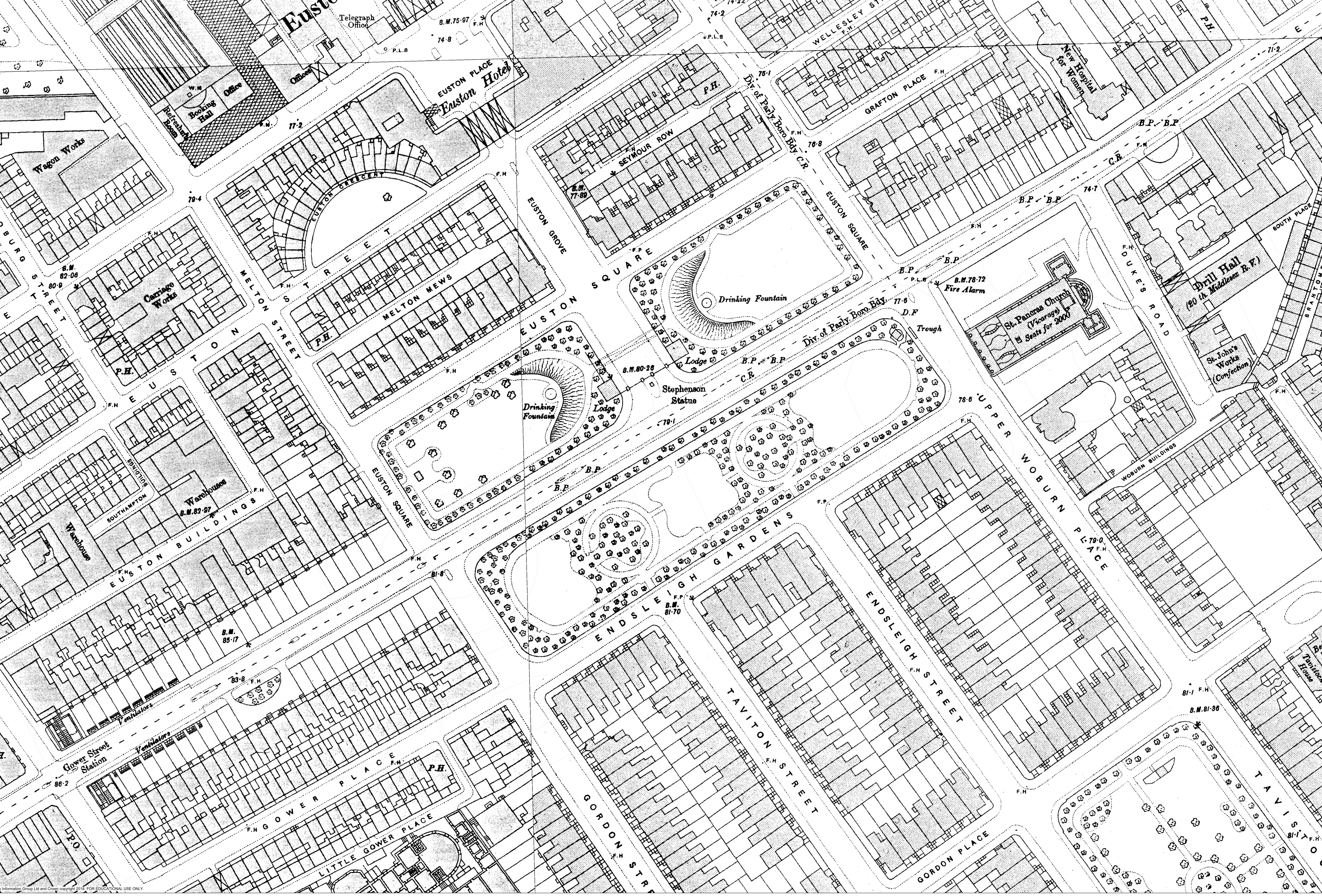
The evolution of the gardens are visible on this 1895 Ordnance Survey map after renaming

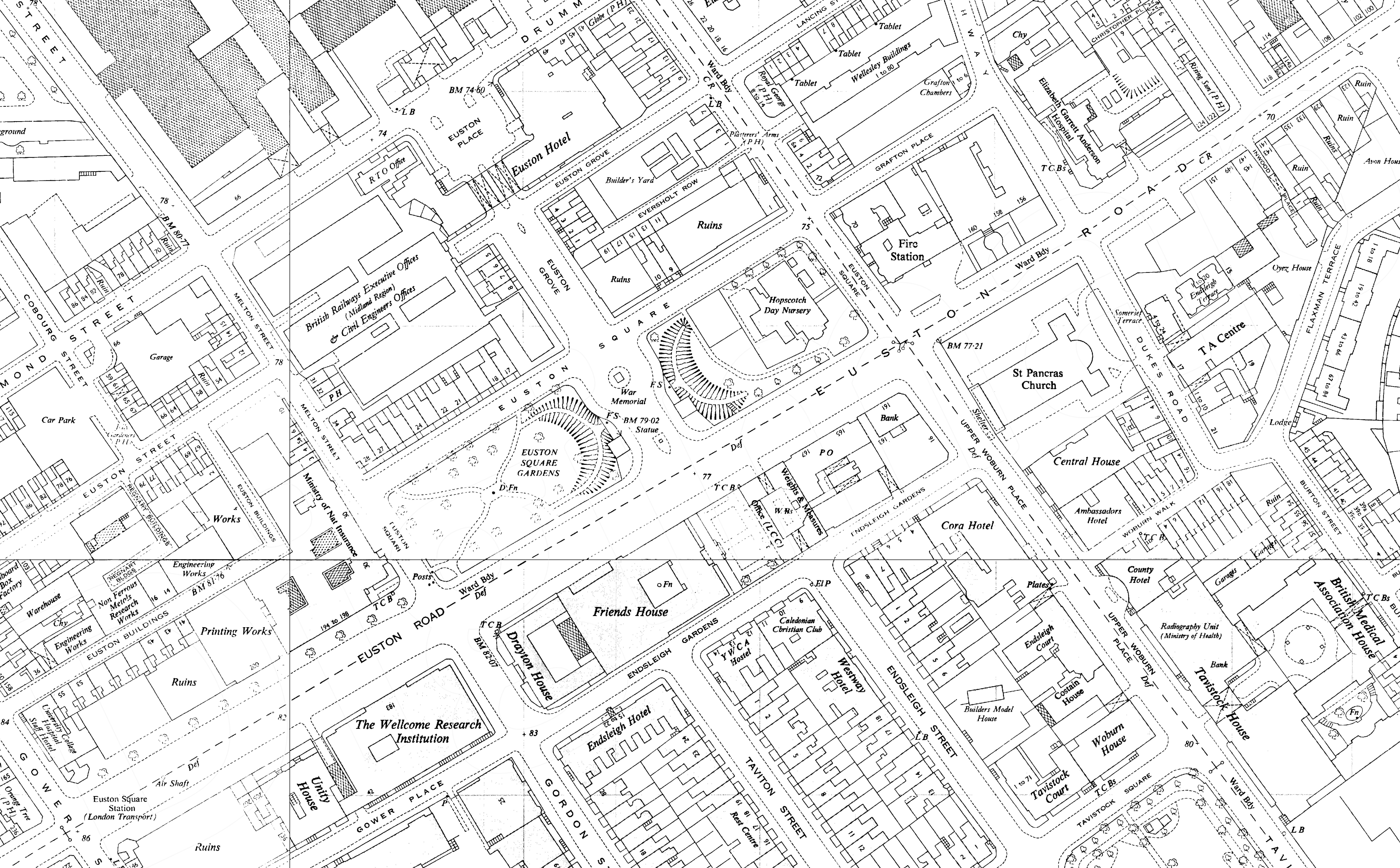
The encroaching boundaries of Euston railway station to the gardens are visible on this 1953 Ordnance Survey map
