= Angling Spring Wood =

Wood in Great Missenden, Buckinghamshire, England

- Location within Buckinghamshire
- Interactive map of Angling Spring Wood

Geography
- Location: Buckinghamshire, England
- Coordinates: 51°42′2.49″N 0°43′5.81″W
- Area: 16.37 hectares (40.5 acres)

Angling Spring Wood is in Great Missenden, Buckinghamshire, England with an area of 16.37 hectares (40.5 acres). It is owned by Chiltern District Council. The woodland is located close to Gipsy House, the former residence of Roald Dahl. The author regularly walked in the woods, gaining inspiration to write Danny, the Champion of the World and Fantastic Mr Fox.
