= Crossbows Act 1987 =

Act of the Parliament of the United Kingdom

Crossbows Act 1987 (Note: Section 8(1).)
- Act of Parliament
- Parliament of the United Kingdom
- Long title: An Act to create offences relating to the sale and letting on hire of crossbows to, and the purchase, hiring and possession of crossbows by, persons under the age of seventeen; and for connected purposes.
- Citation: 1987 c. 32
- Territorial extent: England and Wales; Scotland; Northern Ireland (sections 7–8); (Note: Section 8(3).)

Dates
- Royal assent: 15 May 1987
- Commencement: 15 May 1987 (sections 7–8); 15 July 1987 (rest of act); (Note: Section 8(2)–(3).)
Other legislation
Amended by	Violent Crime Reduction Act 2006; Custodial Sentences and Weapons (Scotland) Act 2007; Criminal Justice and Licensing (Scotland) Act 2010; Licensing (Amendment) (EU Exit) (Scotland) Regulations 2019
Relates to	Northern Ireland Act 1974]

Status: Amended

Text of statute as originally enacted

Revised text of statute as amended

Text of the Crossbows Act 1987 as in force today (including any amendments) within the United Kingdom, from legislation.gov.uk.

The Crossbows Act 1987 (c. 32) is an act of the Parliament of the United Kingdom, which is still in force. The act, as amended, controls the possession of crossbows by people under the age of eighteen throughout the whole of the United Kingdom. It gained royal assent on 15 May 1987, and came into force two months later.

While the act covers Great Britain, similar legislation - Crossbows (Northern Ireland) Order 1988 - covers Northern Ireland.

== Provisions of the act ==
The act prohibited individuals under the age of 18 to own or buy a crossbow and prohibited individuals under the age of 21 to shoot one without the supervision of someone older. The act also prohibits owners lending a crossbow to anyone else and prohibits shooting a crossbow in a private space or a public space, unless permission is obtained.

Section 1 of the act made it an offence to knowingly sell or hire a crossbow (or part of a crossbow) to a person under the age of seventeen; section 2 created the converse offence of buying or hiring a crossbow whilst underage.

Section 3 made it an offence for someone under the age of seventeen to possess a functioning crossbow, or of sufficient parts to make a functioning crossbow, unless under the supervision of an adult. Section 4 gave a police constable the power to search someone or their vehicle, if they suspected an offence was being committed under section 3; to detain someone for the purpose of this search; and to confiscate any crossbow or part of a crossbow which was found.

A person guilty of an offence under section 1 was liable for up to six months imprisonment or a fine up to level five on the standard scale; a person guilty of an offence under sections 2 or 3 was liable for a fine of up to level three on the standard scale. On conviction, the court could order any crossbow or components involved to be forfeited or destroyed.

The act explicitly does not apply to crossbows with a draw weight of less than 1.4 kilograms-force (3.1 lbf; 14 N).

== Amendments ==
Section 44 of the Violent Crime Reduction Act 2006 amended the act, raising the minimum age for possession from seventeen to eighteen; in Scotland, the same change was implemented by Section 62 of the Custodial Sentences and Weapons (Scotland) Act 2007.
