= Civilian enforcement officer =

Employee or authorised officer of His Majesty's Courts & Tribunals Service

Civilian enforcement officers (CEOs) are either employees or authorised officers of His Majesty's Courts & Tribunals Service and are responsible for enforcing magistrates' court orders. They can seize and sell goods to recover money owed under a fine and community penalty notice. They also execute, in England and Wales, warrants of arrest, committal, detention and distraint (also called distress). Members of approved enforcement agencies have the same powers as civilian enforcement officers, but are employed by private companies. Both are referred to as 'authorised officers' in law.

== Civilian enforcement officers ==
"Civilian enforcement officer", in relation to a warrant, means a person who:

- is employed by an authority of a prescribed class which performs functions in relation to any area specified in the warrant; and
- is authorised in the prescribed manner to execute warrants.

== Approved enforcement agencies ==
The Lord Chancellor may approve persons or bodies for the purpose of executing warrants pursuant to section 125B of the Magistrates' Courts Act 1980. The Lord Chancellor must maintain a register containing the names of all persons and bodies approved by them and must make such arrangements as they consider appropriate for making the register available for inspection. A decision by the Lord Chancellor to revoke the approval of a person or body does not have effect to revoke the approval until the Lord Chancellor has informed the person or body of the decision.

Current approved agencies, which are included on the list, are as follows:

- Compliant Data-Led Engagements & Resolutions (CDER) Group for Primary Services in HMCTS Regions - London, South East and the Midlands and Secondary Services in North East, North West, South West and Wales
- Marston Holdings for Primary Services in HMCTS Regions - North East, North West and the South West and Secondary Services in London, South East and the Midlands
- Excel Civil Enforcement Limited for Primary Services in HMCTS Region - Wales (until 31 March 2021)
- Swift Credit Services Limited for Secondary Services in HMCTS Region - Wales (until 31 March 2021)

== Powers ==
The powers of 'authorised officers' derive from the Magistrates' Courts Act. Authorised officers are:

- civilian enforcement officers
- individuals who are approved enforcement agencies
- directors of companies which are approved enforcement agencies
- partners in a partnership which is an approved enforcement agency, and
- employees of an approved enforcement agency who are authorised in writing by the agency to execute warrants.

The powers of authorised officers extend to all of England and Wales.

They may execute any warrant of arrest, commitment, detention or distress issued by a justice of the peace:

- under any provision specified for the purposes of this subsection by an order made by the Lord Chancellor and the Secretary of State, acting jointly; or
- for the enforcement of a court order of any description so specified.

The power to make orders above shall be exercisable by statutory instrument which shall be subject to annulment in pursuance of a resolution of either House of Parliament.

Where a warrant has been executed by a civilian enforcement officer, a written statement indicating:

- the name of the officer;
- the authority by which they are employed; and
- that they are authorised in the prescribed manner to execute warrants,

shall, on the demand of the person arrested, committed or detained or against whom distress is levied, be shown to them as soon as practicable.

Where a warrant has been executed by an authorised officer who is not a civilian enforcement officer, a written statement indicating:

- the name of the person by whom the warrant was executed;
- if they are a director of, or partner in, an approved enforcement agency, the fact that they are a director of, or partner in, that agency;
- if they are an employee of an approved enforcement agency, the fact that they are an employee authorised in writing by that agency to execute warrants; and
- the fact that their name, (or if a director of or partner in an approved enforcement agency, that of the agency indicated) is contained in the register maintained by the Lord Chancellor,

shall, on the demand of the person arrested, committed or detained or against whom distress is levied, be shown to them as soon as practicable.

=== Entry to execute a warrant of arrest, commitment or detention ===
An authorised officer may enter and search any premises for the purpose of executing a warrant of arrest, commitment or detention issued in proceedings for or in connection with any criminal offence.

The power may be exercised only to the extent that it is reasonably required for that purpose; and only if the officer has reasonable grounds for believing that the person whom he is seeking is on the premises. In relation to premises consisting of two or more separate dwellings, the power is limited to entering and searching any parts of the premises which the occupiers of any dwelling comprised in the premises use in common with the occupiers of any other such dwelling; and any such dwelling in which the officer has reasonable grounds for believing that the person whom he is seeking may be.

=== Entry to levy distress ===
An authorised officer may enter and search any premises for the purpose of executing a warrant of distress issued under section 76 of the Magistrates' Courts Act for default in paying a sum adjudged to be paid by a conviction. The power may be exercised only to the extent that it is reasonably required for that purpose.

=== Searching arrested persons ===
This applies where a person is arrested in pursuance of a warrant of arrest, commitment or detention issued in proceedings for or in connection with any criminal offence. An authorised officer may search the arrested person, if they have reasonable grounds for believing that the arrested person may present a danger to themself or others. An authorised officer may also search the arrested person for anything which they might use to assist them to escape from lawful custody, but only if the officer has reasonable grounds for believing that the arrested person may have concealed on them anything of a kind mentioned in that sub-paragraph; and only to the extent that it is reasonably required for the purpose of discovering any such thing.

The powers conferred by this paragraph to search a person are not to be read as authorising the officer to require a person to remove any of his clothing in public other than an outer coat, a jacket or gloves; but they do authorise the search of a person’s mouth.

An officer searching a person may seize and retain anything they find, if the officer has reasonable grounds for believing that the person searched might use it to cause physical injury to themself or to any other person, or the person might use it to assist them to escape from lawful custody.

An authorised officer may use reasonable force, if necessary, in the exercise of their powers of arrest, entry and search.

== See also ==
- Bailiff
