= List of support for High Speed 2 =

The planned high-speed railway in the UK known as High Speed 2 is supported by various groups and organisations.

== Organisations ==
Organisations that support the HS2 project include:

- The two major UK political parties: Labour (albeit with some criticism of the proposed route) and the Liberal Democrats. In Labour's 2019 manifesto, the party said it would extend the dedicated high-speed track to Scotland.
- The Green Party changed its stance from opposition to support in September 2024.
- Greengauge 21, a not-for-profit research company which focuses on investigating high-speed rail technology,
- The Campaign for HSR, a campaign group led by Professor David Begg which aims to canvas support from businesses across the UK to promote the case for proposed high-speed rail. The campaign currently has support from over 400 UK businesses.
- HSR:UK, a group of city councils: Birmingham, Bristol, Cardiff, Edinburgh, Glasgow, Leeds, Liverpool, Manchester, Newcastle, Nottingham, and Sheffield.
- Go-HS2, a group comprising Centro, Birmingham City Council, Birmingham Chamber of Commerce, Birmingham Airport and the NEC Group. The objective of the group is to promote the benefits that its members believe HS2 will bring to Birmingham and the West Midlands.
- The Passenger Transport Executives Group (PTEG), which represents six Passenger Transport Executives.
- The Scottish Government, which is generally supportive of the HS2 project and has been engaged in discussions with the UK Government about the development of a Scottish high-speed railway connecting to London and continental Europe, with the aim of reducing journey times to London from Scotland to under 3 hours.
- The North East Chamber of Commerce and the Greater Manchester Chamber of Commerce. Support has been confirmed by local authorities in the North of England such as Manchester and Leeds City Councils
- Hammersmith and Fulham Council, which reaffirmed its support for the project in January 2012. The council's cabinet member for strategy was reported as saying "HS2 is the fastest way to deliver much-needed new homes, jobs and opportunities in one of London's poorest areas."
- 20MM (Twenty Miles More). A campaign group based in Liverpool with the aim to extend HS2 track an extra 20 miles (30 km) into the city to give a full high-speed rail service into the city centre and free existing classic lines for freight for the expanded Port of Liverpool.
- The Commons Transport Committee, which in November 2011 reported that the scheme had "a good case" and offered "a new era of inter-urban travel in Britain." However, it also said there should be a firm commitment made now to extend the line to Manchester and Leeds and that other investment in rail should not suffer, and noted a poor level of public debate which had failed to address the facts and had resorted to name-calling and accusations of nimbyism.
- The High Speed Rail Industry Leaders (HSRIL) released a report in 2019 arguing that HS2 is necessary if the UK is to meet carbon emissions targets.
- Network Rail
- Greens for HS2, a campaign group created by members of the Green Party of England and Wales to challenge the party's position on HS2.
- Railfuture

== Politicians ==
=== Conservative politicians ===
- Alec Shelbrooke, Conservative MP for Elmet and Rothwell
- Andrew Mitchell, Conservative MP for Sutton Coldfield
- Andrew Percy, Conservative MP for Brigg and Goole
- Andy Street, Mayor of the West Midlands
- Craig Whittaker, Conservative MP for Calder Valley
- Darren Henry, Conservative MP for Broxtowe
- David Mundell, Conservative MP for Dumfriesshire, Clydesdale and Tweeddale
- Jason McCartney, Conservative MP for Colne Valley
- Jonathan Gullis, Conservative MP for Stoke-on-Trent North
- Kieran Mullan, Conservative MP for Crewe and Nantwich
- Mark Eastwood, Conservative MP for Dewsbury
- Nick Fletcher, Conservative MP for Don Valley
- Robert Goodwill, Conservative MP for Scarborough and Whitby
- Robert Largan, Conservative MP for High Peak
- Stuart Andrew, Conservative MP for Pudsey
- Theresa May, Conservative MP for Maidenhead
- Victoria Prentis, Conservative MP for Banbury and Minister for Agriculture and Food
- Julian Knight, Conservative MP for Solihull

=== Labour politicians ===
- Andy Burnham, Mayor of Greater Manchester
- Dan Jarvis, Labour MP for Barnsley Central
- Gill Furniss, Labour MP for Sheffield Brightside and Hillsborough
- Holly Lynch, Labour MP for Halifax
- Lilian Greenwood, Labour MP for Nottingham South
- Mike Kane, Labour MP for Wythenshawe and Sale East
- Paul Blomfield, Labour MP for Sheffield Central
- Rebecca Long-Bailey, Labour MP for Salford and Eccles
- Rosie Winterton, Labour MP for Doncaster Central
- Toby Perkins, Labour MP for Chesterfield

=== Green politicians ===
- Rosi Sexton, Solihull councillor

=== Independent politicians ===
- Jeremy Corbyn, MP for Islington North

== Individuals ==
- Pete Waterman
- Nigel Harris, editor of Rail

== See also ==
- List of opposition to High Speed 2
- History of High Speed 2
- Turin–Lyon high-speed railway
