= List of opposition to High Speed 2 =

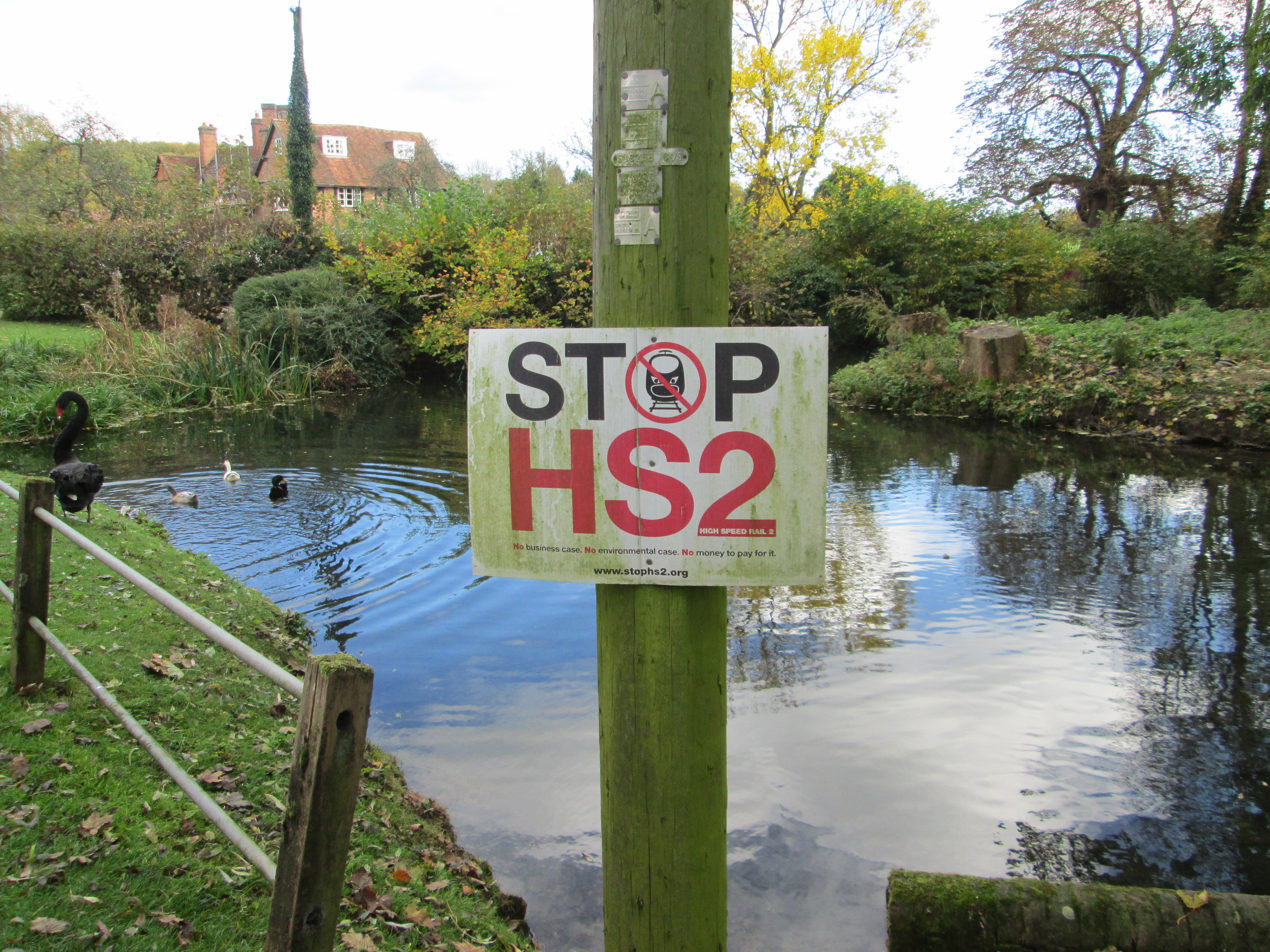
"Stop HS2" signs are frequently erected by opposition groups in areas close to the planned HS2 route.

The planned high-speed railway in the UK known as High Speed 2 has encountered significant opposition from various organisations and individuals.

== Political parties ==
- The Green Party had previously voted to oppose the HS2 plans at its Spring 2011 conference on environmental and economic grounds. Alan Francis, the party transport spokesperson, had previously outlined its support for high-speed rail in principle in terms of benefits to capacity, reduced journey times and reduced carbon emissions, but recommended a line restricted to 300 to 320 kilometres per hour (190 to 200 mph) which would enable it to use existing transport corridors to a greater extent and increase efficiency. However, in September 2024 the party reversed its stance and now supports the line.
- The UK Independence Party (UKIP) is opposed nationally and locally to the proposed HS2 plans. UKIP has been campaigning against HS2 as it is also part of the EU's Trans-European Transport Network (TEN-T) Policy. It had previously proposed a much larger and more expensive three-line high-speed network running from London to Newcastle (and on to Scotland), London to Bristol (and on to Wales) and London to Birmingham along with upgrading several other sections of the WCML and Scottish rail to high speed in its 2010 manifesto.
- Reform UK, then known as the Brexit Party, said in 2019 it would save £200 billion by shelving the HS2 project.

== Campaign groups ==
- Stop HS2 organises nationally and represents local action groups along the route, under the slogan "No business case. No environmental case. No money to pay for it.".
- Penny Gaines commented in 2020 that "The case for HS2 has always been poor, and is simply getting worse".
- Extinction Rebellion, a global protest movement. Alongside Stop HS2, Extinction Rebellion organised a walk of 125 miles along the proposed railway line in June 2020.
- The HS2 Action Alliance was an umbrella group for opposition groups. These included ad hoc entities, residents' associations, and parish councils. The Alliance's primary aim was to prevent HS2 from happening; secondary aims included evaluating and minimising the impacts of HS2 on individuals, communities and the environment, and communication of facts about HS2, and its compensation scheme. The HS2 Action Alliance criticised the Department of Transport's demand forecasts as being too high, as well as having other shortcomings in the assessment methodology.
- Action Groups Against High Speed Two (AGHAST) claimed in 2011 that the project was not viable economically.
- The Right Lines Charter, an umbrella group established in 2011 for several environmental and other organisations that support the principle of a high-speed rail network but believe that the current HS2 scheme is unsound. Members include the Campaign for Better Transport, the Campaign to Protect Rural England, Friends of the Earth, Greenpeace, and Railfuture.

== Environmental groups ==
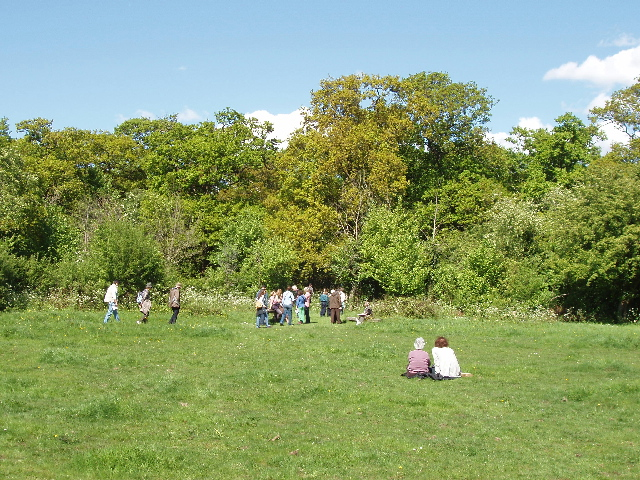
Perivale Wood in Ealing

- The Woodland Trust opposes the current route of the proposed High Speed 2 rail link because of its impact on ancient woodland. It reports that 108 ancient woods are threatened with loss or damage from the project.
- The Wildlife Trusts, which have criticised the proposals, stating that the former Government's policy on High Speed Rail (March 2010) underestimated the effect on wildlife habitats (with 4 SSSIs and over 50 of other types of nature site affected), as well as noting that the proposals had not comprehensively shown any significant effect on transport carbon emissions and questioning the economic benefits of a line. The trusts called for additional research to be done on the effects of a high-speed line.
- The Selborne Society voiced its concern about the proximity of HS2 to Perivale Wood, a Local Nature Reserve in Ealing.
- The Campaign to Protect Rural England believes that lower speeds would increase journey times only slightly, while allowing the line to run along existing motorway and railway corridors, reducing intrusion.

== Other groups ==
- The National Trust. Fiona Reynolds, at the time Director-General, stated in 2010: "there are lots of questions about the economics and above all the impact".
- The New Economics Foundation, a think-tank promoting environmentalism, localism and anti-capitalism. It published a formal response to the public consultation in August 2011 which concluded that the case for a high-speed rail link was incomplete and that the benefits of the scheme had been "over-emphasised" by its promoters.
- The Taxpayers Alliance, an anti-tax pressure group, describes the project as a white elephant.
- The Independent newspaper considers the costs excessive and the benefits uncertain. An investigation published in February 2013 claimed that 350 wildlife sites would be destroyed by the new HS2 line and an accompanying editorial argued that environmentalists should oppose the project. A separate investigation published in March 2013 suggested that the project was unlikely to keep within its £33 billion budget.
- The Federation of Small Businesses, which has expressed scepticism over the need for high-speed rail, stating that roads expenditure was more useful for its members.
- High Speed UK "is an alternative high speed rail network developed by professional railway engineers to address the shortcomings of HS2."

== Individuals and politicians ==
=== Notable individuals ===
- Chris Packham, naturalist
- Noddy Holder, musician

=== Conservative politicians ===
- Steve Baker, Conservative MP for Wycombe 2010–24 and Chair, European Research Group
- Shaun Bailey, Conservative Candidate for London Mayoral election 2021
- Bob Blackman, Conservative MP for Harrow East since 2010
- Sir Graham Brady, Conservative MP for Altrincham and Sale West from 1997 to 2024
- Andrew Bridgen, Conservative MP (2010–23) & Independent MP (2023–24) for North West Leicestershire from 2010
- Rob Butler, Conservative MP for Aylesbury 2019–24
- Theodora Clarke, Conservative MP for Stafford 2019–24
- Phillip Davies, Conservative MP for Shipley 2005–24
- Liam Fox, Conservative MP for North Somerset 1992–2024
- Dame Cheryl Gillan, Conservative MP for Amersham and Chesham from 1992 to 2021
- James Grundy, Conservative MP for Leigh 2019–24
- Adam Holloway, Conservative MP for Gravesham 2005–24
- Chris Loder, Conservative MP for West Dorset 2019–24
- Joy Morrissey, Conservative MP for Beaconsfield since 2019
- Laurence Robertson, Conservative MP for Tewkesbury 1997–2024
- David Simmonds, Conservative MP for Ruislip, Northwood & Pinner 2019–24
- Greg Smith, Conservative MP for Buckingham 2019–24 & Mid Buckinghamshire since 2024
- Alexander Stafford, Conservative MP for Rother Valley 2019–24
- William Wragg, Conservative MP for Hazel Grove 2015–24

=== Labour politicians ===
- Tony Berkeley, Labour Member of the House of Lords
- Peter Mandelson, Former Labour MP and House of Lords member since 2008
- Barry Sheerman, Labour MP for Huddersfield 1979-24
- Tulip Siddiq, Labour MP for Hampstead and Kilburn 2015–24 & Hampstead and Highgate 2024–
- Christian Wolmar, Former London Labour Mayoral candidate

=== Green Party politicians ===
- Jonathan Bartley, Co-Leader of the Green Party and Leader of the Opposition on Lambeth London Borough Council since 2018
- Siân Berry, Co-Leader of the Green Party and Green member of the London Assembly 2016–24 and MP for Brighton, Pavilion 2024–
- Caroline Lucas, Green MP for Brighton, Pavilion 2010–24
- Caroline Russell, Leader of the Green Party on the London Assembly since 2016
- Natalie Bennet, Leader of the Green Party 2012-16 and Member of the House of Lords 2019-

=== Reform UK politicians ===
- Nigel Farage, past leader of UKIP and later the Reform UK, MEP 1999–2019, current leader of Reform UK since 2024 and MP for Clacton since 2024

== Local government ==
- The 51m group consists of 19 local authorities along or adjacent to the Phase One route. It suggests the project will cost each Parliamentary Constituency £51 million. Constituent members of 51m include:
  - Buckinghamshire County Council
  - London Borough of Hillingdon
  - Warwickshire County Council
  - Leicestershire County Council
  - Northamptonshire County Council
  - Oxfordshire County Council
  - Coventry City Council
  - Camden Borough Council
  - Staffordshire County Council
- Derby City Council was disappointed at the chosen location for the East Midlands Hub station in Toton, preferring a route that would make use of the existing Derby railway station. These plans are opposed by Derbyshire County Council, Nottingham City Council, and Rushcliffe Borough Council.
- The Coventry and Warwickshire Chamber of Commerce opined that HS2 offered no benefit to its area.
- Wakefield Council opposes HS2, preferring instead "to upgrade rail connections between the cities and towns in the North's east and west and to make the national highway fit for purpose".

== See also ==
- List of support for High Speed 2
- Rail transport in Great Britain
- Turin–Lyon high-speed railway
