= Chiltern Tunnel =

Tunnel under construction in England

- Interactive map of Chiltern Tunnel

Overview
- Line: High Speed 2
- Location: United Kingdom (Buckinghamshire, Hertfordshire)
- Coordinates: 51.7095°N 0.6931°W (north portal): 51.6116°N 0.5241°W (south portal)
- OS grid reference: TQ022913
- Status: Construction complete, fitting out
- Crosses: Chiltern Hills
- Start: West Hyde, Hertfordshire
- End: South Heath, Buckinghamshire

Operation
- Work began: 13 May 2021 (boring)
- Constructed: 2020–2026
- Traffic: High-speed passenger trains

Technical
- Length: 16.04 km (9.97 miles)
- No. of tracks: 2 single-track tunnels
- Track gauge: 1,435 mm (4 ft 8 1/2 in) standard gauge
- Electrified: 25 kV 50 Hz AC
- Operating speed: 320 km/h (200 mph)
- Width: 9.1 metres (30 ft)
- Grade: −0.835% to +2.500%
- Cross passages: 38

The Chiltern Tunnel is a high-speed railway tunnel in Buckinghamshire and Hertfordshire, England, which will carry the High Speed 2 (HS2) railway line under the Chiltern Hills. The twin-bore tunnels, which are 16.04 km (9.97 miles) long, are the longest on the HS2 line. Each tunnel also has additional 220 m (720 ft) entry and 135 m (443 ft) exit perforated concrete portals to reduce sudden changes in air pressure and subsequent noise.

A contract for the tunnel's construction was awarded in 2017; preparatory work commenced during the following year. In May 2021, it was announced that excavation had commenced. The boring process, which was largely performed by a pair of tunnel boring machines (TBMs), advanced at an average speed of 15 m (49 ft) per day; both TBMs completed their drives by March 2024. Civil engineering work on the tunnel was completed by January 2026.

== History ==
The construction of the High Speed 2 (HS2) railway involves numerous major civil engineering works along its intended route, with construction periodical New Civil Engineer describing the Chiltern Hills as "HS2’s biggest and potentially most challenging site". Of the 102 km (63 miles) of tunnels that are to be bored to accommodate the line, around 16 km (9.9 miles) were bored for the Chiltern Tunnel alone.

The design of the tunnel has been subject to changes during the planning stages of the project. During August 2015, it was announced that the tunnels would be extended 2.6 km (1.6 miles) north; this revision has allowed for the replacement of a separate planned cut-and-cover tunnel, as well as avoiding the destruction of around 12 hectares (30 acres) of woodland such as Farthings Wood. During 2017, Contract C1 (Central 1), which covers the 21.6km section of the line that the Chiltern Tunnel comes within, was awarded to the Align JV joint venture, comprising Bouygues Travaux Publics, Sir Robert McAlpine and VolkerFitzpatrick. The two tunnel boring machines were supplied by Herrenknecht and were delivered to the site in December 2020.

== Design ==
The basic configuration of the tunnel consists of a pair of parallel bores, which are to be excavated by a pair of tunnel boring machines (TBMs). Each TBM weighs around 2,000 tonnes, has a length of 170 m (560 ft), and has been specially customised to suit the local geology, which primarily consists of chalk and flint. Staff are conveyed between the surface and the TBM using people carriers, which had up to a one-hour transit time towards the later years of the boring. While both TBMs are intended to be operational simultaneously throughout the majority of the work, due to sensitivities surrounding the M25 motorway, only one TBM was active at a time while near to this key trunk route.

The southern entrance to the tunnels is aligned with the nearby Colne Valley Viaduct and is near the M25. The pair of tunnels are 16.04 km (9.97 miles) long, with the northern portal near South Heath. At their deepest point, they are 90 m (300 ft) below ground level; the internal diameter of each bore is 9.1 m (30 ft).

The tunnel has a total of 38 cross passages, between 15 m (49 ft) and 20 m (66 ft) long, spaced 500 m (1,600 ft) apart, and 5 adits linking the two separate bores. The tunnel has five 18 m (59 ft) diameter shafts used for both ventilation and emergency access purposes between 35 m (115 ft) and 65 m (213 ft) deep. These are located at Chalfont St Peter, Chalfont St Giles, Amersham, Little Missenden and Chesham Road - the latter of which is an intervention shaft for emergencies. These vents are all to be fitted with headhouses, produced through engagement with both the Chilterns AONB Review Group and Buckinghamshire Council. The surface elements of the St Giles shaft have been intentionally disguised as agricultural buildings. The initial design of the Amersham vent shaft headhouse was modified after being criticised due to its design being reportedly out of keeping with the location. Each tunnel has an emergency walkway that would allow passengers to evacuate and then cross into the other tunnel to be rescued on a passenger train.

The tunnel has porous portals (a form of tunnel entrance hood) that extend for up to 220 metres (720 ft) beyond the end of the bored section in the hillside - this is to dissipate the pressure wave built up by trains at line speed, thus reducing the adverse effects of audible "sonic boom" in line with environmental commitments.

== Construction ==
In July 2020, work was completed on a 17 m (56 ft) high headwall at the southern end, at 51.6117°N 0.5242°W, close to the M25 motorway. To accommodate workers during the construction phase, a temporary facility containing accommodation and various amenities was constructed on site; this site was also used to support the construction of the nearby Colne Valley Viaduct as well.

During September 2020, final preparations for the arrival of the first of the two TBMs were made and both arrived on site in December that year. Names for the two machines were suggested by children from Meadow High School in Hillingdon and Chalfonts Community College, and Cecilia and Florence were chosen by a public vote. The names commemorate Buckinghamshire-born astronomer Cecilia Payne-Gaposchkin and Florence Nightingale. During March 2021, the first section of fibre-reinforced concrete tunnel lining was cast; this was produced onsite at the Align JV's purpose-built facility near the southern portal, which was capable of manufacturing up to 49 segments at a time.

Excavation commenced on 13 May 2021, with completion estimated around March 2024. Each TBM was operated by a crew of 17 working in 12-hour shifts, while surface logistics and support for the boring work was provided by over 100 people on the surface. During June 2021, the second TBM commenced boring. The first stage of the drive (from the south portal to the Chalfont St Peter ventilation shaft) was completed in March 2022, and the first of the cross passages between the main running tunnels were completed in August that year. The Chalfont St Giles ventilation shaft was reached in October 2022, Amersham in March 2023, Little Missenden in August, and Chesham Road in December of the same year.

The chalk excavated during the boring of the tunnels is to be used to create a nature reserve covering 127 hectares (310 acres) in the vicinity of the southern portals; for this purpose, measures for the temporary storage and treatment of up to 3,000,000 cubic metres (110,000,000 cubic feet) of chalk slurry were provisioned onsite prior to excavation commencing. Approval for this scheme was issued in May 2021.

One of the tunnel bores was temporarily evacuated in May 2022 following a fire on a personnel transportation vehicle. No personnel were injured and the tunnel itself was undamaged after the fire was brought under control.

Tunnelling work was unaffected by the formation of a sinkhole, estimated to be 5 m (16 ft) deep and 6 m (20 ft) wide, near Shardeloes Lake, Amersham in May 2023, although an investigation was launched by the Environment Agency into the causes of the ground collapse. The resulting inquiry found that the local water supply was not contaminated, and the sinkhole was filled with 165 cubic metres (5,800 cubic feet) of chalk in September 2023. Further work to ensure the hole is filled was completed in early 2024. Another sinkhole formed in November 2023 near Hedgemoor Wood, Hyde Heath, and two more followed in February 2024 adjacent to Frith Hill in South Heath, although tunnelling remained unaffected in both cases.

The cross-passages were excavated with a remote-controlled excavator and supported by a sprayed concrete lining, before a waterproof membrane and secondary concrete lining were applied.

Florence's progress was hampered significantly during the last few weeks of its drive by a geology change, as the final 140m to the north portal replaced the usual chalk with a more clay-like substance, causing several blockages in the slurry pipes. Despite these late challenges, overall the drive was reported to be smooth, with Align JV tunnelling lead Didier Jacques reporting that during 2023 the TBM team achieved an “incredible” average of 20m a day. The record progress for one day was 42m and the record for a week was 226m. In one calendar month of October 2023, 850m of progress was made.

TBM Florence broke through at the north portal in South Heath on 27 February 2024, with Cecilia following suit on 22 March. 112,350 concrete segments were used to line both tunnels, forming 16,050 rings.

On 19 January 2026, HS2 announced the completion of civil engineering works for the tunnel.
