= Colne Valley Viaduct =

HS2 Railway Bridge in Harefield

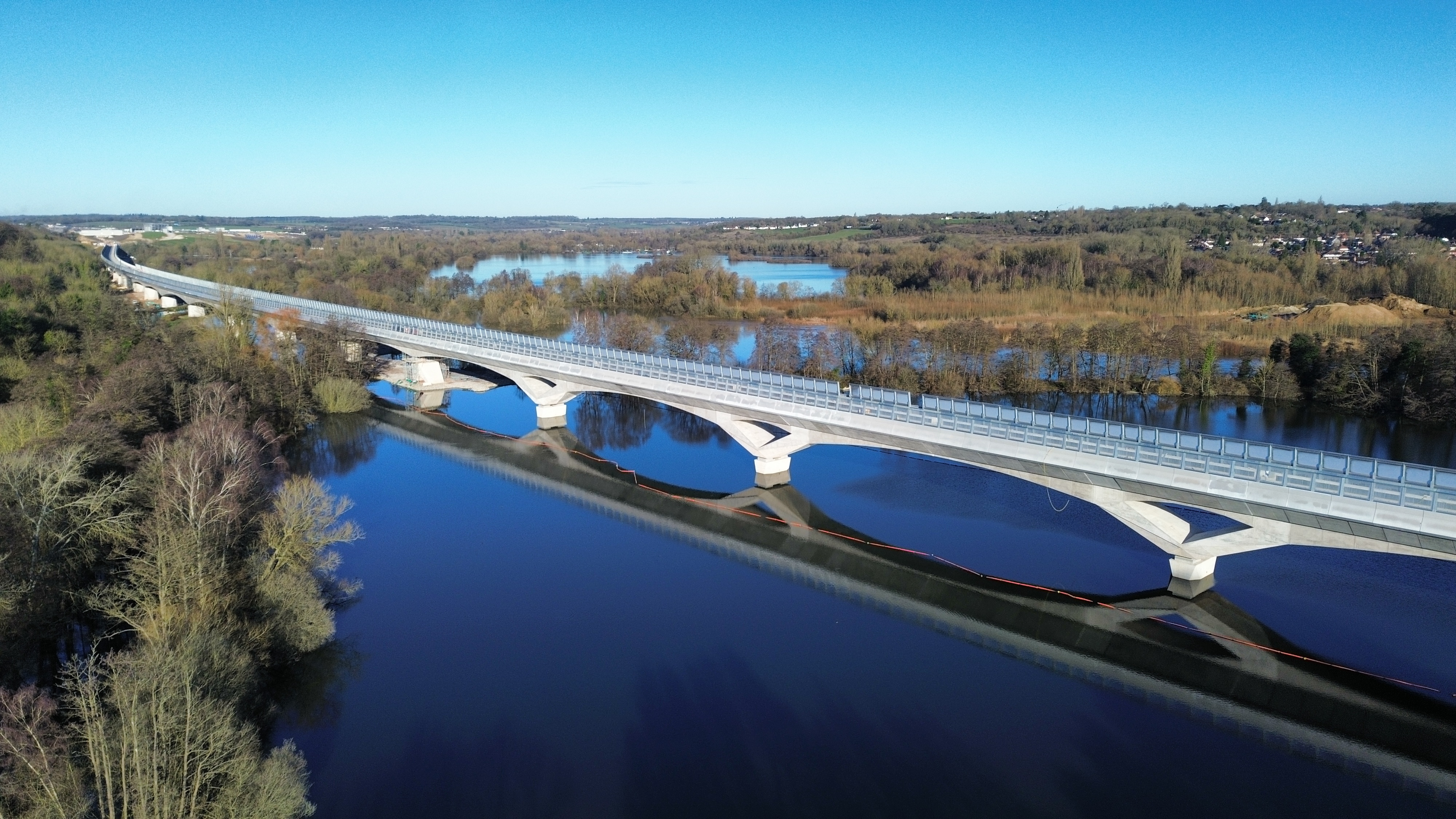
- Viaduct in January 2025 over Korda Lake
- Coordinates: 51.5859°N 0.4900°W
- Carries: High Speed 2
- Crosses: Colne Valley Regional Park
- Locale: Harefield; Denham

Characteristics
- Total length: 3.38 kilometres (2.10 mi)
- Width: 14.3 metres (47 ft)
- Height: c.10 metres (33 ft)
- Longest span: 80 metres (260 ft)
- No. of spans: 57
- Piers in water: 11

Rail characteristics
- No. of tracks: 2
- Track gauge: 1,435 mm (4 ft 8 1/2 in)
- Electrified: 25 kV 50 Hz AC

History
- Architect: Grimshaw; Knight Architects - concept; LDA Design - landscape
- Engineering design by: Rendel-Ingerop, Jacobs
- Constructed by: Align JV (Bouygues Travaux Publics, Sir Robert McAlpine and VolkerFitzpatrick)
- Construction start: March 2021
- Construction end: September 2024 (deck); September 2025 (structure)

Statistics
- Daily traffic: High speed passenger trains

Location
- Interactive map of Colne Valley Viaduct

The Colne Valley Viaduct is a railway bridge that will carry High Speed 2 over the Colne Valley Regional Park and the Grand Union Canal. It runs between Harefield in Hillingdon, Greater London and Denham in Buckinghamshire. At a length of 3.38 km (2.10 miles) and a weight of 116,000 tonnes, it is the longest railway bridge in the UK. It is one of the largest single civil engineering works of High Speed 2. Trains will travel at about 320 km/h (200 miles per hour) on the bridge.

A contract for the section of the railway pertaining to the viaduct was awarded during 2017 and the design concept was shown in January 2018. Preparatory work commenced shortly thereafter, including a compulsory land purchase and the establishment of temporary facilities, including a factory, onsite. Construction of the viaduct began in March 2021, with the main deck completed in September 2024 and full completion of the bridge in September 2025. Protestors occasionally occupied the site, and allegations over the viaduct's aesthetic and environmental impact upon the area have been made.

== Design ==
The Colne Valley Viaduct was intended to be a major civil engineering work of High Speed 2, being amongst the largest and perhaps the most prominent single feature to be constructed on the project. Its basic configuration is a gently-curved structure along a horizontal radius of 5,280 m (17,320 ft), supported by 57 spans, with 11 V-shaped piers in water, and weighing roughly 116,000 tonnes in total. The viaduct crosses over both the River Colne and the Grand Union Canal, at which points its spans are spaced at intervals of 80 m (260 ft); the majority of over-land spans cover shorter lengths of either 45 or 60 m (148 or 197 ft). Trains will travel at about 320 km/h (200 miles per hour) on the bridge.

Considerable attention has been directed to the viaduct's aesthetic design and to avoid unnecessarily impacting the surrounding landscape and local community. To reduce its impact upon wildlife and the general public alike, four-metre (13 ft) high transparent acoustic barriers were installed along the entire length of the viaduct; these will reduce noise emissions while only incurring a minimal impact upon the view of onboard passengers. The design of the overhead electrification equipment was also bespoke to reduce its visual impact. The exterior concrete surfaces are faceted to provide a more attractive visual and tactile design. However, the viaduct has been subject to criticism from Stop HS2 for allegedly ignoring the needs of local residents. Rail industry periodical Rail Engineer notes that the site of the viaduct features multiple factors of sensitivity, pertaining to both environmental and public interests, as well as access issues during the construction phase.

The main deck of the viaduct was manufactured at a nearby temporary factory, the assembly of which was commenced from the northern end. In total, 908 deck units and 92 pier head units were produced; weighing between 60 and 140 tonnes, each one unique to its intended place in the overall structure. Assembly used a match-casting technique with relatively tight tolerances, supported by an adjustable steel formwork and prefabricated steel reinforcement where relevant. While two deck units were to be typically cast each day, the more complex pier head units required three days to complete. To appropriately handle rail braking loads of up to 9,000 tonnes, a total of four shock absorber units were integrated into the deck structure of the viaduct. The structure also features four expansion joints. The foundations consist of driven piles upon which the faceted framework is installed; water-based piers are considerably more complex in shape and design.

In November 2024, the viaduct won the Royal Fine Art Commission Trust's annual Building Beauty award in the engineering category. The judges praised it as a “tour de force that despite its scale [...] treads lightly, skimming over the water”, noting especially its elegant expansion joints, varied concrete treatments and lightweight acoustic wings. The Times called the bridge "a two-mile-long masterpiece".

== History ==
=== Planning ===
Various means for High Speed 2 to traverse the valley of the River Colne were considered. One option which was studied as an alternative to using a viaduct was the extension of the nearby Northolt tunnel, which was also being built for the new line, however this option was dismissed in a report released in February 2015 due to the increased costs and construction time that would be involved. During 2017, Contract C1 (Central 1), which covers the 21.6 km section of the line that the viaduct falls within, was awarded to the Align JV joint venture, comprising Bouygues Travaux Publics, Sir Robert McAlpine and VolkerFitzpatrick. RC Works were carried out by Kilnbridge Construction Services.

On 19 January 2018, the design concept for the Colne Valley Viaduct, which was created by Knight Architects and Atkins, was unveiled by the British Government. This concept was produced in consultation with the Colne Valley Regional Park Panel. Additional work on the viaduct's design has also been undertaken by Grimshaw Architects.

In April 2019, Buckinghamshire County Council requested that the government pause all preparatory work until the Oakervee Review had been completed and disagreed with HS2 Limited over mitigation works. During March 2021, Hillingdon Council and HS2 Limited came to an agreement in which, in light of written assurances from the latter, the former shall not pursue a judicial review into the scheme. Shortly following this decision, full planning permission for the viaduct was secured.

=== Preparation works ===
As early as 2018, protestors had taken up positions in the Colne Valley to voice their objections to the project. In April 2019, 12 Extinction Rebellion protesters began treesitting in order to prevent trees being chopping down as part of preparatory works at Harvil Road, near to the proposed site of the viaduct. There had been a protest camp next to the road since October 2017, which HS2 began evicting in January 2020.

In order to clear the viaduct's intended path, a farmhouse was compulsorily purchased while a watersports centre was required to relocate. Both properties were demolished. Various preparatory works were also undertaken during the 2010s, including the diversion of water mains, the realignment of a 275 kV overhead power line, the reinforcement of a gas main, along with other measures. Towards the northern end of the viaduct, a temporary construction compound was assembled, which accommodates offices, plant, employee welfare facilities, and the pre-cast factories for the project. Sufficient space for the storage and treatment of up to 3,000,000 cubic metres (110,000,000 cubic feet) of chalk slurry was also been provisioned for the construction of the Chiltern tunnel to the north of the viaduct.

=== Construction ===
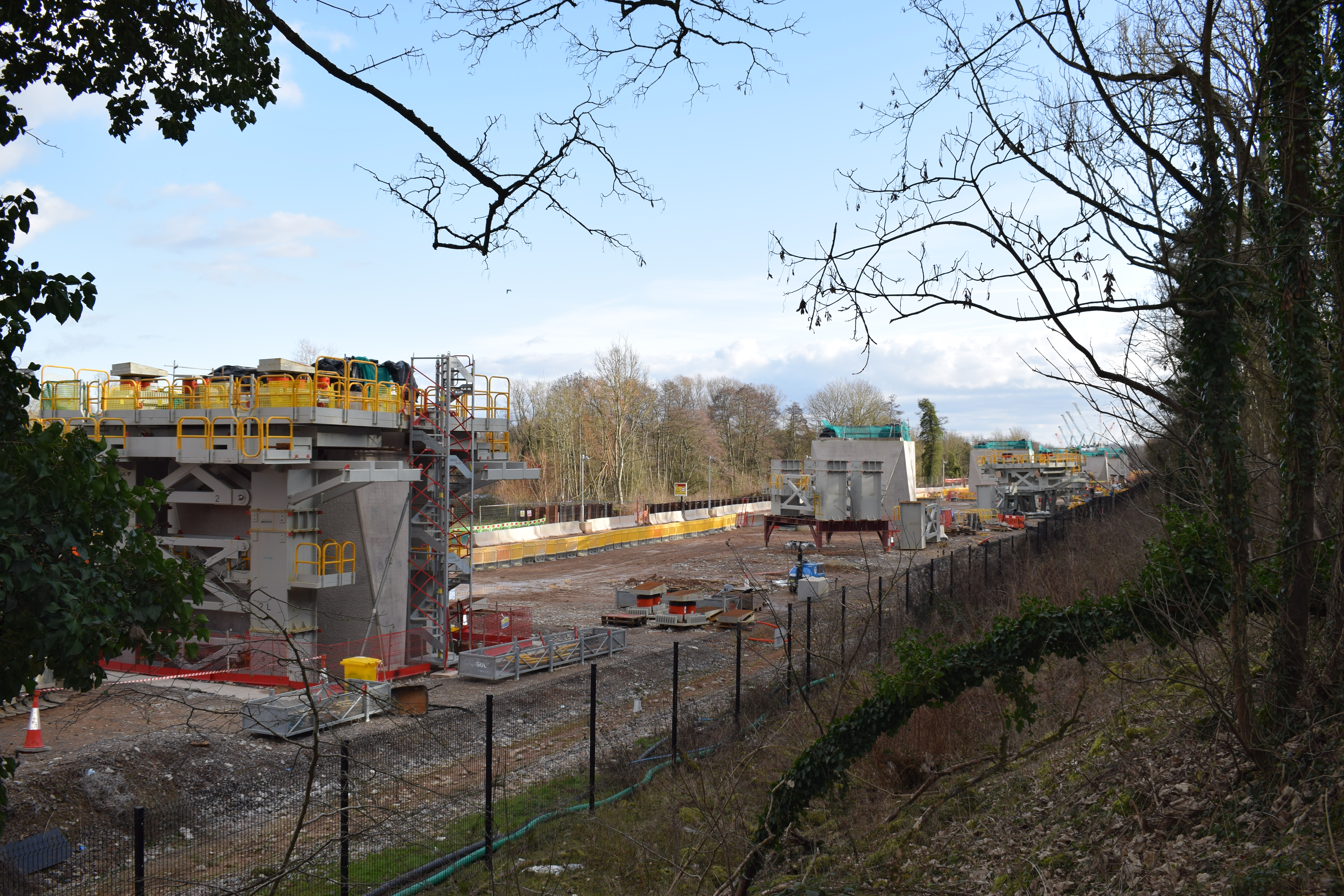
Colne Valley Viaduct bridge piers under construction in January 2023.

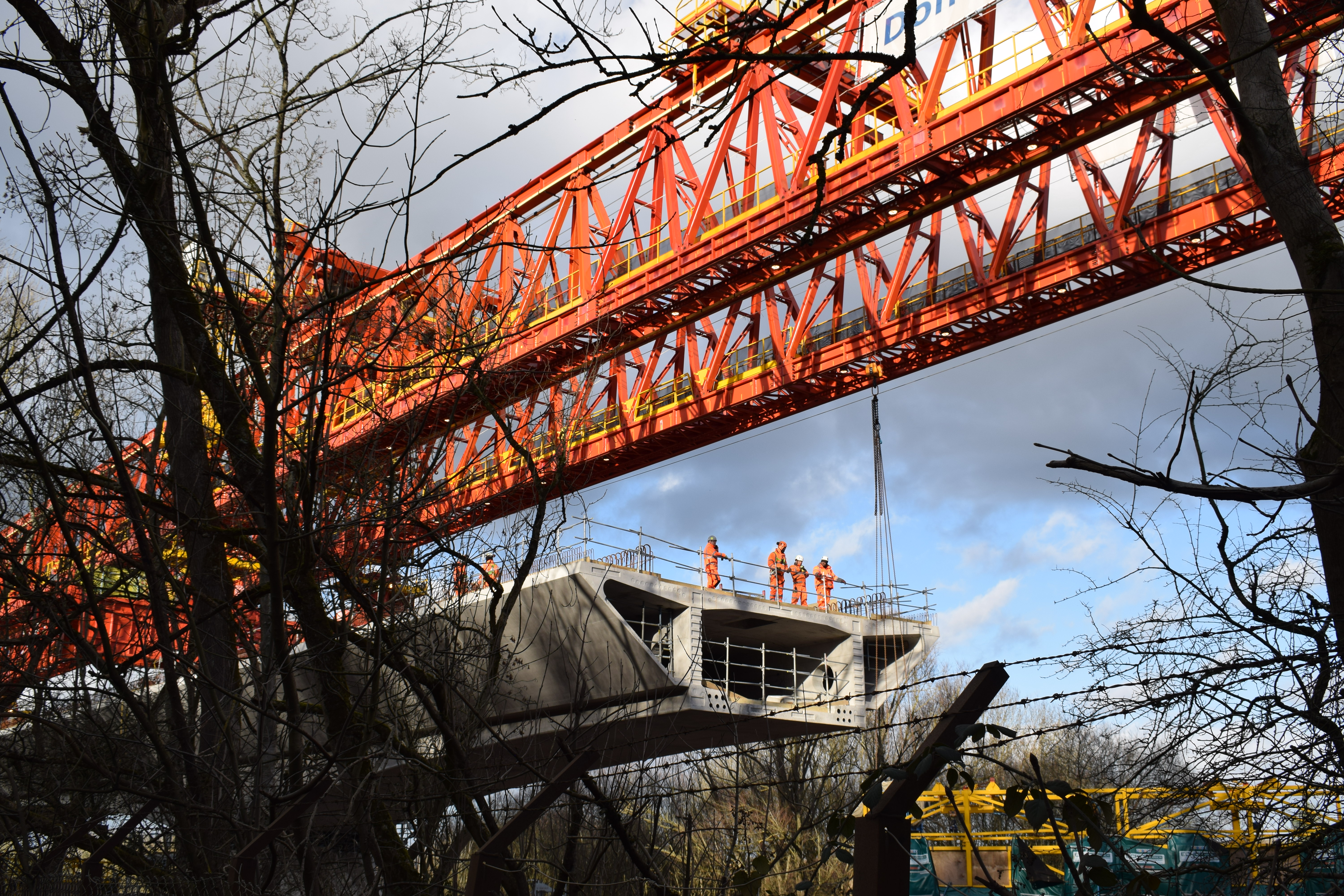
Construction in January 2023 showing the bridge deck cross section.

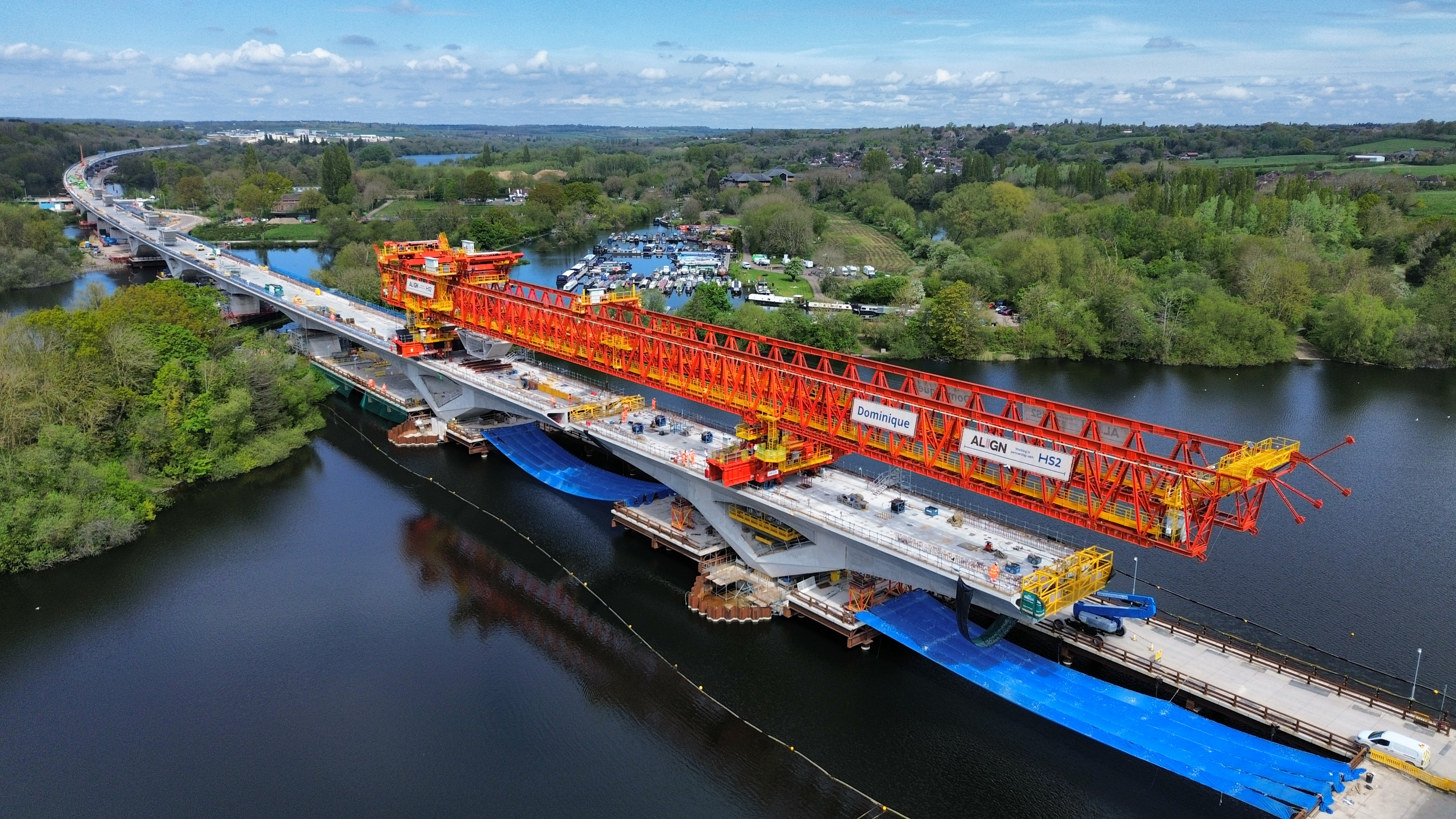
Construction gantry in April 2024

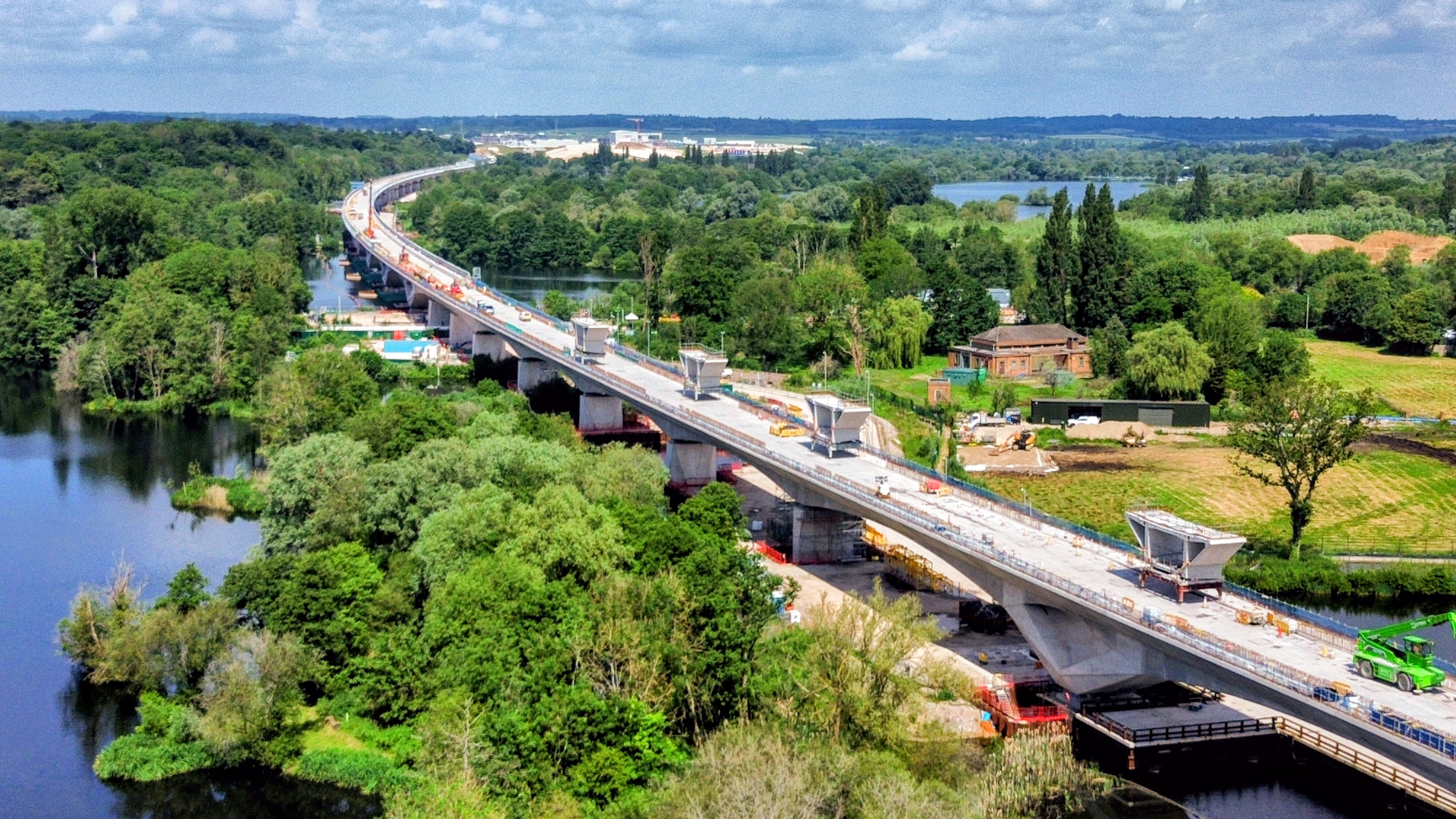
Viaduct under construction in June 2024

During March 2021, construction of the viaduct's foundations commenced, although test piling had occurred before this. Between spring and summer 2021, an internal access road was built, while the onsite factory building the viaduct segments were commissioned during the autumn. During May 2022, deck construction commenced from the northern embankment.

In December 2021, the first six-metre-tall (20 ft) pier for the viaduct was cast. Construction of four jetties across the lake was also completed to support work on the piers that will be built in the water. In June 2022, the launching girder named Dominique started construction. By December 2022, 125 of the 1,000 bridge segments had been placed in their final position.

Construction reached the half-way point (1.7 km) in November 2023. In February 2024, construction was halted for "urgent remedial works" in the week before the launching girder was due to begin crossing the Grand Union Canal. This involved repeating cable tensioning in the most recently completed span, which includes drilling out the concrete join. The final pre-cast deck segment, at Denham in Buckinghamshire, was installed on 5 September 2024. The viaduct was structurally complete by August 2025, with the installation of "parapets, noise barriers, robust kerbs, waterproofing, internal drainage and structural health monitoring systems". By September 2025, Align JV announced that bridge was fully complete. Track, power, signalling and other systems will subsequently be installed by various contractors to allow trains to operate.
