= Northolt Tunnel =

Twin-bore tunnel for HS2 railway

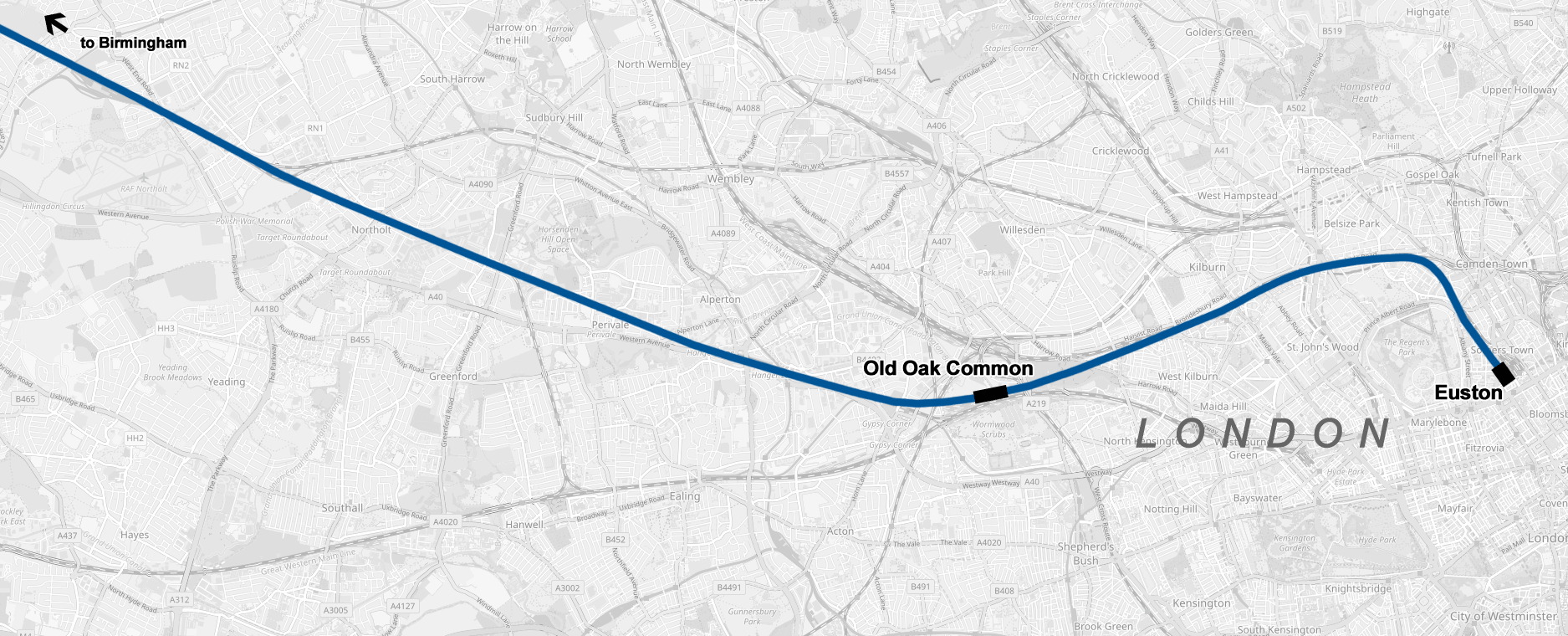
- HS2 route running west from London Euston, through Old Oak Common towards Ruislip
- Interactive map of Northolt Tunnel

Overview
- Coordinates: 51.536°N 0.319°W
- Status: Construction complete, fitting out
- System: High Speed 2
- Crosses: West London
- Start: Old Oak Common railway station
- End: Ruislip

Operation
- Constructed: 6 October 2022 - 26 June 2025
- Traffic: High-speed passenger trains

Technical
- Length: 8.4 miles (13.5 km)
- No. of tracks: 2 single-track tunnels
- Track gauge: 1,435 mm (4 ft 8 1/2 in)
- Electrified: 25 kV 50 Hz AC
- Operating speed: 320 km/h (200 mph)
- Width: West - 8.8 metres (29 ft); East - 8.1 metres (27 ft)
- Grade: −0.59% to +2.50%
- Cross passages: 34

Northolt Tunnel is a high-speed railway tunnel in Greater London, England, that will carry the High Speed 2 (HS2) railway line under the West London suburbs. The twin-bore tunnels were excavated from October 2022 until June 2025 and run for 8.4 miles (13.5 km) between Old Oak Common and Ruislip.

Plans for the construction of a tunnel were first unveiled in early 2013; it was hailed as being less disruptive and quicker to construct than a surface-based alignment. An option for the tunnel's extension along the Colne Valley to replace the proposed Colne Valley Viaduct was studied but rejected as unnecessarily costly during 2015. Extensive ground surveys along the intended route were conducted during the 2010s in advance of construction work. During April 2020, it was announced that a contract worth approximately £3.3 billion had been awarded to a joint venture company, Skanska Costain Strabag, for the tunnel's construction.

== History ==
The construction of the High Speed 2 (HS2) railway is to involve numerous major civil engineering works along its intended route; it has been anticipated that around 102 km (63 miles) of tunnels are to be bored along various parts of its route in order to accommodate it. During early 2013, it was confirmed that this section of HS2 would be constructed in a tunnel, rather than above ground. At the time, HS2 Ltd, the delivery company behind the line, stated that the use of a tunnel was the optimum solution, reducing the disruption caused by the railway's construction upon the local community while also accelerating the timetable for that portion of the route.

Prior to any construction activity commencing, numerous surveys and ground investigations were conducted along the intended route; the effort was described by Steve Reynolds, HS2’s ground investigation programme manager, as "the largest ground investigation programme that the UK has ever seen". During early 2018, a layer of black clay was discovered, which has been dubbed the "Ruislip Bed"; this material dates back 56 million years and was formed from densely wooded marshes at the coast of a sub-tropical sea.

During the early-to-mid 2010s, the possibility of extending the tunnel to traverse the Colne Valley, as an alternative to the proposed Colne Valley Viaduct, was examined in detail. However, this option was formally dismissed in a report released in February 2015, primarily due to the increased costs and construction time that such a change would predicted to involve.

During April 2020, it was announced that a contract had been awarded to a joint venture company, Skanska Costain Strabag, for the tunnel's construction. In October 2020, it was revealed that Herrenknecht would be supplying the two tunnel boring machines (TBMs) that would be used in the boring of the western section.

== Design ==
The tunnel has five shafts and associated headhouses at Victoria Road, Westgate, Green Park Way, Mandeville Road, and South Ruislip, providing ventilation and emergency access. The tunnel reaches a maximum depth of 35 metres (115 ft), while the distance between the two tunnel bores ranges from 6 metres (20 ft) to 20 metres (66 ft).

The tunnel bores are connected by 34 cross-passages.

== Construction ==
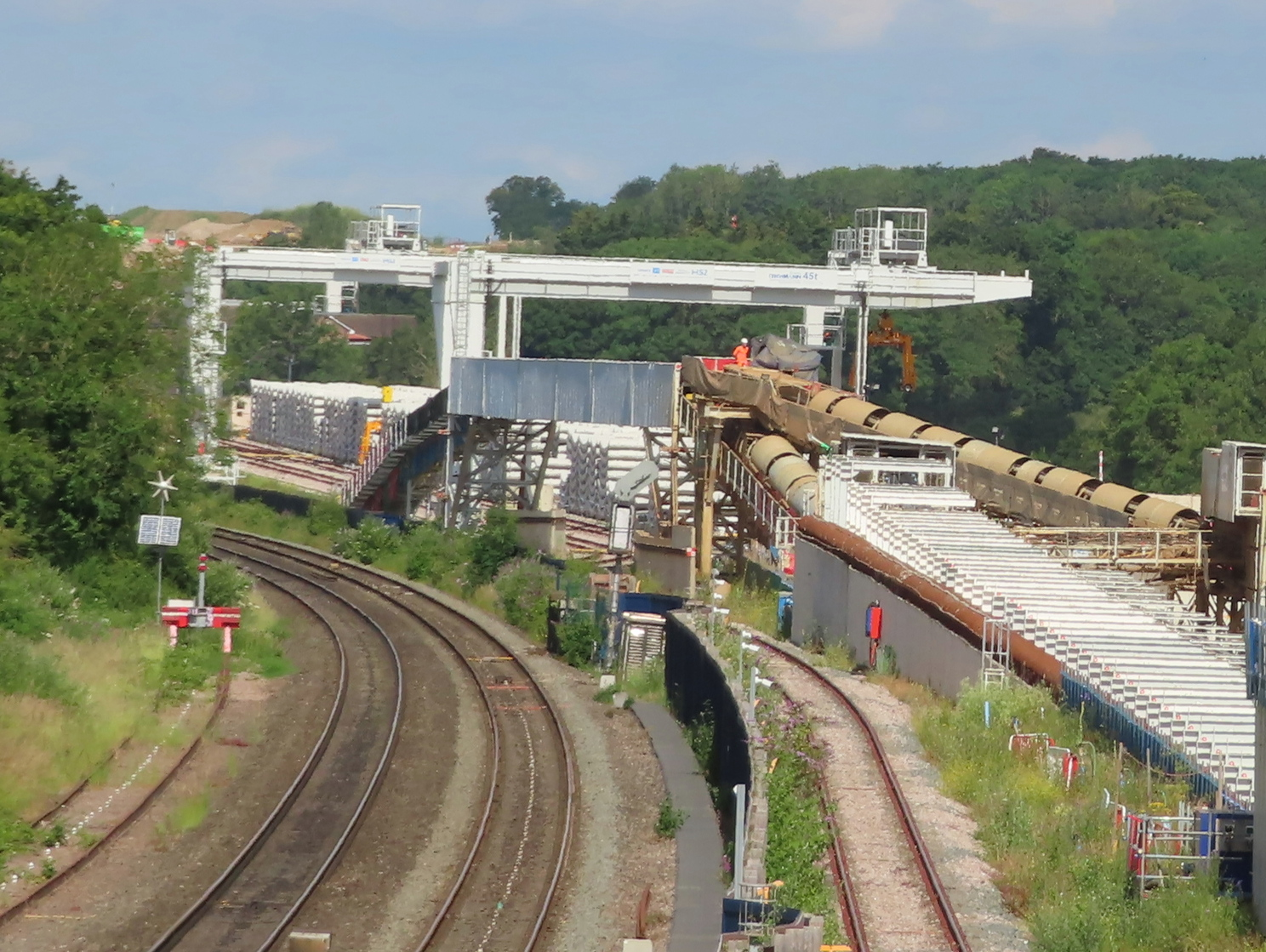
Tunnel portal, West Ruislip

The tunnel was bored in two sections; the western section is 5 miles (8.0 km) long and the eastern section is 3.4 miles (5.5 km) Of these, 13.7 km (8.5 miles) was designed as a twin bored tunnel, which was excavated using a total of four earth pressure balance TBMs. Following the completion of boring, all four TBMs were retrieved at the point where the two sections meet; a site which later became the Green Park Way ventilation shaft.

The Green Park Way shaft has both a main shaft 20 m (66 ft) wide and a smaller satellite shaft around 15 m (49 ft) in diameter, rising to 20 m (66 ft) at the base, avoiding a National Rail track 2.7 m (8.9 ft) away. They are both around 45 m (148 ft) deep. During construction, excavation involved London Clay at the surface, then granular Harwich Formation, Lambeth Group with sand lenses, Upnor Formation, and chalk. It passed through 3 intermediate aquifers, with water pressure rising to 3-4 bars in places. This was countered with grout injections and dewatering wells. Due to these conditions, steel reception chambers were needed for the TBMs, filled with foam concrete, allowing for the application of sealant before depressurisation to prevent water ingress.

Tunnel segments for the western section were made by Strabag in Hartlepool, while those for the eastern section were by Pacadar UK on the Isle of Grain, Kent, and were transported to the construction site by rail.

The bored section of the tunnel ends at the Victoria Road Crossover Box, the first "caterpillar shaft" in the UK. This is an open air shaft where trains can switch running lines before entering the tunnel, connected by a 360m long sprayed concrete lined tunnel to Old Oak Common station itself. This crossover box was also where the two TBMs which bored the eastern end of the tunnel were launched from.

The first two TBMs, with a cutter-head diameter of 9.82 m (32.2 ft), were designed to bore through Lambeth Group rock, chalk and London Clay, and assemble 4,220 tunnel segment rings each. They are named Caroline (after astronomer Caroline Herschel) and Sushila (after local school teacher Sushila Hirani, Lead for STEM at Greenford High School), arrived at the West Ruislip launch site to dig the western section of the tunnel in December 2021; with TBM Sushila launching on 6 October 2022 and Caroline following suit on 27 October.

The second pair of TBMs named Emily (after midwife and former Ealing mayor Emily Sophie Taylor) and Anne (after education reformer and philanthropist Lady Anne Byron), arrived at the Victoria Road Crossover Box for assembly and launch in late October 2023. These TBMs, with a cutter-head diameter of 9.08 m (29.8 ft), were designed to bore through London Clay. Emily launched on 25 February 2024, with Anne following suit in April.

The tunnels were all completed by 26 June 2025. The TBMs, each weighing approximately 2,050 tonnes, excavated 4.16 million tonnes of London Clay, advancing at a peak of 38 m (125 ft) a day. The TBMs, excavating 4,160,000 tonnes of London Clay, installed 94,233 segments, weighing 7 tonnes each, to form 14,300 tunnel rings in total. Excavated material was removed using a conveyor system to HS2's London Logistics Hub at Willesden Euro Terminal for reuse in other areas.

Construction of the 34 cross passages was completed by April 2026, with 11 constructed using a ground freezing technique due to water bearing soils paired with a high water table in the western section.

== Progress ==
TBM progress
Name	Section	Launch location	Launch date	Destination	Arrival date	Distance travelled
Sushila	West	West Ruislip Portal	6 October 2022	Green Park Way Ventilation Shaft, Greenford	19 December 2024	8 km (4.97 mi)
Caroline	West	West Ruislip Portal	27 October 2022	Green Park Way Ventilation Shaft, Greenford	3 April 2025	8 km (4.97 mi)
Emily	East	Victoria Road	25 February 2024	Green Park Way Ventilation Shaft, Greenford	6 June 2025	5.5 km (3.42 mi)
Anne	East	Victoria Road	9 April 2024	Green Park Way Ventilation Shaft, Greenford	26 June 2025	5.5 km (3.42 mi)

Source: HS2 Ltd.
