= History of High Speed 2 =

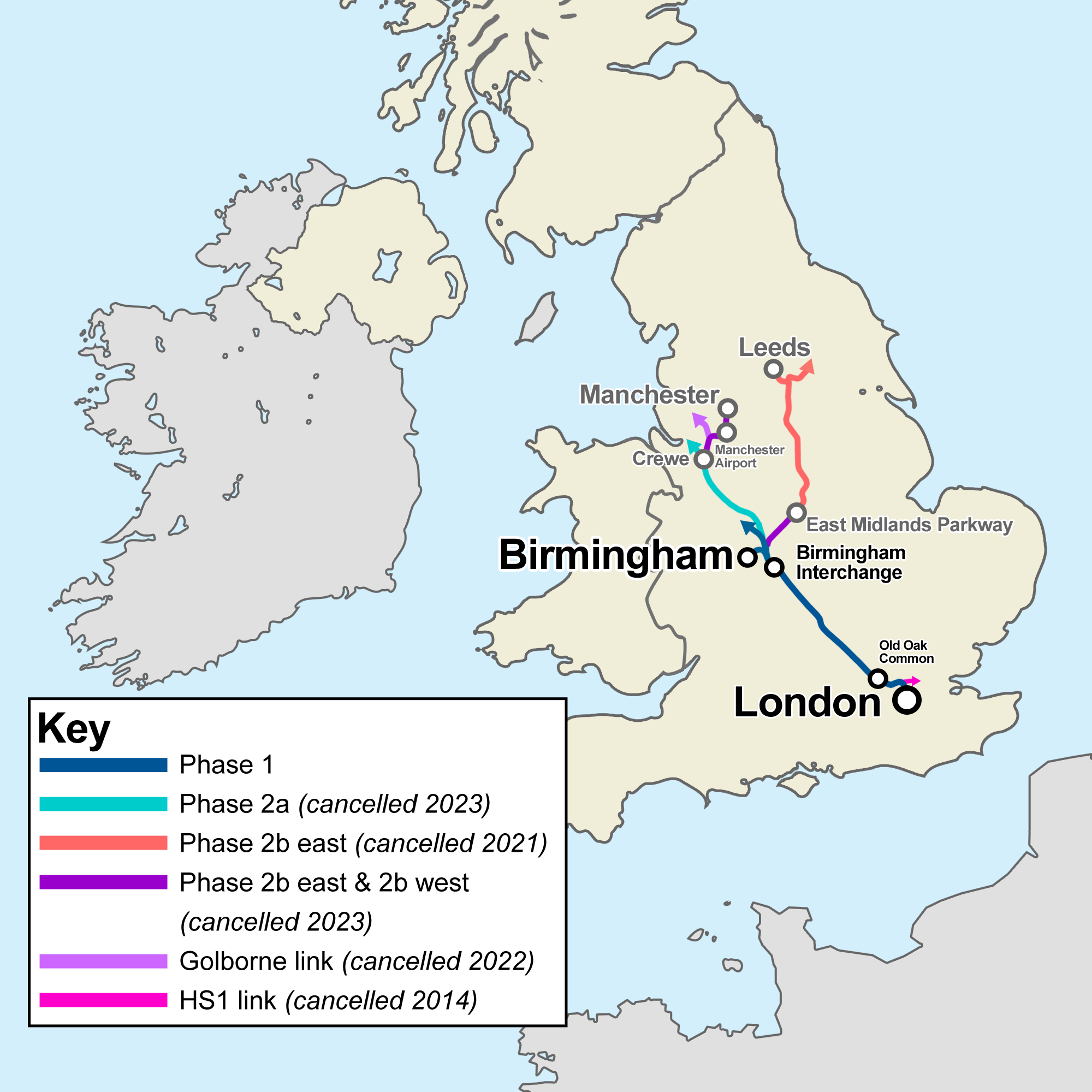
The phases of High Speed 2 with cancellation dates; only Phase 1 is being constructed

The history of High Speed 2 is the background to the planned construction of High Speed 2 (HS2), a new high-speed railway in Great Britain that was originally planned to connect London, Birmingham, Manchester and Leeds 100% on high speed track, and Glasgow, Liverpool, Newcastle upon Tyne and Sheffield using a mix of high speed track and existing conventional track.

Construction was planned in two prime phases:

1. Phase 1, from London to Handsacre near Lichfield, connecting to the north-south West Coast Main Line and a branch to Birmingham. Construction contracts were signed in 2017, with work expected to start in 2018 or 2019. Services were originally expected to begin in 2026 but by June 2025, the opening date was said to be "beyond 2033".
2. Phase 2 initially consisted of the two legs of the Y-shaped route, with the Y splitting north of Birmingham to Manchester and Leeds; with connections to the West Coast Main Line south of Wigan, East Coast Main Line south of York and the Midland Main Line at Clay Cross.
3. Later, phase 2 was split into two sub phases, 2a and 2b. Phase 2a would have been from Handsacre to Crewe, with phase 2b being the remainder of the work. Services were to start on phase 2a in 2027, and the remainder of phase 2b by 2033.

The route to Leeds was cancelled in November 2021, with the eastern branch cut back to end at East Midlands Parkway station, south of Nottingham. In June 2022 the link to the West Coast Main Line at Golborne south of Wigan was cancelled. In October 2023, the route to Manchester was cancelled, leaving only phase 1, the route from London to Handsacre running onto the WCML with a branch to Birmingham.

== Background ==
Rail passengers in Great Britain from 1829 to 2025, showing the rise in passenger numbers since 1995. The DfT argued that HS2 would help to provide capacity for the increase in passenger numbers.

High-Speed Rail Network in Europe

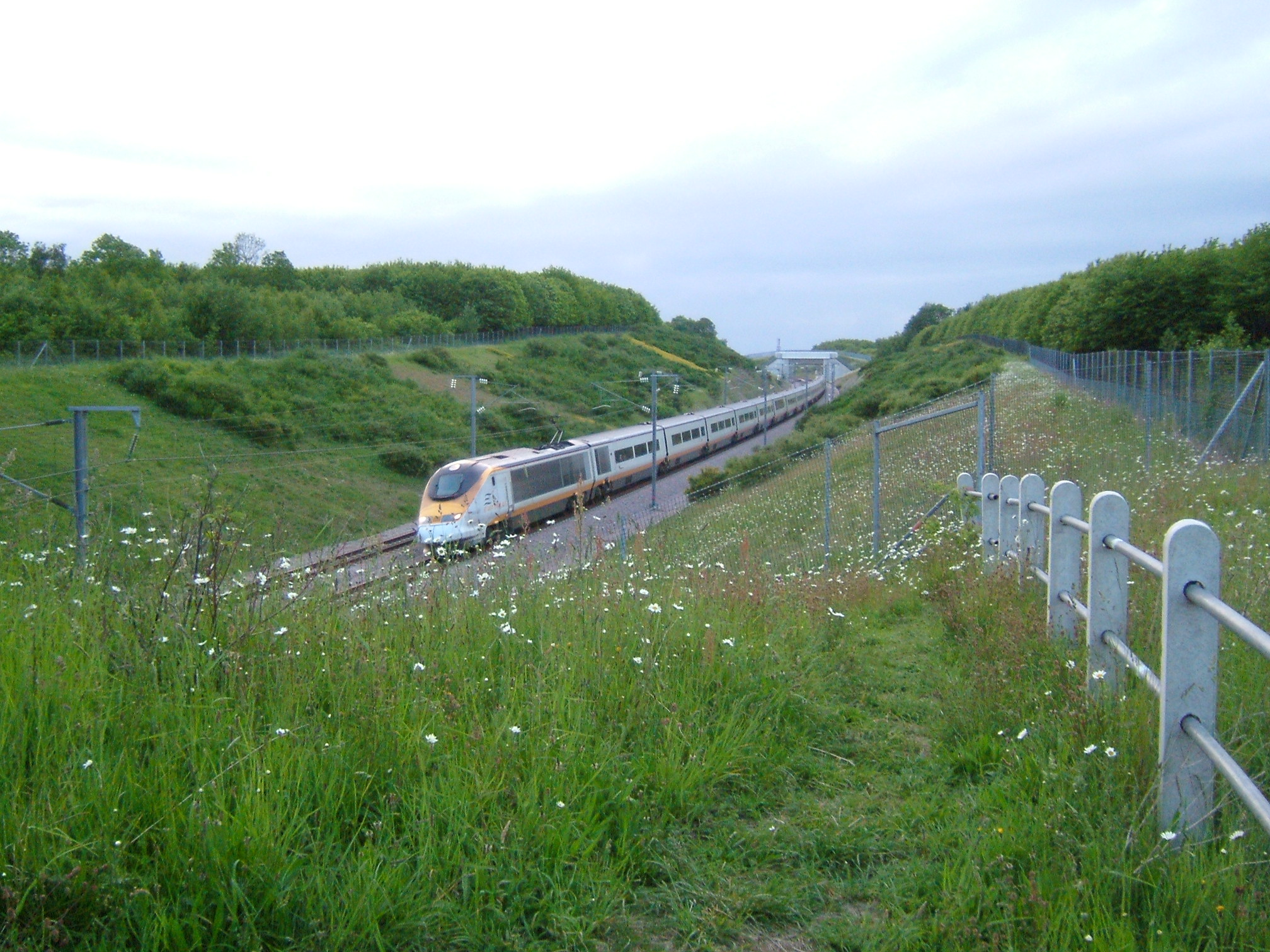
HS1 (the Channel Tunnel rail link), the first railway line in Britain with an operating speed of more than 250 km/h, photo taken in Kent in May 2007

High-speed rail has been expanding across Europe since the 1980s, with several countries – notably France, Spain and Germany – investing heavily in new lines capable of operating at over 270 km/h (170 mph). In 2009 there were reportedly 5,600 km (3,480 mi) of high-speed line in operation in Europe; a further 3,480 km (2,160 mi) were under construction and another 8,500 km (5,280 mi) were planned.

High-speed rail arrived in the United Kingdom with the opening in 2003 of the first part of High Speed 1 (then known as Channel Tunnel Rail), a 108 km (67 mi) link between London and the Channel Tunnel. The development of a second high-speed line was proposed in 2009 by the UK government to address capacity constraints on the West Coast Main Line, which was forecast to be at full capacity in 2025. Most of the British rail network was built in the Victorian era; the fastest speeds are 200 km/h (125 mph). A document published by the Department for Transport in January 2009 described an increase of 50% in rail passenger traffic and an increase of 40% in freight in the preceding ten years in the UK and detailed several infrastructure problems. The report proposed that new high-speed lines be constructed to address these issues and, following assessment of various options, concluded that the most appropriate initial route for a new line was from London to the West Midlands.

== Initial plans ==
=== High Speed Two Limited ===
In January 2009 the UK government announced the creation of High Speed Two (HS2) Limited (HS2 Ltd). Sir David Rowlands, was appointed as chairman and asked to examine the case for a new high-speed line and present a potential route between London and the West Midlands. The government report suggested that the line could be extended to reach Scotland.

Drawing on consultations carried out for the Department for Transport (DfT) and Network Rail, HS2 Ltd would provide advice on options for a Heathrow International interchange station, access to central London, connectivity with HS1 and the existing rail network, and financing and construction, and report to the government on the first stage by the end of 2009.

In August 2009 Network Rail published its own study independent of HS2's work, outlining somewhat different proposals for the expansion of the railway network, which included a new high-speed rail line between London and Glasgow/Edinburgh, following a route through the West Midlands and the North-West of England.

For the HS2 report, a route was investigated to an accuracy of 50 centimetres (18 in). In December 2009 HS2 Ltd presented its report to the government. The study investigated the possibility of links to Heathrow Airport and connections with Crossrail, the Great Western Main Line, and the Channel Tunnel Rail Link (HS1), as displayed in the map shown.

On 11 March 2010 the HS2 report and supporting studies were published, together with the government's command paper on high-speed rail.

=== Conservative–Liberal Democrat coalition government review ===
The Conservative–Liberal Democrat coalition, on taking office in May 2010, undertook a review of HS2 plans inherited from the previous government. The Conservative Party in opposition had backed the idea of a high-speed terminus at St Pancras with a direct link to Heathrow Airport and had adopted a policy to connect London, Manchester, Leeds and Birmingham with Heathrow by high-speed rail with construction starting in 2015. In March 2010, Conservative Shadow Transport Secretary Theresa Villiers had stated "The idea that some kind of Wormwood Scrubs International station is the best rail solution for Heathrow is just not credible".

The new Transport Secretary, Philip Hammond, asked Lord Mawhinney, a former Conservative Transport Secretary, to conduct an urgent review of the proposed route. The coalition government wished the high-speed line to be routed via Heathrow Airport, an idea rejected by HS2 Ltd.

Mawhinney's conclusions contradicted Villiers' view and Conservative policy in opposition, stating that HS2 should not go to Heathrow Airport until it reaches northern England. Routing the whole line via Heathrow would add seven minutes to the journey time of all services.

In December 2008 an article in The Economist noted the increasing political popularity of high-speed rail in Britain as a solution to transport congestion, and as an alternative to unpopular schemes such as road-tolls and runway expansion, but concluded that its future would depend on it being commercially viable. In November 2010 Philip Hammond stated that government support for HS2 did not require it to break even directly (financially), what The Economist had called the "financial viability" test for new rail infrastructure:

If we used financial accounting we would never have any public spending, we would build nothing ... Financial accounting would strike a dagger through the whole case for public sector investment.

=== Public consultation ===
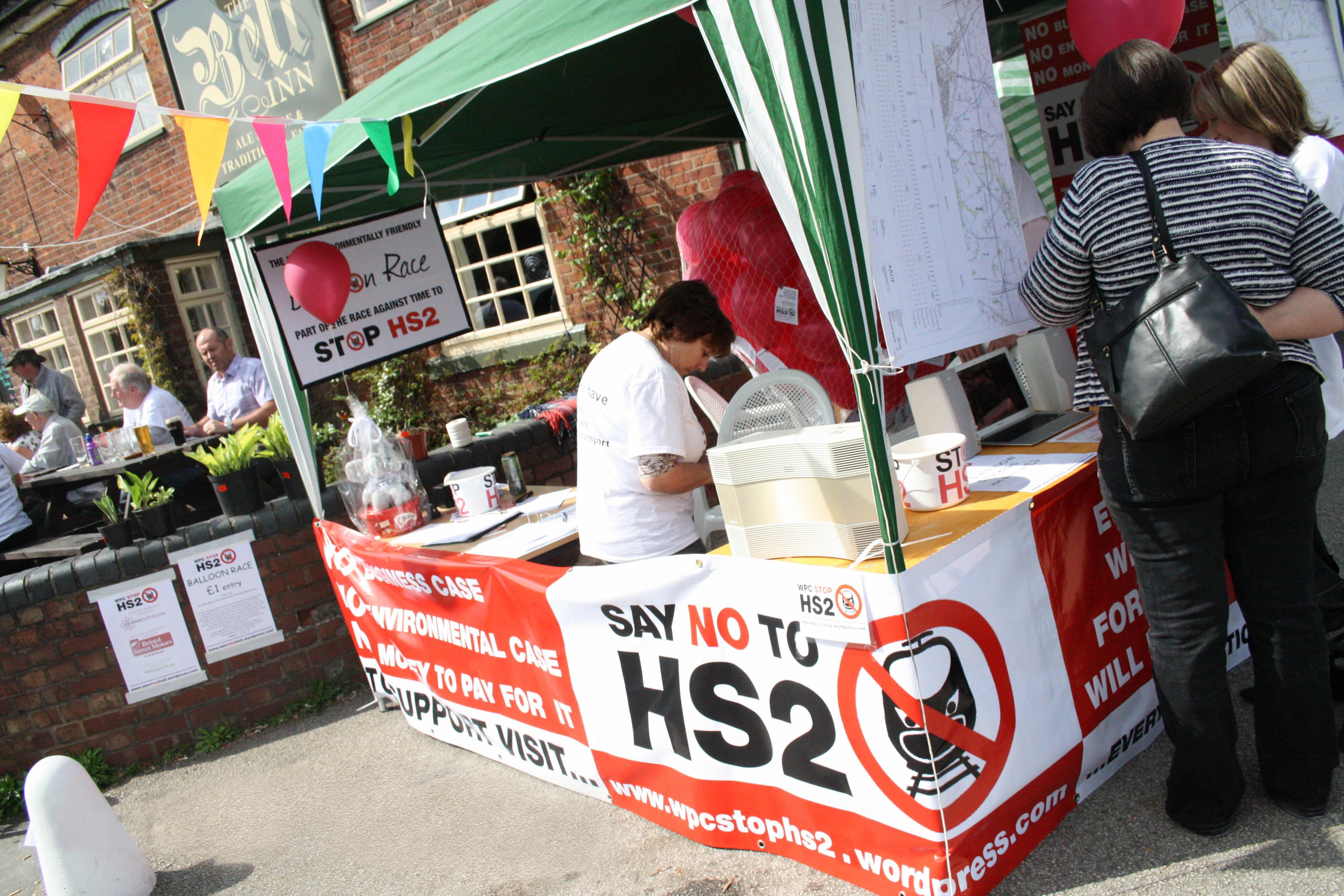
HS2 opponents have organised protest events in towns along the planned route

On 20 December 2010 the government published a slightly revised line of route for public consultation, based on a Y-shaped route from London to Birmingham with branches to Leeds and Manchester, as originally put forward by Lord Adonis as Secretary of State for Transport under the previous Labour government, with alterations designed to minimise the visual, noise, and other environmental impacts of the line. In a statement to parliament, the Secretary of State confirmed that the first phase of construction would include a high-speed line from London to Birmingham as well as a connection to High Speed 1.

High-speed lines north of the West Midlands would be built in later stages, and a link to Heathrow Airport would be initially provided by a connection at Old Oak Common, with a high-speed link to the airport to be added later. The high-speed line would connect to the existing network, allowing through trains from London to northern destinations. The consultation documents were published on 11 February 2011 with the consultation period set to run until July 2011.

The proposals for HS2 attracted criticism from various campaign groups and political organisations. A number of pressure groups were formed to protest against the construction of HS2, among them Stop HS2, AGAHST (Action Groups Against High Speed Two) and the HS2 Action Alliance (HS2AA), and protest events were organised in communities along the proposed route.

== Decision to proceed with HS2 ==
In January 2012 the Secretary of State for Transport, Justine Greening, announced that HS2 would go ahead. It would comprise a "Y-shaped" network with stations at London, Birmingham, Leeds, Manchester, Sheffield and the East Midlands, conveying up to 26,000 people each hour at speeds of up to 400 kilometres per hour (250 mph). It would be built in two stages. Phase One would be a 225 km (140 mi) route from London to the West Midlands, to be constructed by 2026. Phase Two, from Birmingham to both Leeds and Manchester, would be constructed by 2033; consultation on this phase would begin in early 2014, with a final route chosen by the end of 2014. Additional tunnelling and other measures to meet local communities' and environmental concerns were also announced. The legislative process would be achieved through two hybrid bills, one for each phase.

=== Preparation bill ===
The High Speed Rail (Preparation) Bill was passed by 350 votes to 34 in the House of Commons on 31 October 2013. The bill then faced further scrutiny in the House of Lords. This legislation releases funds to pay for surveys, buy property and compensate evicted residents. On 21 November 2013, royal assent was obtained and the bill became law as the High Speed Rail (Preparation) Act 2013.

=== Hybrid bill ===
To implement the HS2 proposals, the government introduced on behalf of HS2 Ltd two hybrid bills, one for each phase, as the railway will impact on private individuals and organisations along the route or elsewhere. Each bill is required to address the environmental impact and how this will be mitigated, and to allow individuals affected to petition parliament to seek amendments or assurances. The timeline required for the legislation relating to the construction and operation of Phase One to be introduced to parliament towards the end of 2013 and to pass into law by the spring of 2015. Parliament's second reading of the hybrid bill for Phase One took place on 28 April 2014 and was approved by 452 votes to 41. The hybrid bill for phase 2 will be prepared for January 2015.

A legal requirement of the hybrid bill is the production and deposition of an environmental impact assessment (EIA) to identify the significant impacts on the community, property, landscape, visual amenity, biodiversity, surface and ground water, archaeology, traffic, transport, waste and resources. Proposals to avoid, reduce or remedy significant adverse impacts through mitigation measures are also required. HS2 Ltd announced its intention to consult on the 'scope and methodology' of the EIA in April 2012 and based on this will publish a draft environmental statement on which it intends to consult with national bodies and local authorities and community forums along the route, in the spring of 2013.

On 23 March 2016, the House of Commons passed the HS2 hybrid bill at its third reading. On 24 January 2017, the Bill went to the report stage in the House of Lords and this was followed by the Third Reading in the House of Lords. The Bill received Royal Assent on 23 February 2017, and passed into law as the High Speed Rail (London - West Midlands) Act 2017.

=== Legal challenges ===
At the end of March 2012 the Berkshire, Buckinghamshire and Oxfordshire Wildlife Trust (BBOWT) announced that it had submitted a complaint to the European Commission that the UK government, in failing to carry out a strategic environmental assessment ahead of deciding on the route of Phase One of HS2, was in breach of European Union legislation. BBOWT said that the complaint would only be considered by the EU Commission after the UK Courts had concluded consideration of various judicial reviews submitted to them.

In April 2012 five requests for judicial review were submitted, two by HS2 Action Alliance (HS2AA) — including R (HS2 Action Alliance Ltd) v Secretary of State for Transport — and one each by the 51m Group, Aylesbury Park Golf Club, and Heathrow Hub Ltd. In its applications HS2AA claimed that the government failed to carry out a proper strategic environmental assessment and that it provided inadequate information to the public during the public consultation. As a consequence the HS2AA claimed that the Secretary of State's decision to approve Phase One of HS2 was made without proper justification, that it ignored the government's own processes and assessment criteria, and relied on undisclosed material.

In a separate judicial review request the 51m Group challenged the government on several grounds, ranging from a failure to consult properly on the original or the revised route, consideration of the impact of HS2 on the London Underground network, and the environmental impact on the Chilterns Area of Outstanding Natural Beauty. 51m also claimed that the hybrid bill approach was 'incompatible with the Environmental Impact Assessment Directive. Aylesbury Park Golf Club's proceedings are based on the impact of the proposed route which will pass through part of the club. Heathrow Hub Ltd, a company owned by Arup, announced it has also started proceedings on the grounds that the UK Government could choose an alternative route which would provide an improved connection between HS2 and Crossrail via a transport hub built on land owned by the company.

At the end of July 2012 permission was received from the High Court for the five judicial reviews to proceed with individual hearings set for an eight-day period in early December 2012. The High Court confirmed that the cases of the HS2AA, 51M and Heathrow Hub, whose consultation responses had been lost by HS2 Ltd, could be amended to incorporate this defect in their claims. A further hearing was set for October 2012 for the Government to explain its position of not releasing passenger data relating on the West Coast Main Line.

On 15 March 2013 the High Court rejected all but one of the claims as part of the judicial review. allowing a claim in respect of property blight and associated compensation. the section allowing the point relating to property blight was contained in paragraph 843 of the judgment and stated "The consultation process in respect of blight and compensation was all in all so unfair as to be unlawful." Permission to appeal has been granted on two grounds: applicability of Strategic Environmental Assessment to the project and re-consultation of 'optimised alternative'.

In July 2013 the Court of Appeal declined the appeal of the refusal to allow the judicial review.

=== Contracts ===
In August 2017, the contracts for the civil engineering part of Phase One of HS2 were signed with a total value of around £6 billion. The contractors included Balfour Beatty and joint ventures SCS JV (Skanska, Costain, Strabag), Align JV (Bouygues, VolkerFitzpatrick, Sir Robert McAlpine) and CEK JV (Carillion, Eiffage, Kier).

In early 2018, the two projects awarded to CEK JV became shared 50/50 between Eiffage and Kier, following the collapse of Carillion.

== Choice of route ==
=== Phase One – London to the West Midlands ===
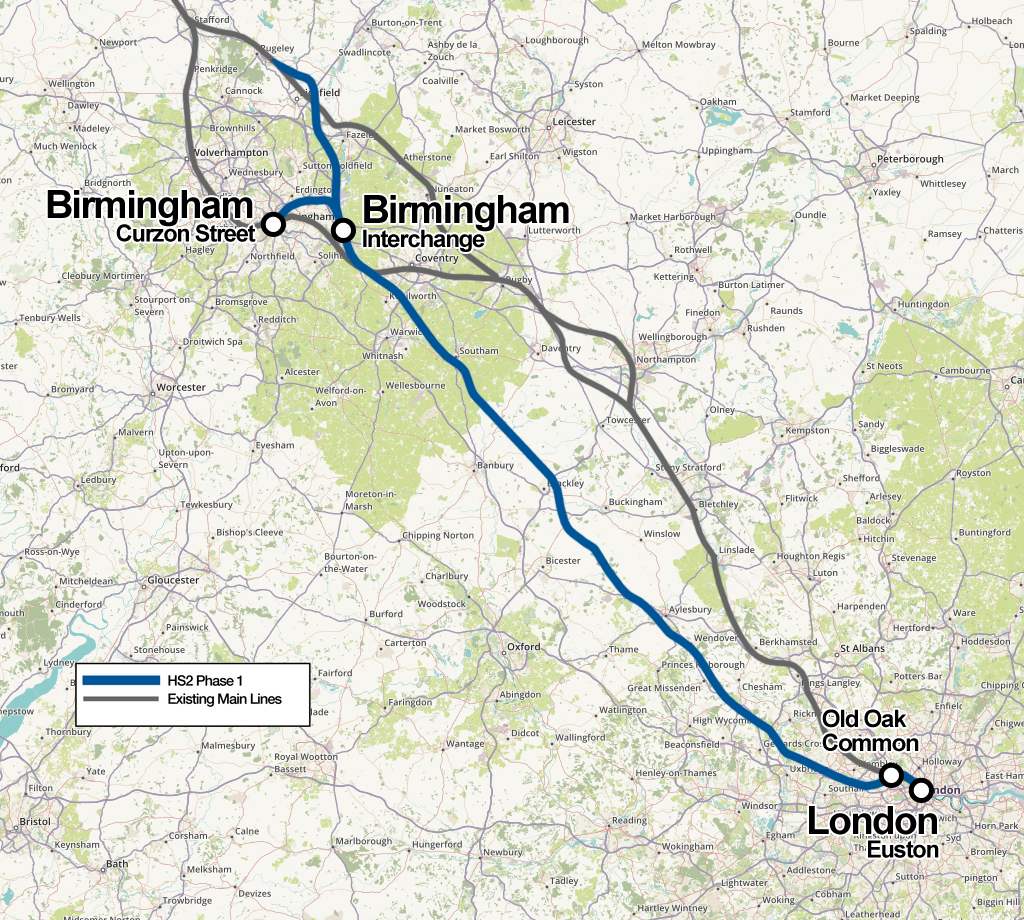
Proposed route of the London–Birmingham section (published January 2012)

Phase One is a north westerly route extending from London Euston to just north of Lichfield in Staffordshire where the line branches onto the northbound classic WCML. The line skirts the east of Birmingham with a branch to the proposed new Birmingham Curzon Street station. The phase will provide services to the North West of England and Scotland via a combination of HS2 and the WCML track using classic compatible trains.

As proposed in March 2010, the line would run from London Euston mostly in a tunnel, to an interchange with Crossrail west of London Paddington, then along the Acton–Northolt line ("New North Main Line") past West Ruislip and alongside the Chiltern Main Line with a 4.0 km (2.5 mi) viaduct over the Grand Union Canal and River Colne, and then from the M25 to Amersham in a new 10 km (6 mi) tunnel. After emerging from the tunnel, the line would run parallel to the existing A413 road and London to Aylesbury Line, through the 47 km (29 mi) wide Chiltern Hills Area of Outstanding Natural Beauty, passing close by Great Missenden to the east, alongside Wendover immediately to the west, then on to Aylesbury. After Aylesbury, the line would run alongside the Aylesbury–Claydon Junction line, joining it north of Quainton Road and then striking out to the north-west across open countryside through North Buckinghamshire, Oxfordshire, South Northamptonshire, Warwickshire and Staffordshire terminating the phase at Lichfield with a connection onto the WCML. The line would be operative and trains moving onto the classic track WCML while phase 2 is built.

Several alignments were studied, and in September 2010 HS2 Ltd set out recommendations for altering the course at certain locations.

In December 2010 the Transport Secretary announced several amendments to the route aimed at mitigating vibration, noise, or visual impact. These changes include, at Primrose Hill, in north London, moving the tunnel 100 m (330 ft) further north, and in west London reducing the width of the Northolt Corridor; lowering the alignment and creating a 900 m (3,000 ft) green tunnel in Buckinghamshire at South Heath; at nearby Amersham, where two footpaths would otherwise be severed, at Chipping Warden in Northamptonshire and Burton Green in Warwickshire, green bridges would be constructed; the alignment would be moved away from the settlements of Brackley, in Northamptonshire, Ladbroke and Stoneleigh in Warwickshire and Lichfield in southern Staffordshire, and from the Grade I listed buildings Hartwell House in Buckinghamshire and Edgcote House in Northamptonshire.

In January 2012 the Transport Secretary announced further revisions to the Phase One route. The key revisions included a new 4.3 km (2.7 mi) tunnel at South Ruislip avoiding the Chiltern Line and mitigating the impact in the Ruislip area; realignment of the route and extension of the continuous tunnel, originally from the M25 to Amersham, to near Little Missenden; at Wendover and nearby South Heath extension to the green tunnels to reduce impact on local communities; an extension to the green tunnel beside Chipping Warden and Aston Le Walls; and realignment to avoid heritage sites around Edgcote. The revised route would comprise 36.2 km (22.5 mi) in tunnel or green tunnel compared to 23.3 km (14.5 mi), a 55% increase. Overall, 127 km (79 mi) of the 230 km (140 mi) route will be in tunnel or cutting, while 64 km (40 mi) will be on viaduct or embankment, a reduction of 16 km (10 mi) from the route in the original consultation documents.

In April 2013 a decision by HS2 Ltd and the Department for Transport to recommend further bore tunnelling under the 9 km (6 mi) 'Northolt Corridor' in the London Borough of Ealing was announced in an HS2 Ltd press release. The tunnel will minimise blight for residents and businesses and eliminate the substantial impact of traffic which a surface route would otherwise have caused. The further bore tunnelling will link up the tunnels already planned beneath South Ruislip and Ruislip Gardens and Old Oak Common to North Acton. HS2 Ltd found in a study they had undertaken that bored tunnelling this specific stretch of the HS2 route will take 15 months less time than constructing a surface HS2 route through this area. In addition the costs will be neutral. The cost neutrality is due to the fact that 20 bridge replacements, including three and a half years to replace both road bridges at the Hanger Lane Gyratory System, amenity disruption, the construction of two tunnel portals and the likelihood of substantial compensation payments will all be avoided. The proposed tunnel will be included as the preferred option in the draft Environmental Statement for the first phase of HS2. The decision to recommend tunnelling the section of HS2 route through the London Borough of Ealing has been well received and has been billed as a victory for local residents and local grassroots activism. In addition to preventing blight to homes, schools and businesses the decision will also help to preserve the tranquility of Perivale Wood, an ancient wood, bird sanctuary and Britain's second oldest nature reserve, Tunnelling HS2 in this section of the route will additionally free up the Acton–Northolt line for future local rail services.

In November 2015, the Chancellor, George Osborne, announced that the HS2 line would be extended to Crewe by 2027, reducing journey times from London to Crewe by 35 minutes. The section from Lichfield to Crewe is phase 2a and will be simultaneously built with Phase One, effectively merging phase 2a with Phase One. The Crewe Hub will be built as part of phase 2a.

==== High-speed Crewe hub ====
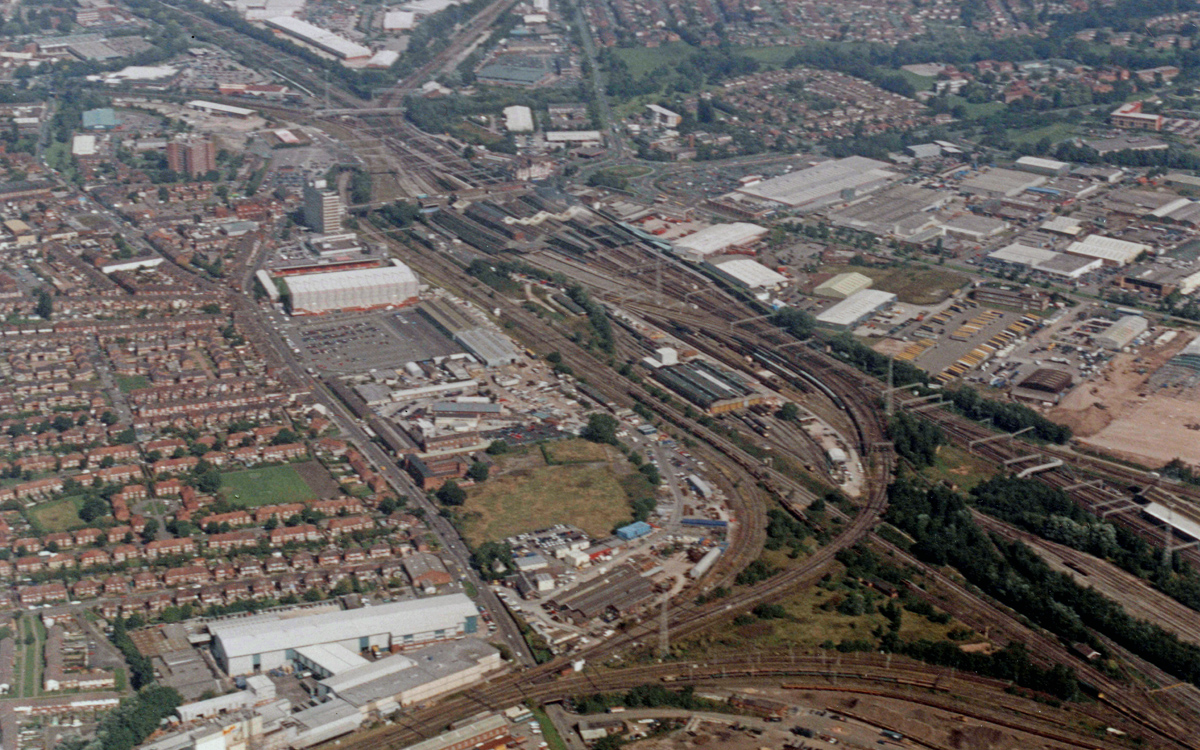
Crewe station looking NE showing the six converging classic railway lines in August 2005

Sir David Higgins, the chairman of HS2 Ltd, proposed a high-speed hub at the Crewe junction, which was not a part of Phase One, but would be built simultaneously with Phase One. Crewe is currently a major rail junction with six radiating classic lines to: Scotland/Liverpool, Birmingham/London, Chester, Shrewsbury, Stoke and Manchester. The intention is for high-speed trains to run off the northbound HS2 line into the high-speed hub and out onto classic lines without passing through the bottleneck of the existing Crewe station, maintaining high line speeds. The hub's advantage is that many more regions and cities can be accessed via a combination of HS2 and classic lines, giving overall superior journey times. A new station is proposed as a part of the high-speed hub. Higgins aims to have the HS2 line from Birmingham to Crewe, which is in Phase 2a of the project, and the high-speed Crewe Hub, incorporated in the Phase One construction plan. On 30 November 2015 it was announced that completion of the Crewe hub would be brought forward to 2027.

The proposed hub is to be located at the site of the existing station, which will access all classic lines radiating from Crewe. A branch from HS2 to the WCML north of Crewe is being considered. This will enable trains to pass under and by-pass the high-speed hub and run onto the WCML.

==== Heathrow access ====
Proposals have been considered for several years for the construction of a spur connecting the HS2 route to Heathrow Airport.

While in opposition, the Conservative Party outlined plans in their 2009 policy paper to construct a high-speed line connecting London to Birmingham, Leeds and Manchester, with connections to cities on the Great Western main line (Bristol and Cardiff) and a long-term aim of linking to Scotland. It also expressed support for a plan put forward by the engineering firm Arup for a new Heathrow Hub which would include a link connecting Heathrow Airport to the new high-speed rail route and to the Channel Tunnel Rail Link, with the possibility of connections to European destinations.

Arup had previously suggested in Heathrow Hub Arup Submission to HS2 that an 80 ha (200-acre) site at the Thorney part of Iver, north-east of the intersection of the M25 and M4, could house a railway station of 12 or more platforms, as well as a coach and bus station and a 6th airport terminal. Under this proposal, the high-speed line would then follow a different route to Birmingham, running parallel to existing motorways and railways as with HS1 in Kent.

According to Lord Mawhinney's July 2010 report, the Heathrow station should be directly beneath Heathrow Central station (not at Iver, as proposed by Arup) and the London terminus for HS2 should be at the 2018 Crossrail station Old Oak Common, not Euston. This plan, properly named "A Heathrow Hub with Old Oak Common terminus", was initially supported by the Conservative Party, although in the final consultation plan, HS2 was proposed to terminate at Euston with a high-speed spur to Heathrow.

In December 2010 the government announced that a high-speed connection with Heathrow Airport would be built as part of the second phase of the project and that until then connections would be made at Old Oak Common, where HS2 would have an interchange station with the Heathrow Express and Crossrail. However, in March 2015 the then transport minister Patrick McLoughlin stated to the House of Commons that the proposed Heathrow spur would no longer be considered as part of Phase One or Phase 2 of the HS2 scheme.

==== Link to High Speed 1 ====
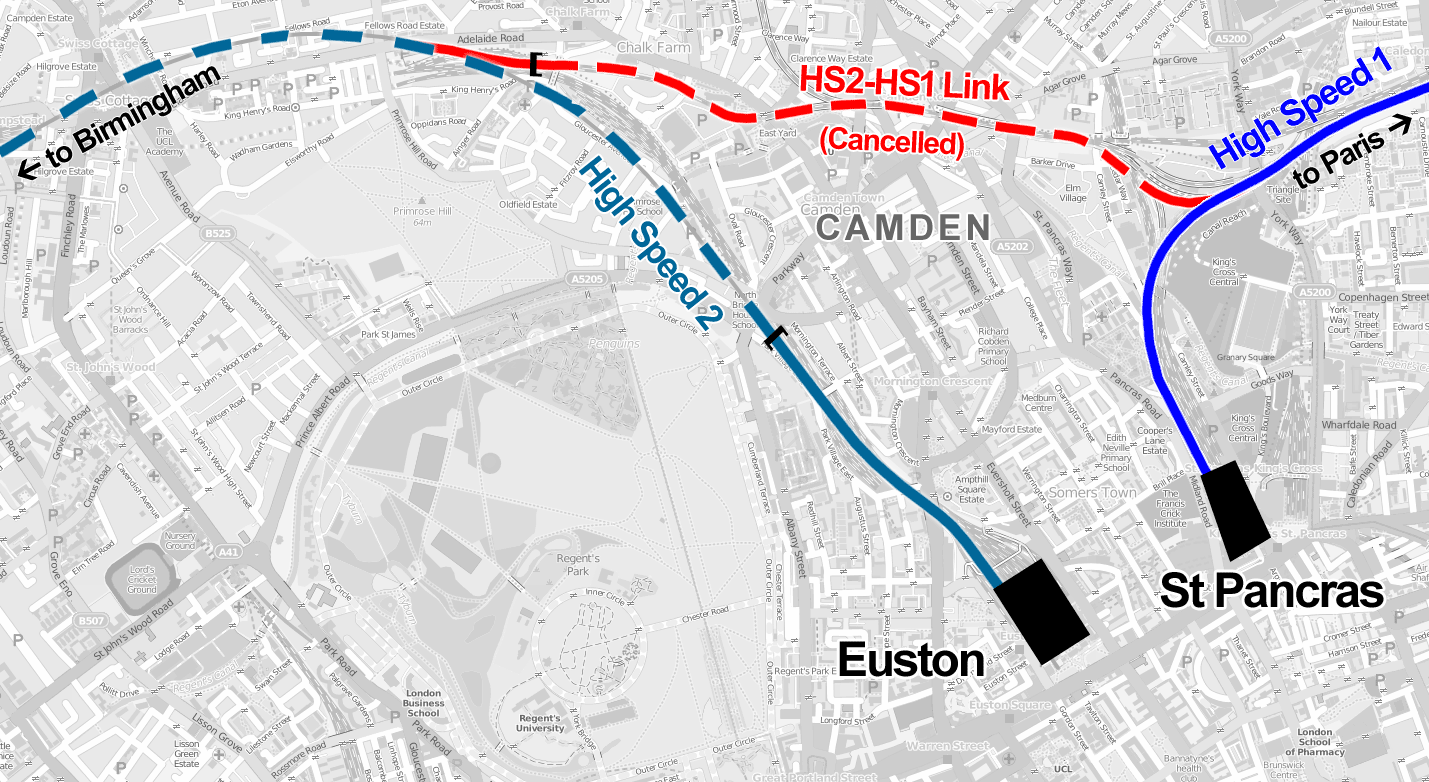
Map showing the proposed HS1–HS2 link across Camden, as proposed in 2010

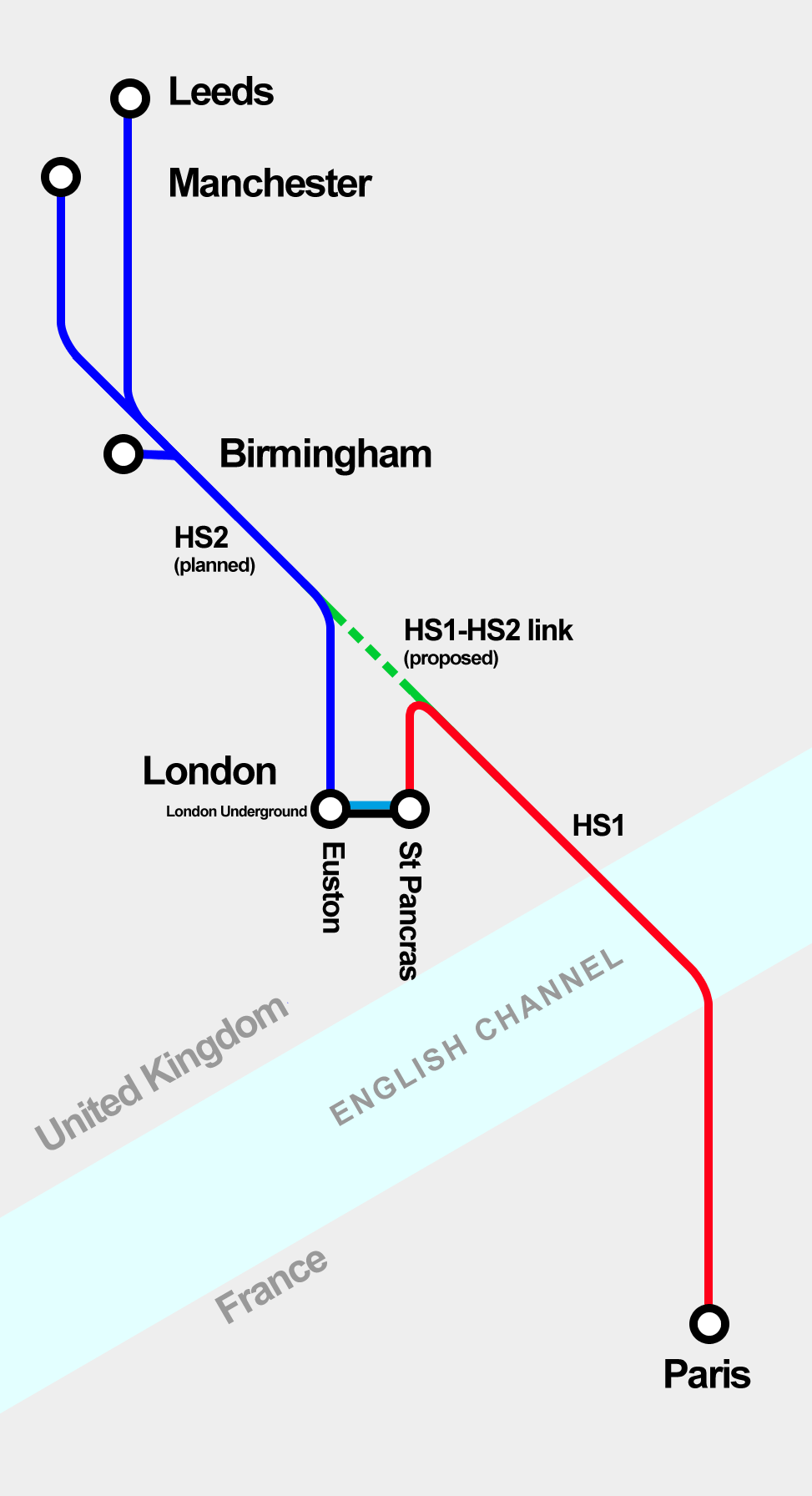
Diagram showing the destinations of HS1 & HS2 in the UK and France with the proposed link (not to scale)

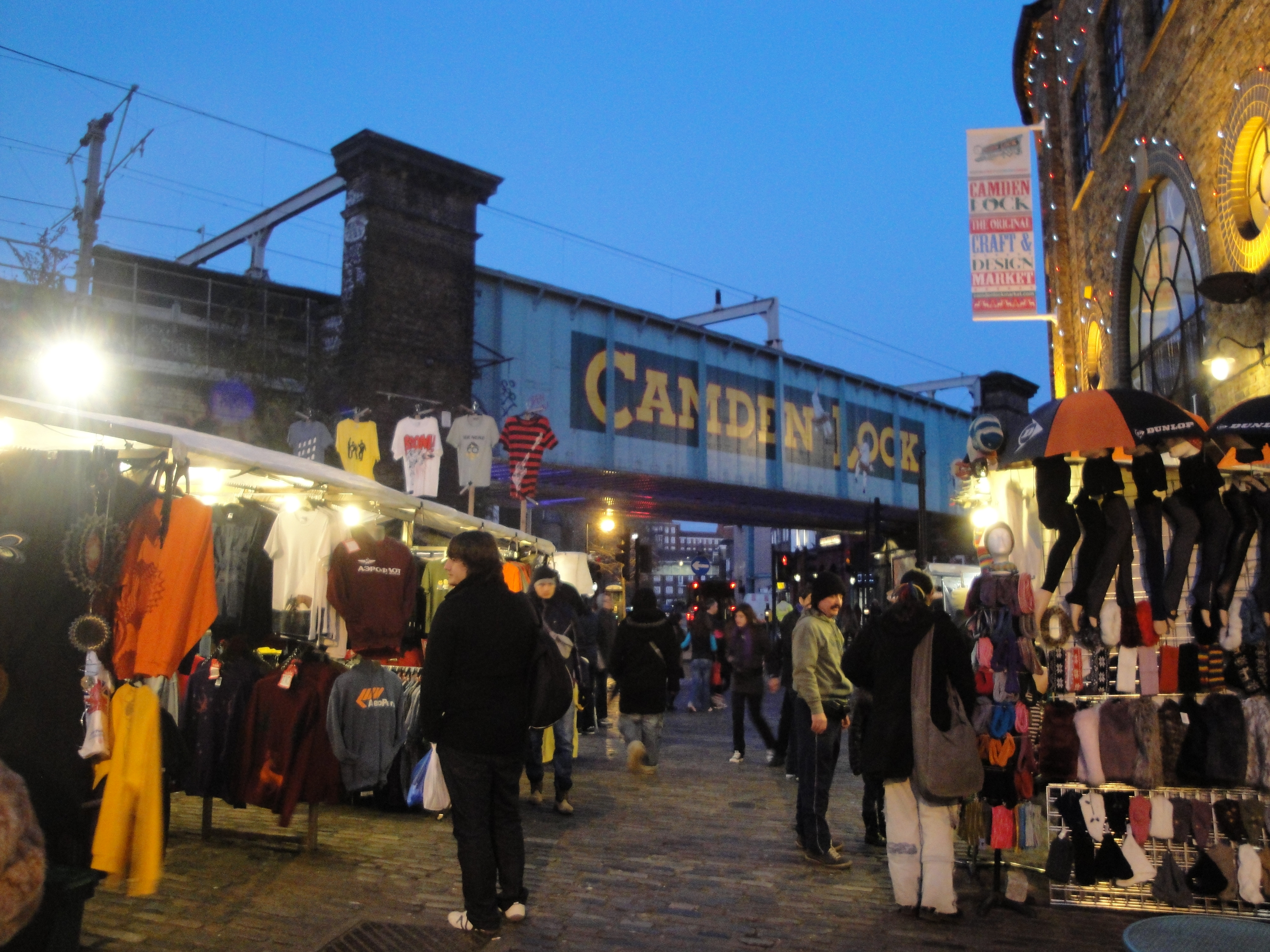
The section of North London Line proposed for the HS1 link, as it passes over Camden Lock railway bridge across Chalk Farm Road, photo taken in December 2011

The proposed route of HS2 into London will bring the line very close to the existing High Speed 1 (HS1) line which terminates at St Pancras station; at their closest points, the two high-speed lines will be only 640 m (0.4 mi) apart. The Department for Transport initially outlined plans to link the two high-speed lines in order to allow HS2 trains from the North of England to bypass London Euston and connect straight to HS1. This connection would have enabled direct rail services to be run from Manchester, Leeds and Birmingham to Paris, Brussels and other continental European destinations, realising the aims of the Regional Eurostar scheme, first proposed in the 1980s.

Several possible solutions were considered. In 2010 the Government command paper stated:

...the new British high speed rail network should be connected to the wider European high speed rail network via High Speed One and the Channel Tunnel, subject to cost and value for money. This could be achieved through either or both of a dedicated rapid transport system linking Euston and St Pancras and a direct rail link to High Speed One.

The March 2010 engineering study conducted by Arup for HS2 Ltd costed a "classic speed" GC loading gauge direct HS2–HS1 rail link at £458 million (single track) or £812 million (double track). This link would go from Old Oak Common feeding into the High Speed 1 network at St Pancras, via tunnel and the North London Line with a high-level junction north of St Pancras station for non-stopping services. The study found that double-track high-speed connection on the same route would cost £3.6bn (4.4 times greater than for classic speed). The Department for Transport HS2 report of the same date recommended that, if a direct rail link is built, it should be the classic-speed, double-track option.

This route proposal was supported by Arup's final report in December 2010, which concluded the best option would be to construct a tunnel between Old Oak Common and Chalk Farm, and then to use existing widened lines along the North London Line to connect to HS1 north of St Pancras. The proposed connection would be built to GC loading gauge and would not be suitable for trains running at high speed. Detailed route plans published in January 2012 indicate a 2-kilometre (1.2 mi) link which runs from a tunnel exit just west of the former Primrose Hill railway station, eastwards along the route of the North London Line and joining HS2 at a bridge junction on the west side of York Way.

Estimated journey times for direct trains running between British cities and Paris were published by HS2 Ltd in 2012. These estimates assumed a high-speed rail journey using both HS1 and both completed phases of HS2:

Paris to/from:	Standard journey time before HS2	Fastest journey time using HS2 (P1 & P2)
Birmingham	4:42	3:07
Manchester	5:37	3:38
Leeds	5:47	3:38

Concerns were raised by Camden London Borough Council about the impact on housing, Camden Market and other local businesses from construction work and bridge widening along the proposed railway link. In August 2012 the Secretary of State for Transport, Justine Greening, asked HS2 Ltd to consider alternative routes for connecting HS2 and HS1. An alternative scheme for the HS1–HS2 link was put forward by Transport for London (TfL), who proposed incorporating the link into the projected Crossrail 2 route (see below). Prior to the debate on the HS2 Bill in Parliament, Sir David Higgins, chairman of HS2 Ltd, expressed the view that the Camden railway link was "sub-optimal" and recommended that it should be omitted from the parliamentary bill. He stated that HS2 passengers travelling from the North of England to continental Europe would be able to transfer easily from Euston to St Pancras by London Underground in order to continue their journey on HS1. He also recommended that alternative plans should be drawn up to link the high-speed lines in the future. The then Mayor of London, Boris Johnson, proposed that an HS1-HS2 link should be provided by boring a tunnel under Camden to reduce the impact on the local area.

In order to mitigate the problems foreseen in Camden and to save £700 million from the budget, the two-kilometre-long (1.2 mi) HS1–HS2 link was removed from the High Speed Rail (London – West Midlands) Bill at the second reading stage.

An alternative solution to the issue of linking HS1 and HS2 was suggested by a former director of projects at British Rail, Dick Keegan, who recommended in January 2013 that HS2 should not terminate at Euston but at Stratford International instead, offering direct links to HS1 and on to continental Europe and greater capacity. Rapid transit into central London would be provided from Stratford Regional station.

The Chairman of the National Infrastructure Commission, Lord Adonis, said on 10 January 2017 in the House of Commons: “On the face of it, it seems absurd that there is not a connection between the two [HS1 and HS2], but because the service would be so intermittent - with the best will in the world, only a few trains a day would run on that service - I very much doubt it would be taken up in any big way." He added that airlines already offered enough cheap services from the Continent to Birmingham and Manchester.

=== Phase 2 – West Midlands to Manchester and Leeds ===
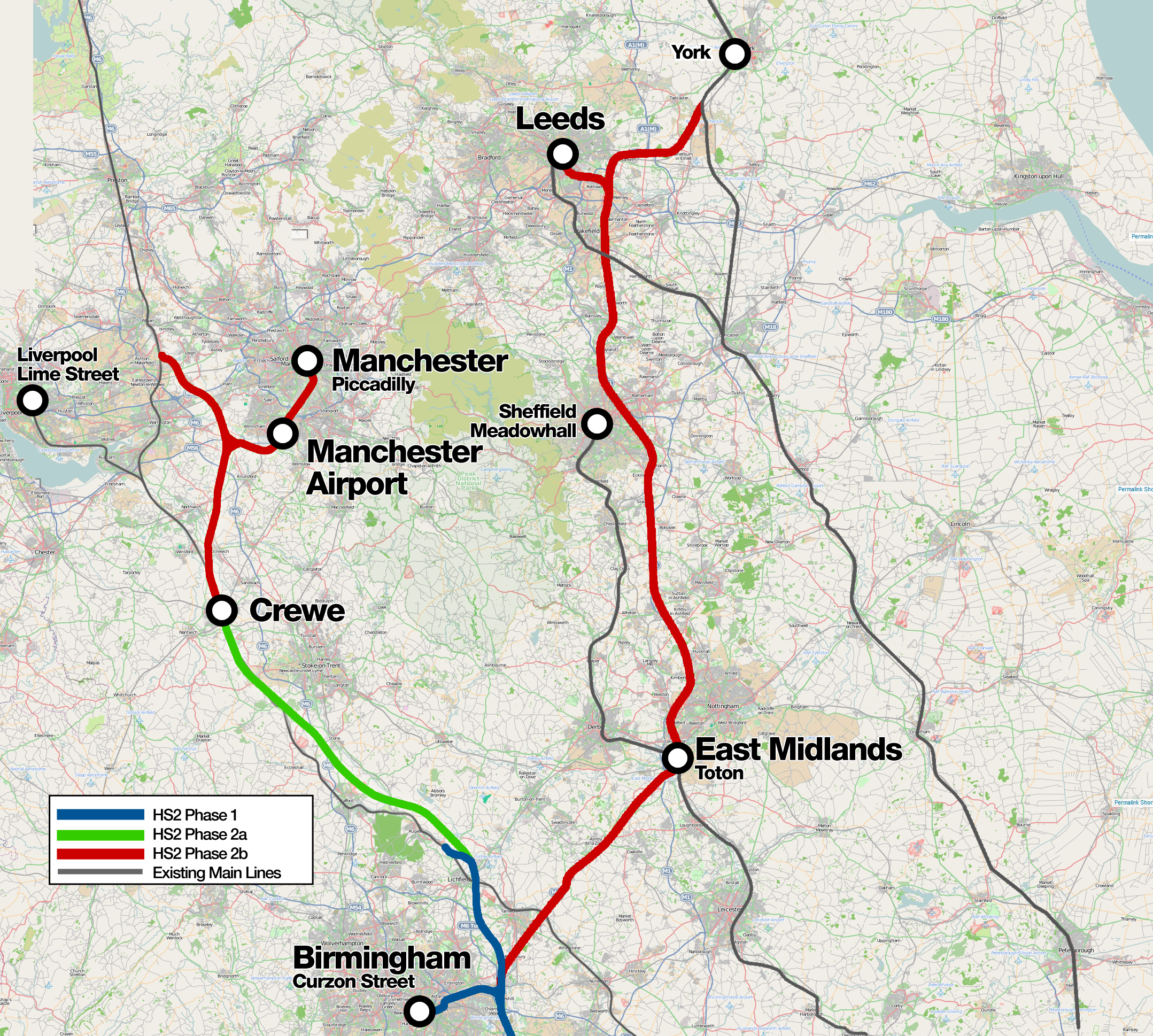
Phase 2 of HS2 to Leeds and Manchester

Phase two was to create two branch lines from Birmingham running north either side of the Pennines creating a "Y" network. Phase 2 is split into two phases, phase 2a and 2b. Phase 2a is the section from Lichfield to Crewe on the western section of the "Y" and phase 2b the remainder of phase 2.

The western section:

This section of the "Y" route extends north from Lichfield connecting to the northbound classic WCML at Bamfurlong south of Wigan taking services to Scotland, with a branch to the existing Manchester Piccadilly station. A branch onto the WCML at Crewe takes trains on classic track 64 km (40 mi) forty miles into Liverpool.

The eastern section:

This section of the "Y" branches at Coleshill to the east of Birmingham and routes north to just before York where it connects onto the northbound classic ECML projecting services to the North East of England and Scotland. The line from Birmingham northbound will incorporate the proposed East Midlands Hub located at Toton between Derby and Nottingham. The East Midlands Hub will serve Derby, Leicester and Nottingham. The initial plan was for the line to serve Sheffield directly via a new raised station adjacent to Tinsley Viaduct, near to Meadowhall Interchange. This met with opposition from Sheffield Council, which lobbied for the line to be routed via a spur to the site of the former Sheffield Victoria Station. It was claimed that the initial proposed route, which incorporated a viaduct 6 tracks wide along a two mile long viaduct across the Don valley would have sat on a major geological fault with flooded historic mine workings below. Sheffield Council's alternate route was rejected in favour of a route along existing tracks. The new proposed route is to connect the HS2 route to existing lines near to Clay Cross, in Derbyshire, going via Sheffield station before rejoining HS2 east of Grimethorpe. A branch will take the line to new high speed platforms constructed onto the side of the existing Leeds station. Consultation on the route is planned to take place in 2014, with the line is expected to be built by 2033. The Leeds branch would diverge just north of Coleshill and head in a north-easterly direction roughly parallel to the M42 motorway. A high speed spur line will serve Leeds, with the main line of the branch heading north-east to meet the East Coast Main Line near York.

The Manchester branch would be an extension of the Phase One line north of Lichfield north of the connecting spur to the West Coast Main Line (WCML). The line will continue north, with a second connection to the WCML at Crewe junction. A high-speed station will not be built at Crewe. At Millington in Cheshire, the line will divide at a triangular junction, with the Manchester branch veering east, a connecting spur to the West Coast Main Line and a third line linking the Manchester branch to the West Coast Main Line. Close to Manchester Airport, the route will enter a 16-kilometre (10 mi) tunnel, emerging at Ardwick where the line will continue to its terminus at Manchester Piccadilly.

The route to the West Midlands will be the first stage of a line to Scotland, and passengers travelling to or from Scotland will be able to use through trains with a saving of 45 minutes from day one. It was recommended by a Parliamentary select committee on HS2 in November 2011 that a statutory clause should be in the bill that will guarantee HS2 being constructed beyond Birmingham so that the economic benefits are spread farther.

==== Approval ====
In November 2016 the plans were approved by the Government and the route was confirmed.

==== Possible South Yorkshire Hub ====
Changes were made to the eastern leg of the HS2 "Y" route through South Yorkshire, with Meadowhall on the outskirts of Sheffield being dropped from the scheme. The city of Sheffield will be served directly to its city centre at Sheffield Midland station, which will be accessed via classic track via Chesterfield to the south of the city, which will branch onto HS2 track to the south of Chesterfield. There are suggestions for a new 'South Yorkshire Hub' station to be built to replace Meadowhall which could be near Thurnscoe, Rotherham or Dearne Valley. The plans were backed by Sir David Higgins on 13 December 2016 and would see a new South Yorkshire Parkway Station.

The Transport Document, released in July 2016, stated:

As mentioned above, I also believe that HS2 should carry out a study to make recommendations to the Secretary of State on the potential for a parkway station on the M18/Eastern leg route which could serve the South Yorkshire area as a whole.

In January 2017, the government published eight possible sites for the hub across South Yorkshire and also said they would consider a 'South Yorkshire Hub'.

Sites being considered include: Bramley in Rotherham, South Yorkshire, Clayton in Doncaster, South Yorkshire, Fitzwilliam in Wakefield, Hemsworth in Wakefield, Hickleton in Doncaster, Hooton Roberts in Rotherham, Mexborough in Doncaster and Wales in Rotherham.

On 18 July 2017, MPs called for the government to build a parkway station on the planned HS2 route through South Yorkshire after the government confirmed HS2 would take the M18 Eastern Route. Transport Secretary, Chris Grayling confirmed in a letter to John Healey, the MP for Wentworth and Dearne, that a parkway station in South Yorkshire is still under consideration and that Grayling and the other local MPs were making the case for a station.

In September 2017, there were further calls for a station in South Yorkshire, while HS2 Ltd said any new station would require a consultation and that they were still assessing the eight sites proposed in January 2017. Any new station would have to be near existing railway lines in order to provide the best benefits of HS2.

In December 2017, the chairman of HS2 ordered a decision on the HS2 parkway station in South Yorkshire to made soon, and confirmed that only three options were being assessed. The decision will need to be made before a final decision in Parliament is made in 2019.

== Reappraisal and retrenchment ==
The route to Leeds was cancelled in November 2021, with the branch then expected to end at East Midlands Parkway railway station, south of Nottingham. In June 2022 the link to the WCML at Golbourne was cancelled.

On 4 October 2023, during the Conservative Party Conference in Manchester, the Prime Minister, Rishi Sunak announced the abandonment of Phase 2 to Manchester, leaving only the route between Old Oak Common (London) and Birmingham Curzon Street extant as funded elements of the project.

In October 2023, the UK's National Infrastructure Commission Chairman, Sir John Armitt, called for a pause on selling or de-safeguarding land designated for the now-scrapped HS2 routes, to allow reconsideration and explore alternatives. Sir John emphasised the need for a well-thought-through, integrated plan for the future. "I think it's a mistake", he told the BBC. "I think that the land should be kept for at least two or three years to give the opportunity for people to revisit that and look at what can be done within that space and find a more cost-effective solution, not write it off today".

== Alternative proposals ==
=== Upgrade existing lines ===
A Department for Transport-commissioned study into alternatives identified the following options:

- lengthen existing trains and platforms, cost £3.5 billion
- remodel infrastructure to increase service frequency, cost £13 billion
- increase capacity and reduce journey times by bypassing slow track sections, cost £24 billion

According to Network Rail, these options would cause massive disruption to passengers with weekend closures all year for between 8 and 29 years for limited improvement.

=== Great Central option ===
Kelvin Hopkins MP, together with some hauliers and supermarket groups, has drawn up plans to reopen the former Great Central Main Line as an alternative to HS2. A previous attempt to re-open the Great Central as an intermodal freight transport railway under the name Central Railway was made in about 1990. Much of the former Great Central railway alignment has been built on where it passes through towns and cities. Any reopening would require entirely new alignments around new developments; compulsory purchase and demolition of property or the boring of new tunnels. Crucially, the Great Central line would not serve Birmingham. It would not provide capacity release on the congested Coventry-Wolverhampton line, nor would it release platforms for improved local services at Birmingham New Street station.

=== HighSpeed UK (HSUK) ===
HighSpeed UK (HSUK) is an advocacy group which proposes an alternative route to HS2 which broadly incorporates the proposed HS3 scheme. Its recommended route would follow the M1 motorway corridor northwards out of London, heading up the eastern side of the Pennines towards Edinburgh and Glasgow, roughly following the route of the existing East Coast Mainline. The route would use a combination of newly constructed track and updated track on existing lines. Cities in the English Midlands and Northern England would be connected to this line via a series of spurs diverging west, with a branch serving Birmingham and another branch serving Manchester and Liverpool. The Manchester branch would be linked to the main HSUK line via a Y-shaped connection which would allow trains also to serve Sheffield and Leeds, covering much of the proposed HS3 route. The HSUK proposal is not officially approved or funded by government. The scheme received a parliamentary hearing in 2015.

=== Maglev ===
Faster journey times than those estimated for HS2 have been claimed by advocates of an alternative proposal to build a high-speed magnetic levitation train line, UK Ultraspeed. However, that scheme has not received any governmental support.
