= Farthings Wood =

Woodland in Buckinghamshire, UK

Farthings Wood is an ancient replanted woodland near Little Missenden in the English county of Buckinghamshire. The predominant tree species in the wood is Corsican pine, interspersed with beech, wild cherry, rowan, ash, silver birch, downy birch and sycamore. There are also Scots pine trees in the southern section of the wood, and hornbeam, oak and hawthorn around the boundaries of the wood. The shrub layer consists of a number of different species. The wood is home to two species of bats, namely the Common Pipistrelle and the Soprano Pipistrelle.

The route of the High Speed 2 railway passes underneath Farthings Wood. In 2015 plans were altered, extending the planned Chiltern tunnel north by 2.6 km such that the railway will pass underneath the wood rather than at surface level.
