= Stop HS2 =

Campaign against HS2 in UK

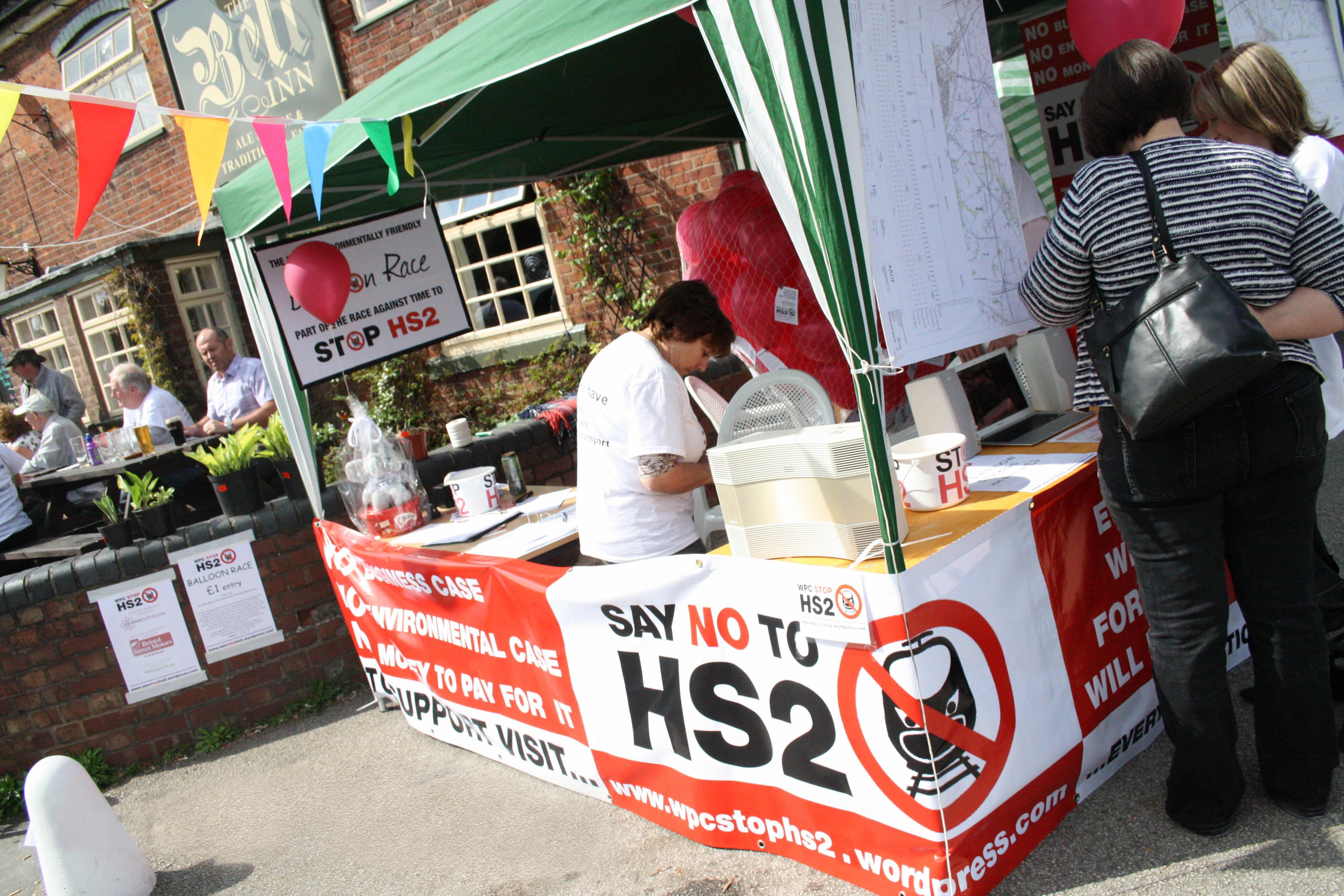
Stop HS2 at Whittington Big Green Fair, 2011

Stop HS2 is a campaign group which opposes the High Speed 2 (HS2) railway project in England. The group was set up in 2010 under the slogan "No business case. No environmental case. No money to pay for it." The following year it organised a conference and it has since challenged MPs, criticised HS2 plans and organised protests. In 2020, the group commented on the Oakervee report and supports illegal camps impeding construction in the Colne Valley Regional Park, Kenilworth and Wendover.

== Foundation ==
Stop HS2 was set up in 2010 with the aim of stopping High Speed 2 being built, campaigning on both national and local levels. According to the group, construction of the railway and its associated services will destroy woodland, affect local ecosystems and increase carbon emissions. Its slogan is "No business case. No environmental case. No money to pay for it." Stop HS2 has challenged the predicted speeds and capacities of HS2. The group tracks the evolving history of the HS2 project on its website. Other groups opposing HS2 include the HS2 Action Alliance, The Wildlife Trusts and the Woodland Trust.

The group has a chairperson, a treasurer and a campaign manager, relying on donations to pay them. In 2011, it made a fundraiser to pay its campaign manager Joe Rukin. Rukin lives in Kenilworth and condemned the "complete mismanagement of the project, the rampant cost escalation, the abandonment of all original timescales". Stop HS2 organised a national conference in 2011 to co-ordinate opposition to HS2. Every Member of Parliament was invited and speakers included transport expert Christian Wolmar and representatives from the Green Party, the RSPB, the UK Independence Party and The Wildlife Trusts.

== Campaigning ==
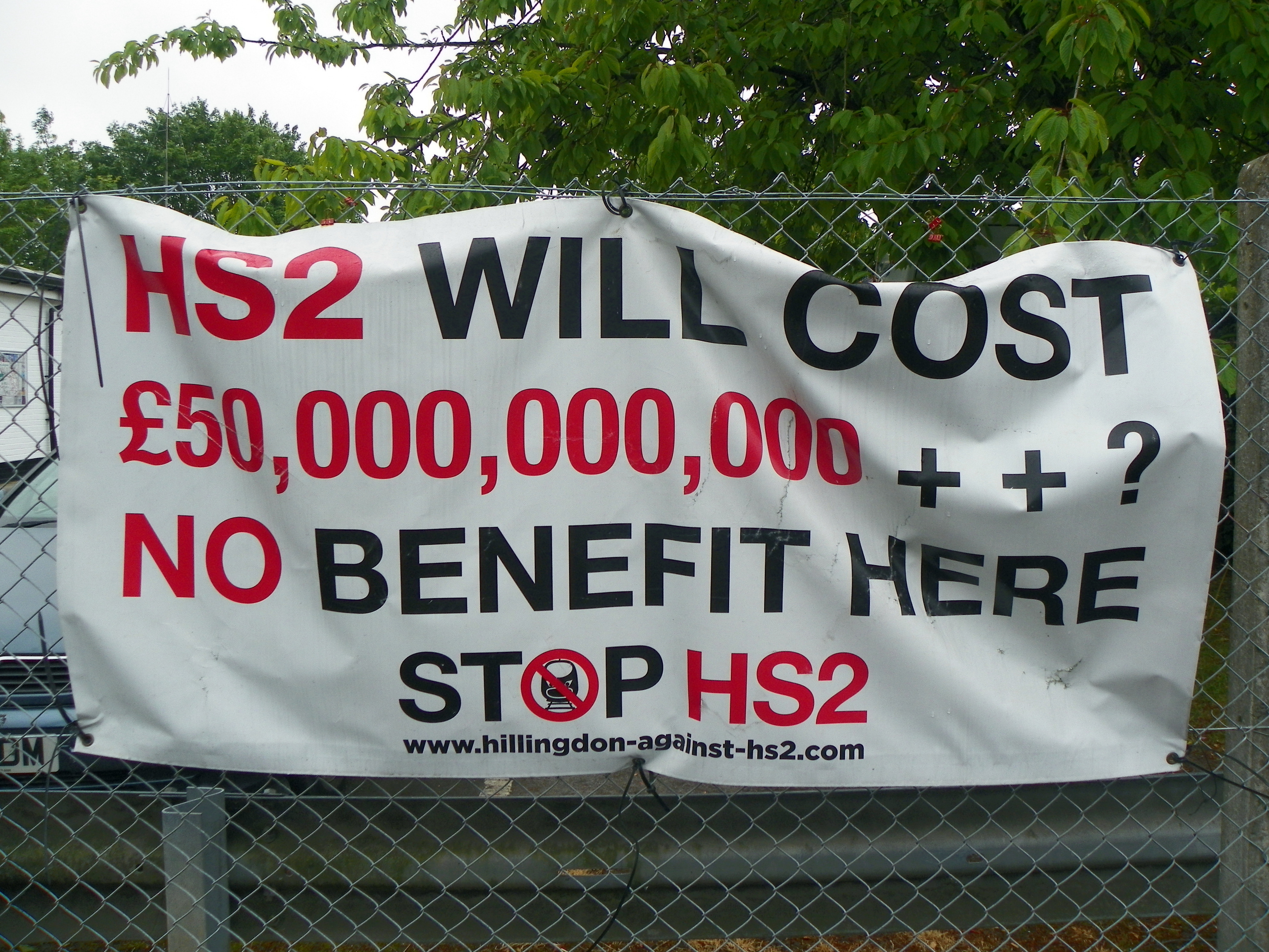
Protest banner in Harefield, 2015

Cheryl Gillan, MP for Chesham and Amersham, was challenged by Stop HS2 in 2012 for not following through on her threat to resign from her position as Secretary of State for Wales if HS2 was not cancelled. She remained in opposition to the HS2 plans and died in 2021.

In early 2018, Stop HS2 criticised plans for a viaduct in the Colne Valley Regional Park which would be 2.1 miles (3.4 km) long. The group voiced concerns about the Overhead Line Equipment (OLE) and the noise barriers. Stop HS2 protested outside the Conservative Party conference in summer 2018, shouting "terrible train disaster, read all about it!" and inflating a white elephant.

Stop HS2 organised a Stand for the Trees event in December 2019 with Extinction Rebellion and Save the Colne Valley Wildlife Protection Group which attracted around 1,300 people. They walked through the nature reserve, ending up at the Blackford Pumping Station.

After a government commissioned review of HS2 was published in 2020 with a dissenting view by its deputy chair Tony Berkley, the chairperson of Stop HS2 commented "The case for HS2 has always been poor, and is simply getting worse". According to her analysis, the project was first predicted to cost £33 billion, figures were then revised upwards and as of early 2020, the expected cost had risen to £88 billion. A leaked report in February 2020 then put the costs at £106 billion. Rukin described the decision to continue during the coronavirus pandemic as "bafflingly irrational".

In response to reports in February 2020 that China might be involved in HS2, Rukin stated this "should fill everyone with dread", citing concerns over corruption and safety in the Chinese railway network.

In June 2020, participants in Stop HS2 and Extinction Rebellion made a seven-day walk along the proposed railway line, starting at the site of Birmingham Curzon Street railway station and ending at Euston railway station in London. Stop HS2 supports protest camps in places such as Crackley Woods near Kenilworth and Wendover.

In March 2021, Stop HS2's request for a judicial review of the decision to issue "Notice to Proceed" for phase 1 of HS2 was refused by the High Court.

== See also ==
- List of opposition to High Speed 2
