= Anthony Gueterbock, 18th Baron Berkeley =

British aristocrat and life peer (born 1939)

The Right Honourable The Lord Berkeley OBE
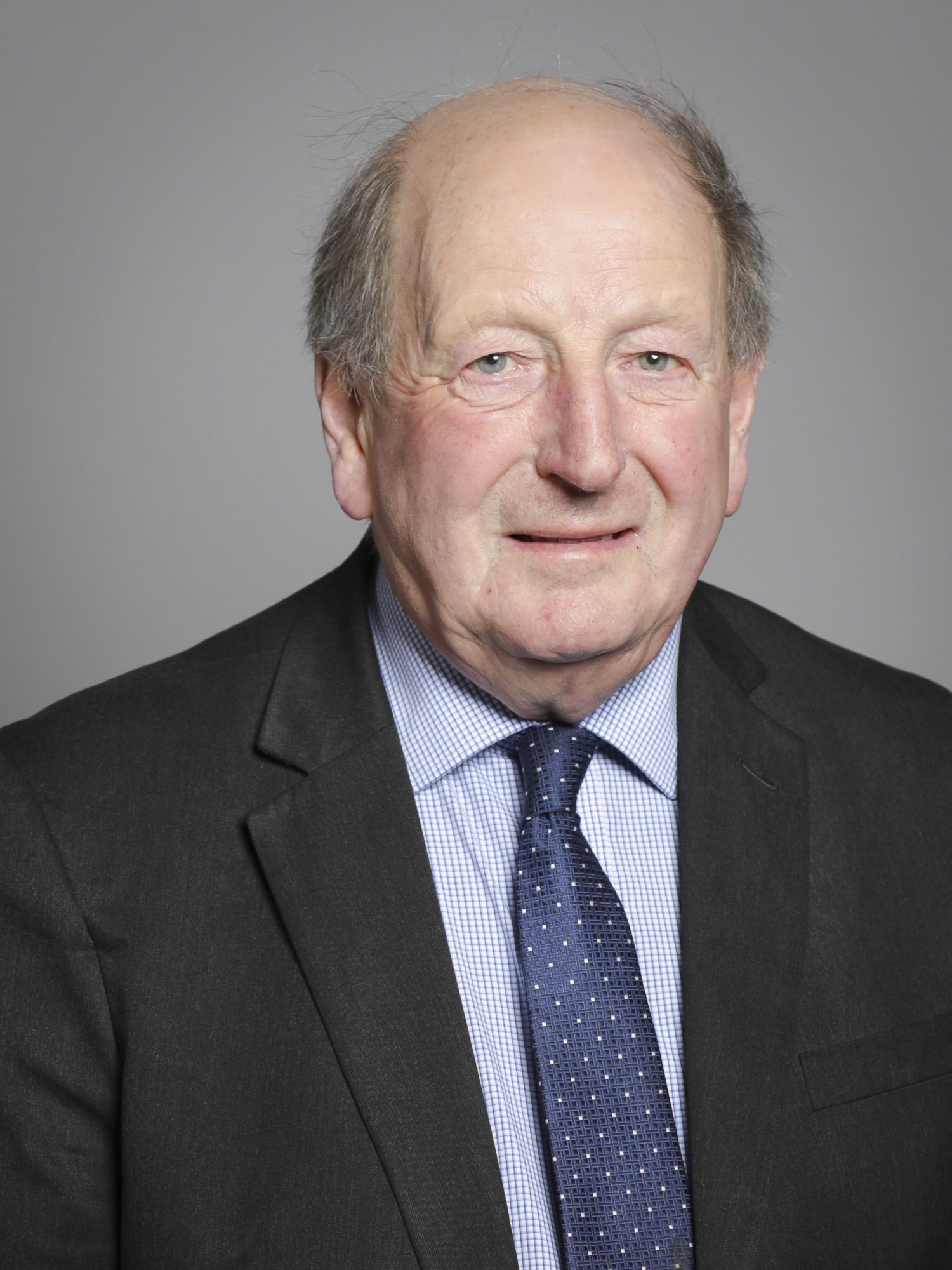
- Lord Berkeley in 2019

Member of the House of Lords
- Lord Temporal
- Hereditary peerage 17 October 1992 – 11 November 1999
- Preceded by: The 17th Baroness Berkeley
- Succeeded by: Seat abolished
- Incumbent
- Life peerage 18 April 2000

Personal details
- Born: 20 September 1939 (age 87) Sutton, Surrey, England
- Party: Labour
- Spouse: Marian Berkeley
- Relations: Earls of Berkeley
- Education: Eton College; Trinity College, Cambridge
- Occupation: Civil engineer; parliamentarian
- Website: www.parliament.uk

Anthony Fitzhardinge Gueterbock, 18th Baron Berkeley, Baron Gueterbock, OBE (born 20 September 1939), otherwise known as Tony Berkeley, is a British aristocrat and Labour parliamentarian.

Holder of an ancient English hereditary peerage title created in 1421, Lord Berkeley sits in the House of Lords by virtue of being created a life peer in 2000.

== Background ==
Lord Berkeley is son of the Hon. Cynthia Ella Foley (1909–1991) and Brigadier Ernest Adolphus Leopold Gueterbock (1897-1984), of The Plough, Terrick, Buckinghamshire, late of the Royal Engineers. His mother was the younger of the two daughters of Eva, 16th Baroness Berkeley; her elder sister Mary succeeded as 17th Baroness Berkeley, and died unmarried in 1992. The Güterbocks, of Jewish descent, originally hailed from Prussia in former East Germany, before moving to Brandenburg to establish a Berlin bank, Güterbock Moritz & Co.

Lord Berkeley's paternal grandfather, Alfred Güterbock (1845–1929), of Bowdon, Cheshire, emigrated to England, and with his wife Anna (née Prüßmann; 1858–1928), had three other sons, including Sir Paul Gueterbock (1886–1954).

== Life ==
Gueterbock was educated at Eton College, before going up to Trinity College, Cambridge, where he graduated as a BA (proceeding MA). He then took a career in civil engineering with George Wimpey as an engineer until 1985. For the next ten years he worked as an engineer for Eurotunnel 1985–95.

Gueterbock inherited his maternal ancestors' ancient title of Baron Berkeley in 1992, succeeding his aunt Mary Foley-Berkeley, 17th Baroness Berkeley. Lord Berkeley additionally became Baron Gueterbock, of Cranford in the London Borough of Hillingdon, in 2000, but remains known in Parliament as Lord Berkeley. His life peerage enables him to continue sitting as a Labour peer in the House of Lords, following the ejection of the vast majority of hereditary peers in 1999; he was not elected a hereditary representative peer.

Since his introduction to the House of Lords in 1992, Lord Berkeley has served as Opposition Spokesman for Transport 1996–97 and Opposition Whip 1996–97. He is the Secretary of the All-Party Parliamentary Cycling Group and has tabled many questions in the House of Lords on Transport policy, including about bicycles on trains. Lord Berkeley has also tabled questions about police conduct with regards to civil liberties. Lord Berkeley queried restrictions on peers bringing guests into the House of Lords during President Barack Obama's visit to London.

Lord Berkeley served as Chairman of the Rail Freight Group, the industry representative body for the rail freight sector, and is elected as a board member of the European Rail Freight Association. He is also a Trustee of Plymouth Marine Laboratory, President of the UK Maritime Pilots' Association.

Appointed an OBE in 1989 "for services to the construction industry", Lord and Lady Berkeley divide their time between homes in London and Cornwall.

In 2019 Lord Berkeley became Vice-Chairman of the All-Party Parliamentary Group on Whistleblowing. He was named as Co-Chairman when the group reconstituted in 2020. All current and former members of the group have been subject to criticism from some campaigners on whistleblowing law reform, questioning their transparency and accountability, following Sir Norman Lamb's resignation from the group.

=== Arms ===
Coat of arms of Anthony Gueterbock, 18th Baron Berkeley

Coronet
That of a Baron
Crest
Out of ducal coronet Or a Demi Man Proper affronté in Armour Or his dexter hand holding a Halberd also Proper
Helm
That of a Peer
Escutcheon
Quarterly, 1. Güterbock patrilineal arms; 2. Argent a Fesse engrailed between three Cinquefoils Sable all within a Bordure of the Last (Foley); 3. Azure a Snake nowed Or between three sinister Gauntlets open Argent (Milman); 4. Gules a Chevron between ten Crosses Pattées six in chief and four in base Argent (Berkeley)
Supporters
On either side a Lion Argent the sinister collared chained and ducally crowned Or
Motto
Dieu avec Nous
(Fr. God with Us)
Other elements
Suspended below the Shield by its ribbon the insignia of an Officer of the Order of the British Empire
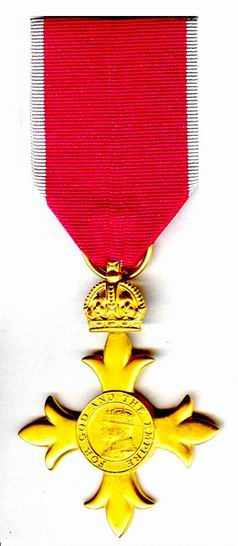

== See also ==
- House of Lords

Peerage of England
| Preceded by Mary Foley-Berkeley | Baron Berkeley; 1992–present | Incumbent |
