= National Aviation Investigation Agency and Railway Accidents and Transportation Safety =

- Εθνικός Οργανισμός Διερεύνησης Αεροπορικών και Σιδηροδρομικών Ατυχημάτων και Ασφάλειας Μεταφορών

Agency overview
- Formed: 21 January 2023; 3 years ago
- Preceding agencies: Air Accident Investigation and Aviation Safety Board; Commission for the Investigation of Railway Accidents and Incidents
- Jurisdiction: Government of Greece
- Headquarters: Nea Filadelfeia, Athens
- Minister responsible: Christos Staikouras
- Agency executives: Vacant, President; Chistos Papadimitriou, President of railway section / deputy President; Konstantinos Kapetanidis, Head of the Accident Investigation Unit
- Parent agency: Ministry of Infrastructure and Transport
- Website: www.harsia.gr/index.php/en/home-basic/

The National Aviation Investigation Agency and Railway Accidents and Transportation Safety (HARSIA, Greek: Εθνικός Οργανισμός Διερεύνησης Αεροπορικών και Σιδηροδρομικών Ατυχημάτων και Ασφάλειας Μεταφορών - EΟΔΑΣΑΑΜ) is the competent body for the investigation of air and rail accidents in Greece. It is an autonomous public service of the Ministry of Infrastructure and Transport, supervised by the Minister himself. It was created by Law 5014 of January 2023, by merging the Aircraft Accident Investigation and Aviation Safety Board and the Commission for the Investigation of Railway Accidents and Incidents.

It became operational in February 2024 and its first case was the Tempi railway accident.

== Previous Boards ==
=== Aircraft Accident Investigation and Aviation Safety Board ===
The Board was established in 2001 by Law 2912/01 in order for Greece to comply with EU Directive 94/56 "Establishment of the Basic Principles Governing the Investigation of Civil Aviation Accidents and Incidents". The Board was supervised by the Ministry of Infrastructure and Transport, but its members enjoyed administrative and financial autonomy. From 2001 to 2011, the chairman of the commission was Akrivos Tsolakis (Greek: Ακριβός Τσολάκης), the founder of the aviation safety sector in Greece.

The Seal of The Hellenic Air Accident Investigation and Aviation Safety Board (AAIASB)

During its years of operation, the body had investigated around 200 air accidents. The most famous of these were

- Chinook crash in Greece (2004)
- Helios Airways Flight 522 (2005)
- Meridian Flight 3032 (2022)

=== Commission for the Investigation of Railway Accidents and Incidents ===
According to the European Union's Directive 2016/798 on railway safety, each member state must establish a permanent committee to investigate rail accidents and incidents. In Greece, the directive was incorporated into national law in October 2019 with a law (4632/2019) for the establishment of the "Railway Accident and Incident Investigation Committee" (EDISAS). In the end, the Commission was never created and never functioned, as the government repealed Law 4632 and replaced it with Law. 5014/2023, which created the HARSIA.

== See also ==
- List of aviation accidents and incidents in Greece
- List of rail accidents in Greece
- Hellenic Bureau for Marine Casualties Investigation
