= HS2 automated people mover =

Planned transit system in Solihull, England

Overview
- Locale: Solihull, United Kingdom
- Transit type: Automated guideway transit/people mover
- Number of stations: 4

Operation
- Character: Elevated viaduct
- Number of vehicles: 4
- Headway: 3 minutes

Technical
- System length: 2.2 km (1.4 miles)
- No. of tracks: Twin and single track sections

The HS2 automated people mover is a planned automated people mover (APM) in Solihull, England being built in conjunction with the High Speed 2 project in order to improve connections between HS2's upcoming Interchange station, Birmingham Airport, and other rail and community infrastructure.

== History ==
Renderings of the people mover were revealed in July 2019 and Schedule 17 approval was granted in 2020. Revised plans for the people mover were submitted to Solihull Council on 3 February 2022, with the altered alignment of an approximately 815 m (2,674 ft) section, developed in conjunction with the Urban Growth Company (of Solihull Council). This would allow for possible future commercial developments, a proposed redevelopment of Birmingham International railway station, as well as including additional planting and artwork. These plans were approved on 29 April 2022.

Procurement for the system started in 2023. Two contracts, for the design, supply, operation and maintenance (for 25 years) of the APM system, worth £269 million, were originally expected to be awarded in 2026. Poma and Doppelmayr were shortlisted and invited to submit tenders in February 2025. In June 2026, a separate contract for its construction, worth £184.8 million, was tendered which will run from April 2029 to July 2033. The infrastructure contractor will also serve as the principal contractor, managing the systems contractor and co-ordinating with other HS2 contractors.

== Route ==
The route is elevated throughout on a viaduct and is 2.2 km (1.4 miles) long. The eastern terminus of the proposed route is Birmingham Interchange, a station on High Speed 2. The line will run west to Birmingham Airport with intermediate stops at the National Exhibition Centre (NEC) and Birmingham International railway station, a stop on the West Coast Main Line.

The station at Birmingham Interchange will face onto the West Plaza of the station. The NEC station will face Pendigo Way, south of the main entrance to the NEC exhibitions halls. At Birmingham International railway station, it will be south-west of the station, in the long stay station car park, linked to the railway station by a pedestrian bridge. At the terminus of Birmingham Airport, the station will sit adjacent to the arrivals hall, at its southern end. The Interchange station stop is on ground level and the three other stops and maintenance facility are on the viaduct.

== Specification ==
The viaduct will be made of weathering steel, supported on reinforced concrete columns 6–14 m (20–46 ft) high, and will cross the M42 motorway, the West Coast Main Line, Pendigo lake (an artificial lake near the National Exhibition Centre), roads leading to the airport and other local roads. As the system will be automated, a walkway will be provided along the length of the route for emergency and trackside access.

A maintenance facility will be built close to the main viaduct next to the M42 motorway.

Although sections are double tracked at intermediate stops and to allow passing, significant sections of the route are single tracked in a pinched loop configuration. Structures are being built to allow for both self-propelled and cable-pulled people movers to provide future flexibility in operation and for tenders. The Interchange and Birmingham Airport stations will each have one platform face, while the NEC and Birmingham International stations will have two platform faces.

Services are expected to use approximately 20 m (66 ft) vehicles, running every three minutes and will take six minutes end-to-end between Birmingham Airport and Interchange station, with a throughput capacity of 2,100 passengers per hour in each direction (with future provision up to 3,900). To support these frequencies, a minimum of four vehicles will be in operation at any one time.

Platforms, which will be 36–40 m (118–131 ft) long, will be covered by insulated steel canopies, which will incorporate lighting, and will have platform screen doors. Most stops will include a number of lifts and escalators owing to the elevated nature of the people mover.

== Design ==
Due to its sensitive surroundings, the visual depth of the viaduct was considered and reduced such as through reducing the depth of the walkway, placing its beams alongside the track. The initial proposal for a concrete deck was dropped in favour of support from the steelwork itself with grating, saving more than approximately 10,000 m^{3} (350,000 cu ft) of concrete. The viaduct will have 40 m (130 ft) spans, increasing to 70 m (230 ft) over the M42 motorway and West Coast Main Line.

All stops will incorporate common design elements through the route such as through lifts, escalators, and platform design. They will also incorporate a different coloured structural ribbon at each stop, wrapping through from the entrances to the platforms, to aid way-finding and for weather protection.
