= Birmingham International railway station =

Railway station in the West Midlands, England

Birmingham International
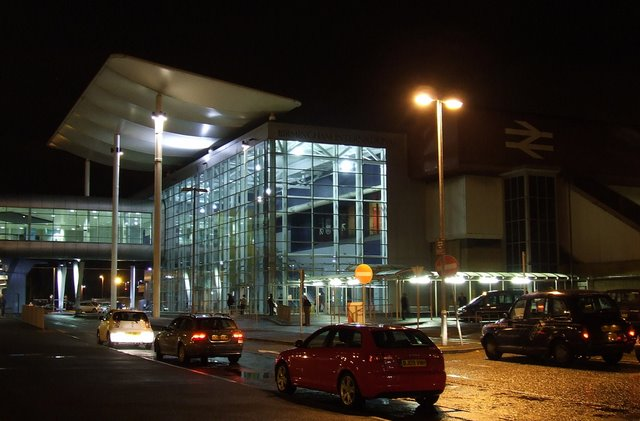
- Entrance to the station

General information
- Location: Birmingham Airport, Bickenhill, Metropolitan Borough of Solihull, England
- Coordinates: 52.451°N 1.725°W
- Grid reference: SP187837
- Manager: Avanti West Coast
- Transit authority: Transport for West Midlands
- Platforms: 5

Other information
- Station code: BHI
- Fare zone: 5
- Classification: DfT category B

History
- Original company: British Rail

Key dates
- 26 January 1976: Opened

Passengers
- 2021/22: ▲2.411 million
- Interchange: ▲92,898
- 2022/23: ▲4.185 million
- Interchange: ▲258,069
- 2023/24: ▲4.680 million
- Interchange: ▼213,340
- 2024/25: ▲5.003 million
- Interchange: ▲276,067
- 2025/26: ▲5.410 million
- Interchange: ▲355,516
Location
Notes
- Passenger statistics from the Office of Rail and Road

Birmingham International is a railway station in the Metropolitan Borough of Solihull, West Midlands, England; it lies just east of Birmingham. It serves Birmingham Airport, the National Exhibition Centre, the Resorts World Arena and Resorts World Birmingham. It lies on the Rugby–Birmingham–Stafford line, 9 miles (14.5 km) east of Birmingham New Street.

== History ==
The station was designed by the architect Ray Moorcroft and opened on 26 January 1976; it has regular train services to many parts of the country. A large space under the overbridge next to the southbound platforms suggests an allowance for future station expansion.

In 2016, it was proposed to rename it to Birmingham Airport & NEC, due to the airport's name change and its presence near to the National Exhibition Centre. Despite claims that the station was named after the adjacent airport, it was eight years after the station's opening before the airport was rebranded Birmingham International in 1984.

== Services ==
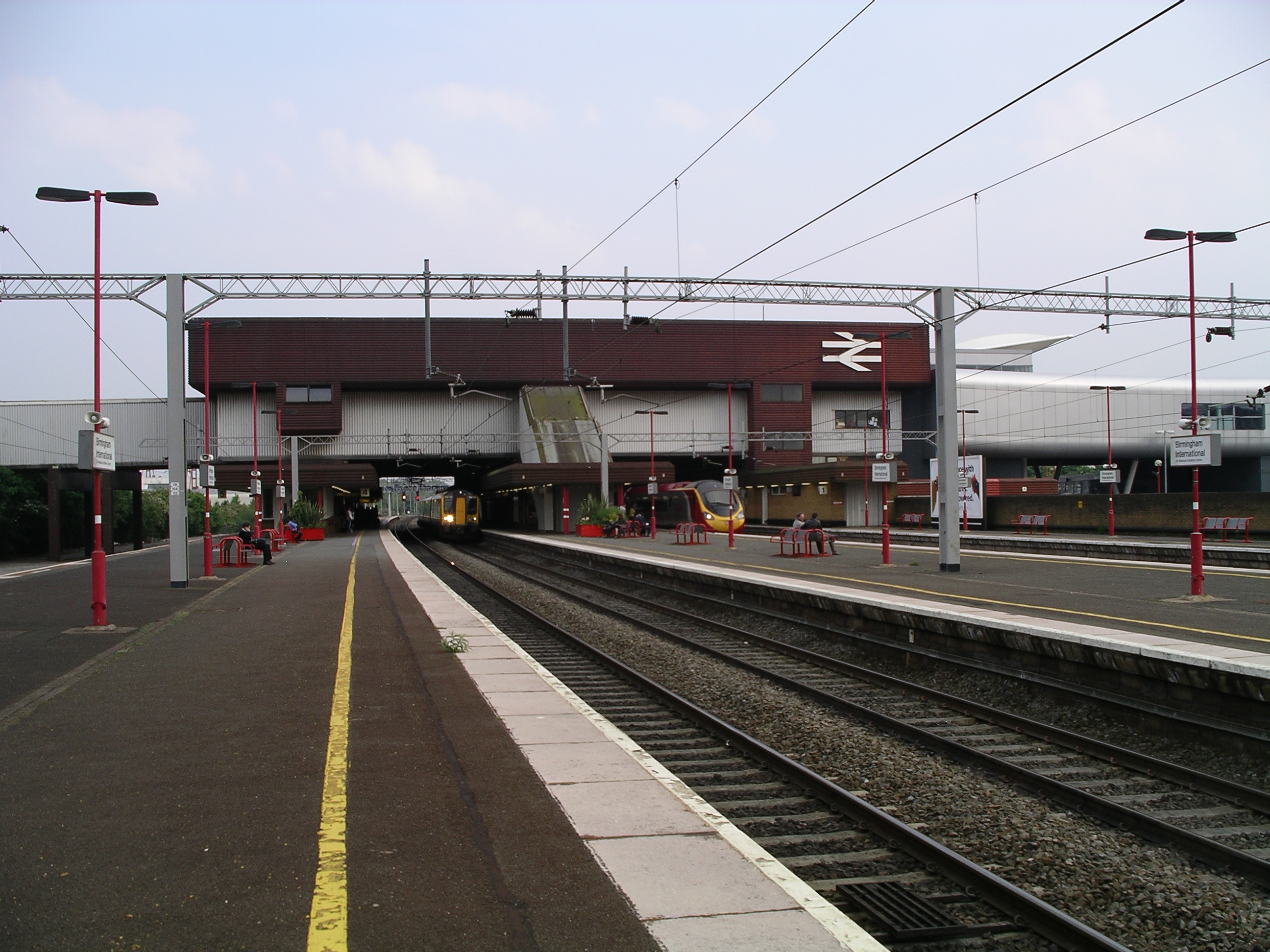
The station at platform level

It has five platforms, consisting of two islands and one side platform numbered 1–5 from south to north.

The station is served by five train operating companies, with the following basic Monday to Saturday off-peak service in trains per hour/day.

Avanti West Coast:

- 2 tph to London Euston, via Coventry
- 2 tph to Birmingham New Street
- 1 tp2h to Glasgow Central, via Wolverhampton and Preston
- 1 tp2h to Edinburgh Waverley, via Wolverhampton and Preston

CrossCountry:

- 1 tph to Manchester Piccadilly, via Stoke-on-Trent and Macclesfield
- 1 tph to Bournemouth, via Coventry and Reading.

Transport for Wales:

- 1 tph to Shrewsbury, of which:
  - 1 tp2h continues to Aberystwyth and Pwllheli, after dividing at Machynlleth
  - 1 tp2h continues to Holyhead, via Wrexham General and Chester.

West Midlands Trains:

London Northwestern Railway

- 2 tph to London Euston, via Northampton
- 2 tph to Birmingham New Street

West Midlands Railway

- 2 tph to Rugeley Trent Valley, via Birmingham New Street and Walsall

Caledonian Sleeper

- 1 tpd to London Euston
- 1 tpd to Aberdeen/Inverness/Fort William (departs as a single train and divides at Edinburgh Waverley into three portions for each destination).

Preceding station	National Rail	Following station
Birmingham New Street	Avanti West Coast London – Birmingham – North West & Scotland	Coventry
Birmingham New Street	CrossCountry South West to Manchester	Coventry
Birmingham New Street Terminus	London Northwestern Railway London–Birmingham	Hampton-in-Arden towards London Euston
Birmingham New Street	Transport for Wales Birmingham International-Chester/Holyhead	Terminus
Birmingham New Street	Transport for Wales Birmingham International - Aberystwyth/Pwllheli	Terminus
Marston Green	West Midlands Railway Birmingham International – Walsall – Rugeley Trent Valley	Terminus
Crewe	Caledonian Sleeper Highland Sleeper	London Euston
Preceding station	Air-Rail Link	Following station
Terminus	Air-Rail Link (formerly Maglev)	Birmingham Airport

== Connection to Birmingham Airport ==
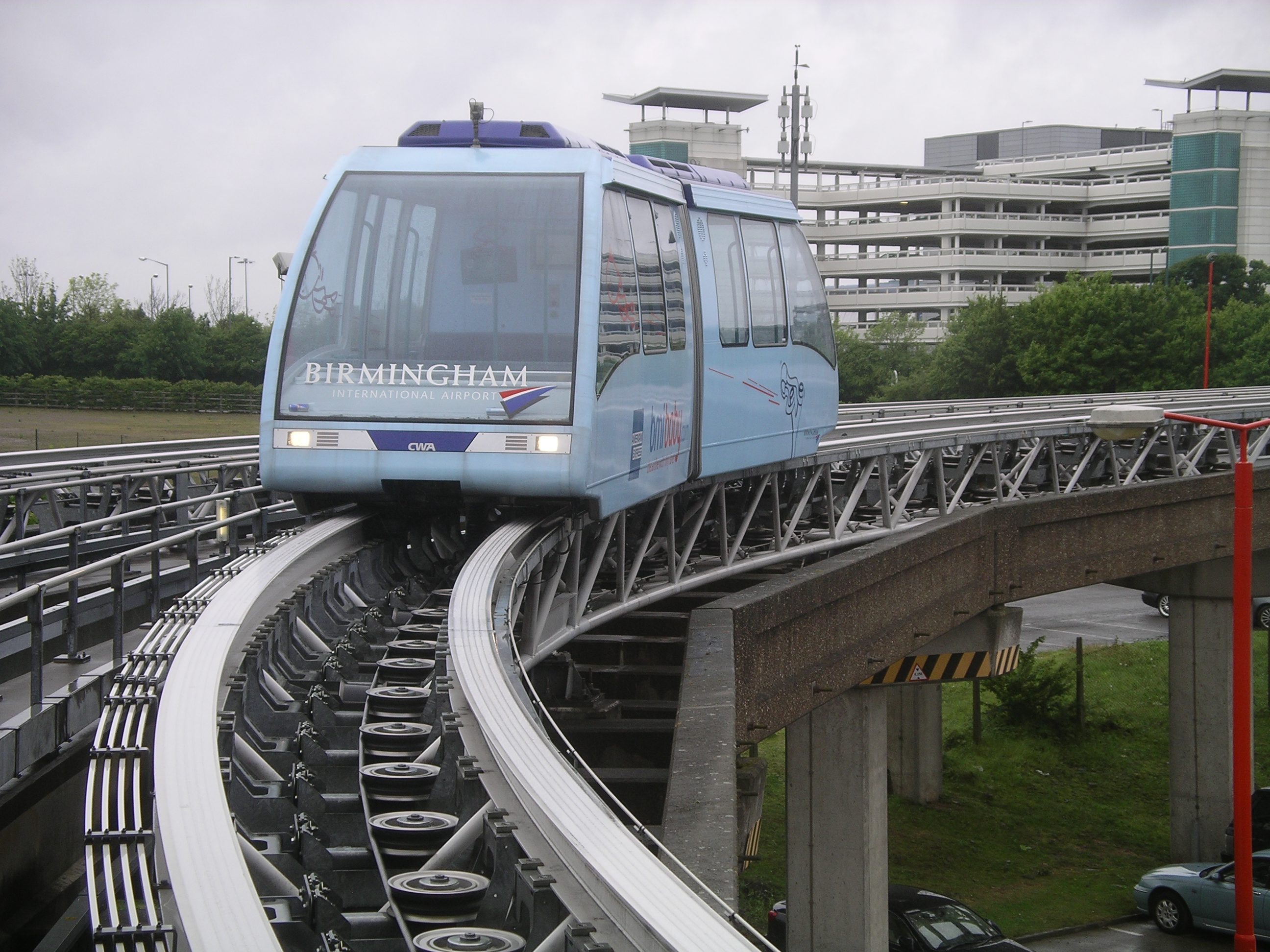
AirRail Link people mover system showing the track and pulley system

A maglev service ran from the airport terminal to the station from 1984 until 1995. The train "flew" at an altitude of 15 mm over a track 620 m in length. It operated for nearly 11 years, but was scrapped because spare parts for the system were no longer available. It was temporarily replaced by a bus.

The chosen replacement system, the Doppelmayr Cable Car Cable Liner shuttle, was announced in late 2000 and construction started in 2001. The Interchange was opened in March 2003. The system was known originally as SkyRail but, in 2004, it was renamed AirRail Link.

The airport can also be reached via a dedicated fast bus service from Coleshill Parkway station, on the Birmingham to Peterborough Line.

== Connection to the National Exhibition Centre ==
Undercover walkways, escalators and travelators connect the NEC buildings to the station and to the Air-Rail Link which, in turn, connects to Birmingham Airport.

== Birmingham Interchange ==
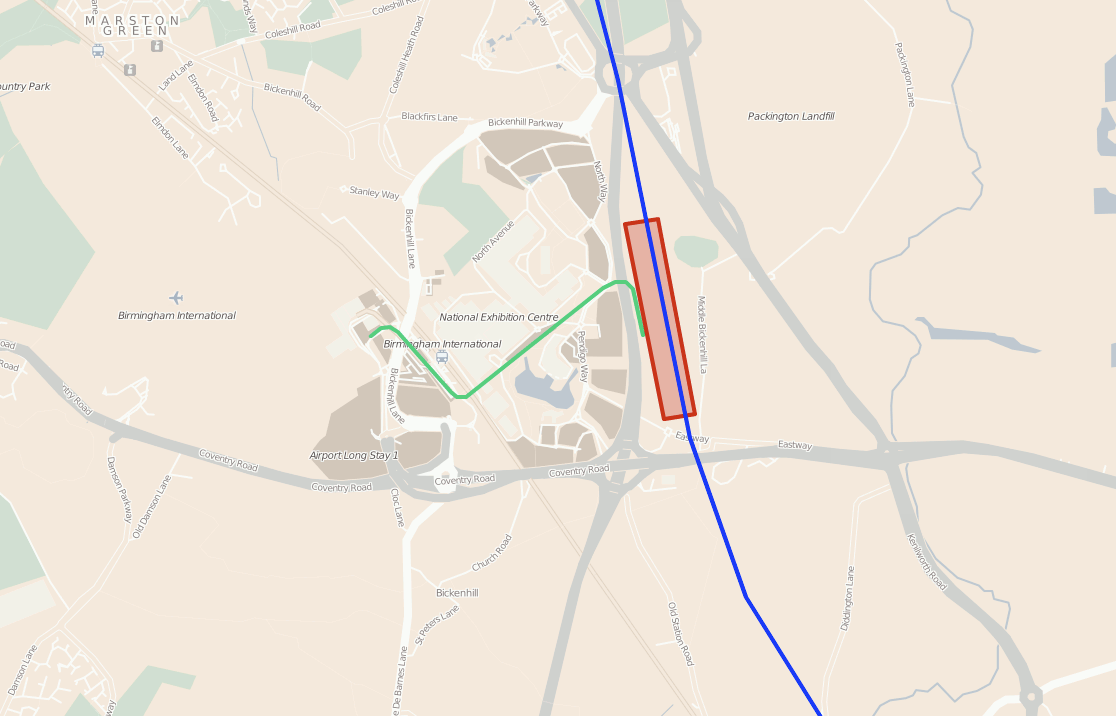
The proposed Birmingham Interchange

A new Birmingham Interchange station is to be built on the other side of the M42 motorway on the High Speed 2 rail line. The new interchange will be connected to the station by an automated people mover, as well as to the airport and National Exhibition Centre; the AirRail Link people mover already operates between Birmingham International station and the airport.
