= List of aviation accidents and incidents in Greece =

This is a list of aviation accidents and incidents that have occurred in Greece.

== Civilian ==
=== 1940s ===
- October 26, 1947: Douglas DC-4 on way from Istanbul to Athens crashes in Hymettus. 44 people died.
- December 21, 1948: Douglas C-47 of Czech Airlines crashes in Kalamata with a death toll of 24.
- June 6, 1949: Douglas C-47 of the now-defunct National Greek Airlines crashes in Athens. 22 people die.

=== 1950s ===
- October 29, 1959: DC3 of Olympic Airways crashes near Tanagra. 18 people are killed.

=== 1960s ===
- October 12, 1967: De Havilland DH.106 Comet of British European Airways crashes off Rhodes, killing 66 people on board.
- December 8, 1969: Douglas DC-6 of Olympic Airways from Chania to Athens crashes in Keratea. 90 people are killed.

=== 1970s ===
- July 19, 1972: BAC One-Eleven 501EX of British Caledonian overruns the runway of Kerkyra (Corfu) Airport during takeoff and stops in a lagoon. One elderly passenger dies subsequently from a heart attack.
- October 21, 1972: NAMC YS-11 of Olympic Airways crashes in Athens. 37 people are killed.
- September 8, 1974: TWA Flight 841 crashes into the Ionian Sea. All 79 passengers and 9 crew members were killed.
- November 23, 1976: NAMC YS-11 of Olympic Airways from Athens to Kozani crashes under fog into a mountain near Sarantaporo. Fatalities: 50.
- October 7, 1979: A Douglas DC-8 Swissair Flight 316 lands at Athens Ellinikon International Airport, overshoots the runway, and kills fourteen passengers.

=== 1980s ===
- April 2, 1986: TWA Flight 840 is bombed en route to Athens, ejecting 4 on board. The plane landed safely.
- August 3, 1989: Short 330 of Olympic Airways from Thessaloniki to Samos crashes in the Kerketeus range of mountains. All 34 people on board are killed.

=== 1990s ===
- March 24, 1992: A Boeing 707-321C operated by Golden Star Air Cargo crashes into Mount Hymettus on approach to Athens-Ellinikon International Airport. All 7 people on board are killed.
- December 17, 1997: A Yakovlev Yak-42 operating Aerosvit Airlines flight 241 crashes into the Pierian mountains in Central Macedonia. 70 people are killed.

=== 2000s ===
- August 14, 2005: Helios Airways Flight 522 crashes in Grammatiko, killing all 121 people on board. This is the deadliest aviation accident in the history of Greece.
- October 3, 2006: Turkish Airlines Flight 1476 is hijacked in Greek airspace.

=== 2020s ===
- July 16, 2022: Meridian Flight 3032, an Antonov An-12BK carrying munitions from Serbia to Bangladesh, crashes near Kavala, killing all eight people on board.
- August 2, 2026: Two firefighting helicopters collided in mid-air while fighting a wildfire west of Athens, Greece. One helicopter crashed, killing both crew members, while the other made an emergency landing.
- August 17, 2026: A young English couple, Alexander Cromie and Marie Ebert, who were in Greece on their honeymoon, and the Greek pilot died in a helicopter accident. The helicopter they were flying in crashed on the Greek island of Sifnos.
- September 5, 2026: a McDonnell F-4E Phantom II belonging to the Hellenic Air Force crashed at Tanagra Air Base shortly after takeoff during an air show (“Athens Flying Week”). Both pilots died.

== Military ==
=== 1970s ===
- January 12, 1970: Douglas C-47 of the Hellenic Air Force crashes in Vilia, resulting in the death of 23 people.
- September 6, 1973: Two Mirage V's of the Belgian Air Force crash into the Lefka Ori mountains within one minute of each other, killing their pilots.
- February 9, 1975: Transall C-160 of the Luftwaffe crashes in Chania, killing 40 people.

=== 1990s ===
- February 5, 1991: The worst accident in the history of the Hellenic Air Force. Lockheed C-130H Hercules 748 crashes into Mount Othrys, killing 63.
- June 18, 1992: Greek Mirage F-1 crashes near Agios Efstratios while intercepting Turkish F-16s, killing pilot Lieutenant Nikolaos Sialmas.
- August 31, 1995: Antonov AN-26 of Force Aérienne du Mali crashes 2 nmi north of Makedonia International Airport, Thessaloniki. 6 people die.
- December 20, 1997: Lockheed Hercules C-130 of the Hellenic Air Force crashes into Pastra Mountain near Tanagra, killing 5.

=== 2000s ===
- September 11, 2004: Helicopter carrying Patriarch Peter VII of Alexandria and 16 others crashes into the Aegean Sea; none survived.
- May 23, 2006: A Greek and a Turkish F-16 collide in midair near Karpathos, killing Greek Captain Kostas Iliakis.
- December 5, 2007: Greek Bell UH-1 Iroquois crashes into Evia during a training mission. 4 crew members are killed.

=== 2010s ===
- February 26, 2010: Hellenic Army Agusta Bell AB212 crashes in Lamia during a training mission, killing 2 crew members.
- January 26, 2015: Greek F-16 crashes during a NATO training exercise at Los Llanos Air Base in Albacete, Spain, killing 11 (2 Greek pilots, 9 French military personnel). 21 others were injured.
- August 30, 2018: Greek Canadair CL-215 crashes in Zakynthos during firefighting efforts; crew survives.

=== 2020s ===
- January 30, 2023: Lockheed C-130J Super Hercules of the US Air Force crashes during a training mission in northern Greece. No fatalities were reported.
- On 30 January 2023, a Greek Air Force F-4E Phantom II crashed into the Ionian Sea. The aircraft was conducting a training exercise when it crashed 46 km south of the Andravida Air Base. The pilot and co-pilot were killed in the crash.
- August 17, 2026: A young English couple, Alexander Cromie and Marie Ebert, who were in Greece on their honeymoon, and the Greek pilot died in a helicopter accident. The helicopter they were flying in crashed on the Greek island of Sifnos.
- September 5, 2026: A McDonnell Douglas F-4 Phantom II of the 338th Fighter-Bomber Squadron crashed into a cliff while attempting a low flyby maneuver above the southernmost runway at Tanagra Air Base during the annual Athens Flying Week air show. A fire started abruptly; fire and rescue vehicles were dispatched immediately to the site of the impact. After successfully extinguishing the blaze both pilots were found deceased by search and rescue teams.

== See also ==
- List of accidents and incidents involving commercial aircraft
