= 2026 Greece wildfires =

- Date: Summer 2026

Statistics
- Status: Ongoing wildfire

Impacts
- Deaths: 8 (since June 2026)
- Evacuated: Thousands

Ignition
- Cause: Multiple causes
- Motive: Under investigation

Map
- Perimeters of 2026 Greece wildfire (map data)

Since July 2026, there have been multiple wildfires in Greece, resulting in several casualties and damage to properties.

== Background ==
The wildfires occurred during the 2026 European heatwaves. On 5 July, there were dozens of wildfires ongoing across Greece.

== Attica ==
On the evening of 31 July, a wildfire broke out in the Aigaleo region, at the Poíkilo mountain. While the fire did not last for a long time, it led to the evacuation of the area due to its proximity to industrial zones. The Dafni psychiatric hospital was also nearly evacuated, although the fire changed direction, resulting in the evacuation being cancelled.

On 2 August, two people were killed when two firefighting helicopters crashed near Athens. This happened amid wildfires in places such as Porto Germeno, Psatha, Fokida, Megara and Kefalonia.

On 16 August, two wildfires broke out in Salamis Island, killing two people.

== Crete ==
On 30 July 2026, thousands of people were evacuated in Crete due to wildfires. The fires destroyed large areas of farmland, olive groves and residential areas.

Three firefighters were reported killed.

== Paros ==
Wildfires were reported in Paros.

== Thessaloniki ==
On 30 June 2026, a wildfire broke out near the Liti area of Thessaloniki, killing two people and forcing evacuations.

On 4 July 2026, a wildfire broke out in the suburb of Anthoupoli and forced evacuations across three Thessaloniki suburbs. The wildfire damaged factories in the Filothei area, and forced the evacuation of a hospital named Agios Panteleimonas. The wildfire was extinguished on the morning of 5 July.

== See also ==
- 2018 Greece wildfires
- 2021 Greece wildfires
- 2023 Greece wildfires
