= Birmingham Interchange =

Future railway station in England

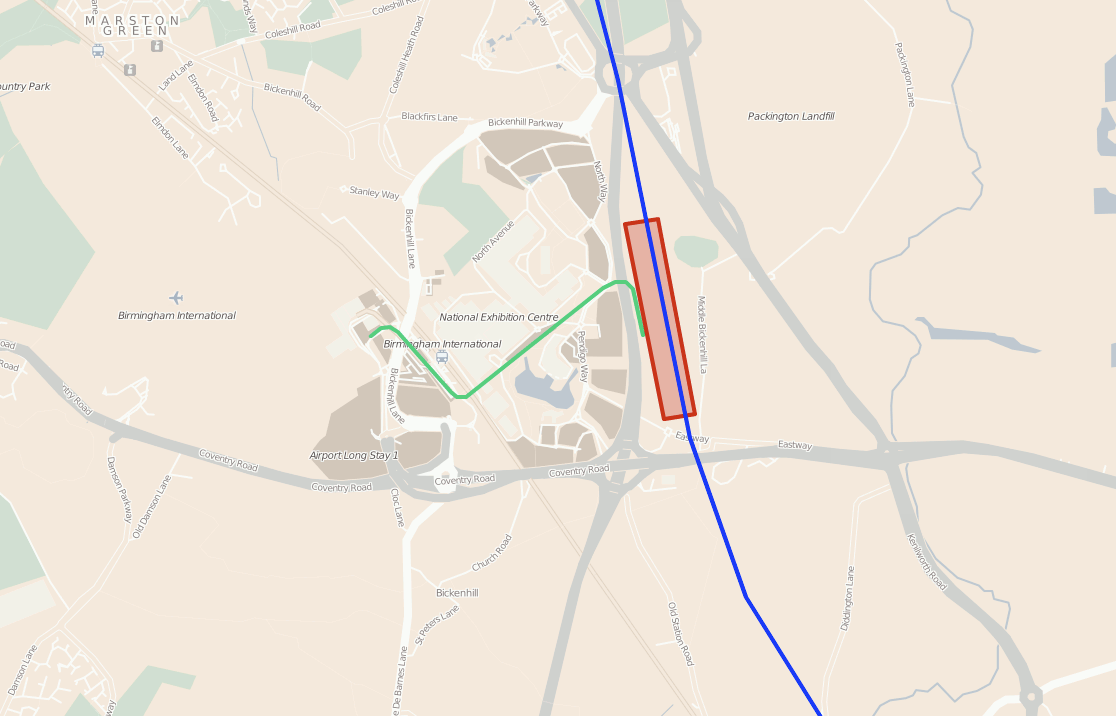
- Planned location

General information
- Location: Bickenhill, Solihull; England
- Coordinates: 52.45243°N 1.70709°W
- Grid reference: SP199839
- Platforms: 4 (2 island platforms)
- Tracks: 6

History
- Opening: 2027–2028 (planned)
Location

Birmingham Interchange is a planned High Speed 2 (HS2) railway station in Solihull. Construction is expected to finish in 2027.

Unlike the city centre based Birmingham Curzon Street railway station, this will be a parkway station, serving the east side of Birmingham and surrounding urban areas.

== History ==
The station was designed by Arup, with support from Churchman Thornhill Finch, achieving BREEAM ‘Outstanding’ certification, the first railway station in the world to do so, with measures to maximise daylight, LED lighting, reusing rainwater from its roof, and air source heat pumps. In June 2021, HS2 invited companies to bid for a £370 million contract to build the station.

Skanska, Unity (a joint venture with Sir Robert McAlpine and VolkerFitzpatrick, with support from WSP) and Laing O’Rourke were shortlisted. Laing O’Rourke was subsequently awarded the contract in July 2022 for its detailed design. As of 2025, initial works are ongoing, including the building of a road bridge over the station, and main construction will commence in early 2026.

The station will have four platforms, made of two 415 m-long (1,362 ft) platform islands. There will also be capacity for through-running services on two centrally placed tracks, leading to a total of six tracks. The station structure will be formed by a steel and glulam timber frame, with repeating structural forms on a nine by nine grid.

== Services ==
Current service proposals suggest five trains per hour will stop at Birmingham Interchange, in each direction. Journey time from this station to London is planned to be 38 minutes.

== Transport links ==
A proposed 17 km (11 miles) long branch of the West Midlands Metro would terminate at this station, connecting it to the local tram network.

The station will be built on a triangular piece of land, surrounded by the M42 motorway, A446 and A45, and will be linked to the National Exhibition Centre, Birmingham Airport and Birmingham International railway station by a people mover. The people mover will have a capacity of over 2,100 passengers per hour in each direction in the peak period.
