= Kavala International Airport =

Airport in Greece

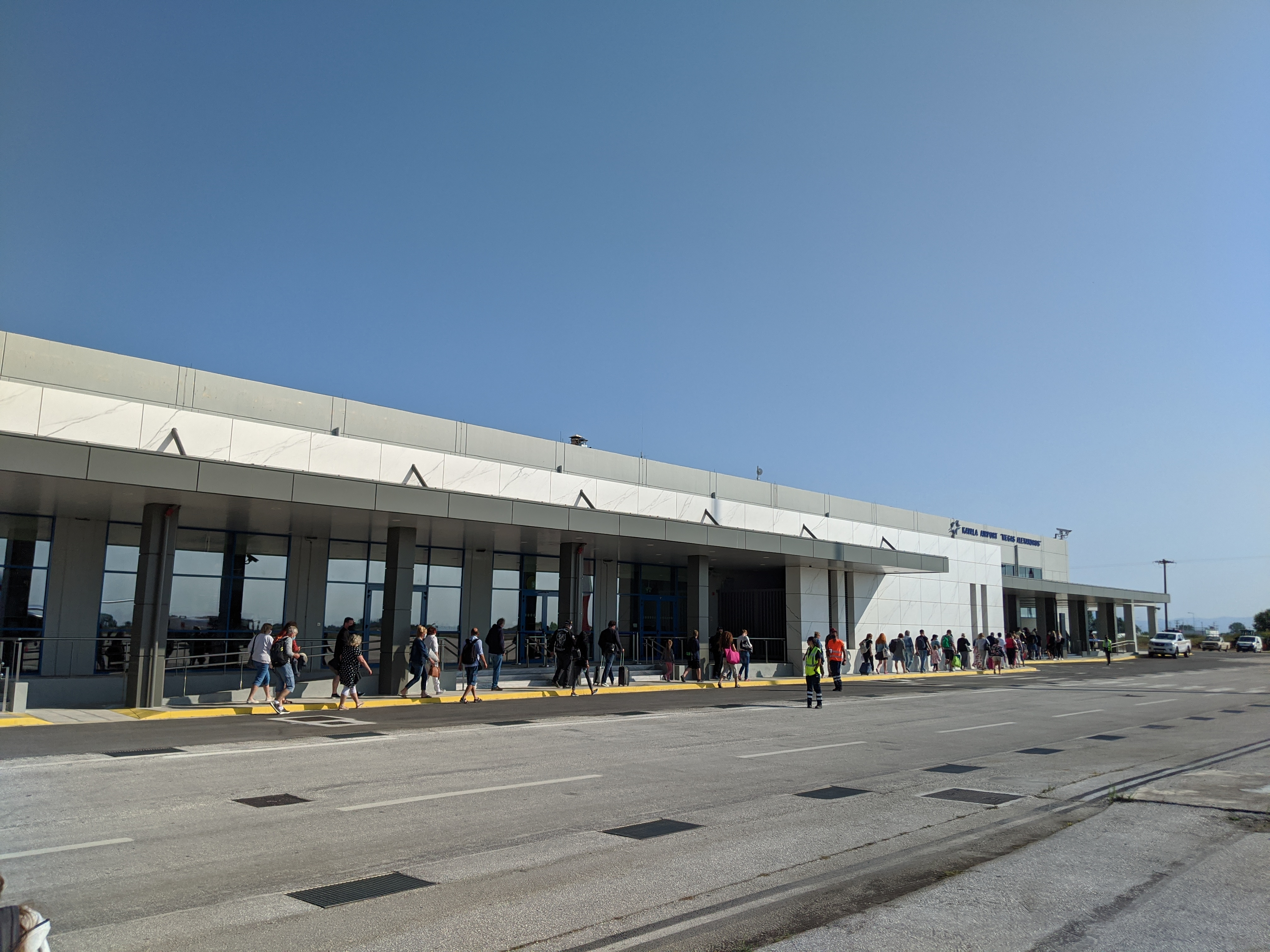
- IATA: KVA; ICAO: LGKV

Summary
- Airport type: Public
- Operator: Fraport AG/Copelouzos Group joint venture
- Serves: Kavala
- Location: Chrysoupoli
- Elevation AMSL: 18 ft (5.5 m)
- Coordinates: 40°54′48″N 024°37′09″E
- Website: kva-airport.gr

Map
- Location of airport in Greece

Runways
Direction	Length		Surface
Direction	m	ft	Surface
05/23	3,000	9,844	Asphalt

Statistics (2025)
- Passengers: 318,864
- Passenger traffic change: ▲8.4%
- Aircraft movements: 3,122
- Aircraft movements change: ▲6.3%
- Sources: Fraport-Greece

Kavala International Airport, also known as Kavala Airport "Alexander the Great" (Greek: Κρατικός Αερολιμένας Καβάλας 'Μ. Αλέξανδρος', Kratikós Aeroliménas Kaválas "M. Aléxandros") (IATA: KVA, ICAO: LGKV), is an airport located in the municipality of Nestos, in Greece, serving the city of Kavala, in Eastern Macedonia and Thrace.

== History ==
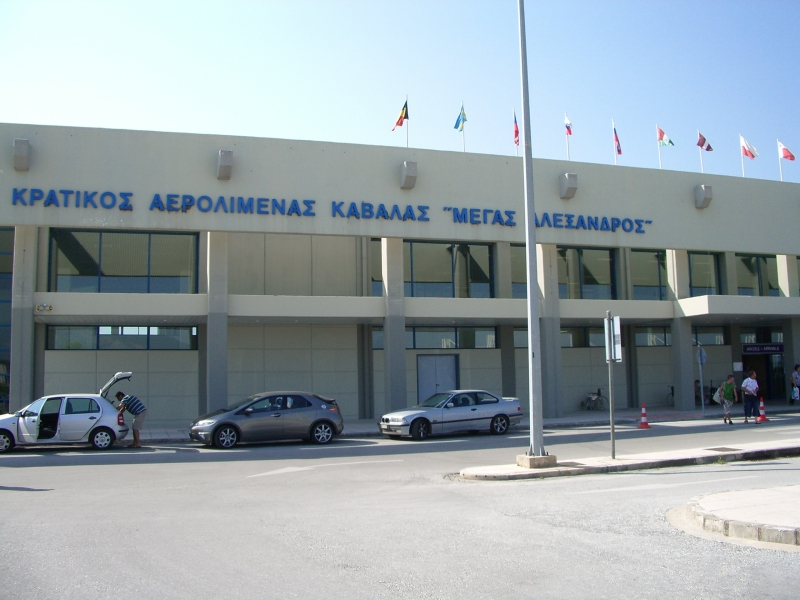
The terminal

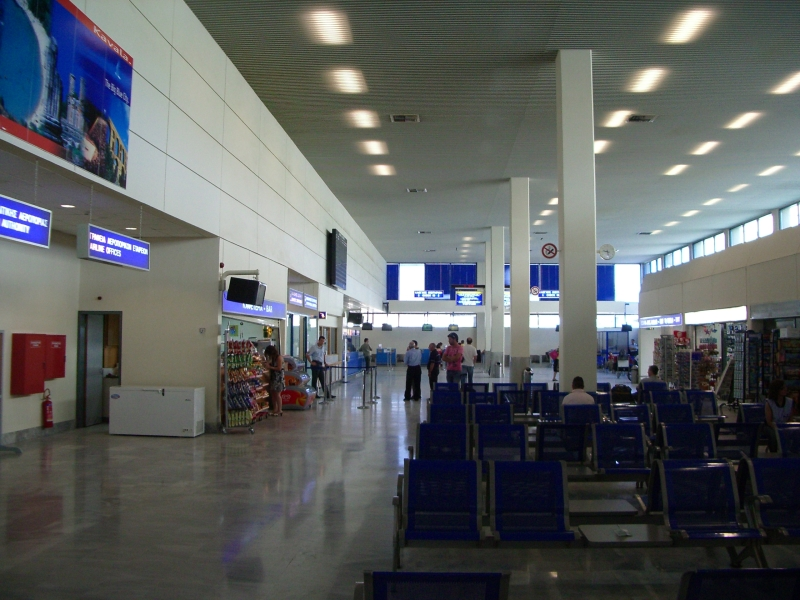
Airport's interior

Kavala's first airport was located closer to Kavala, in the installations of the Greek Air Force, near the village of Amygdaleonas, where it began its operations in 1952 as Kavala National Airport. On 12 October 1981, a new airport opened near the town of Chrysoupoli, where it still operates.

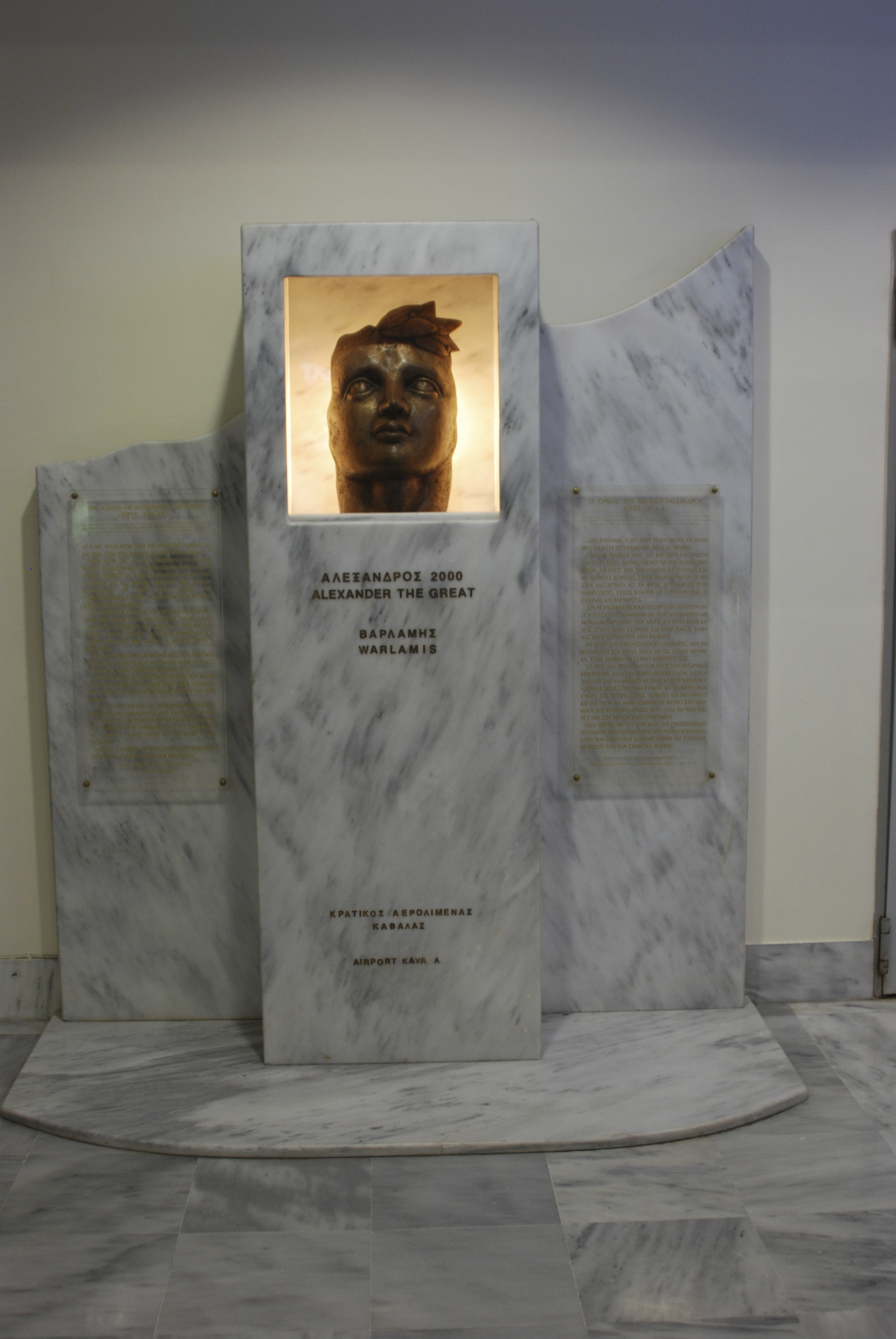
A bust of Alexander the Great

The airport was initially used only for domestic flights, as the original name implies. In December 1987, by a joint decision of the Minister of Presidency and the Minister for Transport and Communications it was renamed to Kavala International Airport to be again renamed in January 1992 to Kavala International Airport "Megas Alexandros", by a decision of the Minister for Transport and Communications.

At the beginning of its operation at its new location, the building infrastructure of the airport included only a terminal building. The control tower, the fire station and the other installations were built later. A small extension to the terminal building was added in 1992. The runway had been built, with the same dimensions that it has today. In 1998, extensive works began for new building infrastructure and today the airport of Kavala is functioning as a single upgraded total (old and new installations together), including all modern facilities for service both to airlines and passengers, contributing to the growth of East Macedonia and Thrace.

In December 2015, the privatisation of Kavala International Airport and 13 other regional airports of Greece was finalised with the signing of the agreement between the Fraport AG/Copelouzos Group joint venture and the state privatisation fund. "We signed the deal today," the head of Greece's privatisation agency HRADF, Stergios Pitsiorlas, told Reuters. According to the agreement, the joint venture will operate the 14 airports (including Kavala International Airport) for 40 years as of 11 April 2017.

== Fraport Greece's investment plan ==
On 22 March 2017, Fraport Greece presented its master plan for the 14 Greek regional airports, including the International Airport of Kavala.

Immediate actions, to be implemented as soon as Fraport Greece takes over operations, before the launch of the 2017 summer season included:

- General clean-up
- Improving lighting, marking of airside areas
- Upgrading sanitary facilities
- Enhancing services and offering a new free Internet connection (WiFi)
- Implementing works to improve fire safety in all the areas of the airports

The following summarizes the enhancement changes that will start in October 2017 and will be implemented for Kavala International Airport, under Fraport Greece's investment plan, by 2021:

- Terminal expansion by 2,029 m^{2}
- Remodeling the current terminal
- HBS inline screening
- Refurbishing and expanding the fire station
- Expanding the waste water treatment plant or connection to municipal service
- Reorganizing the airport apron area
- Refurbishing the airside pavement
- 20 percent increase in the number of check-in counters (from 8 to 10)

== Airlines and destinations ==
The following airlines operate regular scheduled and charter flights at Kavala Airport:

Airlines	Destinations
Aegean Airlines	Athens
Air Serbia	Seasonal charter: Belgrade
Animawings	Seasonal: Bucharest–Otopeni, Timișoara (begins 8 June 2026)
Austrian Airlines	Seasonal: Vienna
Condor	Seasonal: Frankfurt, Munich, Nuremberg
Eurowings	Seasonal: Berlin (begins 12 July 2026), Cologne/Bonn, Düsseldorf
Jet2.com	Seasonal: Birmingham (begins 12 May 2027), London–Stansted (begins 11 May 2027), Manchester (begins 11 May 2027)
Smartwings	Seasonal charter: Brno, Prague, Warsaw-Chopin
TUI Airways	Seasonal: Birmingham, London–Gatwick, Manchester

== Statistics ==
The data taken from the Hellenic Civil Aviation Authority (CAA) until 2016 and from 2017 onwards from the Fraport Greece website.

Year	Passengers		
Year	Domestic	International	Total
2010	143,333	152,861	296,194
2011	▼93,271	▲159,036	▼252,307
2012	▼68,232	▼135,013	▼203,245
2013	▼64,545	▲144,855	▲209,400
2014	▲73,340	▲149,625	▲222,965
2015	▲78,745	▲165,000	▲243,745
2016	▼77,540	▲192,435	▲269,975
2017	▼75,284	▲262,679	▲337,963
2018	▼75,026	▲331,923	▲406,949
2019	▼68,328	▼254,982	▼323,310
2020	▼25,767	▼46,907	▼72,674
2021	▲32,708	▲116,438	▲149,146
2022	▲44,361	▲207,254	▲251,615
2023	▲57,267	▲247,147	▲304,414
2024	▲63,702	▼230,576	▼294,278
2025	▲84,137	▲234,727	▲318,864

=== Traffic statistics by country (2024) ===
Traffic by country at Kavala International Airport – 2024
Place	Country	Total passengers
1	Germany	121,778
2	Greece	63,702
3	Czech Republic	31,095
4	Poland	26,767
5	United Kingdom	25,681
6	Sweden	6,312
7	Lithuania	5,222
8	Slovakia	4,990
9	Denmark	4,437
10	Austria	3,560

== See also ==
- Transport in Greece
- Meridian Flight 3032, an Antonov An-12 that crashed while attempting an emergency landing at the airport, killing all 8 crew members
- Makedonia Airport
- Alexandroupoli Airport
