= Meridian Flight 3032 =

2022 aviation accident in Greece

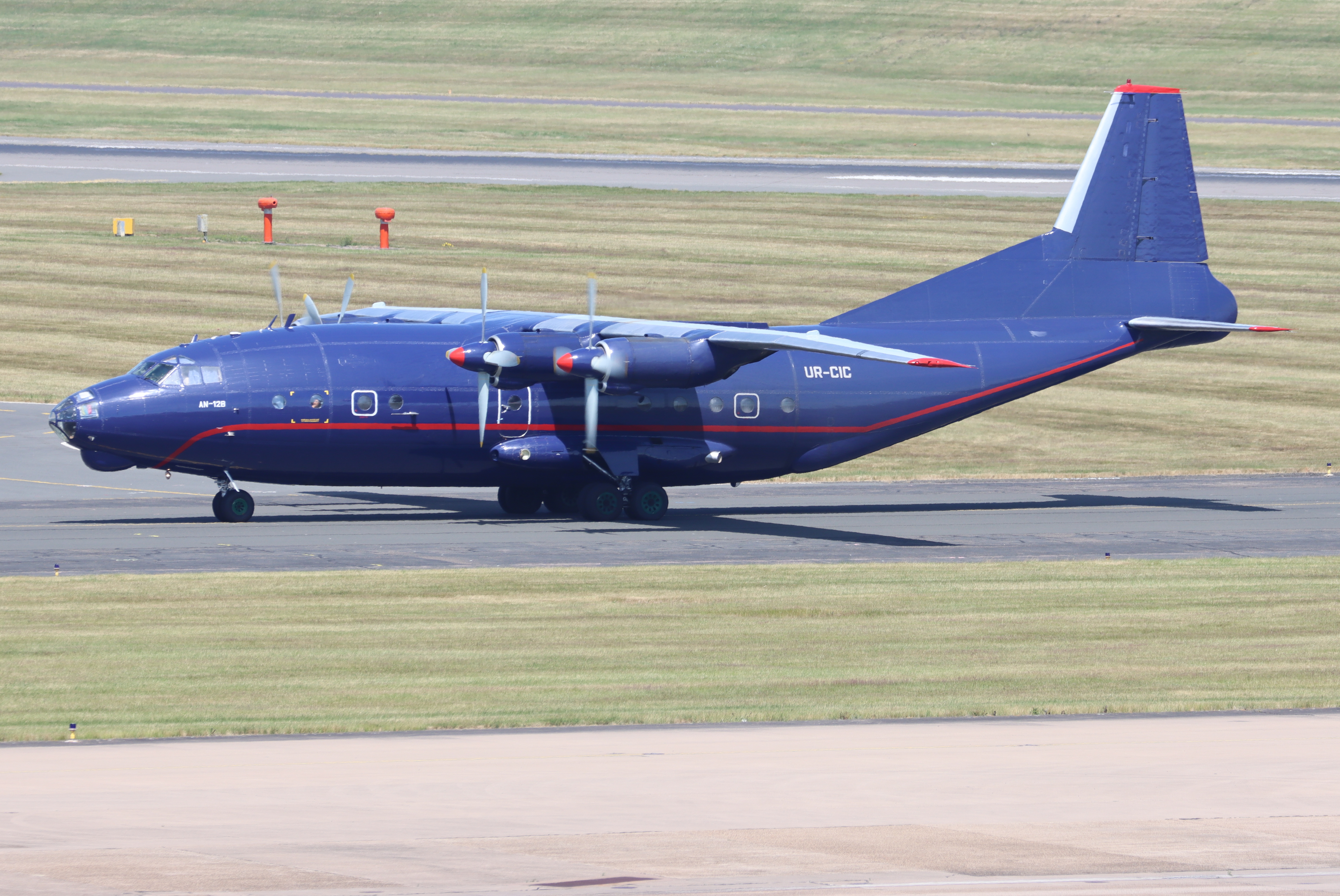
- UR-CIC, the aircraft involved, pictured seven days before the accident

Accident
- Date: 16 July 2022
- Summary: Crashed, under investigation
- Site: 16 km (10 mi) west of Kavala International Airport, Kavala, Greece; 40°58′N 24°12′E

Aircraft
- Aircraft type: Antonov An-12BK
- Operator: Meridian
- ICAO flight No.: MEM3032
- Call sign: MERIDIAN CHERRY 3032
- Registration: UR-CIC
- Flight origin: Niš Constantine the Great Airport, Niš, Serbia
- 1st stopover: Queen Alia International Airport, Amman, Jordan
- 2nd stopover: King Khalid International Airport, Riyadh, Saudi Arabia
- 3rd stopover: Sardar Vallabhbhai Patel International Airport, Ahmedabad, India
- Destination: Shahjalal International Airport, Dhaka, Bangladesh
- Occupants: 8
- Crew: 8
- Fatalities: 8
- Survivors: 0

On 16 July 2022, Meridian Flight 3032, an Antonov An-12BK flying from Serbia to Bangladesh via Jordan, Saudi Arabia, and India, crashed near Antiphilippi, Kavala, Greece while attempting to make an emergency landing at Kavala International Airport.

The aircraft was carrying 11.5 tonnes (11,500 kg; 25,000 lb) of munitions when it crashed, which continued exploding until the next day, hindering the inspection of the crash site.

== Aircraft ==
The aircraft involved first flew in 1971. It was acquired by Ukrainian cargo carrier Aviation Company Meridian in January 2022 and re-registered as UR-CIC.

== Crew and cargo ==
The eight crew members, all Ukrainian citizens, died in the crash.

According to Serbian defence minister Nebojša Stefanović, the aircraft's cargo was some 11 tonnes of Serbian-made weapons and ammunition, including mortar shells.

== Incident ==
The flight originated in Niš, Serbia and was bound for Dhaka, Bangladesh, with stops in Jordan, Saudi Arabia, and India.

The aircraft departed from Niš at 18:36 UTC, with some 11 tonnes of ammunition on board, scheduled to arrive at Dhaka. Intermediate stops were planned in Amman, Riyadh and Ahmedabad.

Eyewitness accounts and video showed that the plane was on fire before it crashed.

Secondary explosions were heard for up to two hours after the crash. Residents within a two kilometres (1.2 mi) radius were advised to close windows and stay indoors, while emergency responders, explosives experts and staff from the Greek Atomic Energy Commission were unable to inspect the wreckage due to uncertainty about the nature and state of any remaining cargo and residues. Drones were used instead to examine the wreckage.

== Weapons destination ==
Amid speculation that the weapons were destined for Ukraine, Serbia's defence minister Nebojša Stefanović stated that the weapons shipment was not linked to the Russo-Ukrainian War, and the Bangladesh Armed Forces confirmed that they were the intended recipients of the weapons, which they bought from a Polish-owned Bosnian company BA-METALEXPORT.

Given Serbia's policy of oscillating between the West and Russia and Serbia's weapons industry and political corruption, political scientist Vuk Vuksanovic continued to question whether the plane was indeed transporting Serbian weapons to Ukraine.

== Investigation ==
An investigation was opened by the Air Accident Investigation and Aviation Safety Board (AAIASB) with the support of the National Bureau of Air Accidents Investigation of Ukraine (NNBAAI). The Bundesstelle für Flugunfalluntersuchung (BFU) of Germany was able to download the Cockpit voice recorder that are providing all the essential data to the investigation.

The investigation found that the airplane was involved in another incident one month before the crash on June 19, 2022. As of December 2023 the investigation is still ongoing and no final report is released.
