= Birmingham Airport =

International airport in the West Midlands, England

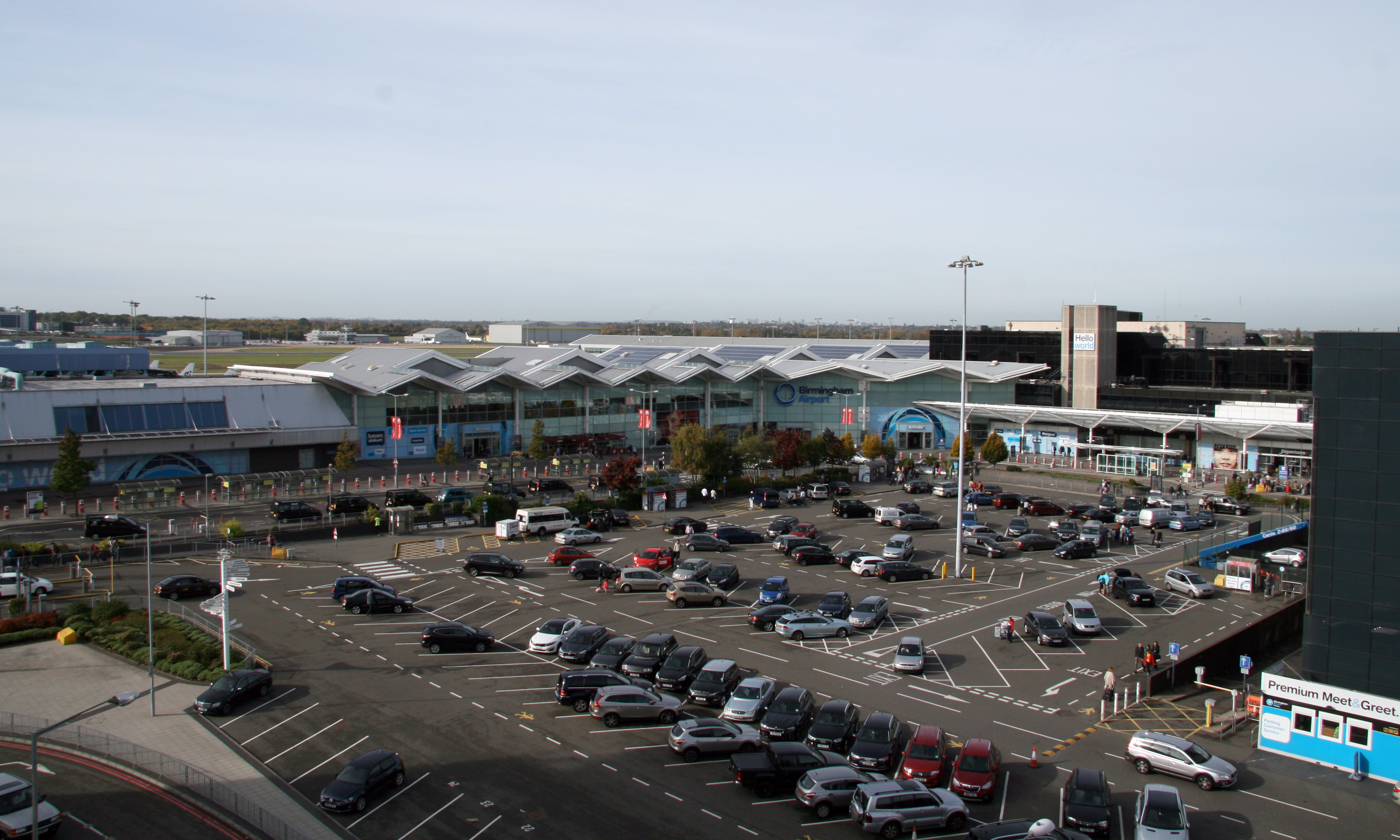
- IATA: BHX; ICAO: EGBB

Summary
- Airport type: Public
- Owner: Seven metropolitan boroughs of West Midlands county (49%), the Ontario Teachers' Pension Plan (48.25%) and employees (2.75%)
- Operator: Birmingham Airport Ltd
- Serves: Birmingham
- Location: Bickenhill, England
- Operating base for: easyJet; Jet2.com; Ryanair; TUI Airways
- Elevation AMSL: 341 ft (104 m)
- Coordinates: 52°27′14″N 001°44′53″W
- Website: www.birminghamairport.co.uk

Map
- Location in the West Midlands BHX/EGBB (West Midlands (region)) BHX/EGBB (the United Kingdom)

Runways
Direction	Length		Surface
Direction	m	ft	Surface
15/33	3,052	10,013	Asphalt

Statistics (2025)
- Passengers: 13,663,877▲
- Aircraft movements: 99,140▲
- Sources: UK AIP at NATS; Statistics from the UK Civil Aviation Authority

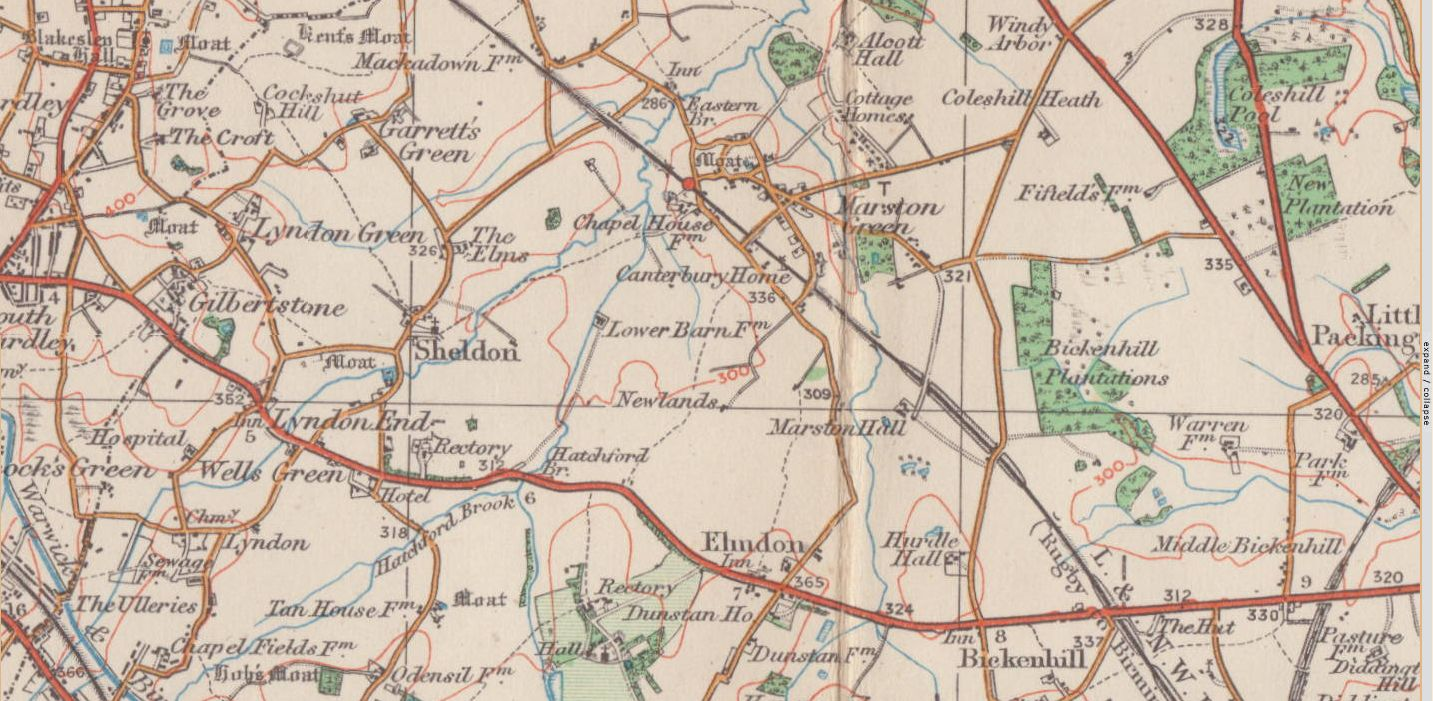
The airport site, as it was around 1921

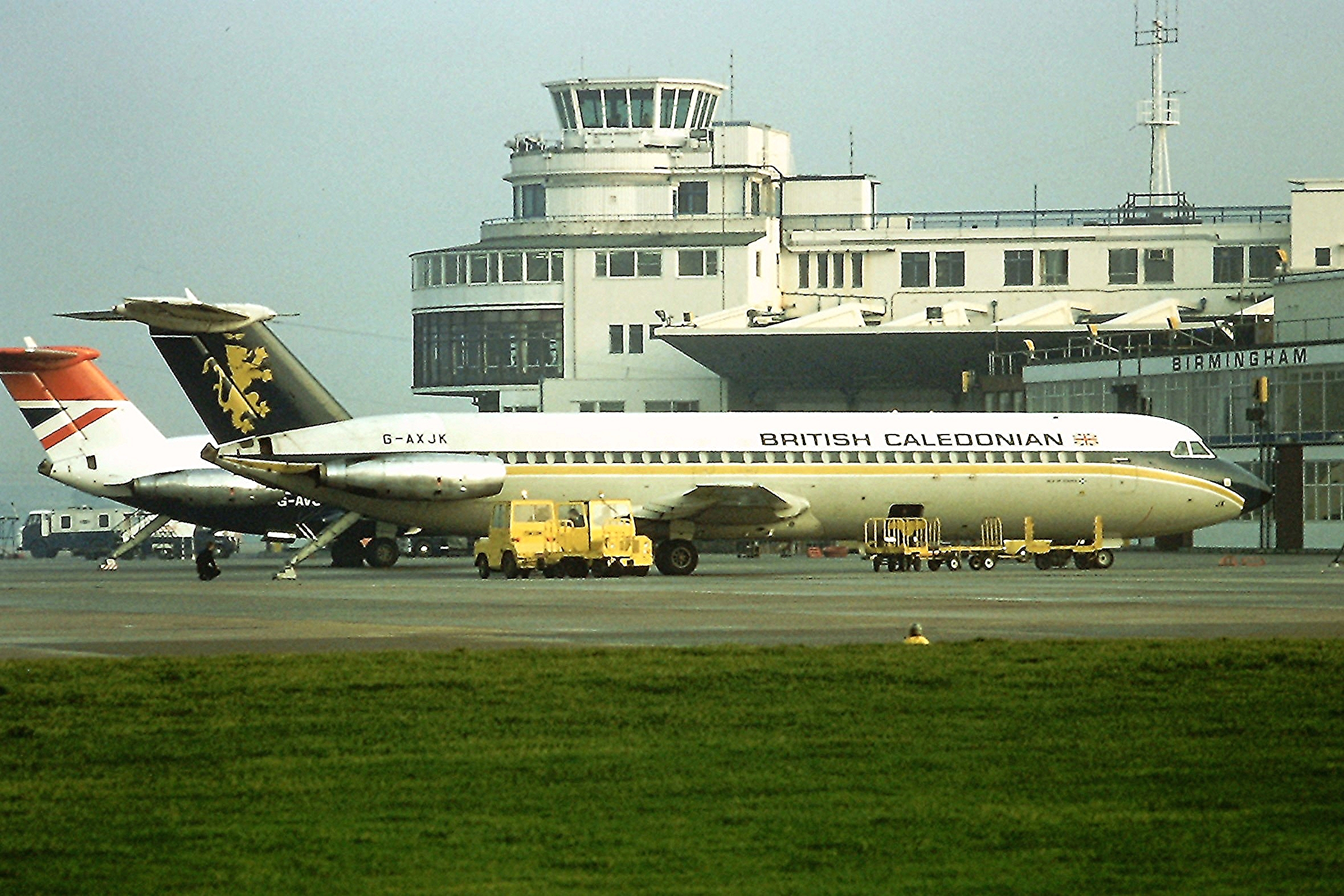
British Airways and British Caledonian aircraft at the old terminal in 1978

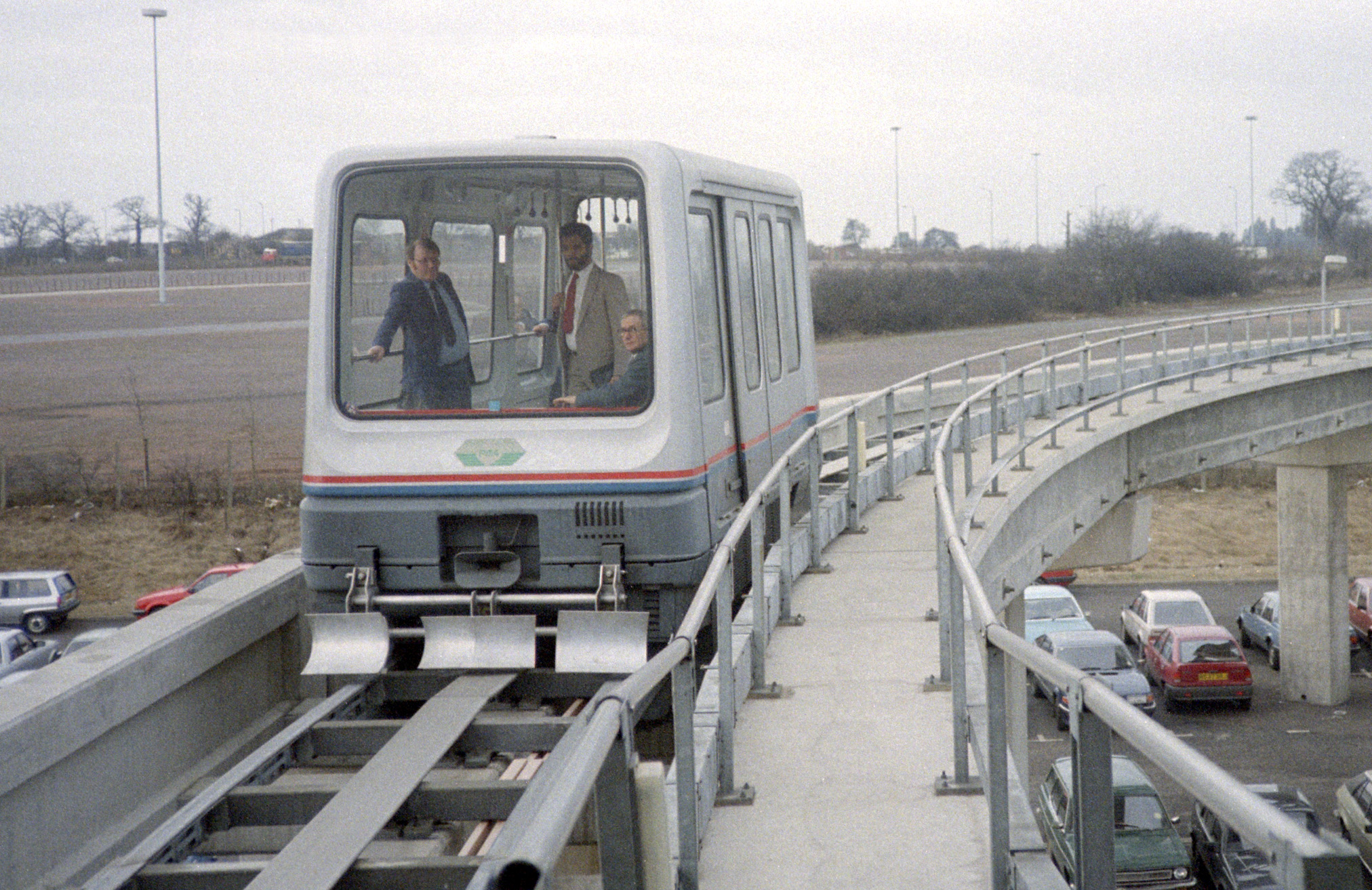
The Maglev rapid transport system, which operated from 1984 to 1995, was the first commercial maglev system in the world.

Birmingham Airport (IATA: BHX, ICAO: EGBB), formerly Birmingham International Airport, is an international airport in the Metropolitan Borough of Solihull, West Midlands, England. It lies 7 nautical miles (13 km; 8.1 mi) east-south-east of Birmingham city centre and 9.5 nautical miles (17.6 km; 10.9 mi) west-north-west of Coventry, slightly north of Bickenhill village.

Officially opened as Elmdon Airport on 8 July 1939, the airport was requisitioned by the Air Ministry during the Second World War and used by both the Royal Air Force (RAF) and the Royal Navy as RAF Elmdon. It was largely used for flight training and wartime production purposes. On 8 July 1946, the aerodrome was reopened to civilian operations.

Birmingham Airport currently holds a CAA Public Use Aerodrome Licence (no. P451) that allows flights for the public transport of passengers or for flying instruction. Passenger throughput in 2024 was over 12.8 million, making it the seventh busiest airport in the UK. In 2025, while maintaining its seventh position, it served 13.66 million passengers, accounting for 4.6% of all airport passengers.

The airport offers international flights to destinations in Europe, Africa, the Middle East, North America, Caribbean and the Indian subcontinent. Birmingham Airport is an operating base for easyJet, Jet2.com, Ryanair and TUI Airways.

== Location ==
Birmingham Airport is 7 NM (13 km; 8.1 mi) east-south-east of Birmingham city centre, in the Metropolitan Borough of Solihull. It is bordered by the National Exhibition Centre to the east, Marston Green to the north, Sheldon to the west, the village of Bickenhill to the south, and the village of Elmdon to the south west.

It is primarily served by the A45 main road, and is near Junction 6 of the M42 motorway. It is connected by the elevated Air-Rail Link with Birmingham International railway station on the West Coast Main Line.

The airport's location southeast of the city, plus the only operational runway being northwest–southeast (15/33), means that depending on wind direction, aircraft land or take-off directly over Birmingham. The former northeast–southwest runway (06/24) has been incorporated into a taxiway for aircraft accessing runway 15/33.

== History ==
=== Construction and opening ===
In 1928, Birmingham City Council decided that the city required a municipal airport; thus soon thereafter a committee was established to work towards establishing such a facility. By 1931, several locations, including Shirley, Elmdon and Aldridge, were reportedly under consideration as potential sites. While Elmdon was considered to be an impressive and appropriate site for the airport, further progress was delayed due to spending cutbacks that had been initiated as a consequence of the Great Depression. By 1933, the project was revived and a new airport committee was formed during the following year to oversee the airport's establishment. Prior to any major construction decisions being taken, members of the committee visited various successful airports around Europe in 1935, including Amsterdam, Berlin, Lyon, Paris, Brussels and London.

During January 1935, the airport committee approached British architectural and engineering practice Norman and Dawbarn, inviting their attendance and seeking their participation as expert advisers on the airport's construction, the practice was subsequently appointed as the project's architects. In 1933, Birmingham City Council authorised the compulsory purchase of 300 acres of land for the use by the airport; another 214 acres were similarly acquired during the following year. During 1936, a private bill presented by the Birmingham Corporation was passed through Parliament, which authorised the acquisition of further land as well as the diversion of various roads and footpaths to permit the airport's development. Shortly following the bill's passing, various agencies, including the City Engineer and Surveyor, the Public Works Department and a firm of aeronautical consultants, including Norman and Dawbarn, commenced work on preparing the ground, designing both the terminal and hangar buildings, and planning out the airport's detailed layout.

By January 1937, Norman and Dawbarn had been authorised to finalise the design drawings; these were apparently completed by June 1937. In October of that year, various contractors were appointed to construct various elements of the airport's buildings, including its elaborate terminal. Reportedly, the project's total expenditure amounted to around £360,000. Construction work proceeded at a rapid pace; on 1 May 1939, the airport had been completed to such a degree that it was ready to handle traffic.

On 8 July 1939, the Duchess of Kent, Princess Marina of Greece and Denmark, accompanied by the Prime Minister, Neville Chamberlain, officiated at the opening of Elmdon Airport. Its terminal, which incorporated the airport's air traffic control tower, was designed by Norman and Dawbarn in an Art Deco style; this facility would continue to be used as a terminal until 1984 and subsequently as staff offices and for private flights; it is still intact as of 2023. The airport was owned and operated by Birmingham City Council. Initial services flew to Croydon, Glasgow, Liverpool, Ryde, Shoreham, Manchester, and Southampton; further services were added soon thereafter, although its use as a civilian airport would soon be interrupted by the outbreak of the Second World War.

=== Second World War ===
During the Second World War, Elmdon Airport was requisitioned by the Air Ministry and was used by both the Royal Air Force (RAF) and the Royal Navy as RAF Elmdon. It was largely operated as an Elementary Flying School and a base for the Fleet Air Arm. It was during this era that the original grass airstrip was replaced by two hard runways: 06/24 at 2,469 feet (753 m) and 15/33 at 4,170 feet (1,271 m). Large numbers of Avro Lancaster and Stirling bombers were manufactured at the Austin Aero Company's shadow factory at Cofton Hackett, but were unable to take off from the short runways at Longbridge; thus, they were transported by road to RAF Elmdon, their wings being removed beforehand and re-attached after arrival. They were test flown from the aerodrome and, once declared airworthy, they were flown to their operational units. On 8 July 1946, the aerodrome was reopened to civilian operations, though it remained under government control.

=== 1950 to 1980 ===
During the post-war years, a number of public events, such as air fairs and air races, were held on the site. In 1949, scheduled services began with British European Airways (BEA) launching routes to Paris; the number of flights to the continent steadily grew over the years, including services to Zürich, Düsseldorf, Palma, Amsterdam and Barcelona commencing between 1955 and 1960. During 1960, the City of Birmingham resumed responsibility for the airport's operation again, ending central government control.

In 1961, an additional terminal building to handle the growing international traffic was opened, which was fittingly called The International Building. Furthermore, work to extend the airport's main runway to 7,400 feet (1.4 miles) was undertaken between 1967 and 1970, which permitted the launch of new services using turboprop and jet-powered airliners. Accordingly, a new service to New York using VC-10 airliner was launched during 1967. By the early 1970s, Birmingham Airport was reportedly handling around one million passengers per year, albeit through a relatively congested passenger terminal. In 1974, the newly formed West Midlands Metropolitan County Council took over management of the airport.

On 16 September 1980, the supersonic airliner Concorde made its first visit to Birmingham Airport. On 20 October 2003, Concorde made its final visit to the airport as part of its farewell tour.

=== 1981 to 2000 ===
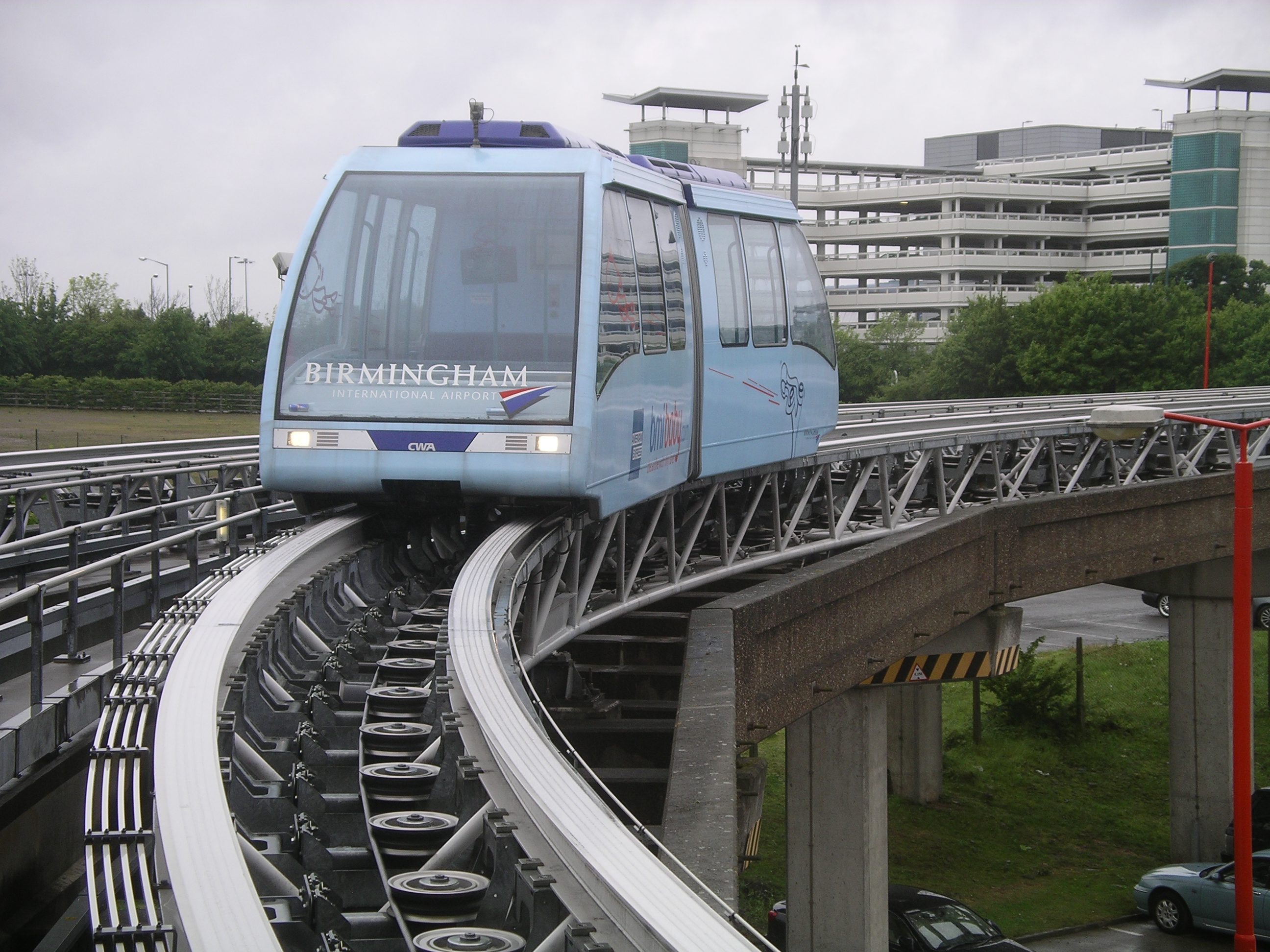
The Air-Rail Link joins the railway station to the airport, operated by a track and pulley system

Birmingham Airport was once home to the world's first commercial maglev system in the form of a low-speed maglev shuttle that ran along a 620-metre line between the terminal and the nearby Birmingham International railway station. Following a year of testing and trial use, the Birmingham Airport Maglev was opened to great fanfare during April 1984. However, during 1995, the Maglev rail link was discontinued after 11 years; the closure has been attributed to the system's unreliability, it having suffered from frequent breakdowns. The original guideway lay dormant but intact for a time, while proposals for its restoration or adaption for other uses were considered. In 2003, a replacement cable-hauled system, the Air-Rail Link Cable Liner people mover, was opened, which reused the track and much of the existing infrastructure.

=== 2000s ===
During November 2007, Birmingham Airport published a master plan for its development up to 2030, called "Towards 2030: Planning a Sustainable Future for Air Transport in the Midlands". This set out details of changes to the terminals, airfield layout and off-site infrastructure. As with all large scale plans, the proposals were controversial, with opposition from environmentalists and local residents. In particular, the requirement for a second parallel runway based on projected demand was disputed by opponents. Plans for a second runway (a third when demand requires) on the other side of the M42 and a new terminal complex and business park have been published, and they could help to create around 250,000 jobs. It has been estimated that if these plans went ahead, the airport could handle around 70,000,000 passengers annually, and around 500,000 aircraft movements.

In January 2008, the shorter runway (06/24) was decommissioned. It had been used less often due to its short length, noise impact, and its inconvenient position crossing the main runway, making it uneconomic to continue operation. The closure also allowed for apron expansion on both sides of the main runway. However, runway 06/24 remains open as a taxiway and a helicopter airstrip. In the same month, plans for the extension of the airport runway and the construction of a new air traffic control tower were submitted to Solihull Metropolitan Borough Council.

In June 2008, work began on building the new three-storey International Pier; it was officially opened on 9 September 2009. As part of the airport's 70th anniversary, the airport welcomed the Airbus A380 as the first user of the pier. The special service was the first commercial A380 flight in the UK outside London Heathrow Airport. The new pier is 240 metres long and 24 metres wide. Departing passengers are accommodated on the top level, with arriving passengers on the middle level and office accommodation for airline and handling agents on the ground floor. The new facility provides air-bridged aircraft parking for seven wide-bodied aircraft and enough space for 13 smaller aircraft. It can accommodate 'next generation' environmentally-efficient wide-bodied aircraft such as the Airbus A340-600, the Airbus A380, the Boeing 747-8, and the Boeing 777X. The new pier also has a new lounge for business class Emirates passengers. In March 2009, the runway extension plans were approved.

=== 2010s ===
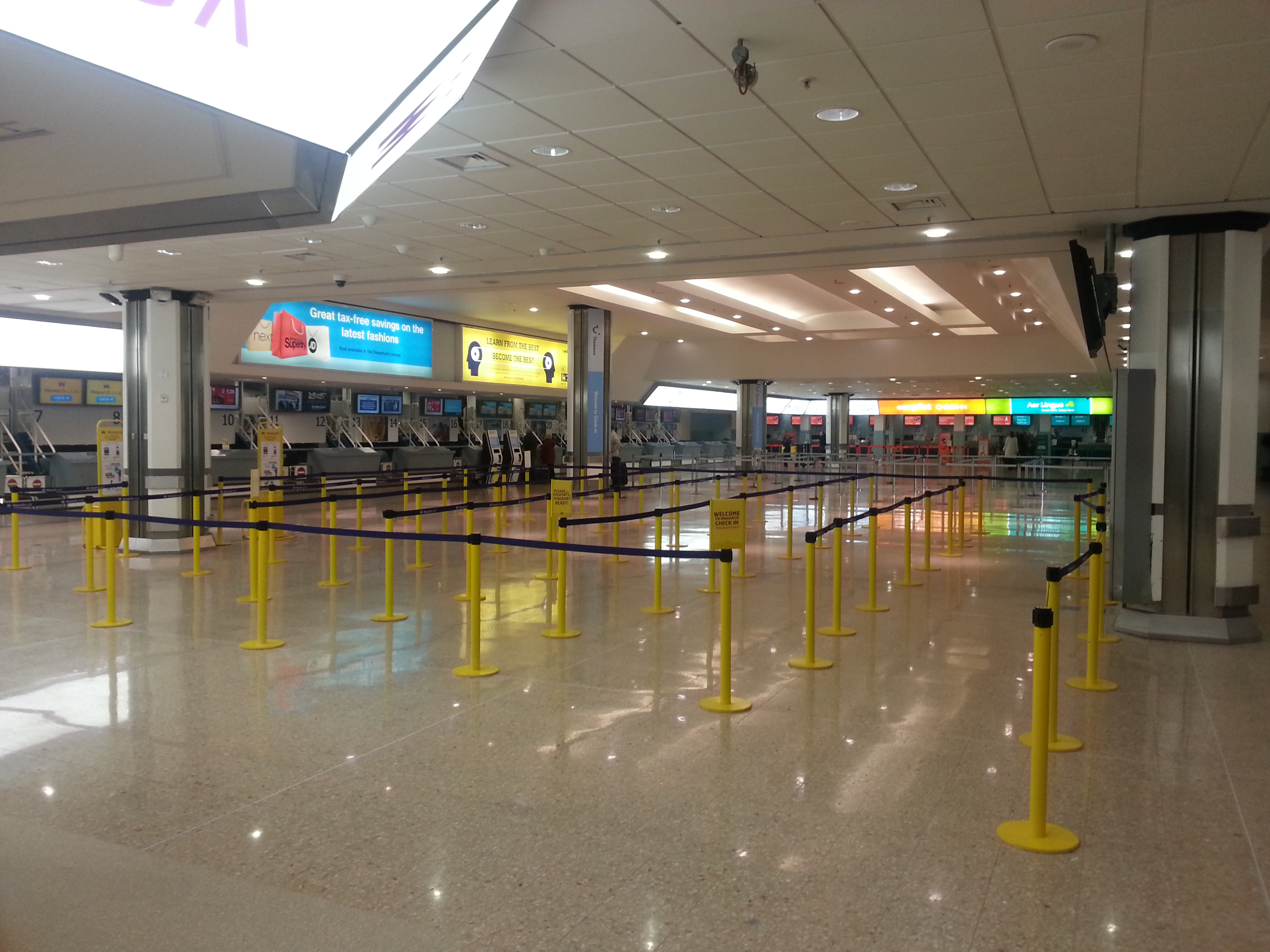
Main check-in hall in Terminal 1

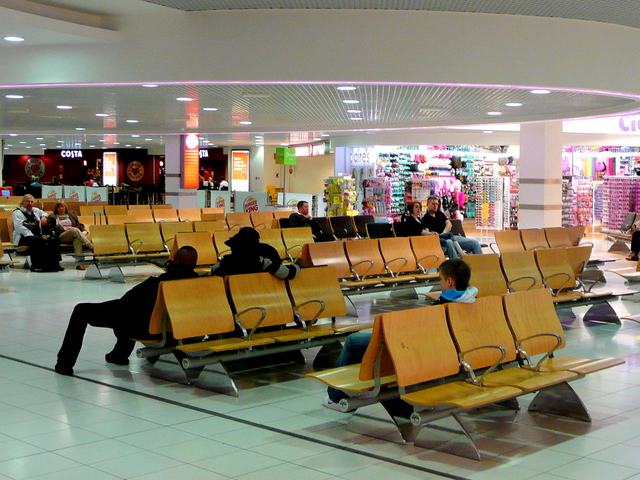
Departure lounge area

In September 2010, it was announced that after the merging of Terminals 1 and 2 into a single facility in 2011, the airport would drop the "International" from its official name to become "Birmingham Airport'". A Midlands-based marketing agency was recruited to "create a new corporate identity that reflects Birmingham Airport's current position in the market place, as well as its future potential". Figures from Birmingham Airport show that 8 million people live within a one hour's drive of the airport, but less than 40% of them use it. It was hoped that the rebrand would make the airport "more visible to the market". The new name was used from November 2010. The new logo, interlocking circles in shades of blue, and slogan, "Hello World", was designed to reflect the airport as a global travel hub.

In January 2011, the viewing gallery, 'Aviation Experience And Gift Shop', closed indefinitely. In the same month, the airport merged its two terminals into a single terminal building, which involved the construction of two additional floors. A new lower ground floor accommodates the new Arrivals and Meet & Greet area, while the 3rd floor was built in the Millennium Link and the two terminals to accommodate the new centralised security search area.

Plans for the extension of the airport's runway, and the construction of the new air traffic control tower, were submitted to Solihull Metropolitan Borough Council in January 2008, and approved in March 2009. Originally, the target for completion was in time for the 2012 London Olympics and Paralympics. The new control tower was completed in March 2012, replacing the original tower which had been used since the airport opened in 1939. An ceremony was held at the airport on 23 April 2012, in the build-up to the London 2012 Olympic Games. The Olympic rings were unveiled on the tower and could be seen from the A45 road and the main terminal building. These rings were removed once the Olympic Games officially closed, just before the 2012 Summer Paralympics began. The new tower became fully operational in summer 2013.

Work on the new runway eventually began in autumn 2012. The extension to the southern end of the runway originally required the A45 Coventry Road to be diverted into a tunnel under the extended section, but to cut costs, it was diverted south of the runway instead. In May 2014, the 400-metre runway extension was officially opened; the full length was first used on 22 July 2014, when China Southern Airlines operated its first charter between Birmingham and Beijing.

The Ontario Teachers' Pension Plan, a Canadian institutional investor, increased its stake in the airport to 48.25% in early 2015. It also owns 100% of Bristol Airport. Birmingham handled over 11.6 million passengers in 2016, a record total for the airport, making it the seventh busiest UK airport.

On 28 September 2016, £100 million of investment was allocated to a new baggage handling system and two new car parks, including a drop-off car park.

=== 2020s ===
British regional airline Flybe operated an extensive route network from Birmingham to destinations within the United Kingdom and mainland Europe until it entered administration on 4 March 2020. It subsequently resumed operations using the airport as its headquarters and main base of operations. In 2020, during the COVID-19 pandemic, a temporary mortuary was established in a hangar at the airport, with space for 12,000 bodies.

On 13 January 2023, Emirates announced that they would return to flying the iconic Airbus A380 on their daily flights to Birmingham Airport from 1 July 2023. Previously, Emirates had used the Airbus A380 on their flights to Birmingham since 2016; however, they resumed using the Boeing 777 during the COVID-19 pandemic due to reduced demand.

In January 2023, regional airline Flybe, successor to the aforementioned airline of the same name, which maintained its main base in Birmingham, entered administration and ceased all operations.

== Terminals ==
Birmingham Airport's current terminal complex combines the two former terminals via the Millennium Link into one large terminal, with gates 1–20 in the old Terminal 2, and all other gates in the old Terminal 1. All check in desks and arrivals are on the ground floor. The central security area, along with airside shops and restaurants are located on the first floor.

Terminal 1 was opened on 3 April 1984, seventeen years after the original plans to construct a new terminal to ease congestion in the original Elmdon Terminal (Grade II listed since August 2018 and now used for private and VIP flights). Since then, Terminal 1 has been extended multiple times to accommodate the increase in both passenger numbers and aircraft movements.

== Airlines and destinations ==
=== Passenger ===
Birmingham Airport passenger destinations

The following airlines operate regular scheduled and charter services to and from Birmingham:

Airlines	Destinations
Aer Lingus	Belfast–City, Dublin
Air Dolomiti	Frankfurt
Air France	Paris–Charles de Gaulle
Air India	Amritsar
Air Transat	Seasonal: Toronto–Pearson (begins 23 June 2027)
Aurigny	Guernsey
Corendon Airlines	Seasonal: Antalya
EasyJet	Agadir, Alicante, Amsterdam, Antalya, Barcelona, Belfast–International, Berlin, Derry, Edinburgh, Enfidha, Fuerteventura, Geneva, Gibraltar, Glasgow, Gran Canaria, Hurghada, Inverness, Jersey, Lanzarote, Lisbon, Málaga, Malta, Marrakesh, Milan–Malpensa (resumes 29 March 2027), Nice, Paris–Charles de Gaulle, Prague, Rome–Fiumicino, Sharm El Sheikh, Tenerife–South; Seasonal: Bordeaux, Copenhagen, Corfu, Dalaman, Faro, Grenoble, Heraklion, Innsbruck, Kos, Kraków, Larnaca, Palma de Mallorca, Reykjavík–Keflavík, Rhodes, Rovaniemi, Tivat (begins 3 May 2027)
Egyptair	Cairo
Emirates	Dubai–International
Eurowings	Düsseldorf
Jet2.com	Agadir, Alicante, Antalya, Barcelona, Budapest, Faro, Fuerteventura, Funchal, Gran Canaria, Hurghada (begins 13 February 2027), Kraków, Lanzarote, Málaga, Malta, Marrakesh, Paphos, Prague, Rome–Fiumicino, Sharm El Sheikh (begins 12 February 2027), Tenerife–South; Seasonal: Almería, Athens, Bergen, Bergerac (begins 22 May 2027), Bodrum, Burgas, Catania, Chambéry, Chania, Cologne/Bonn, Copenhagen, Corfu, Dalaman, Dubrovnik, Enfidha (begins 1 May 2027), Gdańsk, Geneva, Girona, Grenoble, Heraklion, Ibiza, Innsbruck, İzmir, Jerez de la Frontera, Jersey (begins 2 May 2027), Kalamata, Kavala (begins 12 May 2027), Kefalonia, Kos, Larnaca, Menorca, Mytilene, Naples, Nice, Olbia, Palermo, Palma de Mallorca, Pisa, Porto, Preveza/Lefkada, Pula, Reus, Rhodes, Salzburg, Samos, Santorini, Skiathos, Split, Tallinn, Thessaloniki, Tivat, Turin, Venice, Verona, Vienna, Zakynthos
KLM	Amsterdam
Loganair	Aberdeen, Isle of Man
Lufthansa	Frankfurt, Munich
Lufthansa City Airlines	Munich
Pakistan International Airlines	Islamabad (resumes 1 December 2026)
Pegasus Airlines	Istanbul–Sabiha Gökçen
Qatar Airways	Doha
Ryanair	Agadir, Alicante, Barcelona, Beauvais, Bergamo, Berlin, Bucharest–Otopeni, Budapest, Bydgoszcz, Copenhagen, Dublin, Faro, Fuerteventura, Gran Canaria, Knock, Kraków, Lanzarote, Lisbon, Łódź, Madrid, Málaga, Malta, Marrakesh, Murcia, Palma de Mallorca, Paphos, Porto, Poznań, Rome–Fiumicino, Seville, Shannon, Sofia, Tenerife–South, Tirana, Treviso, Valencia, Verona, Warsaw–Modlin; Seasonal: Chania, Corfu, Girona, Grenoble, Ibiza, Perpignan, Pisa, Plovdiv, Reus, Rhodes, Rovaniemi, Salzburg, Santander, Stockholm–Arlanda, Toulouse, Turin, Wroclaw (begins 31 March 2027), Zadar
Scandinavian Airlines	Copenhagen
SunExpress	Antalya; Seasonal: Dalaman, İzmir
Swiss International Air Lines	Zurich
TUI Airways	Agadir, Boa Vista, Cancún, Hurghada, Montego Bay, Sal, Sharm El Sheikh, Tenerife–South; Seasonal: Alicante, Antalya, Banjul, Barbados, Budapest, Burgas, Chambéry, Chania, Corfu, Dalaman, Dubrovnik, Funchal, Girona, Heraklion, Ibiza, Innsbruck, Kavala, Kefalonia, Kittilä, Kos, Kuusamo, La Romana, Larnaca, Málaga, Menorca, Naples, Oslo (begins 13 December 2026), Palma de Mallorca, Paphos, Pula, Punta Cana, Reus, Rhodes, Rovaniemi, Salzburg, Skiathos, Sofia, Thessaloniki, Toulouse, Turin, Verona, Zakynthos
Turkish Airlines	Istanbul
Vueling	Barcelona
Wizz Air	Craiova; Seasonal: Bucharest–Otopeni, Suceava

=== Cargo ===
Airlines	Destinations
Lufthansa Cargo	Frankfurt
Maersk Air Cargo	Billund

== Statistics ==
	Passengers (Note: Number of Passengers including domestic, international and transit.)	Aircraft movements (Note: Number of Movements represents total takeoffs and landings during that year.)
1997	6,025,485	79,880
1998	6,709,086	88,332
1999	7,013,913	98,749
2000	7,596,893	108,972
2001	7,808,562	111,008
2002	8,027,730	112,284
2003	9,079,172	116,040
2004	8,862,388	109,202
2005	9,381,425	112,963
2006	9,147,384	108,658
2007	9,226,340	114,679
2008	9,627,589	112,227
2009	9,102,899	101,221
2010	8,572,398	95,454
2011	8,616,296	93,145
Source: UK Civil Aviation Authority

	Passengers	Aircraft movements
2012	8,922,539	92,632
2013	9,120,201	95,713
2014	9,705,955	97,346
2015	10,187,122	98,015
2016	11,645,334	113,184
2017	12,983,436	122,067
2018	12,457,051	104,492
2019	12,650,607	109,357
2020	2,869,582	35,647
2021	2,476,584	35,411
2022	9,597,485	71,152
2023	11,479,335	82,234
2024	12,848,201	94,130
2025	13,663,877	99,140
Source: UK Civil Aviation Authority

=== Busiest routes ===
Busiest routes to and from Birmingham (2025)
Rank	Airport	Passengers handled	% change 2024/25
1	Dublin	871,092	▲7.5%
2	Dubai–International	607,026	▼0.3%
3	Amsterdam	589,928	▼0.1%
4	Palma de Mallorca	461,064	▲3.8%
5	Alicante	459,732	▲14.1%
6	Tenerife–South	426,928	▼2.5%
7	Málaga	379,817	▲5.1%
8	Antalya	358,179	▼0.8%
9	Paris–Charles de Gaulle	349,505	▲7.5%
10	Belfast–International	344,184	▼4.0%

== Accidents and incidents ==
- 29 November 1975: A Beechcraft Baron G-AZUJ was landing in heavy fog and crashed while overshooting on its third attempt to land. All four on board died in the crash.
- 4 January 2002: A Bombardier Challenger CL-600 N90AG crashed shortly after takeoff due to airframe icing, resulting in the deaths of all four occupants.
- 23 February 2006: Mahan Air Airbus A310 operating a flight from Tehran, Iran, was involved in a serious incident while on approach to Birmingham International Airport. The aircraft descended to the published minimum descent altitude of 740 ft despite still being 11 nm from the runway threshold. At a point 6 nm from the runway the aircraft had descended to an altitude of 660 ft, which was 164 ft above ground level. Having noticed the descent profile, Birmingham air traffic control issued an immediate climb instruction to the aircraft; however, the crew had already commenced a missed approach, having received a GPWS alert. The aircraft was radar vectored for a second approach during which the flight crew again initiated an early descent. On this occasion, the radar controller instructed the crew to maintain their altitude and the crew successfully completed the approach to a safe landing. The accident investigation determined that the primary cause was use of the incorrect DME for the approach, combined with a substantial breakdown in the Crew Resource Management. Three safety recommendations were made.
- 15 June 2006: A TNT Airways cargo 737-300 made an emergency landing at Birmingham with damaged landing gear. The aircraft, registration OO-TND, had been flying from Liège in Belgium to London–Stansted. Due to poor visibility at Stansted the flight diverted to East Midlands Airport. As the weather at East Midlands was also poor, the aircraft performed a full autopilot approach. During this approach the autopilot momentarily disengaged causing it to deviate from the course. The aircraft hit the grass to the side of the runway, which caused the right main gear to detach. The crew initiated a go-around, declared an emergency and diverted to Birmingham. After it landed on Birmingham's main runway, the airport was closed for a number of hours. The pilots were unharmed. However, the company ascribed the incident to human error and both pilots were dismissed. The official report into the accident highlighted a number of factors contributing to the accident: poor weather forecast information; a message passed from the air traffic control to the aircraft at an "inappropriate" time; the pilot accidentally disconnecting the autopilot when attempting to respond to the message; the pilot losing situational awareness and failing to abort the landing.
- 19 November 2010: A Cessna Citation aircraft, registration G-VUEM, arriving from Belfast International Airport crashed at Birmingham Airport during final approach in thick fog. The two crew on board were both injured, with one being airlifted to hospital. The aircraft was transporting a human liver for a transplant operation which was subsequently completed successfully. The airport reopened at around midday the following day.

=== Security incidents ===
- 6 June 2007: The Tonight with Trevor McDonald programme exposed serious security flaws at Birmingham Airport over six months. Fifteen members of staff working for the security contractor "ICTS UK Ltd" were suspended and subsequently dismissed for gross misconduct. Members of security were filmed asleep on duty, reading magazines whilst operating X-ray scanners, leaving aircraft unguarded, and ignoring bags sent for extra security checks, as well as being understaffed. The security lapse was deemed so serious, that Bennie Thompson, the chairman of the US Congress Homeland Security Committee, commented on it in the United States Congress and advised that all flights to and from Birmingham Airport should cease. ICTS dismissed the members of staff shown in the programme for their actions, but still claimed that the footage had been "contrived to exaggerate and sensationalise" the issues.
- 8 June 2009: The West Midlands Police helicopter (G-WMAO) was destroyed by arsonists. A year later, a new Eurocopter EC135 similar to G-WMAO was handed over to West Midlands Police at the Farnborough Airshow. Thousands of pounds were subsequently spent upgrading security surrounding the police helicopter.
- 17 July 2014: A member of the public entered the airfield by crawling through the opening of a baggage carousel, crossed the apron, and then boarded a Lufthansa Embraer 195 plane. He was subsequently fined.

== Ground transport ==
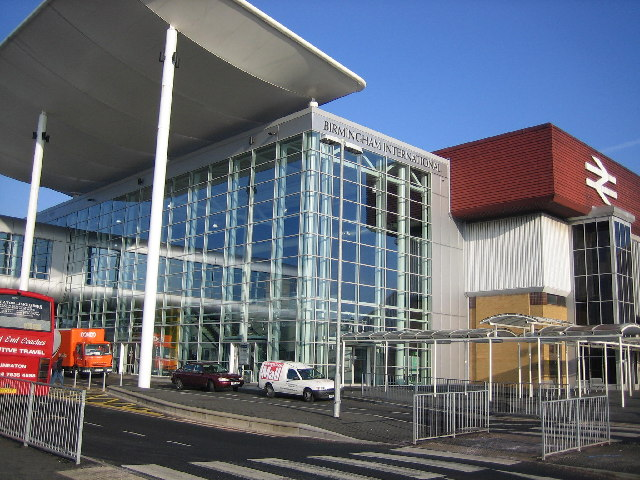
Birmingham International railway station

=== Public transport ===
==== Rail ====
Birmingham Airport is served by Birmingham International railway station. The station is on the West Coast Main Line between Birmingham and London, and trains are operated by West Midlands Trains, Avanti West Coast, Transport For Wales, and CrossCountry. Access between the railway station and the airport terminal is provided by the free Air-Rail Link.

==== Bus and coach ====
West Midlands Bus operates the main bus routes calling at Birmingham Airport, those being the X1 to Birmingham city centre and Coventry, the X12 to Chelmsley Wood and Solihull, and the 96 to Chelmsley Wood, Erdington and Kingstanding. Other smaller operators also call at the airport. Bus stops are situated outside Terminal One. Most buses are operated by West Midlands Bus.

National Express operates various long-distance coaches calling at Birmingham Airport on the way to or from Birmingham coach station.

=== Taxi ===
Black cabs are available at the taxi-rank outside the arrivals area of the terminal.

=== Car ===
Birmingham Airport is accessible from the north and south via Junction Six of the M42 motorway. From Birmingham city centre, the A45 runs directly to the airport. Parking charges apply in some areas even for very short periods of time, with locations farther from the airport being cheaper than those near the airport.

=== Bicycle ===
The only cycle route available heads south over the A45 travelling towards Solihull. Birmingham Airport has, however, published "recommended routes" for cyclists. Free short term cycle parking is available close to the terminal. For longer stays, bicycles must be stored in the Left Luggage for a charge.

=== Future transport links ===
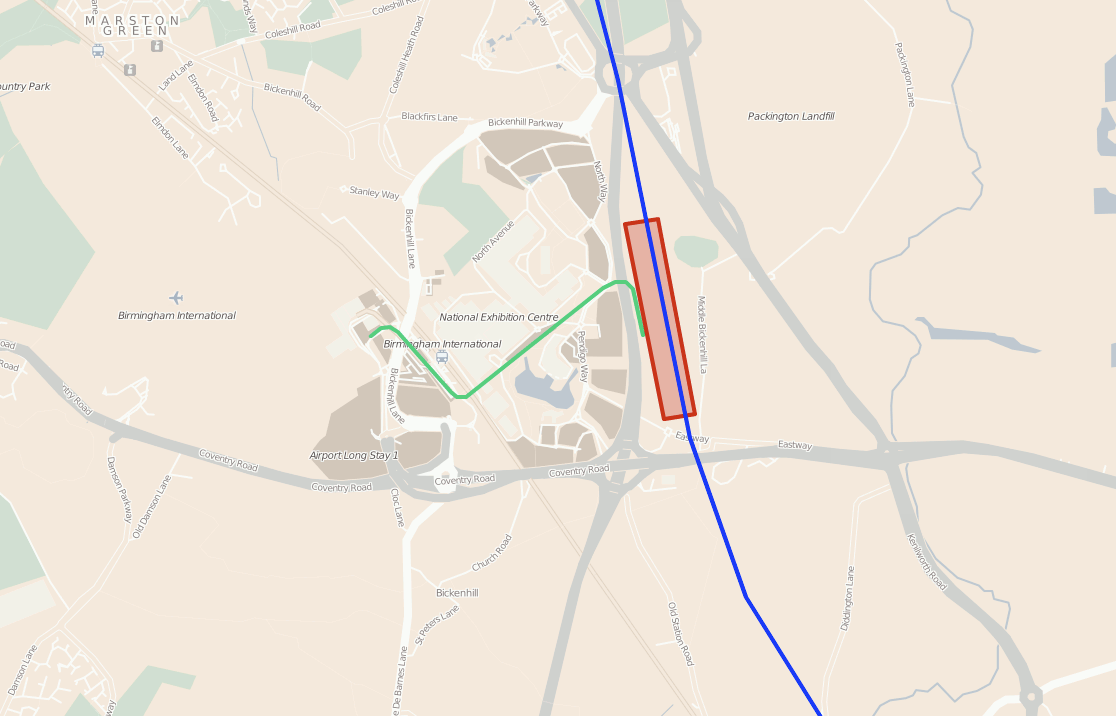
The proposed 'Birmingham Interchange'

==== High Speed 2 ====
As part of Phase 1 of the High Speed 2 rail link, a new railway station called Birmingham Interchange will be built to serve both the airport and the National Exhibition Centre. The station will be built on the far side of the M42 motorway and connect to the airport using a "rapid transit people mover".

==== West Midlands Metro ====
Funding has been approved to construct the "East Birmingham & Solihull Metro Extension" to the West Midlands Metro. This would link Birmingham Interchange, Birmingham International, and Birmingham Airport to the city centre.

== See also ==
- Transport in Birmingham
