= Hellenic Bureau for Marine Casualties Investigation =

Hellenic Bureau for Marine Casualties Investigation (HBMCI, Greek: Ελληνική Υπηρεσία Διερεύνησης Ναυτικών Ατυχημάτων και Συμβάντων, ΕΛΥΔΝΑ) is a Greek government agency that investigates accidents and incidents to ships at sea. Its head office is in Piraeus.

HBMCI was founded under the provisions of the EU Directive 2009/18/EC incorporated in Greek national legislative framework by Law 4033/2011 (Official Government Gazette 264 A), as amended. Officially, HBMCI began operations by October 2012. By 2017, more than 2,000 accidents and incidents to marine vessels had been reported to HBMCI.
