= List of acts of the Parliament of the United Kingdom from 1960 =

This is a list of acts of the Parliament of the United Kingdom passed in 1960.

Acts passed before 1963 are cited by the regnal year(s) in which the relevant parliamentary session was held, as opposed to the convention used for later acts of citing the calendar year. Each act passed in a respective session is given a chapter number (abbreviated "c."), denoted by Arabic numerals in the case of public general acts, lowercase Roman numerals in the case of local acts, or italicised Arabic numerals in the case of personal acts. These run as separate series.

119 acts of Parliament were passed in 1960: 66 public general acts and 53 local acts.

indicates that an act has been transcribed on Wikisource, indicates that an act is available to view at legislation.gov.uk, and indicates the location of the original act in the Parliamentary Archives.

== Public general acts ==
Short title	Citation	Royal assent
Long title
Consolidated Fund Act 1960 (repealed)	8 & 9 Eliz. 2. c. 10	22 March 1960
An Act to apply certain sums out of the Consolidated Fund to the service of the years ending on the thirty-first day of March, one thousand nine hundred and sixty and one thousand nine hundred and sixty-one. (Repealed by Statute Law Revision Act 1964 (c. 79))
Foreign Service Act 1960 (repealed)	8 & 9 Eliz. 2. c. 11	22 March 1960
An Act to amend the law as to the superannuation benefits which may be granted to or in respect of certain members of Her Majesty's foreign service. (Repealed by Superannuation Act 1965 (c. 74))
Distress for Rates Act 1960 (repealed)	8 & 9 Eliz. 2. c. 12	22 March 1960
An Act to consolidate, with corrections and improvements made under the Consolidation of Enactments (Procedure) Act, 1949, (Note: Consolidation of Enactments (Procedure) Act 1949 (12, 13 & 14 Geo. 6. c. 33)) certain enactments relating to the recovery of rates. (Repealed by General Rate Act 1967 (c. 9))
Air Corporations Act 1960 (repealed)	8 & 9 Eliz. 2. c. 13	22 March 1960
An Act to increase the borrowing powers of the British Overseas Airways Corporation and the British European Airways Corporation. (Repealed by Air Corporations Act 1962 (11 & 12 Eliz. 2. c. 5))
Cinematograph Films Act 1960 (repealed)	8 & 9 Eliz. 2. c. 14	22 March 1960
An Act to amend the Cinematograph Films Acts, 1938 (Note: Cinematograph Films Act 1938 (1 & 2 Geo. 6. c. 17)) and 1948. (Note: Cinematograph Films Act 1948 (11 & 12 Geo. 6. c. 23)) (Repealed by Films Act 1960 (8 & 9 Eliz. 2. c. 57))
Water Officers Compensation Act 1960	8 & 9 Eliz. 2. c. 15	22 March 1960
An Act to amend the law relating to compensation for officers and servants of water undertakers affected by orders under the Water Act, 1945, (Note: Water Act 1945 (8 & 9 Geo. 6. c. 42)) or by combinations or orders under the Water (Scotland) Act, 1946. (Note: Water (Scotland) Act 1946 (9 & 10 Geo. 6. c. 42))
Road Traffic Act 1960	8 & 9 Eliz. 2. c. 16	22 March 1960
An Act to consolidate, with corrections and improvements made under the Consolidation of Enactments (Procedure) Act, 1949, certain enactments relating to road traffic.
Coal Industry Act 1960 (repealed)	8 & 9 Eliz. 2. c. 17	22 March 1960
An Act to authorise further advances to the National Coal Board for capital purposes. (Repealed by Coal Industry Act 1965 (c. 82))
Local Employment Act 1960 (repealed)	8 & 9 Eliz. 2. c. 18	22 March 1960
An Act to make provision to promote employment in localities in England, Scotland and Wales where high and persistent unemployment exists or is threatened, and to make consequential provision as respects the industrial estate companies; to amend subsection (4) of section fourteen of the Town and Country Planning Act, 1947, (Note: Town and Country Planning Act 1947 (10 & 11 Geo. 6. c. 51)) and subsection (4) of section twelve of the Town and Country Planning (Scotland) Act, 1947 (Note: Town and Country Planning (Scotland) Act 1947 (10 & 11 Geo. 6. c. 53)) (industrial development certificates); and for purposes connected with the matters aforesaid. (Repealed by Statute Law (Repeals) Act 1978 (c. 45))
European Free Trade Association Act 1960 (repealed)	8 & 9 Eliz. 2. c. 19	22 March 1960
An Act to make provision for matters arising out of the establishment of the European Free Trade Association or otherwise out of agreements relating to trade made with members of the Association; and to repeal the Dyestuffs (Import Regulation) Acts, 1920 (Note: Dyestuffs (Import Regulations) Act 1920 (10 & 11 Geo. 5. c. 77)) and 1934. (Note: Dyestuffs (Import Regulation) Act 1934 (24 & 25 Geo. 5. c. 6)) (Repealed by European Communities Act 1972 (c. 68))
Requisitioned Houses Act 1960 (repealed)	8 & 9 Eliz. 2. c. 20	22 March 1960
An Act to enable the Minister of Housing and Local Government to extend the period for which possession of requisitioned houses may be retained by local authorities under the Requisitioned Houses and Housing (Amendment) Act, 1955, (Note: Requisitioned Houses and Housing (Amendment) Act 1955 (3 & 4 Eliz. 2. c. 24)) and for purposes connected therewith. (Repealed by Statute Law (Repeals) Act 1978 (c. 45))
Wages Arrestment Limitation (Amendment) (Scotland) Act 1960 (repealed)	8 & 9 Eliz. 2. c. 21	22 March 1960
An Act to increase the amount of wages excepted from arrestment under the Wages Arrestment Limitation (Scotland) Act, 1870. (Note: Wages Arrestment Limitation (Scotland) Act 1870 (33 & 34 Vict. c. 63)) (Repealed by Debtors (Scotland) Act 1987 (c. 18))
Horticulture Act 1960	8 & 9 Eliz. 2. c. 22	22 March 1960
An Act to make provision for assisting the production and marketing of horticultural produce.
First Offenders (Scotland) Act 1960 (repealed)	8 & 9 Eliz. 2. c. 23	13 April 1960
An Act to restrict the imprisonment of first offenders in Scotland. (Repealed by Criminal Procedure (Scotland) Act 1975 (c. 21))
Pawnbrokers Act 1960 (repealed)	8 & 9 Eliz. 2. c. 24	13 April 1960
An Act to amend the Pawnbrokers Acts, 1872 (Note: Pawnbrokers Act 1872 (35 & 36 Vict. c. 93)) and 1922. (Note: Pawnbrokers Act 1922 (12 & 13 Geo. 5. c. 5)) (Repealed by Consumer Credit Act 1974 (c. 39))
War Damage (Clearance Payments) Act 1960 (repealed)	8 & 9 Eliz. 2. c. 25	13 April 1960
An Act to validate payments made by the War Damage Commission before the passing of this Act in respect of the clearance of war-damaged land, and to make further provision for such payments by the Commission. (Repealed by Statute Law (Repeals) Act 1981 (c. 19))
Iron and Steel (Financial Provisions) Act 1960 (repealed)	8 & 9 Eliz. 2. c. 26	13 April 1960
An Act to authorise the payment out of the Consolidated Fund of loans to be made for capital purposes by the Minister of Power in pursuance of arrangements under section five of the Iron and Steel Act, 1953; (Note: Iron and Steel Act 1953 (1 & 2 Eliz. 2. c. 15)) and for connected purposes. (Repealed by National Loans Act 1968 (c. 13))
Gas Act 1960 (repealed)	8 & 9 Eliz. 2. c. 27	13 April 1960
An Act to increase the amount which may be borrowed by the Gas Council and Area Boards under the Gas Act, 1948, (Note: Gas Act 1948 (11 & 12 Geo. 6. c. 67)) and to amend that Act with respect to the expenses of the Minister in connection with the testing of gas for compliance with standards prescribed under that Act. (Repealed by Gas Act 1972 (c. 60))
Legal Aid Act 1960 (repealed)	8 & 9 Eliz. 2. c. 28	13 April 1960
An Act to relax the financial conditions for legal aid under Part I of the Legal Aid and Advice Act, 1949, (Note: Legal Aid and Advice Act 1949 (12, 13 & 14 Geo. 6. c. 51)) and under the Legal Aid (Scotland) Act, 1949, (Note: Legal Aid and Solicitors (Scotland) Act 1949 (12, 13 & 14 Geo. 6. c. 63)) by altering the limits on disposable income and disposable capital, and the maximum amount of the contribution to the legal aid fund, to make further provision for the remuneration of counsel and solicitors in connection with such legal aid or with applications for it, and to explain references in those Acts to payment and the like. (Repealed for Scotland by Legal Aid (Scotland) Act 1967 (c. 43) and for England and Wales by Legal Aid Act 1974 (c. 4))
Marriage (Enabling) Act 1960	8 & 9 Eliz. 2. c. 29	13 April 1960
An Act to enable a person to marry certain kin of a former spouse. (Repealed for Scotland by Marriage (Scotland) Act 1977 (c. 15))
Occupiers' Liability (Scotland) Act 1960	8 & 9 Eliz. 2. c. 30	2 June 1960
An Act to amend the law of Scotland as to the liability of occupiers and others for injury or damage occasioned to persons or property on any land or other premises by reason of the state of the premises or of anything done or omitted to be done thereon; and for purposes connected with the matter aforesaid.
Highlands and Islands Shipping Services Act 1960	8 & 9 Eliz. 2. c. 31	2 June 1960
An Act to authorise the Secretary of State to assist persons concerned with the provision of sea transport services serving the Highlands and Islands; and for purposes connected with the matter aforesaid.
Population (Statistics) Act 1960	8 & 9 Eliz. 2. c. 32	2 June 1960
An Act to make permanent the Population (Statistics) Act, 1938, (Note: Population (Statistics) Act 1938 (1 & 2 Geo. 6. c. 12)) and to make further provision as to matters with respect to which particulars may be required under that Act and as to certificates to be produced on the registration of still-births.
Indecency with Children Act 1960 (repealed)	8 & 9 Eliz. 2. c. 33	2 June 1960
An Act to make further provision for the punishment of indecent conduct towards young children, and to increase the maximum sentence of imprisonment under the Sexual Offences Act, 1956, (Note: Sexual Offences Act 1956 (4 & 5 Eliz. 2. c. 69)) for certain existing offences against young girls. (Repealed by Sexual Offences Act 2003 (c. 42))
Radioactive Substances Act 1960 (repealed)	8 & 9 Eliz. 2. c. 34	2 June 1960
An Act to regulate the keeping and use of radioactive material, and to make provision as to the disposal and accumulation of radioactive waste; and for purposes connected with the matters aforesaid. (Repealed by Radioactive Substances Act 1993 (c. 12))
International Development Association Act 1960 (repealed)	8 & 9 Eliz. 2. c. 35	2 June 1960
An Act to enable effect to be given to an international agreement for the establishment and operation of an International Development Association, and for purposes connected therewith. (Repealed by Overseas Development and Co-operation Act 1980 (c. 63))
Game Laws (Amendment) Act 1960	8 & 9 Eliz. 2. c. 36	2 June 1960
An Act to make better provision for the prevention of poaching.
Payment of Wages Act 1960 (repealed)	8 & 9 Eliz. 2. c. 37	2 June 1960
An Act to remove certain restrictions imposed by the Truck Acts, 1831 to 1940, and other enactments, with respect to the payment of wages; and for purposes connected therewith. (Repealed by Wages Act 1986 (c. 48))
Civil Aviation (Licensing) Act 1960 (repealed)	8 & 9 Eliz. 2. c. 38	2 June 1960
An Act to prohibit certain flying except under a licence or other authority and to repeal section twenty-four of the Air Corporations Act, 1949; and for purposes connected with the matters aforesaid. (Repealed by Civil Aviation Act 1971 (c. 75) and Civil Aviation Act 1982 (c. 16))
Dock Workers (Pensions) Act 1960 (repealed)	8 & 9 Eliz. 2. c. 39	2 June 1960
An Act to exclude the operation of the Truck Acts, 1831 to 1940, and the Shop Clubs Act, 1902, (Note: Shop Clubs Act 1902 (2 Edw. 7. c. 21)) in relation to provisions concerning pensions under the Dock Workers (Regulation of Employment) Act, 1946. (Note: Dock Workers (Regulation of Employment) Act 1946 (9 & 10 Geo. 6. c. 22)) (Repealed by Social Security Act 1973 (c. 38))
Commonwealth Teachers Act 1960 (repealed)	8 & 9 Eliz. 2. c. 40	2 June 1960
An Act to make further provision for matters arising out of the recommendations of the Commonwealth Education Conference. (Repealed by Overseas Development and Co-operation Act 1980 (c. 63))
Ghana (Consequential Provision) Act 1960	8 & 9 Eliz. 2. c. 41	2 June 1960
An Act to make provision as to the operation of the law in relation to Ghana and persons and things in any way belonging to or connected with Ghana, in view of Ghana's becoming a Republic while remaining a member of the Commonwealth.
Merchant Shipping (Minicoy Lighthouse) Act 1960 (repealed)	8 & 9 Eliz. 2. c. 42	2 June 1960
An Act to enable the lighthouse on Minicoy Island and sums held in the General Lighthouse Fund in connection therewith to be transferred to the Government of India, and for purposes connected with the matter aforesaid. (Repealed by Statute Law (Repeals) Act 1986 (c. 12))
Abandonment of Animals Act 1960 (repealed)	8 & 9 Eliz. 2. c. 43	2 June 1960
An Act to prohibit the abandonment of animals; and for purposes connected therewith. (Repealed for England and Wales by Animal Welfare Act 2006 (c. 45) and for Scotland by Animal Health and Welfare (Scotland) Act 2006 (asp 11))
Finance Act 1960	8 & 9 Eliz. 2. c. 44	29 July 1960
An Act to grant certain duties, to alter other duties, and to amend the law relating to the National Debt and the Public Revenue, and to make further provision in connection with Finance.
Appropriation Act 1960 (repealed)	8 & 9 Eliz. 2. c. 45	29 July 1960
An Act to apply a sum out of the Consolidated Fund to the service of the year ending on the thirty-first day of March, one thousand nine hundred and sixty-one, and to appropriate the supplies granted in this Session of Parliament. (Repealed by Statute Law Revision Act 1964 (c. 79))
Corporate Bodies' Contracts Act 1960	8 & 9 Eliz. 2. c. 46	29 July 1960
An Act to amend the law governing the making of contracts by or on behalf of bodies corporate; and for connected purposes.
Offices Act 1960 (repealed)	8 & 9 Eliz. 2. c. 47	29 July 1960
An Act to make further and better provisions for health, welfare and safety in offices; and for purposes connected therewith. (Repealed by Offices, Shops and Railway Premises Act 1963 (c. 41))
Matrimonial Proceedings (Magistrates' Courts) Act 1960 (repealed)	8 & 9 Eliz. 2. c. 48	29 July 1960
An Act to amend and consolidate certain enactments relating to matrimonial proceedings in magistrates' courts and to make in the case of other proceedings the same amendments as to the maximum weekly rate of the maintenance payments which may be ordered by a magistrates' court as are made in the case of matrimonial proceedings. (Repealed by Domestic Proceedings and Magistrates' Courts Act 1978 (c. 22))
Public Health Laboratory Service Act 1960 (repealed)	8 & 9 Eliz. 2. c. 49	29 July 1960
An Act to establish a Public Health Laboratory Service Board for the exercise of functions with respect to the administration of the bacteriological service provided by the Minister of Health under section seventeen of the National Health Service Act, 1946. (Note: National Health Service Act 1946 (9 & 10 Geo. 6. c. 81)) (Repealed by National Health Service Act 1977 (c. 49))
House of Commons Members' Fund Act 1960 (repealed)	8 & 9 Eliz. 2. c. 50	29 July 1960
An Act to extend the powers of investment of the trustees of the House of Commons Members' Fund. (Repealed by House of Commons Members' Fund Act 1962 (10 & 11 Eliz. 2. c. 53))
Road Traffic (Amendment) Act 1960 (repealed)	8 & 9 Eliz. 2. c. 51	29 July 1960
An Act to make provision with respect to the grant of licences to drive motor vehicles to persons who have held licences to drive such vehicles in Northern Ireland, the Isle of Man or any of the Channel Islands. (Repealed by Road Traffic Act 1972 (c. 20))
Cyprus Act 1960	8 & 9 Eliz. 2. c. 52	29 July 1960
An Act to make provision for, and in connection with, the establishment of an independent republic in Cyprus.
Oil Burners (Standards) Act 1960 (repealed)	8 & 9 Eliz. 2. c. 53	29 July 1960
An Act to make provision for minimum standards of efficiency and safety in respect of oil-burning appliances; and for purposes connected therewith. (Repealed by Consumer Protection Act 1961 (9 & 10 Eliz. 2. c. 40))
Clean Rivers (Estuaries and Tidal Waters) Act 1960 (repealed)	8 & 9 Eliz. 2. c. 54	29 July 1960
An Act to amend the Rivers (Prevention of Pollution) Act, 1951, (Note: Rivers (Prevention of Pollution) Act 1951 (14 & 15 Geo. 6. c. 64)) so as to give to river boards powers to deal with new outlets and new discharges of trade or sewage effluent into tidal waters or parts of the sea. (Repealed by Control of Pollution Act 1974 (c. 40))
Nigeria Independence Act 1960	8 & 9 Eliz. 2. c. 55	29 July 1960
An Act to make provision for, and in connection with, the attainment by Nigeria of fully responsible status within the Commonwealth.
Statute Law Revision Act 1960	8 & 9 Eliz. 2. c. 56	29 July 1960
An Act to revise the statute law by repealing obsolete, spent or unnecessary enactments.
Films Act 1960 (repealed)	8 & 9 Eliz. 2. c. 57	29 July 1960
An Act to consolidate the Cinematograph Films Acts, 1938 to 1960. (Repealed by Films Act 1985 (c. 21))
Charities Act 1960 (repealed)	8 & 9 Eliz. 2. c. 58	29 July 1960
An Act to replace with new provisions the Charitable Trusts Acts, 1853 to 1939, and other enactments relating to charities, to repeal the mortmain Acts, to make further provision as to the powers exercisable by or with respect to charities or with respect to gifts to charity, and for purposes connected therewith. (Repealed by Charities Act 1993 (c. 10) and Charities Act 2006 (c. 50))
Adoption Act 1960 (repealed)	8 & 9 Eliz. 2. c. 59	29 July 1960
An Act to amend the law with respect to the revocation of adoption orders in cases of legitimation, and to make further provision in connection with the revocation of such orders under section twenty-six of the Adoption Act, 1958. (Note: Adoption Act 1958 (7 & 8 Eliz. 2. c. 5)) (Repealed for England and Wales by Adoption Act 1976 (c. 36) and for Scotland by Adoption (Scotland) Act 1978 (c. 28))
Betting and Gaming Act 1960 (repealed)	8 & 9 Eliz. 2. c. 60	29 July 1960
An Act to amend the law with respect to betting and gaming and to make certain other amendments with a view to securing consistency and uniformity in, and facilitating the consolidation of, the said law and the law with respect to lotteries; and for purposes connected with the matters aforesaid. (Repealed by Betting, Gaming and Lotteries Act 1963 (c. 2) and Betting Duties Act 1963 (c. 3))
Mental Health (Scotland) Act 1960 (repealed)	8 & 9 Eliz. 2. c. 61	29 July 1960
An Act to repeal the Lunacy (Scotland) Acts, 1857 to 1913, and the Mental Deficiency (Scotland) Acts, 1913 (Note: Mental Deficiency and Lunacy (Scotland) Act 1913 (3 & 4 Geo. 5. c. 38)) and 1940; (Note: Mental Deficiency (Scotland) Act 1940 (3 & 4 Geo. 6. c. 8)) to make fresh provision with respect to the reception, care and treatment of persons suffering, or appearing to be suffering, from mental disorder, and with respect to their property and affairs; and for purposes connected with the matters aforesaid. (Repealed by Mental Health (Scotland) Act 1984 (c. 36))
Caravan Sites and Control of Development Act 1960	8 & 9 Eliz. 2. c. 62	29 July 1960
An Act to make further provision for the licensing and control of caravan sites, to authorise local authorities to provide and operate caravan sites, to amend the law relating to enforcement notices and certain other notices issued under Part III of the Town and Country Planning Act, 1947, to amend sections twenty-six and one hundred and three of that Act and to explain other provisions in the said Part III; and for connected purposes.
Road Traffic and Roads Improvement Act 1960 (repealed)	8 & 9 Eliz. 2. c. 63	29 July 1960
An Act to facilitate the enforcement and administration of the law relating to road traffic and to vehicles on roads by providing for the punishment without a prosecution of offences in connection with lights or reflectors on vehicles, or with obstruction, waiting, parking and kindred matters, and for the employment of traffic wardens in aid of the police; to amend the law with respect to parking places, the regulation of traffic and the costs of removing and storing vehicles and to provide for the disposal of abandoned vehicles; to make temporary amendments of the law relating to highways in the metropolitan police district and the City of London; to make provision as to the effect of regulations made or having effect as if made under section sixty-four of the Road Traffic Act, 1960; (Note: Road Traffic Act 1960 (8 & 9 Eliz. 2. c. 16)) and for purposes connected with or arising out of the matters aforesaid. (Repealed by Statute Law (Repeals) Act 1989 (c. 43))
Building Societies Act 1960 (repealed)	8 & 9 Eliz. 2. c. 64	29 July 1960
An Act to amend the law relating to building societies. (Repealed by Building Societies Act 1962 (10 & 11 Eliz. 2. c. 37), Statute Law (Repeals) Act 1969 (c. 52), Northern Ireland Constitution Act 1973 (c. 36) and Building Societies Act 1986 (c. 53))
Administration of Justice Act 1960	8 & 9 Eliz. 2. c. 65	27 October 1960
An Act to make further provision for appeals to the House of Lords in criminal cases; to amend the law relating to contempt of court, habeas corpus and certiorari; and for purposes connected with the matters aforesaid.
Professions Supplementary to Medicine Act 1960 (repealed)	8 & 9 Eliz. 2. c. 66	27 October 1960
An Act to provide for the establishment of a Council, boards and disciplinary committees for certain professions supplementary to medicine; to provide for the registration of members of those professions, for regulating their professional education and professional conduct and for cancelling registration in cases of misconduct; and for purposes connected with the matters aforesaid. (Repealed by Health Act 1999 (c. 8) and Health Professions Order 2001 (SI 2002/254))
Public Bodies (Admission to Meetings) Act 1960	8 & 9 Eliz. 2. c. 67	27 October 1960
An Act to provide for the admission of representatives of the press and other members of the public to the meetings of certain bodies exercising public functions.
Noise Abatement Act 1960 (repealed)	8 & 9 Eliz. 2. c. 68	27 October 1960
An Act to make new provisions in respect of the control of noise and vibration with a view to their abatement. (Repealed by Control of Pollution Act 1974 (c. 40))
Road Traffic (Driving of Motor Cycles) Act 1960 (repealed)	8 & 9 Eliz. 2. c. 69	27 October 1960
An Act to amend the provisions of the Road Traffic Act, 1960, relating to the ages at which and the conditions subject to which persons may drive motor cycles and may obtain licences for that purpose. (Repealed by Road Traffic Act 1972 (c. 20))
Indus Basin Development Fund Act 1960 (repealed)	9 & 10 Eliz. 2. c. 1	20 December 1960
An Act to provide for United Kingdom contributions towards the cost of certain works for the Indus river basin. (Repealed by Statute Law (Repeals) Act 1977 (c. 18))
British North America Act 1960	9 & 10 Eliz. 2. c. 2	20 December 1960
An Act to amend the British North America Act, 1867. (Note: British North America Act 1867 (30 & 31 Vict. c. 3))
Administration of Justice (Judges and Pensions) Act 1960 (repealed)	9 & 10 Eliz. 2. c. 3	20 December 1960
An Act to provide for the appointment of additional judges of the High Court and Court of Appeal; and to make further provision with respect to the pensions of certain judicial officers. (Repealed by Senior Courts Act 1981 (c. 54))
Expiring Laws Continuance Act 1960 (repealed)	9 & 10 Eliz. 2. c. 4	20 December 1960
An Act to continue certain expiring laws. (Repealed by Statute Law Revision Act 1963 (c. 30))
National Insurance Act 1960 (repealed)	9 & 10 Eliz. 2. c. 5	20 December 1960
An Act to amend the rates or amounts of contributions and benefits under the National Insurance (Industrial Injuries) Acts, 1946 to 1959, and the National Insurance Acts, 1946 to 1959, not being graduated contributions or graduated retirement benefit; to modify the provisions of the National Insurance Act, 1946, (Note: National Insurance Act 1946 (9 & 10 Geo. 6. c. 67)) under which persons are treated as having retired; and for purposes connected with the matters aforesaid. (Repealed by Statute Law Revision (Consequential Repeals) Act 1965 (c. 55))
Ministers of the Crown (Parliamentary Secretaries) Act 1960	9 & 10 Eliz. 2. c. 6	20 December 1960
An Act to replace the existing limits on the numbers of Parliamentary Secretaries in individual departments by a single aggregate limit; to authorise the payment of a salary to a Parliamentary Secretary to the Minister for Science; and to increase the salary of the Captain of the Gentlemen-at-Arms.

== Local acts ==
Short title	Citation	Royal assent
Long title
Glasgow Corporation Consolidation (General Powers) Order Confirmation Act 1960	8 & 9 Eliz. 2. c. iii	13 April 1960
An Act to confirm a Provisional Order under the Private Legislation Procedure (Scotland) Act 1936 (Note: Private Legislation Procedure (Scotland) Act 1936 (26 Geo. 5 & 1 Edw. 8. c. 52)) relating to Glasgow Corporation.
	Glasgow Corporation Consolidation (General Powers) Order 1960 Provisional Order to consolidate with amendments the Acts and Orders of or relating to the Corporation of the city of Glasgow with respect to cleansing lighting control of traffic licensing and registration public health establishments for massage and special treatment farmed-out houses and offences and penalties and to confer further powers on the Corporation with respect thereto and to make further provision for the local government health and improvement of the city and for other purposes.	
Bromley College and other Charities Scheme Confirmation Act 1960	8 & 9 Eliz. 2. c. iv	2 June 1960
An Act to confirm a Scheme of the Charity Commissioners for the application or management of Bromley College and other Charities, at Bromley, in the County of Kent.
	Scheme for the Application or Management of the following Charities, at Bromley, in the County of Kent: 1. The Charity known as Bromley College, founded by will of The Right Reverend John Warner, Bishop of Rochester, proved in the Prerogative Court of Canterbury on the 7th February 1667, and also comprised in the following instruments:—; 1. Act of Parliament 22 Car. II cap. 2 (Private); (Note: Bishop of Rochester's Charities Act 1670 (22 Cha. 2 c. 2 Pr.)); 2. Decree made on the 28th March 1693 by the Commissioners by virtue of a Commission dated the 3rd November 1692 awarded under the great seal according to the Act of Parliament 43 Eliz. cap. 4; (Note: Charitable Uses Act 1601 (43 Eliz. 1. c. 4)); 3. Scheme of the Charity Commissioners of the 6th July 1923; and the subsidiary Charities thereof namely the Charities of Sir Orlando Bridgeman and Sir Philip Warwick, The Reverend William Hetherington, Lady Gower, The Right Reverend Zachary Pearce, Bishop of Rochester, Mrs. Betterson, William Pearce, The Right Reverend Walter King, Bishop of Rochester, Mrs. Rose, and Catherine Emma Crew Beynon; 2. The Charity called Sheppard's Charity (otherwise Sheppard's College), comprised in a declaration of trust dated the 29th February 1844, and the subsidiary Charities thereof namely:—; 1. (a) The Charity known as Hannah Finnie's Benefaction, founded by will of Hannah Finnie proved at London on the 6th June 1905; 2. (b) The Charity of Lucy Haslewood, founded by will proved in the Principal Registry on the 21st July 1910; 3. (c) The Charity of the Revered Henry Aldwin Soames, founded by will proved in the Principal Registry on the 29th August 1921; 4. (d) The Charity of Louisa Ann Lacey, founded by will proved in the Principal Registry on the 27th March 1925; and; 5. (e) The Charity of Elizabeth Hope Lacey, founded by will proved in the Principal Registry on the 14th January 1938.; 3. The Charity of James Edward Newell, founded by will proved in the Principal Registry on the 16th March 1880; 4. The Charity called The Holland Fund, founded by the will of Maud Elizabeth Holland proved in the Principal Registry on the 13th November 1957.	
Chipping Sodbury Town Trust Scheme Confirmation Act 1960	8 & 9 Eliz. 2. c. v	2 June 1960
An Act to confirm a Scheme of the Charity Commissioners for the application or management of the Chipping Sodbury Town Trust.
	Scheme for the application or management of the following Charity:—: 1. The Charity called the Chipping Sodbury Town Trust, in the Ancient Parish of Chipping Sodbury, in the County of Gloucester, regulated by a Scheme of the Charity Commissioners of the 27th January 1899 as varied by Schemes of the said Commissioners of the 13th December 1910 and the 27th October 1922 and as affected by an Order made by the said Commissioners on the 23rd June 1950 under the County of Gloucester (Parish of Sodbury) Order, 1945, as confirmed by the County of Gloucester (Sodbury Parish) Confirmation Order, 1945.	
United Charities of Nathaniel Waterhouse, and other Charities (Halifax) Scheme Confirmation Act 1960	8 & 9 Eliz. 2. c. vi	2 June 1960
An Act to confirm a Scheme of the Charity Commissioners and the Minister of Education for the application or management of the United Charities of Nathaniel Waterhouse, and other Charities, in the County Borough of Halifax.
	Scheme for the application or management of the following Charities and Foundation, in the County Borough of Halifax:—: 1. The United Charities of Nathaniel Waterhouse, regulated by an Act of Parliament (11 and 12 Vict. c. 10) (Note: United Charities of Nathaniel Waterhouse (Halifax) Act 1848 (11 & 12 Vict. c. 10 Pr.)) as affected by an Order made by the Charity Commissioners on the 29th April 1904 under the Board of Education Act, 1899, (Note: Board of Education Act 1899 (62 & 63 Vict. c. 33)) s. 2(2); 2. The Charity known as the Afternoon Lecturer's Fund; 3. The Waterhouse Educational Foundation, constituted by the above-mentioned Order of the Charity Commissioners of the 29th April 1904.	
Scottish American Investment Company Limited Order Confirmation Act 1960	8 & 9 Eliz. 2. c. vii	2 June 1960
An Act to confirm a Provisional Order under the Private Legislation Procedure (Scotland) Act 1936 relating to the Scottish American Investment Company Limited.
	Scottish American Investment Company Limited Order 1960 Provisional Order to repeal the Scottish American Investment Company Limited Act 1900 (Note: Scottish American Investment Company Limited Act 1900 (63 & 64 Vict. c. lxxv)) and for purposes connected therewith.	
Northampton County Council Act 1960	8 & 9 Eliz. 2. c. viii	2 June 1960
An Act to confer further powers on the Northampton County Council in relation to the superannuation fund maintained by the Council and for other purposes.
Saint Martin's Parish Church Birmingham Act 1960	8 & 9 Eliz. 2. c. ix	2 June 1960
An Act to confirm the removal of human remains from the churchyard of Saint Martin's Parish Church Birmingham and the erection thereon of a vestry hall and social centre to authorise the erection thereon of another building and the granting of leases of that building and for other purposes.
London and Surrey (River Wandle and River Graveney) (Jurisdiction) Act 1960	8 & 9 Eliz. 2. c. x	2 June 1960
An Act to modify and define the respective jurisdictions of the London County Council and the Surrey County Council in relation to the river Wandle and the river Graveney and for purposes connected therewith.
Derbyshire County Council Act 1960 (repealed)	8 & 9 Eliz. 2. c. xi	2 June 1960
An Act to confer further powers on the Derbyshire County Council in relation to their superannuation fund and for other purposes. (Repealed by Derbyshire Act 1981 (c. xxxiv))
Cornwall County Council Act 1960 (repealed)	8 & 9 Eliz. 2. c. xii	2 June 1960
An Act to confer further powers on the Cornwall County Council with respect to superannuation and finance and for other purposes. (Repealed by Cornwall County Council Act 1984 (c. xix))
Saint Peter Upper Thames Street Churchyard Act 1960	8 & 9 Eliz. 2. c. xiii	2 June 1960
An Act to authorise the sale of the churchyard appurtenant to the former church of Saint Peter Upper Thames Street otherwise Paul's Wharf in the city of London to authorise the erection of buildings thereon and for other purposes.
Bala to Trawsfynydd Highways (Liverpool Corporation Contribution) Act 1960 (repealed)	8 & 9 Eliz. 2. c. xiv	2 June 1960
An Act to authorise the lord mayor aldermen and citizens of the city of Liverpool to make a contribution in respect of certain highway improvements in the county of Merioneth and for other purposes. (Repealed by County of Merseyside Act 1980 (c. x))
Royal Exchange Assurance Act 1960	8 & 9 Eliz. 2. c. xv	2 June 1960
An Act to amend the royal charters and enactments relating to the Royal Exchange Assurance.
Saint Peter's Church Nottingham (Broad Marsh Burial Ground) Act 1960	8 & 9 Eliz. 2. c. xvi	2 June 1960
An Act to provide for the removal of the restrictions attaching to the Broad Marsh Burial Ground in the united benefice of Saint Peter with Saint James in the city of Nottingham to authorise the sale of the said burial ground and its use for building or otherwise and for other purposes.
Royal College of Physicians of London Act 1960	8 & 9 Eliz. 2. c. xvii	2 June 1960
An Act to confer further powers on the Royal College of Physicians of London to confirm the name of the College and for other purposes.
Saint Stephen Bristol (Burial Grounds etc.) Act 1960	8 & 9 Eliz. 2. c. xviii	2 June 1960
An Act to authorise the sale of certain disused burial grounds attaching to the former parish of Saint Nicholas with Saint Leonard Bristol and the erection of buildings thereon to provide for the application of the proceeds of sale thereof and for other purposes.
Edinburgh Merchant Company Order Confirmation Act 1960 (repealed)	8 & 9 Eliz. 2. c. xix	29 July 1960
An Act to confirm a Provisional Order under the Private Legislation Procedure (Scotland) Act, 1936, relating to the Edinburgh Merchant Company. (Repealed by Edinburgh Merchant Company Order Confirmation Act 1996 (c. xi))
	Edinburgh Merchant Company Order 1960 Provisional Order to reincorporate the Company of Merchants of the City of Edinburgh and to consolidate with amendments the Act (Note: Edinburgh Merchant Company Act 1898 (61 & 62 Vict. c. xxii)) and Orders of and relating to the said Company and to the widows' fund and endowments trust of the Company to constitute and confer powers on the Master's court of the Company and to vest in the said Master's court the Alexander Darling Silk Mercer's fund and to make provision as to the management and administration thereof to make provision as to the vesting in the said endowments trust of the Sir William Fraser Homes and the Russell and Foster Endowment and to confer powers on the said endowments trust with respect thereto and for other purposes.	
Glasgow Corporation Order Confirmation Act 1960	8 & 9 Eliz. 2. c. xx	29 July 1960
An Act to confirm a Provisional Order under the Private Legislation Procedure (Scotland) Act 1936 relating to Glasgow Corporation.
	Glasgow Corporation Order 1960 Provisional Order to authorise the Corporation of the city of Glasgow to acquire land and construct a new sewer; to authorise the said Corporation to borrow further moneys for the purposes of their tramway undertaking; to enact provisions for facilitating the recovery by the said Corporation of expenditure incurred by them in the demolition of property condemned under the Housing (Scotland) Act 1950 and for other purposes.	
Pier and Harbour Order (Fowey) Confirmation Act 1960	8 & 9 Eliz. 2. c. xxi	29 July 1960
An Act to confirm a Provisional Order made by the Minister of Transport under the General Pier and Harbour Act, 1861, (Note: General Pier and Harbour Act 1861 (24 & 25 Vict. c. 45)) relating to Fowey.
	Fowey Harbour Order 1960 Provisional Order to authorise the Fowey Harbour Commissioners to form and maintain a replacement reserve fund to increase the total sum which may stand to the credit of their contingency fund and for other purposes.	
Pier and Harbour Order (Yarmouth (Isle of Wight)) Confirmation Act 1960	8 & 9 Eliz. 2. c. xxii	29 July 1960
An Act to confirm a Provisional Order made by the Minister of Transport under the General Pier and Harbour Act, 1861, relating to Yarmouth (Isle of Wight).
	Yarmouth (Isle of Wight) Pier and Harbour Order 1960 Provisional Order to amend the Yarmouth (Isle of Wight) Pier and Harbour Order, 1931.	
Methodist Church Funds Act 1960	8 & 9 Eliz. 2. c. xxiii	29 July 1960
An Act to make better provision for the investment of certain funds of or connected with the work of the Methodist Church in Great Britain the Channel Islands and the Isle of Man and of its overseas missions funds and to constitute and incorporate a central finance board of the Methodist Church and for other purposes.
Mexborough and Swinton Traction Act 1960	8 & 9 Eliz. 2. c. xxiv	29 July 1960
An Act to authorise the Mexborough and Swinton Traction Company Limited to discontinue the services of trolley vehicles authorised by the Mexborough and Swinton Traction Acts and Orders 1902 to 1947 and for other purposes.
Brighton Corporation Act 1960 (repealed)	8 & 9 Eliz. 2. c. xxv	29 July 1960
An Act to confer further powers on the mayor aldermen and burgesses of the county borough of Brighton to make further provision with respect to the health local government improvement and finances of the borough and for other purposes. (Repealed by East Sussex Act 1981 (c. xxv))
University of Bristol Act 1960	8 & 9 Eliz. 2. c. xxvi	29 July 1960
An Act to provide for the pooling of investments and moneys of certain endowment funds of the University of Bristol and for other purposes.
Somerset County Council Act 1960	8 & 9 Eliz. 2. c. xxvii	29 July 1960
An Act to confer further powers on the Somerset County Council and in certain cases on the local authorities in the county of Somerset in relation to highways and the local government and improvement of the county to enact provisions with respect to finance and superannuation and for other purposes.
Bude-Stratton Urban District Council Act 1960	8 & 9 Eliz. 2. c. xxviii	29 July 1960
An Act to empower the urban district council of Bude-Stratton to dispose of portions of the Bude Canal discontinued as a navigation to authorise the closing for navigation of a further portion of the said canal and for other purposes.
London County Council (General Powers) Act 1960	8 & 9 Eliz. 2. c. xxix	29 July 1960
An Act to confer further powers upon the London County Council and other authorities and for other purposes.
City of London (Guild Churches) Act 1960	8 & 9 Eliz. 2. c. xxx	29 July 1960
An Act to confer further powers upon the Bishop of London with respect to guild churches in the city of London to amend the City of London (Guild Churches) Act 1952 and for other purposes.
Essex County Council (Fullbridge, Maldon) Act 1960 (repealed)	8 & 9 Eliz. 2. c. xxxi	29 July 1960
An Act to authorise the county council of Essex in reconstructing Fullbridge in the borough of Maldon over the river Chelmer to reduce the headway under the existing bridge and for other purposes. (Repealed by Essex Act 1987 (c. xx))
Presbyterian Church of England Act 1960	8 & 9 Eliz. 2. c. xxxii	29 July 1960
An Act to make provision as to the property held by or on behalf of the Presbyterian Church of England to confer further powers of investment on the Presbyterian Church of England Trust and for purposes connected therewith.
Lancashire County Council (Industrial Development etc.) Act 1960 (repealed)	8 & 9 Eliz. 2. c. xxxiii	29 July 1960
An Act to confer further powers on the county council of the administrative county of the county palatine of Lancaster in relation to the industrial development of lands within the county and the local government and improvement of the county to make further provision in relation to the superannuation fund of the county council and for other purposes. (Repealed by County of Lancashire Act 1984 (c. xxi))
Canterbury and District Water Act 1960	8 & 9 Eliz. 2. c. xxxiv	29 July 1960
An Act to apply to the Canterbury and District Water Company certain provisions of the Third Schedule to the Water Act 1945 (Note: Water Act 1945 (8 & 9 Geo. 6. c. 42)) to make provision as to the rates and charges the Company are authorised to levy to authorise the raising of further capital and for other purposes.
London County Council (Money) Act 1960	8 & 9 Eliz. 2. c. xxxv	29 July 1960
An Act to regulate the expenditure on capital account and lending of money by the London County Council during the financial period from the first day of April nineteen hundred and sixty to the thirtieth day of September nineteen hundred and sixty-one and for other purposes.
City of London (Various Powers) Act 1960	8 & 9 Eliz. 2. c. xxxvi	29 July 1960
An Act to authorise the Corporation of London to acquire land for the purposes of Spitalfields Market to transfer Bunhill Fields Burial Ground to the Corporation and to make provision for the improvement thereof to make provision with respect to parking accommodation swimming baths smoke abatement and finance and for other purposes.
Derby Corporation Act 1960 (repealed)	8 & 9 Eliz. 2. c. xxxvii	29 July 1960
An Act to confer further powers on the mayor aldermen and burgesses of the borough of Derby in relation to the superannuation fund maintained by the council of the borough and for other purposes. (Repealed by Derbyshire Act 1981 (c. xxxiv))
Hastings Pier Act 1960 (repealed)	8 & 9 Eliz. 2. c. xxxviii	29 July 1960
An Act to increase the powers of the Hastings Pier Company and for other purposes. (Repealed by Hastings Pier Act 1985 (c. xxxiii))
Tyne Tunnel Act 1960	8 & 9 Eliz. 2. c. xxxix	29 July 1960
An Act to authorise variations of the works authorised by the Tyne Tunnel Acts 1946 (Note: Tyne Tunnel Act 1946 (9 & 10 Geo. 6. c. xl)) and 1956 (Note: Tyne Tunnel Act 1956 (4 & 5 Eliz. 2. c. lxvi)) including the construction of new works to amend those Acts in certain respects to confer further powers in connection with those works including the taking of tolls and for other purposes.
Croydon Corporation Act 1960	8 & 9 Eliz. 2. c. xl	29 July 1960
An Act to consolidate with amendments numerous enactments in force in the county borough of Croydon to make further provision for the health local government and improvement of the borough to confer further powers upon the mayor aldermen and burgesses of the borough and for other purposes.
Newcastle upon Tyne Corporation Act 1960	8 & 9 Eliz. 2. c. xli	29 July 1960
An Act to confer further powers upon the lord mayor aldermen and citizens of the city and county of Newcastle upon Tyne and the stewards and wardens committee of the Town Moor in the city in relation to the Town Moor to confer further powers upon the Corporation in relation to the local government health improvement and finances of the city and for other purposes.
Southampton Corporation Act 1960	8 & 9 Eliz. 2. c. xlii	29 July 1960
An Act to empower the mayor aldermen and burgesses of the borough of Southampton to construct a bridge across the river Itchen and other street works in the borough to make further provision with reference to the lands and the improvement health local government and finances of the borough and for other purposes.
Bournemouth Corporation Act 1960 (repealed)	8 & 9 Eliz. 2. c. xliii	29 July 1960
An Act to confer further powers upon the mayor aldermen and burgesses of the borough of Bournemouth to make further provision for the improvement health local government and finances of the borough and for other purposes. (Repealed by Bournemouth Borough Council Act 1985 (c. v))
Southend-on-Sea Corporation Act 1960 (repealed)	8 & 9 Eliz. 2. c. xliv	29 July 1960
An Act to confer further powers upon the mayor aldermen and burgesses of the borough of Southend-on-Sea to make further provision for the improvement health local government and finances of the borough and for other purposes. (Repealed by Essex Act 1987 (c. xx))
Manchester Ship Canal Act 1960	8 & 9 Eliz. 2. c. xlv	29 July 1960
An Act to confer further powers upon the Manchester Ship Canal Company and for other purposes.
Salford Corporation Act 1960	8 & 9 Eliz. 2. c. xlvi	29 July 1960
An Act to confer further powers on the mayor aldermen and citizens of the city of Salford and to make further and better provisions for the health local government improvement and finances of the city and for other purposes.
British Transport Commission Act 1960	8 & 9 Eliz. 2. c. xlvii	29 July 1960
An Act to empower the British Transport Commission to construct works and to acquire lands to confirm an agreement between the Commission and the National Trust for Places of Historic Interest or Natural Beauty relating to the Stratford-on-Avon Canal to extend the period during which legal proceedings in respect of the River Kennet Navigation and the Kennet and Avon Canal are restricted to authorise the closing for navigation of portions of certain canals to extend the time for the compulsory purchase of certain lands to confer further powers on the Commission and for other purposes.
Blackfriars Bridgehead Improvements Act 1960	8 & 9 Eliz. 2. c. xlviii	29 July 1960
An Act to authorise the Corporation of London to purchase lands compulsorily to construct a river wall and street works and for other purposes.
Hertfordshire County Council Act 1960	8 & 9 Eliz. 2. c. xlix	29 July 1960
An Act to confer further powers on the Hertfordshire County Council and on local authorities in the administrative county of Hertford in relation to lands and highways and the local government improvement health and finances of the county and for other purposes.
Bristol Corporation Act 1960	8 & 9 Eliz. 2. c. l	29 July 1960
An Act to authorise the lord mayor aldermen and burgesses of the city of Bristol to execute works and acquire lands to confer further powers upon the Corporation and to make further and better provision for the health improvement local government and finances of the city and for other purposes.
Gloucester and Sharpness Canal (Water) Act 1960	8 & 9 Eliz. 2. c. li	29 July 1960
An Act to confer further powers on the Bristol Waterworks Company and the British Transport Commission in relation to the supply of water from the Gloucester and Sharpness Canal and for other purposes.
Oldham Corporation Act 1960	8 & 9 Eliz. 2. c. lii	29 July 1960
An Act to confer further powers upon the mayor aldermen and burgesses of the county borough of Oldham with reference to lands to make further provision with regard to the water and markets undertakings of the Corporation and for the local government health improvement and finances of the borough to authorise the redemption of gas and water annuities to enact provisions with reference to public entertainments and the welfare of the inhabitants of the borough and for other purposes.
Aberdeen Harbour Order Confirmation Act 1960	9 & 10 Eliz. 2. c. i	20 December 1960
An Act to confirm a Provisional Order under the Private Legislation Procedure (Scotland) Act 1936 relating to Aberdeen Harbour.
	Aberdeen Harbour Order 1960 Provisional Order to incorporate the Aberdeen Harbour Board and to transfer to and vest therein the harbour undertaking of the Aberdeen Harbour Commissioners and to determine and regulate the administration of the port and harbour of Aberdeen and for the purposes connected therewith.	
Clyde Navigation Order Confirmation Act 1960	9 & 10 Eliz. 2. c. ii	20 December 1960
An Act to confirm a Provisional Order under the Private Legislation Procedure (Scotland) Act 1936 relating to Clyde Navigation.
	Clyde Navigation Order 1960 Provisional Order to amend the provisions of the Clyde Navigation Acts 1929 to 1959 relating to rates and for other purposes.	
Forth Road Bridge Order Confirmation Act 1960	9 & 10 Eliz. 2. c. iii	20 December 1960
An Act to confirm a Provisional Order under the Private Legislation Procedure (Scotland) Act 1936 relating to the Forth Road Bridge.
	Forth Road Bridge Order 1960 Provisional Order to confer further powers on the Forth Road Bridge Joint Board and to enact further provisions with respect to certain of the works authorised by the Forth Road Bridge Orders 1947 to 1958 to make provision as to the acquisition and utilisation of lands by the said Board and for other purposes.	

== Sources ==
- The Journals of the House of Commons (PDF). Vol. 215 (October 1959 – October 1960). pp. 3–342 – via parliament.uk.
- Chronological Table of the Statutes: Covering the Period from 1235 to the End of 1971. London: Her Majesty's Stationery Office. 1972. pp. 1172–1188. ISBN 978-0-11-840096-1 – via Google Books.
- "UK Public General Acts from 1960". legislation.gov.uk. The National Archives.
- "UK Local Acts from 1960". legislation.gov.uk. The National Archives.

== See also ==
- List of acts of the Parliament of the United Kingdom
