= Adoption Act =

Adoption Act may refer to the short titles of several Acts of Parliament relating to adoption:

- Adoption Act 1958 (7 & 8 Eliz. 2. c. 5)
- Adoption Act 1960 (8 & 9 Eliz. 2. c. 59)
- Adoption Act 1964 (c. 57)
- Adoption Act 1968 (c. 53)
- Adoption Act 1976 (c. 36)
