= Law Reform (Parent and Child) (Scotland) Act 1986 =

Act of the Parliament of the United Kingdom

Law Reform (Parent and Child) (Scotland) Act 1986 (Note: Section 11(1).)
- Act of Parliament
- Parliament of the United Kingdom
- Long title: An Act to make fresh provision in the law of Scotland with respect to the consequences of birth out of wedlock, the rights and duties of parents, the determination of parentage and the taking of blood samples in relation to the determination of parentage; to amend the law as to guardianship; and for connected purposes.
- Citation: 1986 c. 9
- Territorial extent: Scotland (Note: Section 11(4).)

Dates
- Royal assent: 26 March 1986
- Commencement: 8 December 1986 (Note: Section 11(2). The Law Reform (Parent and Child) (Scotland) Act 1986 (Commencement) Order 1986 (SI 1986/1983).)

Other legislation
- Amends: See § Repealed enactments
- Repeals/revokes: See § Repealed enactments
- Amended by: Social Security Act 1986; Civil Evidence (Scotland) Act 1988; Court of Session Act 1988; Law Reform (Miscellaneous Provisions) (Scotland) Act 1990; Age of Legal Capacity (Scotland) Act 1991; Child Support Appeals (Jurisdiction of Courts) Order 1993; Children (Scotland) Act 1995; Child Support Appeals (Jurisdiction of Courts) (Scotland) Order 2003; Family Law (Scotland) Act 2006; Registration Services (Consequential Provisions) (Scotland) Order 2006; Adoption and Children (Scotland) Act 2007; Adult Support and Protection (Scotland) Act 2007; Damages (Scotland) Act 2011; Civil Partnership (Scotland) Act 2020

Status: Amended

Text of statute as originally enacted

Revised text of statute as amended

Text of the Law Reform (Parent and Child) (Scotland) Act 1986 as in force today (including any amendments) within the United Kingdom, from legislation.gov.uk.

The Law Reform (Parent and Child) (Scotland) Act 1986 (c. 9) is an act of the Parliament of the United Kingdom that made fresh provision in the law of Scotland with respect to the consequences of birth out of wedlock, the rights and duties of parents, and the determination of parentage, and amended the law as to guardianship.

== Provisions ==
=== Repealed enactments ===
Section 10(2) of the act repealed 22 enactments, listed in schedule 2 to the act.

Enactments repealed by section 10(2)
Citation	Short title	Extent of repeal
11 Geo. 4 & 1 Will. 4. c. 69	Court of Session Act 1830	In section 33, the words "and all actions of declarator of legitimacy and of bastardy,".
6 & 7 Will. 4. c. 22	Bastards (Scotland) Act 1836	The whole act.
49 & 50 Vict. c. 27	Guardianship of Infants Act 1886	The whole act.
7 Edw. 7. c. 51	Sheriff Courts (Scotland) Act 1907	In section 5, in paragraph (1), the words from "and" to "individuals", paragraph (1A) and, in paragraph (2), the words from "and actions" to the end.
15 & 16 Geo. 5. c. 45	Guardianship of Infants Act 1925	The whole act.
18 & 19 Geo. 5. c. 26	Administration of Justice Act 1928	Section 16.
20 & 21 Geo. 5. c. 33	Illegitimate Children (Scotland) Act 1930	The whole act.
22 & 23 Geo. 5. c. 47	Children and Young Persons (Scotland) Act 1932	The whole act.
2 & 3 Geo. 6. c. 4	Custody of Children (Scotland) Act 1939	The whole act.
11 & 12 Geo. 6. c. 29	National Assistance Act 1948	Section 44.
6 & 7 Eliz. 2. c. 40	Matrimonial Proceedings (Children) Act 1958	Section 7. In section 8(1), the words "maintenance and education". In section 10(1), the words "maintenance and education". In section 11(1), the words "maintenance and education". In section 13(1) and (1A), the words "maintenance and education". Section 14.
1964 c. 41	Succession (Scotland) Act 1964	Section 4. In section 6, the words from "For the purposes" to the end. In section 9(1)(a) and (b), the words from "or by any" to "intestate". Section 10A. In section 11, in subsection (1), the words from "by virtue" to "rule of law" and the words from "In this" to the end, in subsection (2), the words from "For the purposes" to the end and, in subsection (4), the words "section 10A of this Act or of". In section 13, the words from "In this section" to the end. In section 33(1), the words from "(other than" to "said section 10A". In section 36(1), in the definition of "issue", the word "lawful".
1965 c. 49	Registration of Births, Deaths and Marriages (Scotland) Act 1965	In section 18(2)(c), the words "within the like period". In section 43(3), the words from "in this definition" to the end.
1968 c. 49	Social Work (Scotland) Act 1968	In section 81, subsection (1); in subsection (2) the words "for aliment" where second occurring; and, in subsection (3), the words from the beginning to "section or".
1968 c. 70	Law Reform (Miscellaneous Provisions) (Scotland) Act 1968	Sections 1 to 6. In section 7, the words from the beginning to "this Act". In section 11, in subsection (1), paragraph (b) and the preceding "and", the words "or, as the case may be, is (or was) the father of that child" and the words "or paternity"; in subsection (2) the words from "or to" to "section", the words from "or, as" to "child" and the words "or affiliation"; in subsection (3) the words "or affiliation"; and in subsection (6) paragraph (b). Schedule 1.
1973 c. 29	Guardianship Act 1973	Section 10. Section 11(6). In section 12(1)(b), the words "under the Guardianship of Infants Act 1886". Section 15(1)(b). Schedule 4. In Schedule 5, paragraphs 1 to 3.
1973 c. 45	Domicile and Matrimonial Proceedings Act 1973	In Schedule 2, in paragraph 4, the words from "as extended" to the end, and paragraph 8.
1975 c. 72	Children Act 1975	In section 47, subsection (1); in subsection (2) the words from "having" to "decided)"; subsection (3); and in subsection (5) paragraphs (b) and (c). In section 48(1), the words from "and for this" to the end. In section 53, in subsection (1), the words from "the applicant" to "child and".
1976 c. 71	Supplementary Benefits Act 1976	In section 17(2)(a), the words from "or, in Scotland," to "established". Section 19.
1977 c. 15	Marriage (Scotland) Act 1977	Section 2(2)(b) and the word "and" preceding it.
1978 c. 28	Adoption (Scotland) Act 1978	In section 65(1), in paragraph (a) of the definition of "guardian", the words from "in accordance" to "1971".
1983 c. 12	Divorce Jurisdiction, Court Fees and Legal Aid (Scotland) Act 1983	In Schedule 1, paragraphs 3 and 4.

== Subsequent developments ==
The Family Law (Scotland) Act 2006 amended section 1 of the act to provide that no person whose status is governed by the law of Scotland shall be illegitimate, completing the abolition of the status of illegitimacy in Scots law.
