= Law Reform (Miscellaneous Provisions) (Scotland) Act 1985 =

Act of the Parliament of the United Kingdom

Law Reform (Miscellaneous Provisions) (Scotland) Act 1985 (Note: Section 60(1).)
- Act of Parliament
- Parliament of the United Kingdom
- Long title: An Act to amend the law of Scotland in respect of certain leases, other contracts and obligations; certain courts and their powers; evidence and procedure; certain criminal penalties; the care of children; the functions of the Commissioner for Local Administration; solicitors; and certain procedures relating to crofting and the valuation of sheep stocks; and to make, as respects Scotland, certain other miscellaneous reforms of the law.
- Citation: 1985 c. 73
- Territorial extent: Scotland (Note: Section 60(1).)

Dates
- Royal assent: 30 October 1985
- Commencement: 30 October 1985 (various provisions) (Note: Section 60(3)(a).); 30 December 1985 (most remaining provisions) (Note: Section 60(3)(d).); Various days by order (certain provisions) (Note: Sections 60(3)(b) and (c). The Law Reform (Miscellaneous Provisions) (Scotland) Act 1985 (Commencement No. 2) Order 1985 (SI 1985/2055).)
Other legislation
Amends	Jurors (Scotland) Act 1825; Juries (Scotland) 1826; Registration of Leases (Scotland) Act 1857; Lyon King of Arms Act 1867; Titles to Land Consolidation (Scotland) Act 1868; Bills of Exchange Act 1882; Sheriff Courts (Scotland) Act 1907; Conveyancing (Scotland) Act 1924; Sheriff Clerks and Legal Officers (Scotland) Act 1927; Administration of Justice (Scotland) Act 1933; Private Legislation Procedure (Scotland) Act 1936; Hill Farming Act 1946; Crown Proceedings Act 1947; Legal Aid and Solicitors (Scotland) Act 1949; Prisons (Scotland) Act 1952; Army Act 1955; Air Force Act 1955; Crofters (Scotland) Act 1955; Food and Drugs (Scotland) Act 1956; Naval Discipline Act 1957; Matrimonial Proceedings (Children) Act 1958; Building Societies Act 1962; Criminal Justice (Scotland) Act 1963; Registration of Births, Deaths and Marriages (Scotland) Act 1965; Legal Aid (Scotland) Act 1967; Criminal Justice Act 1967; Social Work (Scotland) Act 1968; Income and Corporation Taxes Act 1970; Conveyancing and Feudal Reform (Scotland) Act 1970; Sheriff Courts (Scotland) Act 1971; Legal Advice and Assistance Act 1972; Administration of Justice (Scotland) Act 1972; Prescription and Limitation (Scotland) Act 1973; Land Tenure Reform (Scotland) Act 1974; District Courts (Scotland) Act 1975; Criminal Procedure (Scotland) Act 1975; Local Government (Scotland) Act 1975; Crofting (Reform) (Scotland) Act 1976; Licensing (Scotland) Act 1976; Adoption (Scotland) Act 1978; National Health Service (Scotland) Act 1978; Land Registration (Scotland) Act 1979; Estate Agents Act 1979; Bail etc. (Scotland) Act 1980; Finance Act 1980; Solicitors (Scotland) Act 1980; Criminal Justice (Scotland) Act 1980; Matrimonial Homes (Family Protection) (Scotland) Act 1981; Civil Jurisdiction and Judgments Act 1982; Cinematograph (Amendment) Act 1982; Transport Act 1982; Road Traffic Regulation Act 1984; Mental Health (Scotland) Act 1984; Rent (Scotland) Act 1984; Family Law (Scotland) Act 1985; Representation of the People Act 1985; See § Repealed enactments
Amended by	Family Law Act 1986; Criminal Justice (Scotland) Act 1987; Income and Corporation Taxes Act 1988; Court of Session Act 1988; Copyright, Designs and Patents Act 1988; Road Traffic (Consequential Provisions) Act 1988; Prisons (Scotland) Act 1989; Law Reform (Miscellaneous Provisions) (Scotland) Act 1990; Agricultural Holdings (Scotland) Act 1991; Crofters (Scotland) Act 1993; Trade Marks Act 1994; Criminal Procedure (Consequential Provisions) (Scotland) Act 1995; Scottish Legal Services Ombudsman and Commissioner for Local Administration in Scotland Act 1997; Scotland Act 1998 (Consequential Modifications) (No.2) Order 1999; Public Appointments and Public Bodies etc. (Scotland) Act 2003; Agricultural Holdings (Scotland) Act 2003; Mental Health (Care and Treatment) (Scotland) Act 2003; Constitutional Reform Act 2005; Charities and Trustee Investment (Scotland) Act 2005; Licensing (Scotland) Act 2005; Adoption and Children (Scotland) Act 2007; Bankruptcy and Diligence etc. (Scotland) Act 2007; Judiciary and Courts (Scotland) Act 2008; Land Registration etc. (Scotland) Act 2012; Courts Reform (Scotland) Act 2014; Consumer Protection (Amendment) Regulations 2014; Land Reform (Scotland) Act 2016; Courts Reform (Scotland) Act 2014 (Relevant Officer and Consequential Provisions) Order 2016; Coronavirus (Scotland) Act 2020; Digital Markets, Competition and Consumers Act 2024 (Consequential Amendments) Regulations 2025

Status: Amended

Text of statute as originally enacted

Revised text of statute as amended

Text of the Law Reform (Miscellaneous Provisions) (Scotland) Act 1985 as in force today (including any amendments) within the United Kingdom, from legislation.gov.uk.

The Law Reform (Miscellaneous Provisions) (Scotland) Act 1985 (1985 c. 73) is an act of the Parliament of the United Kingdom that amended the law of Scotland in respect of leases, contracts and obligations, courts and their powers, evidence and procedure, criminal penalties, the care of children, the functions of the Commissioner for Local Administration, solicitors, and crofting and the valuation of sheep stocks.

== Provisions ==
The act is divided into nine substantive parts. The first part amended the law of Scotland relating to leases, including provisions on the operation of irritancy clauses. The second part dealt with other contracts and obligations, including a power for the court to order rectification of a defectively expressed document (section 8), amendments to the law of prescription, and amendments to the Unfair Contract Terms Act 1977 as it applies in Scotland. The third part made various amendments to the law governing courts and their powers, including provisions relating to the jurisdiction of sheriff courts. The fourth part reformed aspects of the law of evidence and procedure in Scottish civil and criminal proceedings. The fifth part amended provisions relating to certain criminal penalties, including fixed penalties for road traffic offences. The sixth part made provision relating to the care of children in Scotland. The seventh part amended the functions of the Commissioner for Local Administration in Scotland. The eighth part amended various provisions relating to solicitors in Scotland, supplemented by schedule 1, which made further amendments to the Solicitors (Scotland) Act 1980. The ninth part made provision relating to certain procedures in connection with crofting and the valuation of sheep stocks.

Schedule 2 to the act made further amendments to a number of enactments, including the Jurors (Scotland) Act 1825, the Juries (Scotland) Act 1826, the Titles to Land Consolidation (Scotland) Act 1868, the Conveyancing (Scotland) Act 1924, the Social Work (Scotland) Act 1968, the Conveyancing and Feudal Reform (Scotland) Act 1970, the Sheriff Courts (Scotland) Act 1971, the Criminal Procedure (Scotland) Act 1975, the Land Registration (Scotland) Act 1979, and the Criminal Justice (Scotland) Act 1980.

=== Repealed enactments ===
Section 59(2) of the act repealed 15 enactments, listed in schedule 4 to the act.

Citation	Short title	Extent of repeal
1825 c. 22	Jurors (Scotland) Act 1825	Sections 11 and 14.
1830 c. 37	Criminal Law (Scotland) Act 1830	In section 10, the words from "Provided also" to the end of the section.
1867 c. 17	Lyon King of Arms Act 1867	Section 11.
1920 c. 53	Jurors (Enrolment of Women) (Scotland) Act 1920	The whole act.
1947 c. 44	Crown Proceedings Act 1947	In section 46, paragraph (c) of the proviso and the word "or" which precedes it.
1949 c. 63	Legal Aid and Solicitors (Scotland) Act 1949	Section 25.
1952 c. 61	Prisons (Scotland) Act 1952	Section 7(2).
1952 c. 61	Prisons (Scotland) Act 1952	Section 18(4) and (5).
1952 c. 61	Prisons (Scotland) Act 1952	Section 35(5)(6).
1965 c. 22	Law Commissions Act 1965	Section 2(5).
1971 c. 10	Vehicles (Excise) Act 1971	In subsection 9(5) (as it applies to Scotland) the words "convicted on indictment of, or is", the words "Part I or", and the words from "the conviction on" to "as the case may be,".
1971 c. 58	Sheriff Courts (Scotland) Act 1971	In section 6, in subsection (1) paragraph (6) and the word "or" which precedes it.
1971 c. 58	Sheriff Courts (Scotland) Act 1971	In section 33(4), the words "whole-time sheriff clerk as".
1975 c. 20	District Courts (Scotland) Act 1975	Section 19.
1975 c. 21	Criminal Procedure (Scotland) Act 1975	In section 448(2C)(6), the words "to the draft case".
1976 c. 32	Lotteries and Amusements Act 1976	In Schedule 3, paragraph 14.
1980 c. 45	Water (Scotland) Act 1980	Section 96.
1980 c. 46	Solicitors (Scotland) Act 1980	In section 6(1)(b), the words "by affidavit or otherwise".
1980 c. 46	Solicitors (Scotland) Act 1980	Section 15(2)(a).
1980 c. 46	Solicitors (Scotland) Act 1980	In section 35(1), the word "and" immediately preceding paragraph (d).
1980 c. 46	Solicitors (Scotland) Act 1980	In Schedule 1, in paragraph 7 the word "annual" in both places where it occurs.
1980 c. 46	Solicitors (Scotland) Act 1980	In Schedule 3, in paragraph 1(1), the words "not exceeding the sum of £25" and paragraph 1(7).

== Subsequent developments ==
Various provisions of the act have been amended or repealed by subsequent legislation. Sections 21, 36, 37, 40, 43, 45, and paragraphs 16 to 20 and 23 of schedule 2 were repealed by section 6 of, and schedule 5 to, the Criminal Procedure (Consequential Provisions) (Scotland) Act 1995, which came into force on 1 April 1996. Sections 14 and 22 were repealed by schedule 5 to the Courts Reform (Scotland) Act 2014. Sections 17, 18, and 20, and paragraph 12 of schedule 2, were repealed by schedule 1 to the Courts Reform (Scotland) Act 2014 (Relevant Officer and Consequential Provisions) Order 2016 (SSI 2016/387). Provisions relating to the Commissioner for Local Administration in Scotland were repealed in part by the Scottish Legal Services Ombudsman and Commissioner for Local Administration in Scotland Act 1997 and subsequently by the Scottish Public Services Ombudsman Act 2002. Provisions relating to charities were repealed by the Charities and Trustee Investment (Scotland) Act 2005 and provisions relating to licensing by the Licensing (Scotland) Act 2005.

Sections 8 and 9 of the act, which concern rectification of defectively expressed documents and personal bar, were amended by schedule 5 to the Land Registration etc. (Scotland) Act 2012. Section 10 of the act, which applied certain unfair contract terms provisions to Scotland, was amended by the Trade Marks Act 1994, the Consumer Protection (Amendment) Regulations 2014 (SI 2014/870) and the Digital Markets, Competition and Consumers Act 2024 (Consequential Amendments) Regulations 2025 (SI 2025/381).
