= Adoption and Children (Scotland) Act 2007 =

Act of the Scottish Parliament

Adoption and Children (Scotland) Act 2007 (Note: Section 121(1).)
- Act of the Scottish Parliament
- Scottish Parliament
- Long title: An Act of the Scottish Parliament to restate and amend the law relating to adoption; to make other provision in relation to the care of children; to enable provision to be made in relation to allowances in respect of certain children; and for connected purposes.
- Citation: 2007 asp 4
- Territorial extent: Scotland

Dates
- Royal assent: 15 January 2007
- Commencement: various (Note: Section 121(2).)

Other legislation
- Amends: Adoption (Scotland) Act 1978; Foster Children (Scotland) Act 1984; Law Reform (Miscellaneous Provisions) (Scotland) Act 1985; Law Reform (Parent and Child) (Scotland) Act 1986; Age of Legal Capacity (Scotland) Act 1991; Human Fertilisation and Embryology (Deceased Fathers) Act 2003
- Amended by: Human Fertilisation and Embryology Act 2008; Public Services Reform (Scotland) Act 2010; Children and Young People (Scotland) Act 2014

Status: Amended

Text of statute as originally enacted

Revised text of statute as amended

Text of the Adoption and Children (Scotland) Act 2007 as in force today (including any amendments) within the United Kingdom, from legislation.gov.uk.

The Adoption and Children (Scotland) Act 2007 (asp 4) is an act of the Scottish Parliament and the chief source of law relating to adoption in Scotland.

== Provisions ==
The act allowed unmarried and same-sex parents to adopt children.

=== Chapter 1: Local authority duties ===
Chapter one of the act imposes a duty on all of Scotland's 32 local authorities to provide an adoption service in their area.

=== Chapter 2: The adoption process ===
==== Factors the court must consider ====
Chapter two sets out the legislative framework behind the adoption process in Scotland. In deciding whether to make an adoption order, granting Parental Rights and Responsibilities (PRR) on the adopter with respect to the child (or children), the court must "regard the need to safeguard and promote the welfare of the child throughout the child's life as the paramount consideration", with particular emphasis on:

- The value of a stable family unit in the child's development.
- The child's ascertainable views regarding the decision (taking account of the child's age and maturity).
- The child's religious persuasion, racial origin and cultural and linguistic background.
- The likely effect on the child, throughout the child's life, of the making of an adoption order.

==== Adoption by a couple ====
For a couple to adopt a child, the following personal criteria must be fulfilled:

- Both parties are aged over 21.
- Neither member of the couple is a parent of the child.
- That both partners are domiciled in the United Kingdom or Ireland (or have been habitually resident in the UK or Ireland for one year).
- The partners are married, in a civil partnership or cohabiting (either heterosexual or homosexual).

==== Adoption by one person ====
A single person may adopt a child if they are aged over 21, domiciled in the UK or Ireland, and are either in a marriage, civil partnership or cohabiting relationship with the parent of the child. They may do so even if said child's birth parent is dead or missing.

==== Consent of the child's birth parents ====
Generally, the consent of an adoptee's parents or guardians who have Parental Rights & Responsibilities under the Children (Scotland) Act 1995 towards the child must be obtained before the court will issue an adoption order. However the consent of the birth parents may be ignored in the following circumstances:

- The parent or guardian is dead.
- The parent or guardian cannot be found or is incapable of giving consent.
- The court views the parent/guardian as unfit to exercise their parental rights and responsibilities (and will continue to do so).
- That, when none of the above applies, the court views dispensing the parent's consent as necessary to ensure the child's welfare.

==== Consent of the child ====
An adoption order cannot be made in respect of a child aged over 12 unless said child consents, or the court considers them not mature enough to consent

== Reception ==
The act was criticised by the Catholic Church in Scotland who described it as "irresponsible". The Scottish National Party supported the legislation for increasing the pool of possible foster parents.

== Implementation ==
The main points of the law came into force in 2008.
