= List of acts of the Parliament of Scotland from 1567 =

This is a list of acts of the Parliament of Scotland for the year 1567.

It lists acts of Parliament of the old Parliament of Scotland, that was merged with the old Parliament of England to form the Parliament of Great Britain, by the Union with England Act 1707 (c. 7).

For other years, see list of acts of the Parliament of Scotland. For the period after 1707, see list of acts of the Parliament of Great Britain.

== 1567 ==
=== April ===
A parliament of Mary, held in Edinburgh from 14 April 1567.

Short title, or popular name	Citation	Royal assent
Long title
Edinburgh Castle Act 1567 (repealed)	April 1567 c. 1 (Note: This is the citation in the Record Edition.) — (Note: This act is not listed in the Duodecimal Edition.)	16 April 1567
The erle of mar his discharge off the castell of Edinburgh. (Repealed by Statute Law Revision (Scotland) Act 1906 (6 Edw. 7. c. 38))
Religion Act 1567 (repealed)	April 1567 c. 2 —	19 April 1567
Act concerning the Religioun. (Repealed by Statute Law Revision (Scotland) Act 1906 (6 Edw. 7. c. 38))
Not public and general	April 1567 c. 3 —	19 April 1567
Ratificatioun to Johnne erle of Mar lord Erskyn of the erledom of Marr and castell of Striviling and utheris.
Not public and general	April 1567 c. 4 —	19 April 1567
Ratificatioun to Schir Richard Maitland of Lethingtoun knycht of the baronie of Blyth.
Not public and general	April 1567 c. 5 —	19 April 1567
Ratificatioun to Maister David Chalmer provest of Creichtoun.
Not public and general	April 1567 c. 6 —	19 April 1567
Ratificatioun to James erle Boithuell lord Halis of the capitanerie of Dunbar, &c.
Act of Oblivion 1567 (repealed)	April 1567 c. 7 —	19 April 1567
Act anent the decisioun of materis concerning the law of oblivioun. (Repealed by Statute Law Revision (Scotland) Act 1906 (6 Edw. 7. c. 38))
Bill Posting Act 1567 (repealed)	April 1567 c. 8 —	19 April 1567
Anentis the makaris and upsettaris of plackardes and billis. (Repealed by Statute Law Revision (Scotland) Act 1906 (6 Edw. 7. c. 38))
Not public and general	April 1567 c. 9 —	19 April 1567
Ratificatioun to the barneis of Robert commendatare of Halyrudehouse.
Not public and general	April 1567 c. 10 —	19 April 1567
Ratificatioun to James Erle of Murray of the erledome of Murray and utheris,
Not public and general	April 1567 c. 11 —	19 April 1567
Ratificatioun to Johnne Chisholme off the Kingis werk in Leith.
Not public and general	April 1567 c. 12 —	19 April 1567
Ratificatioun to George erle of Huntlie of sindrye landis and baronyis.
Not public and general	April 1567 c. 13 —	19 April 1567
Ratificatioun to Johnne lord Hereis of the alteratioun of the halding of ane parte of his heretage to ffre blanche ferme.
Not public and general	April 1567 c. 14 —	19 April 1567
Ratificatioun of a grant to Johnne Semple and Marie Levingstoun.
Not public and general	April 1567 c. 15 —	19 April 1567
Ratificatioun to James Ogilvye of Find later of the landis of Ogilvye Findlater Deskfurde, &c.
Not public and general	April 1567 c. 16 —	19 April 1567
Ratificatioun to the laird of Bourlie off the coronarschip of Fyffe.
Not public and general	April 1567 c. 17 —	19 April 1567
Ratificatioun to the erle of Craufurde of all his landis.
Not public and general	April 1567 c. 18 —	19 April 1567
Ratificatioun to the erle of Rothes.
Not public and general	April 1567 c. 19 —	19 April 1567
Ratificatioun to the erle of Mortoun.
Not public and general	April 1567 c. 20 —	19 April 1567
Ratificatioun to the erle of Angus.
Not public and general	April 1567 c. 21 —	19 April 1567
Ratificatioun to the erle of Caitnes.
Not public and general	April 1567 c. 22 —	19 April 1567
Ratificatioun to the lard of Dalhoussie.
Not public and general	April 1567 c. 23 —	19 April 1567
Reductioun of the forfaltour of umquhile George erle of Huntlie at the instance of his relict and barneis.
Not public and general	April 1567 c. 24 —	19 April 1567
Reductioun of the forfaltour of umquhile George erle of Huntlie at the instance of George now erle of Huntlie.
Not public and general	April 1567 c. 25 —	19 April 1567
Reductioun of the forfaltour of Johnne erle of Sutherland.
Not public and general	April 1567 c. 26 —	19 April 1567
Reductioun of the forfaltour of Alex^{r} Gordoun of Strathdoun George Gordoun of Baldornye and James Gordoun of Lesmoir.
Not public and general	April 1567 c. 27 —	19 April 1567
Reductioun of the forfaltour of Jhonne Gordoun of Carnburro and James Gordoun of Tulyangus.
Not public and general	April 1567 c. 28 —	19 April 1567
Reductioun of the forfaltour of Maister George Gordoun of Baldornye.
Not public and general	April 1567 c. 29 —	19 April 1567
Reductioun of the forfaltour of Thomas Gordoun of Craigtullie.
Not public and general	April 1567 c. 30 —	19 April 1567
Reductioun of the forfaltour of David Balfour of Balbuthies.

=== December ===
The 1st parliament of James VI.

Short title, or popular name	Citation	Royal assent
Long title
Accession and Coronation Act 1567 (repealed)	December 1567 c. 1 (Note: This is the citation in the Record Edition.) — (Note: This act is not listed in the Duodecimal Edition.)	20 December 1567
Anent the demissioun of the Crowne in favouris of our Soverane lord and his Majesteis coronatioun. (Repealed by Statute Law Revision (Scotland) Act 1906 (6 Edw. 7. c. 38))
Regent Act 1567 (repealed)	December 1567 c. 2; 1567 c. 1 (Note: This is the citation in the Duodecimal Edition.)	20 December 1567
Anent the constitutoun of James erle of Murray in regent to our Soverane lord his realme and liegis. (Repealed by Statute Law Revision (Scotland) Act 1906 (6 Edw. 7. c. 38))
Abolition of Papal Authority Act 1567 (repealed)	December 1567 c. 3; 1567 c. 2	20 December 1567
Anent the abolissing of the Pape and his usurpit authoritie. (Repealed by Statute Law Revision (Scotland) Act 1906 (6 Edw. 7. c. 38))
Repeal of Acts in Support of Papacy Act 1567 (repealed)	December 1567 c. 4; 1567 c. 3	20 December 1567
Anent the annulling of the actis of Parliament maid aganis Goddis word and mantenance of idolatrie in ony tymes bypast. (Repealed by Statute Law Revision (Scotland) Act 1906 (6 Edw. 7. c. 38))
Confession of Faith Act 1567 (repealed)	Vol III, p. 14; Vol I, p. 337	20 December 1567
The Confessioun of the faith and doctrine belevit and professit be the Protestantis of the Realme of Scotland exhibitit to the estatis of same in Parliament and by thair public votis authorisit as a doctrine groundit upon the infallibill word of God. (Repealed by Statute Law Revision (Scotland) Act 1906 (6 Edw. 7. c. 38))
Mass Act 1567 (repealed)	December 1567 c. 5; 1567 c. 5	20 December 1567
Anent the messe abolisehit and punisching of all that heiris or sayis the samin. (Repealed by Statute Law Revision (Scotland) Act 1906 (6 Edw. 7. c. 38))
Church Act 1567 (repealed)	December 1567 c. 6; 1567 c. 6	20 December 1567
Anent the trew and haly kirk and of thame that are declarit not to be of the samin. (Repealed by Statute Law Revision (Scotland) Act 1906 (6 Edw. 7. c. 38))
Thirds of Benefices Act 1567 (repealed)	December 1567 c. 7; 1567 c. 7	20 December 1567
Anent the admissioun of thame that salbe presentit to benefices havand cure of ministerie. (Repealed by Statute Law Revision (Scotland) Act 1906 (6 Edw. 7. c. 38))
Coronation Oath Act 1567 still in force	December 1567 c. 8; 1567 c. 8	20 December 1567
Anent the Kingis aith to be geuin at his Coronatioun.
Holders of Public Offices Act 1567 (repealed)	December 1567 c. 9; 1567 c. 9	20 December 1567
Anentis thame that suld beir publict office heirefter. (Repealed by Statute Law Revision (Scotland) Act 1906 (6 Edw. 7. c. 38))
Ministers Act 1567 (repealed)	December 1567 c. 10; 1567 c. 10	20 December 1567
Anent thriddis of benefices grantit in the moneth of December the yeir of God 1561 yeiris for sustening of the Ministeris and uther effairis of the Prince. (Repealed by Statute Law Revision (Scotland) Act 1906 (6 Edw. 7. c. 38))
School Teachers Act 1567 (repealed)	December 1567 c. 11; 1567 c. 11	20 December 1567
Anent thame that salbe teicheris of the youth in sculis. (Repealed by Statute Law Revision (Scotland) Act 1906 (6 Edw. 7. c. 38))
Church Jurisdiction Act 1567 still in force	December 1567 c. 12 —	20 December 1567
Anent the iurisdictioun of the kirk. Regarding the jurisdiction of the church.
College Bursaries Act 1567	December 1567 c. 13; 1567 c. 12	20 December 1567
Anent the dispositoun of provestreis prebendareis and chaplanereis to bursaris to be fundit in collegeis.
Fornication Act 1567 (repealed)	December 1567 c. 14; 1567 c. 13	20 December 1567
Anent the fylthie vice of fornicatioun and punischement of the samin. (Repealed by Statute Law Revision (Scotland) Act 1906 (6 Edw. 7. c. 38))
Incest Act 1567 (repealed)	December 1567 c. 15; 1567 c. 14	20 December 1567
Anent thame that committis incest. (Repealed by Statute Law Revision (Scotland) Act 1906 (6 Edw. 7. c. 38))
Marriage Act 1567 (repealed)	December 1567 c. 16; 1567 c. 15	20 December 1567
Anent lauchfull mariage of the awin blude in degreis not forbiddin be Goddis worde. (Repealed by Marriage (Scotland) Act 1977 (c. 15))
Game Act 1567 (repealed)	December 1567 c. 17; 1567 c. 16	20 December 1567
Anent slaying of hart hynde and utheris beistis and foulis with culveringis. (Repealed by Statute Law Revision (Scotland) Act 1906 (6 Edw. 7. c. 38))
Queen Act 1567 (repealed)	December 1567 c. 18 —	20 December 1567
Anent the act of Parliament maid of befoir of the declaratioun of our Soverane lordis motheris perfyte age. (Repealed by Statute Law Revision (Scotland) Act 1906 (6 Edw. 7. c. 38))
Queen (No. 2) Act 1567 (repealed)	December 1567 c. 19 —	20 December 1567
Anent the retentioun of our Soverane lordis motheris person. (Repealed by Statute Law Revision (Scotland) Act 1906 (6 Edw. 7. c. 38))
Queen at Lochleven Act 1567 (repealed)	December 1567 c. 20 —	20 December 1567
The declaratioun of Parliament maid to the laird of Lochlevin anent the keiping of the Kingis mother in the hous and fortalice of Lochlevin. (Repealed by Statute Law Revision (Scotland) Act 1906 (6 Edw. 7. c. 38))
Coinage Act 1567 (repealed)	December 1567 c. 21; 1567 c. 17	20 December 1567
Anent cunye. (Repealed by Statute Law Revision (Scotland) Act 1906 (6 Edw. 7. c. 38))
Court of Session Act 1567 (repealed)	December 1567 c. 22; 1567 c. 18	20 December 1567
Anent the supplicatioun gevin in be the lordis of Sessioun for declaratioun in Parliament gif the saidis Lordis of Sessioun be jugeis to ony infeftment or gift grantit or confirmit in Parliament. (Repealed by Statute Law Revision (Scotland) Act 1964 (c. 80))
Firearms Act 1567 (repealed)	December 1567 c. 23; 1567 c. 18	20 December 1567
Anent schuiting and beiring of culveringis and daggis. (Repealed by Statute Law Revision (Scotland) Act 1906 (6 Edw. 7. c. 38))
Coining Act 1567 (repealed)	December 1567 c. 24; 1567 c. 19	20 December 1567
Anent fals cunye. (Repealed by Statute Law Revision (Scotland) Act 1906 (6 Edw. 7. c. 38))
Commission to Report on Articles Act 1567 (repealed)	December 1567 c. 25 —	20 December 1567
Ane Commissioun to certaine lordis of the Estatis to considder sik articklis as is committit to thame and to report the samin againe in the nixt parliament. (Repealed by Statute Law Revision (Scotland) Act 1906 (6 Edw. 7. c. 38))
Benefices Act 1567 (repealed)	December 1567 c. 26; 1567 c. 20	20 December 1567
Approbatioun of giftis of benefices and pen siounis sen the moneth of August 1560 yeiris grantit and gevin be our soverane lordis mother. (Repealed by Statute Law Revision (Scotland) Act 1906 (6 Edw. 7. c. 38))
Theft Act 1567 (repealed)	December 1567 c. 27; 1567 c. 21	20 December 1567
Anent thift and resset of thift takin of the presonaris be thevis or bandis for ran sounis and punischement of the samin. (Repealed by Statute Law Revision (Scotland) Act 1906 (6 Edw. 7. c. 38))
Horses Act 1567 (repealed)	December 1567 c. 28; 1567 c. 22	20 December 1567
That na hors be caryit furth of the realme as commoun merchandice. (Repealed by Statute Law Revision (Scotland) Act 1906 (6 Edw. 7. c. 38))
Court of Session Act 1567 (repealed)	December 1567 c. 29 —	20 December 1567
Anent the residence and sitting of the Lordis of Sessioun for administratioun of justice. (Repealed by Statute Law Revision (Scotland) Act 1906 (6 Edw. 7. c. 38))
Escheat Act 1567 (repealed)	December 1567 c. 30; 1567 c. 23	20 December 1567
Anent giftis of escheit. (Repealed by Statute Law Revision (Scotland) Act 1906 (6 Edw. 7. c. 38))
Churchmen Act 1567 (repealed)	December 1567 c. 31; 1567 c. 24	20 December 1567
Anent privilegeis grantit to kirkmen. Regarding privileges granted to churchmen. (Repealed by Statute Law Revision (Scotland) Act 1906 (6 Edw. 7. c. 38))
Barons Act 1567 (repealed)	December 1567 c. 32; 1567 c. 25	20 December 1567
The ratificatioun of the privilegeis of the barronis. (Repealed by Statute Law Revision (Scotland) Act 1906 (6 Edw. 7. c. 38))
Burghs Act 1567 (repealed)	December 1567 c. 33; 1567 c. 26	20 December 1567
Anent the privilege grantit to burrowis. (Repealed by Statute Law Revision (Scotland) Act 1906 (6 Edw. 7. c. 38))
Sasines with Burgh Act 1567 (repealed)	December 1567 c. 34; 1567 c. 27	20 December 1567
Anent geving of sesingis within burgh. (Repealed by Statute Law Revision (Scotland) Act 1906 (6 Edw. 7. c. 38))
Dunbar Castle Act 1567 (repealed)	December 1567 c. 35 —	20 December 1567
Anent the demolischeing of the castell of Dunbar and forth of Inchkeith. (Repealed by Statute Law Revision (Scotland) Act 1906 (6 Edw. 7. c. 38))
Commissariot Procedure Act 1567 (repealed)	December 1567 c. 36; 1567 c. 28	20 December 1567
Anent the declaratioun to the Commissaris, how thay sall proceid in beneficiall materis. (Repealed by Statute Law Revision (Scotland) Act 1906 (6 Edw. 7. c. 38))
Maltman Act 1567 (repealed)	December 1567 c. 37; 1567 c. 29	20 December 1567
Anent the dekinnis of maltmen. (Repealed by Statute Law Revision (Scotland) Act 1906 (6 Edw. 7. c. 38))
Salmon, etc. Act 1567 (repealed)	December 1567 c. 38; 1567 c. 30	20 December 1567
Anent blak fische cutting of grene wod and slauchter of smoltis. (Repealed by Statute Law Revision (Scotland) Act 1906 (6 Edw. 7. c. 38))
Printing of Acts Act 1567 (repealed)	December 1567 c. 39; 1567 c. 32	20 December 1567
Anent the prenting of the actis maid in this present Parliament and of the act maid in our soveranes grandschiris tyme, anent the raising of fyre and birning. (Repealed by Statute Law Revision (Scotland) Act 1906 (6 Edw. 7. c. 38))
Fire Raising Act 1567 (repealed)	December 1567 c. 40; 1567 c. 33	20 December 1567
Anent the raising of fyre and birning. (Repealed by Statute Law Revision (Scotland) Act 1906 (6 Edw. 7. c. 38))

=== Sources ===
- Alexander, William (1841). "Acta Parliamentorum Mariæ Reginæ". An Abridgement of the Acts of the Parliaments of Scotland. Edinburgh: Adam and Charles Black. pp. A20 – A21 – via Google Books.
- Alexander, William (1841). "Acta Parliamentorum Mariæ Reginæ". An Abridgement of the Acts of the Parliaments of Scotland. Edinburgh: Adam and Charles Black. p. A21 – via Google Books.
- Alexander, William (1841). "Acta Parliamentorum Regis Jacobi Sexti". An Abridgement of the Acts of the Parliaments of Scotland. Edinburgh: Adam and Charles Black. p. A21 – via Google Books.
- Alexander, William (1841). "Acta Parliamentorum Regis Jacobi Sexti". An Abridgement of the Acts of the Parliaments of Scotland. Edinburgh: Adam and Charles Black. pp. A20 – A21 – via Google Books.
- Chronological Table of the Statutes. London: Her Majesty's Stationery Office. 1972. pp. 1334–1335 – via Google Books.
- "Acts of the Old Scottish Parliament: 1567". legislation.gov.uk. The National Archives.
- "Index of Statutes: Mary I (1542-1567)". Records of the Parliaments of Scotland to 1707. University of St Andrews.
- "Index of Statutes: James VI (1567-1625)". Records of the Parliaments of Scotland to 1707. University of St Andrews.

== See also ==
- List of legislation in the United Kingdom
- Records of the Parliaments of Scotland
