= Registration of Births, Deaths and Marriages (Scotland) Act 1965 =

Act of the Parliament of the United Kingdom

Registration of Births, Deaths and Marriages (Scotland) Act 1965 (Note: Section 59(1).)
- Act of Parliament
- Parliament of the United Kingdom
- Long title: An Act to make new provision as respects the registration of births, deaths and marriages in Scotland, and as respects the recording of changes of name or surname there, and for purposes connected therewith.
- Citation: 1965 c. 49
- Territorial extent: Scotland (Note: Section 59(2).)

Dates
- Royal assent: 5 August 1965
- Commencement: 1 January 1966 (Note: Section 59(3).)
Other legislation
Amends	Marriage (Scotland) Act 1939; Secretary for Scotland Act 1885
Amended by	Statute Law (Repeals) Act 1974; Marriage (Scotland) Act 1977; Adoption (Scotland) Act 1978; Statute Law (Repeals) Act 1981; Law Reform (Miscellaneous Provisions) (Scotland) Act 1985; Law Reform (Parent and Child) (Scotland) Act 1986; Age of Legal Capacity (Scotland) Act 1991; Statute Law (Repeals) Act 1993; Scotland Act 1998; Human Fertilisation and Embryology (Deceased Fathers) Act 2003; Human Fertilisation and Embryology Act 2008; Marriage and Civil Partnership (Scotland) Act 2014

Status: Amended

Text of statute as originally enacted

Revised text of statute as amended

Text of the Registration of Births, Deaths and Marriages (Scotland) Act 1965 as in force today (including any amendments) within the United Kingdom, from legislation.gov.uk.

The Registration of Births, Deaths and Marriages (Scotland) Act 1965 (c. 49) is an act of the Parliament of the United Kingdom, which amended the existing legislation controlling the registration system of births, deaths and marriages in Scotland founded in 1855. The act set out the roles, responsibilities and functions of the Registrar General for Scotland, and the ability of the Registrar-General to appoint other Registrars. The act also provides for a yearly report to be published by the Registrar-General delineating annual trends in Scotland's population - including estimated population size, birth rates, death rates and migration rates to be presented to Scottish Ministers.

The act has been substantially amended in many areas with succeeding legislation, such as the Local Government (Scotland) Act 1973, the Marriage (Scotland) Act 1977, the Adoption (Scotland) Act 1978, the British Nationality Act 1981 and the Scotland Act 1998. The Scotland Act transferred overall control of the Registrar General for Scotland and the General Register Office for Scotland from the Scottish Office to the Scottish Executive- the devolved government of Scotland. However many of the central functions of the General Register Office for Scotland continue to be governed by the act.

== Subsequent developments ==
Section 58(2) of, and schedule 2 to, the act were repealed by section 1 of, and part XI of the schedule to, the Statute Law (Repeals) Act 1974, which came into force on 27 June 1974.

== See also ==
- Demographics of Scotland
- Scottish People
- Politics of Scotland
- General Register Office for Scotland
