= Adoption Act 1976 =

Act of the Parliament of the United Kingdom

Adoption Act 1976 (Note: Section 74(1).)
- Act of Parliament
- Parliament of the United Kingdom
- Long title: An Act to consolidate the enactments having effect in England and Wales in relation to adoption.
- Citation: 1976 c. 36
- Territorial extent: England and Wales (Note: Section 74(3).)

Dates
- Royal assent: 22 July 1976
- Commencement: 1 January 1988 (Note: Section 74(2). The Children Act 1975 and the Adoption Act 1976 (Commencement No. 2) Order 1987 (SI 1987/1242).)
Other legislation
Amends	See § Repealed enactments
Repeals/revokes	Adoption Act 1958; Adoption Act 1960; Adoption Act 1964; Adoption Act 1968
Amended by	Domestic Proceedings and Magistrates' Courts Act 1978; Adoption (Scotland) Act 1978; Child Care Act 1980; Foster Children Act 1980; Senior Courts Act 1981; Foster Children (Scotland) Act 1984; Family Law Reform Act 1987; Legal Aid Act 1988; Trusts of Land and Appointment of Trustees Act 1996; Adoption and Children Act 2002
Relates to	Adoption (Scotland) Act 1978

Status: Partially repealed

Text of statute as originally enacted

Revised text of statute as amended

Text of the Adoption Act 1976 as in force today (including any amendments) within the United Kingdom, from legislation.gov.uk.

The Adoption Act 1976 (c. 36) is an act of the Parliament of the United Kingdom that consolidated enactments related to adoption in England and Wales.

The Adoption (Scotland) Act 1978 made equivalent provisions for Scotland.

== Background ==
Consolidation of acts related to children and young persons was first proposed by the Law Commission in their first programme on consolidation and statute law revision, published on 17 November 1965. However, following this work was abandoned following the introduction and passage of the Children and Young Persons Act 1969.

The Commission proposed resuming their work on consolidation in this field in their second programme on consolidation and statute law revision, published on 20 April 1971. The Commission proposed that following the report of the Houghton Committee on the Adoption of Children, they should progress with the consolidation of the law of adoption, compromising of the Adoption Act 1958 (7 & 8 Eliz. 2. c. 5), the Adoption Act 1960 (8 & 9 Eliz. 2. c. 59), the Adoption Act 1964 and the Adoption Act 1968, in addition to the consolidation of the law of employment of children, compromising of the Employment of Women, Young Persons, and Children Act 1920 (10 & 11 Geo. 5. c. 65), part II of the Children and Young Persons Act 1933 (23 & 24 Geo. 5. c. 12 ) and part II of the Children and Young Persons Act 1963.

== Provisions ==
=== Repealed enactments ===
Section 73(3) of the act repealed 13 enactments, listed in schedule 4 to the act.

Citation	Short title	Extent of repeal
7 & 8 Eliz. 2. c. 5	Adoption Act 1958	The whole act so far as unrepealed.
1959 c. 72	Mental Health Act 1959	In section 19(3), the words " or a protected child within the meaning of Part IV of the Adoption Act 1958 ".
1960 c. 59	Adoption Act 1960	The whole act.
1964 c. 57	Adoption Act 1964	The whole act.
1968 c. 46	Health Services and Public Health Act 1968	In section 64(3)(a), paragraphs (v) and (xii).
1968 c. 46	Health Services and Public Health Act 1968	In section 65(3)(b), paragraphs (v) and (xiii).
1968 c. 53	Adoption Act 1968	The whole act.
1969 c. 54	Children and Young Persons Act 1969	In Schedule 5, paragraphs 33 to 36.
1970 c. 31	Administration of Justice Act 1970	In Schedule 1, the paragraph relating to appeals under section 10 of the Adoption Act 1958.
1970 c. 42	Local Authority Social Services Act 1970	In Schedule 1, the paragraphs relating to the Adoption Act 1958 and Part I of the Children Act 1975.
1971 c. 3	Guardianship of Minors Act 1971	In Schedule 1, the paragraph relating to the Adoption Act 1958.
1972 c. 70	Local Government Act 1972	In Schedule 23, paragraph 8.
1975 c. 72	Children Act 1975	Part I.
1975 c. 72	Children Act 1975	Section 100(4), (5) and (6).
1975 c. 72	Children Act 1975	In section 102(1), the words " Part I except section 24(6) or " and paragraph (a).
1975 c. 72	Children Act 1975	In section 107(1), the definitions of " adoption order", " adoption society ", "approved adoption society", "British adoption order", " British territory ", "the Convention", "Convention adoption order", " Convention country " and " United Kingdom national", and, in the definition of " guardian ", paragraph (b).
1975 c. 72	Children Act 1975	Schedules 1 and 2.
1975 c. 72	Children Act 1975	In Schedule 3, paragraphs 6, 16(b), 17, 21 to 40, 44, 45, 61 to 65, and 74(a).
1976 c. 31	Legitimacy Act 1976	In Schedule 1, paragraph 7.

== Subsequent developments ==
Most provisions of the act were repealed by section 139(3) of, and schedule 5 to, the Adoption and Children Act 2002, which came into force on 30 December 2005. Certain provisions of the act were preserved for transitional purposes by schedule 4 to that act, in particular in respect of adoptions made before that date.
