= Noise Abatement Act 1960 =

Act of the Parliament of the United Kingdom

Noise Abatement Act 1960 (Note: Section 5(1).)
- Act of Parliament
- Parliament of the United Kingdom
- Long title: An Act to make new provisions in respect of the control of noise and vibration with a view to their abatement.
- Citation: 8 & 9 Eliz. 2. c. 68
- Introduced by: Rupert Speir (Commons); Lord Conesford (Lords)
- Territorial extent: England and Wales; Scotland; (Note: Section 5(2).)

Dates
- Royal assent: 27 October 1960
- Commencement: 27 November 1960 (Note: Section 5(3).)
- Repealed: England and Wales: 1 January 1976 (Note: The Control of Pollution Act 1974 (Commencement No. 4) Order 1975 (SI 1975/2118).); Scotland: 18 July 1976 (Note: The Control of Pollution Act 1974 (Commencement No. 7) Order 1976 (SI 1976/1080).)
Other legislation
Amends	London County Council (General Powers) Act 1937
Repealed by	Control of Pollution Act 1974
Relates to	Public Health Act 1936; Public Health (Scotland) Act 1897

Status: Repealed

Text of statute as originally enacted

The Noise Abatement Act 1960 (8 & 9 Eliz. 2. c. 68) was an act of the Parliament of the United Kingdom that made provision for the control of noise and vibration in England and Wales and Scotland. It made noise or vibration that was a nuisance a statutory nuisance and restricted the use of loudspeakers in streets.

== Provisions ==
Section 1 of the act provided that noise or vibration which was a nuisance was a statutory nuisance for the purposes of part III of the Public Health Act 1936 (26 Geo. 5 & 1 Edw. 8. c. 49). A complaint could be made by any three or more persons each of whom was an occupier of land or premises and was aggrieved by the nuisance. In proceedings in respect of noise or vibration caused in the course of a trade or business, it was a defence to prove that the best practicable means had been used for preventing, and for counteracting the effect of, the noise or vibration.

Section 1(5) of the act adapted the section for Scotland, where the noise or vibration was a nuisance to be dealt with summarily under part II of the Public Health (Scotland) Act 1897 (60 & 61 Vict. c. 38). Section 1(6) applied section 66 of the London County Council (General Powers) Act 1937 (1 Edw. 8 & 1 Geo. 6. c. xci) to vibration as well as noise. Section 1(7) of the act provided that neither section 1 nor that section 66 applied to noise or vibration caused by aircraft.

Section 2 of the act prohibited the operation of a loudspeaker in a street between nine in the evening and eight in the following morning for any purpose, and at any other time for the purpose of advertising any entertainment, trade or business. The prohibition was subject to exceptions, including operation for police, fire brigade or ambulance purposes and in an emergency. A person who operated, or permitted the operation of, a loudspeaker in contravention was liable on summary conviction to a fine not exceeding ten pounds.

Section 3 of the act empowered the responsible minister to repeal, by statutory instrument, any provision of a local act that appeared to be unnecessary having regard to the act. Section 4 of the act saved byelaws, and section 4(2) repealed section 66(4)(b) of the London County Council (General Powers) Act 1937 (1 Edw. 8 & 1 Geo. 6. c. xci).

== Subsequent developments ==
The whole act was repealed by section 108(2) of, and schedule 4 to, the Control of Pollution Act 1974, which came into force for England and Wales on 1 January 1976 and for Scotland on 18 July 1976, but not so as to affect notices served under section 1 of this act before section 58 of the 1974 act came into force.
