= Marriage (Scotland) Act 1977 =

Act of the Parliament of the United Kingdom

Marriage (Scotland) Act 1977 (Note: Section 29(1).)
- Act of Parliament
- Parliament of the United Kingdom
- Long title: An Act to make new provision for Scotland as respects the law relating to the constitution of marriage, and for connected purposes.
- Citation: 1977 c. 15
- Territorial extent: Scotland (Note: Section 29(3).)

Dates
- Royal assent: 31 August 1977
- Commencement: 1 January 1978 (Note: Section 29(2).)

Other legislation
- Amends: See § Repealed enactments
- Repeals/revokes: See § Repealed enactments
- Amended by: Criminal Procedure (Scotland) Act 1975; Law Reform (Miscellaneous Provisions) (Scotland) Act 1980; Law Reform (Parent and Child) (Scotland) Act 1986; Marriage (Prohibited Degrees of Relationship) Act 1986; Family Law Act 1986; Foreign Marriage (Amendment) Act 1988; Criminal Procedure (Consequential Provisions) (Scotland) Act 1995; Marriage (Scotland) Act 2002; Gender Recognition Act 2004; Civil Partnership Act 2004; Family Law (Scotland) Act 2006; Employment Equality (Age) Regulations 2006; Local Electoral Administration and Registration Services (Scotland) Act 2006; Family Law (Scotland) Act 2006 (Consequential Modifications) Order 2006; Human Fertilisation and Embryology (Consequential Amendments and Transitional and Saving Provisions) Order 2009; Marriage and Civil Partnership (Scotland) Act 2014; Marriage Between Civil Partners (Procedure for Change and Fees) (Scotland) Regulations 2014; Qualifying Civil Partnership Modification (Scotland) Order 2015; Referral and Investigation of Proposed Marriages and Civil Partnerships (Scotland) Order 2015; Multilingual Standard Forms (Consequential Amendments) (Scotland) Regulations 2018; Civil Partnership (Scotland) Act 2020; Immigration and Social Security Co-ordination (EU Withdrawal) Act 2020 (Consequential, Saving, Transitional and Transitory Provisions) (EU Exit) Regulations 2020

Status: Amended

Text of statute as originally enacted

Revised text of statute as amended

Text of the Marriage (Scotland) Act 1977 as in force today (including any amendments) within the United Kingdom, from legislation.gov.uk.

The Marriage (Scotland) Act 1977 (c. 15) is an act of the Parliament of the United Kingdom that made new provision for the law relating to the constitution of marriage in Scotland.

== Provisions ==
=== Repealed enactments ===
Section 28(2) of the act repealed 19 enactments, listed in the schedule 3 to the act.

Citation	Short title	Extent of repeal
1567 c. 16	Marriage Act 1567	The whole act.
10 Anne c. 10	Scottish Episcopalians Act 1711	Section 7.
4 & 5 Will. 4. c. 28	Marriage (Scotland) Act 1834	The whole act.
41 & 42 Vict. c. 43	Marriage Notice (Scotland) Act 1878	The whole act.
48 & 49 Vict. c. 61	Secretary for Scotland Act 1885	In the Schedule, the entry relating to marriage notices.
6 Edw. 7. c. 40	Marriage with Foreigners Act 1906	Section 5. In the Schedule, the heading "Part I Provisions Applicable Except in Scotland"; and Part II.
8 Edw. 7. c. 26	Naval Marriages Act 1908	The whole act.
5 & 6 Geo. 5. c. 40	Marriage of British Subjects (Facilities) Act 1915	The whole act.
6 & 7 Geo. 5. c. 21	Marriage of British Subjects (Facilities) Amendment Act 1916	The whole act.
9 & 10 Geo. 5. c. 20	Scottish Board of Health Act 1919	Section 4(1)(g).
19 & 20 Geo. 5. c. 36	Age of Marriage Act 1929	The whole act.
2 & 3 Geo. 6. c. 33	Marriage Act 1939	Section 1. Section 2(2).
2 & 3 Geo. 6. c. 34	Marriage (Scotland) Act 1939	The whole act.
5 & 6 Geo. 6. c. 20	Marriage (Scotland) Act 1942	The whole act.
12 & 13 Geo. 6. c. 76	Marriage Act 1949	Section 37(2).
4 & 5 Eliz. 2. c. 70	Marriage (Scotland) Act 1956	Section 1(4). Sections 2 and 3. In section 4, the words from "and the" to the end.
6 & 7 Eliz. 2. c. 64	Local Government and Miscellaneous Financial Provisions (Scotland) Act 1958	Section 17.
8 & 9 Eliz. 2. c. 29	Marriage (Enabling) Act 1960	The whole act.
1965 c. 49	Registration of Births, Deaths and Marriages (Scotland) Act 1965	Part IV. In section 54, subsection (1)(c) and in subsection (2) the words "(c) or".

== Subsequent developments ==
The Marriage (Scotland) Act 2002 extended the availability of civil marriages to "approved places" in addition to Register Offices. The Marriage and Civil Partnership (Scotland) Act 2014 extended marriage to same-sex couples in Scotland.
