= Adoption (Scotland) Act 1978 =

Act of the Parliament of the United Kingdom

Adoption (Scotland) Act 1978 (Note: Section 67(1).)
- Act of Parliament
- Parliament of the United Kingdom
- Long title: An Act to consolidate the enactments relating to adoption in Scotland with amendments to give effect to recommendations of the Scottish Law Commission.
- Citation: 1978 c. 28
- Territorial extent: Scotland (Note: Section 67(4).)

Dates
- Royal assent: 20 July 1978
- Commencement: 1 February 1985 (Note: Section 67(2). The Adoption (Scotland) Act 1978 Commencement Order 1984 (SI 1984/1050).)
Other legislation
Amends	See § Repealed enactments
Repeals/revokes	See § Repealed enactments
Amended by	British Nationality Act 1981; Foster Children (Scotland) Act 1984; Law Reform (Miscellaneous Provisions) (Scotland) Act 1985; Law Reform (Parent and Child) (Scotland) Act 1986; Hong Kong (British Nationality) Order 1986; Social Security Act 1988; Child Support Act 1991; Children (Scotland) Act 1995; Adoption (Intercountry Aspects) Act 1999; Civil Partnership Act 2004; Family Law (Scotland) Act 2006; Adoption and Children (Scotland) Act 2007

Status: Partially repealed

Text of statute as originally enacted

Revised text of statute as amended

Text of the Adoption (Scotland) Act 1978 as in force today (including any amendments) within the United Kingdom, from legislation.gov.uk.

The Adoption (Scotland) Act 1978 (c. 28) is an act of the Parliament of the United Kingdom that consolidated enactments relating to adoption in Scotland.

== Provisions ==
=== Repealed enactments ===
Section 66(3) of the act repealed 13 enactments, listed in schedule 4 to the act.

Citation	Short title	Extent of repeal
7 & 8 Eliz. 2. c. 5	Adoption Act 1958	The whole act.
8 & 9 Eliz. 2. c. 59	Adoption Act 1960	The whole act.
1964 c. 41	Succession (Scotland) Act 1964	Section 24(4).
1964 c. 57	Adoption Act 1964	The whole act.
1965 c. 49	Registration of Births, Deaths and Marriages (Scotland) Act 1965	In Schedule 1, paragraphs 7 to 10.
1968 c. 49	Social Work (Scotland) Act 1968	In Schedule 8, paragraphs 37 to 41.
1968 c. 53	Adoption Act 1968	The whole act.
1969 c. 54	Children and Young Persons Act 1969	In Schedule 5, paragraphs 33 and 35.
1973 c. 65	Local Government (Scotland) Act 1973	In Schedule 27, paragraph 142.
1975 c. 72	Children Act 1975	Sections 1 to 32. Section 100(4), (5) and (9). In section 102(1), the words "Part I except section 24(6) or" and paragraph (a). In section 107(1), the definitions of "approved adoption society", "British adoption order", "British territory", "the Convention", "Convention adoption order", "Convention country" and "United Kingdom national", and, in the definition of "guardian", paragraph (b). Section 107(2A). Section 108(5) and (6). In Schedule 2, paragraphs 1 to 4, 5(1), (2) and (4), 6(1) and (3), and 7. In Schedule 3, paragraphs 17, 21 to 40, 44, 45 and 61 to 65.
1976 c. 36	Adoption Act 1976	Sections 22 and 23. Section 51(3). Section 73(2). In section 74(3), the words from "except" to "Schedule 3". In Schedule 3, paragraphs 25 to 44.
1977 c. 45	Criminal Law Act 1977	In Schedule 12, the entry relating to the Adoption Act 1958.
1978 c. 22	Domestic Proceedings and Magistrates' Courts Act 1978	Section 74(1) and (3). In section 90(2), the words "74(1) and (3)" and "17 and 18". In Schedule 2, paragraphs 17 and 18.

== Subsequent developments ==
The whole act was repealed (except Part IV) by section 121(2) of, and schedule 3 to, the Adoption and Children (Scotland) Act 2007, which came into force on 28 September 2009. (Note: The Adoption and Children (Scotland) Act 2007 (Commencement No. 4, Transitional and Savings Provisions) Order 2009 (SSI 2009/267).)
