= Adoption Act 1958 =

Act of the Parliament of the United Kingdom

Adoption Act 1958 (Note: Section 60(1).)
- Act of Parliament
- Parliament of the United Kingdom
- Long title: An Act to consolidate the enactments relating to the adoption of children.
- Citation: 7 & 8 Eliz. 2. c. 5
- Territorial extent: England and Wales; Scotland; (Note: Section 60(2).)

Dates
- Royal assent: 18 December 1958
- Commencement: 1 April 1959 (Note: Section 60(3).)
- Repealed: England and Wales: 1 January 1988 (Note: The Children Act 1975 and the Adoption Act 1976 (Commencement No. 2) Order 1987 (SI 1987/1242).); Scotland: 1 September 1984 (Note: The Adoption (Scotland) Act 1978 Commencement Order 1984 (SI 1984/1050).)
Other legislation
Repeals/revokes	Adoption Act 1950
Amended by	Adoption Act 1960; Mental Health (Scotland) Act 1960; Statute Law Revision (Consequential Repeals) Act 1965; Law Reform (Miscellaneous Provisions) (Scotland) Act 1966; Social Work (Scotland) Act 1968; Family Law Reform Act 1969; Statute Law (Repeals) Act 1969; Courts Act 1971; Statute Law (Repeals) Act 1974
Repealed by	England and Wales: Adoption Act 1976; Scotland: Adoption (Scotland) Act 1978
Relates to	Children Act 1958

Status: Repealed

Text of statute as originally enacted

The Adoption Act 1958 (7 & 8 Eliz. 2. c. 5) was an act of the Parliament of the United Kingdom that updated and consolidated the law relating to adoption. After receiving royal assent on 18 December 1958 it came into force on 1 April 1959, regulating requirements for adopters, requirements for adoption agencies and the procedure to be used when making or appealing a court decision on adoption. After the regulations on adoption procedure were sharply criticised, law in this area was reformed with the Adoption Act 1976, which repealed the 1958 act.

== Provisions ==
The act was created as a result of the report of the Hurst Committee, delivered in September 1954. The act was given royal assent on 18 December 1958, and came into effect on 1 April 1959. New regulations for adoption were created based on the act, and came into force on 17 April. It repealed or consolidated many statutes relating to adoption, including the Adoption Act 1950 and the Children Act 1958. It made several changes to the law governing consent of the natural parents, qualifications of adopters, adoption procedure and the procedure used in cases where the adoption is disputed.

Section 4 of the act governs consent, and says that people no longer have to give their consent if they were liable to contribute to the child's maintenance via a court order or agreement - for example, the father of an illegitimate child who pays child support. The consent of a local authority or school which has taken a child in is also not required, although under the regulations set up by the act they are to be consulted and given notice of the adoption procedure. If a person whose consent is normally required (such as a natural parent) consistently and repeatedly fails to discharge their duties as a parent or guardian, they also do not have to give their consent.

The Hurst Committee recommended that the emphasis for adoption should be on married couples, but this was not set down in the act. It was agreed that, except in certain special circumstances, single men should not be allowed to adopt children on their own. Joint adopters must be either 25 or at least 21 and the spouse of a 25-year-old, with this reduced to 21 in all circumstances if the adopter is a relative of the child. Medical reports must also be completed on the adopters if the child is below school leaving age, and similar (although far more detailed) reports must also be prepared for the child.

The act governed all procedure used in disputed adoption cases, and was designed to safeguard the interests of the child, natural parents and adopters. Application for a case may be made to the County Court, the High Court of Justice or the juvenile courts; in practice, the juvenile courts handled the most cases. The act also created a "provisional adoption order", issuable by the High Court or the County Court, which allows an applicant not domiciled in Britain to legally remove a British child for the purpose of adopting that child under the law of the country in which the applicants live. The Provisional Adoption Order required that the child was in the applicant's care in Britain for at least six months. Despite the name this was only a custody order, designed to act as a place holder until the applicant's nation authorised the adoption of the child. The order lasted either until the child was legally adopted or turned eighteen years old. The name caused problems as many who applied for a Provisional Adoption Order believed that they had been granted a full adoption order, despite legal advice otherwise. The result was that in the Adoption Act 1976 the name was changed to reflect its true nature.

In regards to adoption agencies, the act allows such agencies to place children not under their control with adopters, such as those looked after by local authorities. This required submitting local authorities to the same regulation as adoption agencies, and the act also allows them to "make and participate in arrangements for the adoption of children". Provisions that regulated the adoption procedure were sharply criticised, and the Houghton Committee reported in 1972 that significant reform was needed. This became the Adoption Act 1976, which along with the Adoption (Scotland) Act 1978 repealed the 1958 act in its entirety.

== Subsequent developments ==
Section 59(2) of, and schedule 6 to, the act were repealed by section 1 of, and part XI of the schedule to, the Statute Law (Repeals) Act 1974, which came into force on 27 June 1974.

The whole act was repealed for England and Wales by section 73(3) of, and schedule 4 to, the Adoption Act 1976, which came into force on 1 January 1988.

The whole act was repealed for Scotland by section 66(3) of, and schedule 4 to, the Adoption (Scotland) Act 1978, which came into force on 1 September 1984.

== Bibliography ==
- Barker, D.L.A. (2002). Law (11th ed.). Butterworth-Heinemann. ISBN 0-7506-5405-8.
- Brammer, Alison (2006). Social work law. Pearson Education. ISBN 1-4058-1205-2.
- Hall, Penelope (1998). The social services of modern England. Routledge. ISBN 0-415-17725-1.
- Stone, O.M. (1959). "Adoption Act 1958". Modern Law Review. 22 (5). Blackwell Publishing. ISSN 0026-7961.
