= Social Work (Scotland) Act 1968 =

Act of the Parliament of the United Kingdom

Social Work (Scotland) Act 1968 (Note: Section 99.)
- Act of Parliament
- Parliament of the United Kingdom
- Long title: An Act to make further provision for promoting social welfare in Scotland; to consolidate with amendments certain enactments relating to the care and protection of children; to amend the law relating to the supervision and care of persons put on probation or released from prison etc.; to restrict the prosecution of children for offences; to establish children's panels to provide children's hearings in the case of children requiring compulsory measures of care; and for purposes connected with the aforesaid matters.
- Citation: 1968 c. 49
- Territorial extent: Scotland (Note: Section 97(4). Certain provisions extend to England and Wales, Northern Ireland, and the Channel Islands; see section 97(1)–(3).)

Dates
- Royal assent: 26 July 1968
- Commencement: 1 April 1969 (various) (Note: Section 98(1). The Social Work (Scotland) Act 1968 (Commencement No. 1) Order 1969 (SI 1969/430).); 1 July 1969 (various) (Note: Section 98(1). The Social Work (Scotland) Act 1968 (Commencement No. 1) Order 1969 (SI 1969/430).); 17 November 1969 (various) (Note: Section 98(1). The Social Work (Scotland) Act 1968 (Commencement No. 2) Order 1969 (SI 1969/1274).); Various (1970) (Note: Section 98(1). The Social Work (Scotland) Act 1968 (Commencement No. 3) Order 1970 (SI 1970/196); the Social Work (Scotland) Act 1968 (Commencement No. 4) Order 1970 (SI 1970/846).); 1 March 1971 (rest of act) (Note: Section 98(1). The Social Work (Scotland) Act 1968 (Commencement No. 5) Order 1971 (SI 1971/184).); 1 April 1971 (section 14) (Note: Section 98(1). The Social Work (Scotland) Act 1968 (Commencement No. 6) Order 1971 (SI 1971/556).)
Other legislation
Amends	See § Repealed enactments
Repeals/revokes	See § Repealed enactments
Amended by	Tribunals and Inquiries Act 1971; Local Government (Scotland) Act 1973; Criminal Procedure (Scotland) Act 1975; Adoption (Scotland) Act 1978; Child Care Act 1980; Foster Children Act 1980; []Mental Health (Scotland) Act 1984; Foster Children (Scotland) Act 1984; Law Reform (Miscellaneous Provisions) (Scotland) Act 1985; Law Reform (Parent and Child) (Scotland) Act 1986; Legal Aid (Scotland) Act 1986; Debtors (Scotland) Act 1987; NHS and Community Care Act 1990; Statute Law (Repeals) Act 1993; Children (Scotland) Act 1995; Criminal Procedure (Consequential Provisions) (Scotland) Act 1995; Community Care and Health (Scotland) Act 2002; National Health Service (Consequential Provisions) Act 2006; Children's Hearings (Scotland) Act 2011; Sentencing Act 2020

Status: Partially repealed

Text of statute as originally enacted

Revised text of statute as amended

Text of the Social Work (Scotland) Act 1968 as in force today (including any amendments) within the United Kingdom, from legislation.gov.uk.

The Social Work (Scotland) Act 1968 (c. 49) is an act of the Parliament of the United Kingdom that made further provision for promoting social welfare and consolidated with amendments enactments relating to the care and protection of children in Scotland.

The act implemented the main recommendations of the Kilbrandon Report (1964) and established a new system of children's hearings to deal with children who may require compulsory measures of care, replacing the existing approved school and juvenile court arrangements in Scotland.

== Provisions ==
=== Repealed enactments ===
Section 95(2) of the act repealed 22 enactments, listed in parts I and II of schedule 9 to the act.

Part I – Repeals extending to Scotland only
Citation	Short title	Extent of repeal
1 Edw. 8 & 1 Geo. 6. c. 37	Children and Young Persons (Scotland) Act 1937	In section 21(2), the words from "may take" to the end of the subsection.
1 Edw. 8 & 1 Geo. 6. c. 37	Children and Young Persons (Scotland) Act 1937	In section 42(1), the words "or is for any other reason brought before a court" and in subsection (2), the words "or taken to a place of safety" and the words "or the person by whom he is taken to the place of safety, as the case may be".
1 Edw. 8 & 1 Geo. 6. c. 37	Children and Young Persons (Scotland) Act 1937	In section 47(1) the words "until he can be brought before a juvenile court", wherever occurring.
1 Edw. 8 & 1 Geo. 6. c. 37	Children and Young Persons (Scotland) Act 1937	In section 49(1), the words "either as being in need of care or protection or", the words "or otherwise", and the words "and for securing that proper provision is made for his education and training".
1 Edw. 8 & 1 Geo. 6. c. 37	Children and Young Persons (Scotland) Act 1937	Section 49(2).
1 Edw. 8 & 1 Geo. 6. c. 37	Children and Young Persons (Scotland) Act 1937	Section 51.
1 Edw. 8 & 1 Geo. 6. c. 37	Children and Young Persons (Scotland) Act 1937	Section 53(2) and (3).
1 Edw. 8 & 1 Geo. 6. c. 37	Children and Young Persons (Scotland) Act 1937	Section 59(1) and in subsection (4), the words "under this section, or".
1 Edw. 8 & 1 Geo. 6. c. 37	Children and Young Persons (Scotland) Act 1937	Sections 60 and 61.
1 Edw. 8 & 1 Geo. 6. c. 37	Children and Young Persons (Scotland) Act 1937	In section 63(3) the words "under the Probation of Offenders Act 1907".
1 Edw. 8 & 1 Geo. 6. c. 37	Children and Young Persons (Scotland) Act 1937	Sections 65 and 66.
1 Edw. 8 & 1 Geo. 6. c. 37	Children and Young Persons (Scotland) Act 1937	Sections 68 to 86.
1 Edw. 8 & 1 Geo. 6. c. 37	Children and Young Persons (Scotland) Act 1937	Sections 88 to 98.
1 Edw. 8 & 1 Geo. 6. c. 37	Children and Young Persons (Scotland) Act 1937	Section 101(5) and (6).
1 Edw. 8 & 1 Geo. 6. c. 37	Children and Young Persons (Scotland) Act 1937	Section 106.
1 Edw. 8 & 1 Geo. 6. c. 37	Children and Young Persons (Scotland) Act 1937	Section 107(1)(a), and (2).
1 Edw. 8 & 1 Geo. 6. c. 37	Children and Young Persons (Scotland) Act 1937	Section 109.
1 Edw. 8 & 1 Geo. 6. c. 37	Children and Young Persons (Scotland) Act 1937	In section 110(1)—the following definitions—"Approved school"; "Approved school order"; "Headmaster"; "In need of care or protection"; in the definition of "Justice" the words "(except in section 51 of this Act)"; and the definition of "Managers".
1 Edw. 8 & 1 Geo. 6. c. 37	Children and Young Persons (Scotland) Act 1937	In section 110, in subsection (3)(a)(ii) the words "and the juvenile court for any area" and subsection (3)(a)(iv).
1 Edw. 8 & 1 Geo. 6. c. 37	Children and Young Persons (Scotland) Act 1937	Section 111.
1 Edw. 8 & 1 Geo. 6. c. 37	Children and Young Persons (Scotland) Act 1937	Section 112.
1 Edw. 8 & 1 Geo. 6. c. 37	Children and Young Persons (Scotland) Act 1937	Schedule 2.
1 Edw. 8 & 1 Geo. 6. c. 37	Children and Young Persons (Scotland) Act 1937	Schedule 3.
11 & 12 Geo. 6. c. 29	National Assistance Act 1948	Section 21.
11 & 12 Geo. 6. c. 29	National Assistance Act 1948	Section 22(1).
11 & 12 Geo. 6. c. 29	National Assistance Act 1948	Sections 23 and 24.
11 & 12 Geo. 6. c. 29	National Assistance Act 1948	Section 26(1) and (5).
11 & 12 Geo. 6. c. 29	National Assistance Act 1948	Section 27.
11 & 12 Geo. 6. c. 29	National Assistance Act 1948	Sections 29 and 30.
11 & 12 Geo. 6. c. 29	National Assistance Act 1948	Section 32.
11 & 12 Geo. 6. c. 29	National Assistance Act 1948	Sections 34 to 40.
11 & 12 Geo. 6. c. 29	National Assistance Act 1948	Section 50(3).
11 & 12 Geo. 6. c. 29	National Assistance Act 1948	Section 58(1) and (4).
11 & 12 Geo. 6. c. 43	Children Act 1948	The whole act.
12, 13 & 14 Geo. 6. c. 94	Criminal Justice (Scotland) Act 1949	Section 2(3) and (9).
12, 13 & 14 Geo. 6. c. 94	Criminal Justice (Scotland) Act 1949	Section 4(2) and (3).
12, 13 & 14 Geo. 6. c. 94	Criminal Justice (Scotland) Act 1949	Section 5(3).
12, 13 & 14 Geo. 6. c. 94	Criminal Justice (Scotland) Act 1949	In section 7, in subsection (2), the words from "to omit" to "and", and in subsection (4), the words "to (3)".
12, 13 & 14 Geo. 6. c. 94	Criminal Justice (Scotland) Act 1949	Sections 11 to 13.
12, 13 & 14 Geo. 6. c. 94	Criminal Justice (Scotland) Act 1949	In section 28, subsection (2), and in subsection (3), the words "a remand home or" and the words "home or".
12, 13 & 14 Geo. 6. c. 94	Criminal Justice (Scotland) Act 1949	Sections 50 and 51.
12, 13 & 14 Geo. 6. c. 94	Criminal Justice (Scotland) Act 1949	Sections 69 to 73.
12, 13 & 14 Geo. 6. c. 94	Criminal Justice (Scotland) Act 1949	In section 75, subsections (1)(a), (3)(a) to (d) and (4) to (6).
12, 13 & 14 Geo. 6. c. 94	Criminal Justice (Scotland) Act 1949	In section 78, in subsection (1)—in the definition of "appropriate court" the words "or supervision" and the words "or person under supervision"; and the following definitions—"Approved probation hostel" and "Approved probation home"; "Approved school"; "Remand home"; "Salaried probation officer"; in the definition of "sentence", the words from "an order for custody" to the end of the definition; the following definitions—"Supervision order"; "Voluntary probation officer"; "Whole-time probation officer"; and "Young person".
12, 13 & 14 Geo. 6. c. 94	Criminal Justice (Scotland) Act 1949	Schedule 1.
12, 13 & 14 Geo. 6. c. 94	Criminal Justice (Scotland) Act 1949	In Schedule 2, in paragraph 2, in sub-paragraph (3), the words "appointed by the appropriate court,", in sub-paragraph (4)(b), the words "named therein", in paragraph 3(b) the words "an approved probation hostel or home or in" and the word "other" and paragraph 7.
12, 13 & 14 Geo. 6. c. 94	Criminal Justice (Scotland) Act 1949	Schedule 3.
14 Geo. 6. c. 37	Maintenance Orders Act 1950	Schedule 1, so far as relating to the modification of the Children and Young Persons (Scotland) Act 1937.
15 & 16 Geo. 6 & 1 Eliz. 2. c. 61	Prisons (Scotland) Act 1952	Section 18(1) to (3A).
15 & 16 Geo. 6 & 1 Eliz. 2. c. 61	Prisons (Scotland) Act 1952	In section 32, in subsection (3), the words "who is not less than seventeen years of age", and subsection (4).
4 & 5 Eliz. 2. c. 24	Children and Young Persons Act 1956	The whole act.
4 & 5 Eliz. 2. c. 50	Family Allowances and National Insurance Act 1956	The whole act.
5 & 6 Eliz. 2. c. 1	Police, Fire and Probation Officers Remuneration Act 1956	In section 1(1)(d), the words from "or" to "1949".
6 & 7 Eliz. 2. c. 40	Matrimonial Proceedings (Children) Act 1958	Section 11(2) and (3).
6 & 7 Eliz. 2. c. 40	Matrimonial Proceedings (Children) Act 1958	In section 12(1), the words "of a probation officer or", and section 12(3).
6 & 7 Eliz. 2. c. 65	Children Act 1958	Section 1.
6 & 7 Eliz. 2. c. 65	Children Act 1958	Section 2(6) and (7).
7 & 8 Eliz. 2. c. 5	Adoption Act 1958	Section 4(3)(b).
7 & 8 Eliz. 2. c. 5	Adoption Act 1958	In section 11(1), the words "or juvenile court".
7 & 8 Eliz. 2. c. 5	Adoption Act 1958	In section 15(3), the words from "or the Children" to "1937".
7 & 8 Eliz. 2. c. 5	Adoption Act 1958	In section 37(3), the words "in an approved school or".
8 & 9 Eliz. 2. c. 61	Mental Health (Scotland) Act 1960	Sections 8 and 9.
8 & 9 Eliz. 2. c. 61	Mental Health (Scotland) Act 1960	In section 10, in subsection (1), in paragraph (a), head (i), and at the end of head (ii) the word "or".
8 & 9 Eliz. 2. c. 61	Mental Health (Scotland) Act 1960	Section 12(2).
8 & 9 Eliz. 2. c. 61	Mental Health (Scotland) Act 1960	Sections 19 to 21.
8 & 9 Eliz. 2. c. 61	Mental Health (Scotland) Act 1960	Section 46(a).
8 & 9 Eliz. 2. c. 61	Mental Health (Scotland) Act 1960	In section 55(10), the words from "including" to the word "school".
8 & 9 Eliz. 2. c. 61	Mental Health (Scotland) Act 1960	Section 56.
8 & 9 Eliz. 2. c. 61	Mental Health (Scotland) Act 1960	In section 57, in subsection (3)(b), the words "or young person"; and subsection (5).
8 & 9 Eliz. 2. c. 61	Mental Health (Scotland) Act 1960	Section 69(1)(b).
8 & 9 Eliz. 2. c. 61	Mental Health (Scotland) Act 1960	Section 71.
8 & 9 Eliz. 2. c. 61	Mental Health (Scotland) Act 1960	In section 72, the definitions of "approved school" and "remand home" and in the definition of "place of safety" the words "or young person" first occurring.
8 & 9 Eliz. 2. c. 61	Mental Health (Scotland) Act 1960	In section 111(1), the definition of "residential home for persons suffering from mental disorder;".
10 & 11 Eliz. 2. c. 47	Education (Scotland) Act 1962	Section 36(4) and (5).
10 & 11 Eliz. 2. c. 47	Education (Scotland) Act 1962	Section 44(3) and (4).
10 & 11 Eliz. 2. c. 47	Education (Scotland) Act 1962	Section 80(1)(e).
10 & 11 Eliz. 2. c. 47	Education (Scotland) Act 1962	In section 104 the words "(including an approved school)".
1963 c. 37	Children and Young Persons Act 1963	Section 1.
1963 c. 37	Children and Young Persons Act 1963	Sections 45 to 52.
1963 c. 37	Children and Young Persons Act 1963	Section 58.
1963 c. 39	Criminal Justice (Scotland) Act 1963	In section 11, in subsection (2), the words from "if the offender" to the words "detention centre", and subsections (3) and (5).
1963 c. 39	Criminal Justice (Scotland) Act 1963	Section 15.
1963 c. 39	Criminal Justice (Scotland) Act 1963	Part II.
1963 c. 39	Criminal Justice (Scotland) Act 1963	Schedule 2.
1968 c. 46	Health Services and Public Health Act 1968	Section 13.
1968 c. 46	Health Services and Public Health Act 1968	Section 44.
1968 c. 46	Health Services and Public Health Act 1968	Section 45.

Part II – Repeals extending to England and Wales
Citation	Short title	Extent of repeal
23 & 24 Geo. 5. c. 12	Children and Young Persons Act 1933	In section 78(2) and (4), the words from "(including" to "1937)".
23 & 24 Geo. 5. c. 12	Children and Young Persons Act 1933	In section 82(1), the words from "or" to "1937", and in the proviso, the words from "or where" to "Wales".
23 & 24 Geo. 5. c. 12	Children and Young Persons Act 1933	In section 83(1), (2) and (4), the words "Scotland or" wherever occurring, and in subsection (5) the words from "in relation to Scotland" to "Department, and".
23 & 24 Geo. 5. c. 12	Children and Young Persons Act 1933	In section 85(1) and (2), the words "or under the Children and Young Persons (Scotland) Act 1937".
23 & 24 Geo. 5. c. 12	Children and Young Persons Act 1933	In Schedule 4, in paragraph 9, in sub-paragraph (1), the words from "or with the consent" to "to that Act", paragraph 9(3), and in paragraph 13, the words "or of the Children and Young Persons (Scotland) Act 1937" in both places where they occur.
6 & 7 Eliz. 2. c. 65	Children Act 1958	In section 2(4), the words from "or of" to "1937".
6 & 7 Eliz. 2. c. 65	Children Act 1958	In section 17, in the definition of "fit person order", the words "or" to "1937".
7 & 8 Eliz. 2. c. 72	Mental Health Act 1959	In section 10(1), in sub-paragraph (a), head (ii).
7 & 8 Eliz. 2. c. 72	Mental Health Act 1959	In section 50, sub-paragraph (b).
1963 c. 37	Children and Young Persons Act 1963	In section 12, the words "Scotland or".
1963 c. 37	Children and Young Persons Act 1963	In section 45(1), the words "the Children and Young Persons (Scotland) Acts 1937 and 1956".
1963 c. 37	Children and Young Persons Act 1963	Sections 51 and 52.
1963 c. 37	Children and Young Persons Act 1963	Section 53(1)(b).
1965 c. 53	Family Allowances Act 1965	In section 11, subsection (1)(a)(ii), in subsection (1)(c), the words "or an order under section 73(2) of the said Act of 1937", and in subsection (2), the words "or the said Act of 1937".
