= Mental Health (Scotland) Act 1960 =

Act of the Parliament of the United Kingdom

Mental Health (Scotland) Act 1960 (Note: Section 118.)
- Act of Parliament
- Parliament of the United Kingdom
- Long title: An Act to repeal the Lunacy (Scotland) Acts, 1857 to 1913, and the Mental Deficiency (Scotland) Acts, 1913 and 1940; to make fresh provision with respect to the reception, care and treatment of persons suffering, or appearing to be suffering, from mental disorder, and with respect to their property and affairs; and for purposes connected with the matters aforesaid.
- Citation: 8 & 9 Eliz. 2. c. 61
- Territorial extent: Scotland (Note: Sections 114 and 116 extend certain provisions to England and Wales and Northern Ireland respectively.)

Dates
- Royal assent: 29 July 1960
- Commencement: 1 June 1962 (Note: Section 117(1). By order of the Secretary of State.)
- Repealed: 30 September 1984
Other legislation
Amends	Titles to Land Consolidation (Scotland) Act 1868; See § Repealed enactments
Repeals/revokes	See § Repealed enactments
Amended by	Statute Law Revision Act 1963; Matrimonial Causes Act 1965; Social Work (Scotland) Act 1968; Friendly Societies Act 1971; Statute Law (Repeals) Act 1973; Statute Law (Repeals) Act 1974; Statute Law (Repeals) Act 1975; Criminal Procedure (Scotland) Act 1975; House of Commons Disqualification Act 1975; Statute Law (Repeals) Act 1976; Statute Law (Repeals) Act 1977; Foster Children Act 1980; Residential Homes Act 1980; Statute Law (Repeals) Act 1981; Mental Health (Amendment) (Scotland) Act 1983; Foster Children (Scotland) Act 1984
Repealed by	Mental Health (Scotland) Act 1984
Relates to	Mental Health Act 1959

Status: Repealed

Text of statute as originally enacted

The Mental Health (Scotland) Act 1960 (8 & 9 Eliz. 2. c. 61) was an act of the Parliament of the United Kingdom that made fresh provision with respect to the reception, care and treatment of persons suffering from mental disorder in Scotland, repealing the Lunacy (Scotland) Acts 1857 to 1913 and the Mental Deficiency (Scotland) Acts 1913 and 1940.

The Mental Health Act 1959 (7 & 8 Eliz. 2. c. 72) made similar provisions for England and Wales.

== Provisions ==
=== Repealed enactments ===
Section 113(2) of the act repealed 34 enactments, listed in the fifth schedule to the act.

Citation	Short title	Extent of repeal
51 Geo. 3. c. 37	Marriage of Lunatics Act 1811	The whole act so far as it extends to Scotland.
20 & 21 Vict. c. 71	Lunacy (Scotland) Act 1857	The whole act.
25 & 26 Vict. c. 54	Lunacy (Scotland) Act 1862	The whole act.
27 & 28 Vict. c. 59	Lunacy Board (Scotland) Act 1864	The whole act.
29 & 30 Vict. c. 51	Lunacy (Scotland) Act 1866	The whole act.
34 & 35 Vict. c. 55	Criminal and Dangerous Lunatics (Scotland) Amendment Act 1871	The whole act.
47 & 48 Vict. c. 46	Naval Enlistment Act 1884	Section three.
48 & 49 Vict. c. 61	Secretary for Scotland Act 1885	In the Schedule, in Part I, the entry relating to lunacy.
48 & 49 Vict. c. 69	Criminal Law Amendment Act 1885	In section five, paragraph (2) so far as it extends to Scotland.
52 & 53 Vict. c. 50	Local Government (Scotland) Act 1889	In section eleven, in paragraph (5), head (ii).
53 & 54 Vict. c. 5	Lunacy Act 1890	The whole act so far as it extends to Scotland and Northern Ireland.
63 & 64 Vict. c. 54	Lunacy Board (Scotland) Salaries and Clerks Act 1900	The whole act.
3 & 4 Geo. 5. c. 38	Mental Deficiency and Lunacy (Scotland) Act 1913	The whole act.
19 & 20 Geo. 5. c. 25	Local Government (Scotland) Act 1929	In section eleven, subsection (4); in section seventy-seven, in subsection (1), in the definition of "Central Department", paragraph (c).
25 & 26 Geo. 5. c. 32	Criminal Lunatics (Scotland) Act 1935	The whole act.
2 & 3 Geo. 6. c. 20	Reorganisation of Offices (Scotland) Act 1939	Section two.
3 & 4 Geo. 6. c. 8	Mental Deficiency (Scotland) Act 1940	The whole act.
8 & 9 Geo. 6. c. 37	Education (Scotland) Act 1945	In the Fourth Schedule, the amendments to the Mental Deficiency and Lunacy (Scotland) Act, 1913.
9 & 10 Geo. 6. c. 72	Education (Scotland) Act 1946	In section fifty-six, subsection (6); section fifty-eight; in section one hundred and forty, in subsection (2), paragraphs (b), (c), (d), and (e); in section one hundred and forty-three, in subsection (1), the definition of "Mental Deficiency Acts."
10 & 11 Geo. 6. c. 27	National Health Service (Scotland) Act 1947	In section sixteen, in subsection (1), the words "or mental deficiency"; in section seventeen, in subsection (1), the words "or mental deficiency"; in section twenty-seven, in subsection (1), the words "or mental deficiency"; in section twenty-eight, in subsection (1), the words "mentally defective"; Part V; in section eighty, in subsection (1) in the definition of "hospital", the words "or mental deficiency" and the definition of "mental defective"; the Ninth Schedule.
11 & 12 Geo. 6. c. 29	National Assistance Act 1948	In section thirty-seven, in the proviso to subsection (9), paragraphs (b) and (c), and the word "or" at the end of paragraph (a); in the Sixth Schedule, in paragraph 7, sub-paragraph (2), and in paragraph 9, head (a) of sub-paragraph (3).
12, 13 & 14 Geo. 6. c. 19	Education (Scotland) Act 1949	In the Schedule, in Part I, the amendments to the Mental Deficiency and Lunacy (Scotland) Act, 1913, and the National Health Service (Scotland) Act, 1947.
12, 13 & 14 Geo. 6. c. 93	National Health Service (Amendment) Act 1949	Section twenty-seven.
12, 13 & 14 Geo. 6. c. 94	Criminal Justice (Scotland) Act 1949	In section three, in subsection (3), the words "or can be" and "as a voluntary boarder or", in subsection (4), the words "as a voluntary boarder or"; in section four, in subsection (2), the words "voluntary boarder or"; in section thirteen, in subsection (1) the words "voluntary boarder or"; sections twenty-three to twenty-five; in section twenty-seven, subsection (5); sections fifty-two, sixty-three, sixty-four and sixty-five; in section seventy-five, in subsection (2) the words from the beginning to "Treasury, and "; in the Third Schedule, in paragraph 3, in head (d) of sub-paragraph (1), the words "voluntary or"; in the Eleventh Schedule, the amendments to the Mental Deficiency and Lunacy (Scotland) Act, 1913.
15 & 16 Geo. 6 & 1 Eliz. 2. c. 61	Prisons (Scotland) Act 1952	In the Third Schedule, the amendments to the Mental Deficiency and Lunacy (Scotland) Act, 1913.
1 & 2 Eliz. 2. c. 25	Local Government Superannuation Act 1953	In section fifteen, in subsection (1), in paragraph (b), the words "and V".
3 & 4 Eliz. 2. c. 18	Army Act 1955	Section sixteen.
3 & 4 Eliz. 2. c. 19	Air Force Act 1955	Section sixteen.
3 & 4 Eliz. 2. c. 20	Revision of the Army and Air Force Acts (Transitional Provisions) Act 1955	In the Second Schedule, paragraph 2 (entry relating to the Naval Enlistment Act, 1884); sub-paragraph (6) of paragraph 13; sub-paragraph (6) of paragraph 14; sub-paragraph (3) of paragraph 18.
5 & 6 Eliz. 2. c. 20	House of Commons Disqualification Act 1957	In the First Schedule, in Part I, the following entry: "The General Board of Control for Scotland".
6 & 7 Eliz. 2. c. 40	Matrimonial Proceedings (Children) Act 1958	In section ten, subsection (5).
6 & 7 Eliz. 2. c. 65	Children Act 1958	In section two, subsection (5).
7 & 8 Eliz. 2. c. 5	Adoption Act 1958	In section thirty-seven, in subsection (3), the words "or subsection (5)".
7 & 8 Eliz. 2. c. 72	Mental Health Act 1959	Sections eighty-two to eighty-four; in section eighty-five, in subsection (3), the words "or placed" in each place where they occur; section ninety-one; in section one hundred and thirty-three, subsection (3); in section one hundred and fifty, the words "to eighty-four, section ninety-one", "section one hundred and thirty-three"; in the Sixth Schedule, in sub-paragraphs (1) of paragraphs 8 and 12, the words "In relation to", the words from "and the other" to the end of the sub-paragraphs; in the Seventh Schedule, in Part I, the amendment to the Recall of Army and Air Force Pensioners Act, 1948, and, in Part II, the amendments to the Naval Enlistment Act, 1884, the Army Act, 1955, the Air Force Act, 1955, and the Revision of the Army and Air Force Acts (Transitional Provisions) Act, 1955.

== Subsequent developments ==
The whole act was repealed by section 127(2) of, and schedule 5 to, the Mental Health (Scotland) Act 1984, which came into force on 30 September 1984.
