= Children Act 1948 =

Act of the Parliament of the United Kingdom

Children Act 1948 (Note: Section 62(1).)
- Act of Parliament
- Parliament of the United Kingdom
- Long title: An Act to make further provision for the care or welfare, up to the age of eighteen and, in certain cases, for further periods, of boys and girls when they are without parents or have been lost or abandoned by, or are living away from, their parents, or when their parents are unfit or unable to take care of them and in certain other circumstances, to amend the Children and Young Persons Act, 1933, the Children and Young Persons (Scotland) Act, 1937, the Guardianship of Infants Act, 1925 and certain other enactments relating to children; and for purposes connected with the matters aforesaid.
- Citation: 11 & 12 Geo. 6. c. 43
- Territorial extent: England and Wales; Scotland; (Note: Section 62(3).)

Dates
- Royal assent: 30 June 1948
- Commencement: 5 July 1948 (Note: Section 62(2).)
- Repealed: England and Wales: 1 April 1980 (Note: The Child Care Act 1980 (Commencement) Order 1980 (SI 1980/1935).); Scotland: 15 April 1971 (Note: The Social Work (Scotland) Act 1968 (Commencement No. 2) Order 1969 (SI 1969/1274) and Social Work (Scotland) Act 1968 (Commencement No. 5) Order 1971 (SI 1971/184)))
Other legislation
| Amends | Children and Young Persons (Scotland) Act 1937 |
| Amended by | Criminal Justice (Scotland) Act 1949; Justices of the Peace Act 1949; Adoption Act 1950; Magistrates' Courts Act 1952; Statute Law Revision Act 1953; Children Act 1958; Mental Health Act 1959; Statute Law Revision (Consequential Repeals) Act 1965; Guardianship of Minors Act 1971; Statute Law (Repeals) Act 1977 |
| Repealed by | England and Wales: Child Care Act 1980; Scotland: Social Work (Scotland) Act 1968 |

Status: Repealed

Text of statute as originally enacted

The Children Act 1948 (11 & 12 Geo. 6. c. 43) was an act of the Parliament of the United Kingdom that established a comprehensive childcare service. The law followed the Curtis Report, which addressed child welfare and was released by a government committee headed by Myra Curtis. The Act was strongly influenced by the inquiry into the Dennis O'Neill case. The law reformed the services available to deprived children, consolidating existing childcare legislation and establishing departments "in which professional social work practice would develop in child care and, in due course, in work with families". The act made it clear that it was the duty of local authorities to receive into care any child who was without parents or whose parents could not care for him for any reason, if it was in the interest of the child’s welfare.

The new duties imposed upon local authorities by the legislation (particularly to receive deprived children into care) resulted in childcare services working more closely with families. The act also led to a new approach towards parent-child relations, encouraging the newly established Children’s Departments "to view children as individual human beings with both shared and individualised needs, rather than an indistinct mass".

== Subsequent developments ==
The whole act was repealed for Scotland by section 95(2) of, and part I of schedule 9 to, the Social Work (Scotland) Act 1968, which came into force on 17 November 1969 and 15 April 1971.

The whole act was repealed for England and Wales by section 89(3) of, and schedule 6 to, the Child Care Act 1980, which came into force on 1 April 1980.
