= Child Care Act 1980 =

Act of the Parliament of the United Kingdom

Child Care Act 1980 (Note: Section 91(1).)
- Act of Parliament
- Parliament of the United Kingdom
- Long title: An Act to consolidate certain enactments relating to the care of children by local authorities or voluntary organisations and certain other enactments relating to the care of children.
- Citation: 1980 c. 5
- Territorial extent: England and Wales (Note: Section 91(2).)

Dates
- Royal assent: 31 January 1980
- Commencement: 1 April 1981 (Note: Section 90(1). The Child Care Act 1980 (Commencement) Order 1980 (SI 1980/1935).)
- Repealed: 14 October 1991 (Note: The Children Act 1989 (Commencement and Transitional Provisions) Order 1991 (SI 1991/828).)
Other legislation
Amends	See § Repealed enactments
Repeals/revokes	See § Repealed enactments
Amended by	Magistrates' Courts Act 1980; Mental Health (Scotland) Act 1984; Foster Children (Scotland) Act 1984; Family Law Reform Act 1987; Legal Aid Act 1988
Repealed by	Children Act 1989
Relates to	Foster Children Act 1980

Status: Repealed

Text of statute as originally enacted

Revised text of statute as amended

The Child Care Act 1980 (c. 5) was an act of the Parliament of the United Kingdom that consolidated enactments relating to the care of children by local authorities or voluntary organisations in England and Wales.

== Provisions ==
=== Repealed enactments ===
Section 89(3) of the act repealed 23 enactments, listed in schedule 6 to the act.

Enactments repealed by section 89(3)
Citation	Short title	Extent of repeal
23 & 24 Geo. 5. c. 12	Children and Young Persons Act 1933	Sections 86 to 89.
23 & 24 Geo. 5. c. 12	Children and Young Persons Act 1933	Sections 92 and 93.
23 & 24 Geo. 5. c. 12	Children and Young Persons Act 1933	In section 102(1), paragraphs (c) and (d).
23 & 24 Geo. 5. c. 12	Children and Young Persons Act 1933	In section 106(2), paragraph (c).
23 & 24 Geo. 5. c. 12	Children and Young Persons Act 1933	In section 107(1) the definition of "commission area".
11 & 12 Geo. 6. c. 43	Children Act 1948	The whole act.
12, 13 & 14 Geo. 6. c. 98	Adoption of Children Act 1949	In section 13(2) the words "subsection (1) of section fifty-nine of the Children Act 1948 and ".
14 Geo. 6. c. 37	Maintenance Orders Act 1950	In section 3(1) the words " section twenty-six of the Children Act 1948 ".
14 Geo. 6. c. 37	Maintenance Orders Act 1950	In section 4(1), paragraph (a) and in section 4(2) the words " the said section eighty-seven."
14 Geo. 6. c. 37	Maintenance Orders Act 1950	Section 14.
14 Geo. 6. c. 37	Maintenance Orders Act 1950	Schedule 1.
15 & 16 Geo. 6 & 1 Eliz. 2. c. 55	Magistrates' Courts Act 1952	In section 56(1), paragraphs (b) and (d).
6 & 7 Eliz. 2. c. 55	Local Government Act 1958	In Schedule 8, paragraph 2.
6 & 7 Eliz. 2. c. 65	Children Act 1958	In Schedule 2, the entry relating to section 38 of the Children Act 1948.
1963 c. 37	Children and Young Persons Act 1963	Sections 1, 30, 45, 46, 47; 49, 55 and 58.
1963 c. 37	Children and Young Persons Act 1963	In Schedule 3, paragraphs 38 and 40.
1967 c. 80	Criminal Justice Act 1967	In Part I of Schedule 3, the entries relating to section 88(2)(c) of the Children and Young Persons Act 1933, section 10(4) of the Children Act 1948 and section 30(5) of the Children and Young Persons Act 1963.
1968 c. 46	Health Services and Public Health Act 1968	In section 64(3)(a), sub-paragraph (iv) and in sub-paragraph (xiv) the words from "except so far as " to the end of the sub-paragraph.
1968 c. 46	Health Services and Public Health Act 1968	In section 65(3)(b), sub-paragraph (iv).
1968 c. 49	Social Work (Scotland) Act 1968	In Schedule 8, paragraphs 17 and 19.
1969 c. 54	Children and Young Persons Act 1969	Sections 24 and 27.
1969 c. 54	Children and Young Persons Act 1969	In section 32(1), paragraphs (a) and (c), the words " the local authority or" in the first place where those words occur, the words " the local authority or the managers of the home or ", and the words " or managers " in both places where those words occur.
1969 c. 54	Children and Young Persons Act 1969	Sections 35 to 45.
1969 c. 54	Children and Young Persons Act 1969	Sections 47 to 50.
1969 c. 54	Children and Young Persons Act 1969	Sections 58 and 59.
1969 c. 54	Children and Young Persons Act 1969	Sections 62 to 64A.
1969 c. 54	Children and Young Persons Act 1969	Section 65(1).
1969 c. 54	Children and Young Persons Act 1969	In section 69(1) the words " 39 or 43(5) " and " 47 ".
1969 c. 54	Children and Young Persons Act 1969	In section 70(1) the definition of " instrument of management ", "planning area", " regional plan ", " the relevant authorities ", " trust deed", "voluntary home" and " voluntary organisation ".
1969 c. 54	Children and Young Persons Act 1969	Schedule 2.
1969 c. 54	Children and Young Persons Act 1969	In Schedule 5, paragraphs 8 to 10, 14 to 17, 19 to 22, 50 to 52 and 73.
1970 c. 31	Administration of Justice Act 1970	In Schedule 1, the words " Proceedings on appeal under section 4A of the Children Act 1948 ".
1970 c. 42	Local Authority Social Services Act 1970	In Schedule 1, the entries relating to the Children Act 1948 and Part III of the Children and Young Persons Act 1963, in the entry relating to Part I of the said Act of 1963 the words " Promotion of welfare of children " and " recovery of contributions in respect of child " and in the entry relating to the Children and Young Persons Act 1969 the words "accommodation for children in care ".
1970 c. 42	Local Authority Social Services Act 1970	In Schedule 2, paragraphs 5 and 11.
1972 c. 70	Local Government Act 1972	In Schedule 23, paragraph 3.
1973 c. 18	Matrimonial Causes Act 1973	In section 43, subsection (8).
1973 c. 18	Matrimonial Causes Act 1973	In Schedule 2, paragraph 9.
1974 c. 4	Legal Aid Act 1974	In Schedule 1, in paragraph 3(c) the words " section 2 or 4 of the Children Act 1948."
1975 c. 18	Social Security (Consequential Provisions) Act 1975	In Schedule 2, paragraph 9.
1975 c. 37	Nursing Homes Act 1975	In Schedule 1, paragraph 5.
1975 c. 72	Children Act 1975	Sections 56 to 63.
1975 c. 72	Children Act 1975	Sections 67, 71 and 98.
1975 c. 72	Children Act 1975	In Schedule 3, paragraphs 4 to 6, 42, 71, 72 and 73(1)(a).
1976 c. 36	Adoption Act 1976	In Schedule 3, paragraphs 1, 2, 3, 12, 13 and 20.
1977 c. 45	Criminal Law Act 1977	In Schedule 6 the entry relating to the Children Act 1948.
1978 c. 22	Domestic Proceedings and Magistrates' Courts Act 1978	In Schedule 2, paragraphs 3, 4, 5, 8, 20 and 24.

== Subsequent developments ==
The whole act was repealed by section 108(7) of, and schedule 15 to, the Children Act 1989, which came into force on 14 October 1991.
