= Nurseries and Child-Minders Regulation Act 1948 =

Act of the Parliament of the United Kingdom

Nurseries and Child-Minders Regulation Act 1948 (Note: Section 13(1).)
- Act of Parliament
- Parliament of the United Kingdom
- Long title: An Act to provide for the regulation of certain nurseries and of persons who for reward receive children into their homes to look after them; and for purposes connected with the matters aforesaid.
- Citation: 11 & 12 Geo. 6. c. 53
- Territorial extent: England and Wales; Scotland; (Note: Section 13(4).)

Dates
- Royal assent: 30 July 1948
- Commencement: 30 July 1948 (Note: The Acts of Parliament (Commencement) Act 1793.)
- Repealed: 14 October 1991 (Note: The Children Act 1989 (Commencement and Transitional Provisions) Order 1991 (SI 1991/828).)
Other legislation
Amended by	Children Act 1958
Repealed by	Children Act 1989

Status: Repealed

Text of statute as originally enacted

The Nurseries and Child-Minders Regulation Act 1948 (11 & 12 Geo. 6. c. 53) was an act of the Parliament of the United Kingdom. It formally recognised the existence of childminding, and introduced provisions for the registration of child-minders and the inspection of premises. This legislation laid down, for the first time, minimum standards required for people caring for the children of other people in their own homes for "reward".
