= Tribunals and Inquiries Act 1971 =

Act of the Parliament of the United Kingdom

Tribunals and Inquiries Act 1971 (Note: Section 20(1).)
- Act of Parliament
- Parliament of the United Kingdom
- Long title: An Act to consolidate the Tribunals and Inquiries Acts 1958 and 1966 as amended.
- Citation: 1971 c. 62
- Territorial extent: United Kingdom (Note: Section 20(3).)

Dates
- Royal assent: 27 July 1971
- Commencement: 27 August 1971 (Note: Section 20(2).)
- Repealed: 1 October 1992
Other legislation
Amends	See § Repealed enactments
Repeals/revokes	See § Repealed enactments
Amended by	Town and Country Planning (Scotland) Act 1972; Statute Law (Repeals) Act 1977; Rent Act 1977; Administration of Justice Act 1977; Road Traffic Regulation Act 1984; Reserve Forces (Safeguard of Employment) Act 1985; Statute Law (Repeals) Act 1986; British Steel Act 1988
Repealed by	Tribunals and Inquiries Act 1992

Status: Repealed

Text of statute as originally enacted

Revised text of statute as amended

The Tribunals and Inquiries Act 1971 (c. 62) was an act of the Parliament of the United Kingdom that consolidated enactments relating to tribunals and inquiries in the United Kingdom.

== Provisions ==
=== Repealed enactments ===
Section 18(2) of the act repealed 15 enactments and revoked 15 instruments, listed in parts I and II of schedule 4 to the act, respectively.

Part I – Enactments repealed by section 18(2)
Citation	Short title	Extent of repeal
6 & 7 Eliz. 2. c. 66	Tribunals and Inquiries Act 1958	The whole act except sections 1(8) and 17.
7 & 8 Eliz. 2. c. 53	Town and Country Planning Act 1959	Section 33.
7 & 8 Eliz. 2. c. 70	Town and Country Planning (Scotland) Act 1959	Section 33.
10 & 11 Eliz. 2. c. 30	Northern Ireland Act 1962	In Part I of Schedule 1 the entry relating to the Tribunals and Inquiries Act 1958.
10 & 11 Eliz. 2. c. 46	Transport Act 1962	Section 88.
1964 c. 14	Plant Varieties and Seeds Act 1964	Section 12.
1966 c. 6	National Insurance Act 1966	Section 13(3).
1966 c. 20	Ministry of Social Security Act 1966	In Schedule 6 paragraph 16.
1966 c. 43	Tribunals and Inquiries Act 1966	The whole act.
1967 c. 13	Parliamentary Commissioner Act 1967	Section 1(5).
1967 c. 17	Iron and Steel Act 1967	Section 32(3).
1968 c. 23	Rent Act 1968	In Schedule 15 the entry relating to the Tribunals and Inquiries Act 1958.
1968 c. 49	Social Work (Scotland) Act 1968	Section 89.
1968 c. 73	Transport Act 1968	In Part I of Schedule 10 the entry relating to the Tribunals and Inquiries Act 1958.
1971 c. 28	Rent (Scotland) Act 1971	In Part II of Schedule 18 the entry relating to the Tribunals and Inquiries Act 1958.

Part II – Orders revoked by section 18(2)
Citation	Title	Extent of revocation
SI 1959/1267	Tribunals and Inquiries (National Insurance Adjudicator) Order 1959	The whole order.
SI 1960/810	Tribunals and Inquiries (Mental Health Review Tribunals) Order 1960	The whole order.
SI 1960/1335	Tribunals and Inquiries (Air Transport Licensing Board) Order 1960	The whole order.
SI 1960/1668	Tribunals and Inquiries (Finance Act Tribunal) Order 1960	The whole order.
SI 1962/1697	Tribunals and Inquiries (Betting Levy Appeal Tribunals) Order 1962	The whole order.
SI 1964/445	Tribunals and Inquiries (Compensation Appeal Tribunals) Order 1964	The whole order.
SI 1964/1726	Tribunals and Inquiries (Indemnification of Justices and Clerks) Order 1964	The whole order.
SI 1965/276	Tribunals and Inquiries (Miscellaneous Tribunals) Order 1965	The whole order.
SI 1965/1403	Tribunals and Inquiries (Industrial Tribunals) Order 1965	The whole order.
SI 1965/2151	Tribunals and Inquiries (Rent Assessment Committees) Order 1965	The whole order.
SI 1965/2190	Tribunals and Inquiries (Local Valuation Courts and Valuation Appeal Committees) Order 1965	The whole order.
SI 1970/1219	Tribunals and Inquiries (Immigration Appeals) Order 1970	The whole order.
SI 1970/1458	Tribunals and Inquiries (Lands Tribunal for Scotland) Order 1970	The whole order.
SI 1970/1774	Tribunals and Inquiries (Commons Commissioners) Order 1970	The whole order.
SI 1971/831	Tribunals and Inquiries (Firemen's Pension Scheme Appeal Tribunals and Air Operators' Certificates) Order 1971	The whole order.

== Subsequent developments ==
The whole act was repealed by section 18(2) of, and part I of schedule 4 to, the Tribunals and Inquiries Act 1992, which came into force on 1 October 1992.
