= United Kingdom prison population =

Prison population of the United Kingdom

The United Kingdom has three distinct legal systems with a separate prison system in each: one for both England and Wales, one for Scotland, and one for Northern Ireland. As of June 2023, the United Kingdom has the highest per-capita incarceration rate in Western Europe, at 159 people per 100,000 in England and Wales; 162 people per 100,000 in Scotland; 97 people per 100,000 in Northern Ireland; and the largest prison population in Western Europe. The average cost per prison place (including all resource expenditure) was £46,696 in England and Wales (2021/22), £46,892 in Scotland (2021/22), and £47,927 in Northern Ireland (2022/23). This figure has risen to close to £57,000 for England and Wales in 2023/24.

As of June 2023, the total UK prison population was 95,526: composed of 85,851 prisoners from England and Wales, 7,775 from Scotland and 1,900 from Northern Ireland. At the end of the first quarter of 2024, there were 87,869 prisoners in England and Wales. In 2019, the recidivism rate in the UK was close to 50% after one year.

== Demographics ==
=== People from ethnic minority backgrounds ===
People of minority ethnicities (BAME) constitute 13% of the general population, but make up 27% of the prison population. In 2017, a review led by David Lammy MP concluded that the justice system was biased against this group, and required reform. In 2019, Lammy expressed deep concern at the high proportion of BAME males in young offender institutions with 51% of boys in young offender institutions identifying as BAME, saying that "England and Wales are now hitting an American scale of disproportionality in our youth justice system". The over-representation of the black population in prisons may be a result of stop and search, custodial remands and the make-up of the prison population itself with 32% of all children in prison being black.

Prison Population by Ethnic Group as of 31 March 2024
Position	Ethnic group	Prison population	Per cent of incarcerated population	Per cent of population (2021 Census)^{‡}
1	White or White British	63,103	71.8%	81.7%
2	Black or Black British	10,624	12.1%	4.0%
3	Asian or Asian British	7,067	8.0%	9.3%
4	Mixed	4,188	4.8%	2.9%
5	Other ethnic group	1,794	2.0%	2.1%
Unrecorded / Non stated		1,093	1.2%	—
Total (2024)		87,869	100%	100%

Notes:
^{‡} 2021 Census, England and Wales only

=== Religious group ===
In the two decades since 2002, the proportion of Christian prisoners has fallen by 14%, to 44% of the incarcerated population. Meanwhile the proportion of Muslim prisoners has risen, by 10%, to 18%. Other religious groups did not see a significant change in proportion. Beginning in 2008, concerns over the spread of Sharia in British prisons, including the operation of unofficial prisoner-run Sharia courts and the forced conversions of non-Muslims, have been reported. According to the UK prison officers' union in 2013, some Muslim prisoners in the UK had allegedly forcibly converted fellow inmates to Islam in prisons. There have been multiple cases of non-Muslim prisoners threatened with violence with "convert or get hurt" being a commonly used phrase by Muslim gangs according to an independent report published by the government. In category A and B prisons, former inmates have publicly spoken out on the rise of Islamism with the "balance of power" in reputational violence now shifted towards Muslim gangs. Prisoners who refuse to convert or who stand up to Islamic gangs are at risk of being attacked and face death threats. Some prisons have been unable to cope with the rise of Islamic gangs, and have opted to place threatened inmates into isolation units for their own safety. Other reasons why inmates may convert include wanting protection in wings where Muslim gangs are prevalent, the ability to go to chapel, and access to different foods. Around 1 in 5 Muslim prisoners in the UK are now white.

The Fishmonger's Hall, Streatham, and Reading attacks brought increased attention on the risk of Islamist gangs and convicted terrorists radicalising other inmates in prisons. Concerns were first raised in 2010 by the Royal United Services Institute over the growing radicalisation of Muslims in prisons. According to Jonathan Hall KC, the Independent Reviewer of Terrorism Legislation, convicted terrorists "enjoy high status" in prisons and other inmates are attracted to their extremist interpretation of Islam. The 2023 CONTEST report found that Islamic terrorists represented 64% of those in custody for terrorism-connected offences with 44% of declared terrorist attacks in the UK since 2018 perpetrated by serving or recently released Muslim prisoners. Attempts to engage imprisoned terrorists with de-radicalisation programmes have been largely unsuccessful.

Prison Population by Religious Group as of 31 March 2024
Position	Religious group	Prison population	Per cent of incarcerated population	Per cent of population (2021 Census)^{‡}
1	Christianity	39,068	44.5%	46.2%
2	No religion	27,122	30.9%	37.2%
3	Islam	15,909	18.1%	6.5%
4	Other religious group	2,335	2.7%	0.6%
5	Buddhism	1,656	1.9%	0.5%
6	Sikhism	578	0.7%	0.9%
7	Judaism	511	0.6%	0.5%
8	Hinduism	348	0.4%	1.7%
Not recorded		335	0.4%	6.0%
Non recognised		7	0.0%	—
Total (2024)		87,869	100%	100%

Notes:
^{‡} 2021 Census, England and Wales only

=== Immigrants and foreign nationals ===
76,869 British nationals were recorded in the prison population at the end of the first quarter of 2024. The remainder of the population was made up of 10,422 foreign nationals, making up 11.9% of the total population, with an additional 578 having no nationality recorded.

Foreign Nationals in the Prison Population as of 31 March 2024
Position	Nationality status	Prison population	Per cent of Total	Foreign nationals (2021 Census)^{‡}	Incarceration rate per 1,000 foreign nationals
1	Albania	1,273	12.2%	21,000*	60.62
2	Poland	906	8.7%	760,146	1.19
3	Romania	750	7.2%	550,298	1.36
4	(Republic of Ireland) Ireland	649	6.2%	364,726	1.78
5	Jamaica	381	3.7%	28,634	13.31
6	Lithuania	361	3.5%	185,159	1.95
7	Pakistan	313	3.0%	166,425	1.88
8	Portugal	290	2.8%	286,489	1.01
9	India	271	2.6%	369,224	0.73
10	Iraq	259	2.5%	10,237	25.30
11	Somalia	250	2.4%	109,567	2.28
12	Iran	248	2.4%	16,462	15.06
13	Nigeria	233	2.2%	117,638	1.98
14	Afghanistan	172	1.7%	14,272	12.05
15	Vietnam	167	1.6%	Data Unavailable	—N/a
All other nationalities		3,899	37.4%	—N/a	—N/a
Total (2024)		10,422	100%	—N/a	—N/a

Notes:
^{‡} 2021 Census, England and Wales only
^{*} 2021 ONS Estimate

In 2024, The Telegraph conducted analysis of Ministry of Justice data on foreign nationals alongside recent census data and found that 1 in 50 Albanians in the UK were in jail. Albanians had the highest imprisonment rate, followed by Kosovans, Vietnamese, Algerians, Jamaicans, Eritreans, Iraqis and Somalis. Conversely German, Italian, Indian, Greek, US, Sri Lankan, French and Chinese nationals were the least likely nationalities to be in prison. Overall, the imprisonment rate of foreign nationals was 27 per cent higher than for British citizens.

=== Age group ===
Age Groups in the Prison Population as of 31 March 2024
Age group	Prison population	Per cent of Total	Per cent of population (2021 Census)^{‡}
15–17	264	0.3%	3.4%
18–20	3,090	3.5%	8.3%
21–24	8,155	9.3%	8.3%
25–29	13,226	15.1%	6.5%
30–39	29,339	33.4%	13.7%
40–49	18,175	20.7%	12.7%
50–59	9,391	10.7%	13.7%
60–69	4,250	4.8%	10.7%
70 and over	1,979	2.3%	13.5%
Total (2024)	87,869	100%	82.5%

Notes:
^{‡} 2021 Census, England and Wales only

Children and young people aged under 18 are not sent to adult prisons if they are sentenced to custody. They either go to young offender institutions (for prisoners aged 15–21), secure training centres (for those aged under 17) or secure children's homes (for those aged under 15).

The number of children in custody has declined since mid-2008, from more than 3,000 to about 900 at any one time. In 2019 an independent inquiry into child sexual abuse published a report that described the scale of alleged abuse in young offender institutions and secure training centres as "shockingly high".

The number of British prisoners over 60 years of age rose by 130% between 2002 and 2013, a shift attributed to an increase in the convictions for historic sex abuse. The increase was reported after the 2012 commencement of Operation Yewtree, a police investigation into sexual abuse allegations—predominantly the abuse of children—against the British media personality Jimmy Savile and others. In relation to over 4,000 over-60 prisoners in UK prisons, Professor David Wilson of Birmingham City University stated in July 2014:

Four out of 10 of these prisoners (the over-60s) were convicted of sex offences and people over 60 are the fastest growing age group in the prison estate, yet there is no national strategy for the elderly who get sent to prison ... The Prison Service needs to develop a strategy to cope with this fastest growing section of the prison population or they will simply be failing in their duty of care to the elderly people that they are locking up.

In 2018 there were more than 1,500 prisoners over 70, including more than 200 aged over 80, creating increasing demands on health and social care systems.

=== Gender ===
3,635 women were recorded in the prison population (4.1%) at the end of the first quarter of 2024. As of 2018, most were serving time for non-violent offences. There is evidence that women may be a particularly vulnerable prison population: they account for 20% of self-injury behind bars, and are twice as likely to report mental health issues as male prisoners. In 2018 the government launched a new Female Offender Strategy to try and address the needs of this particular population.

Women with a child aged under 18 months old may apply to bring their child into prison with them, if they are serving a short sentence. Women who give birth in prison may keep their baby for the first 18 months in a mother and baby unit.

== Prison population ==
=== Veterans ===
A growing number of British prisoners are former armed forces members. According to a study reported in the Guardian in 2009, 8500 former servicemen were imprisoned, making up almost 10% of the prison population.

=== Scotland ===
Scotland recognized the growth in the prison population and acted accordingly to make adjustments to how the law was carried out so that the system operates efficiently. One of the actions made was to decrease the number of stop-and-searches and between the period of June 2015 and August 2016, there was reportedly an 81% decrease in those actions when statistics from 2014 were compared.

=== Drug abusers ===
The proportion of prisoners developing a drug abuse problem while incarcerated rose from 8.4% in 2013-2014 to nearly 15% in 2018–2019. Much of the prison system is badly equipped to disrupt illegal drug supply and security standards vary between prisons.

== See also ==
- List of countries by incarceration rate
