= Children and Young Persons (Scotland) Act 1937 =

Act of the Parliament of the United Kingdom

Children and Young Persons (Scotland) Act 1937 (Note: Section 113(1).)
- Act of Parliament
- Parliament of the United Kingdom
- Long title: An Act to consolidate in their application to Scotland certain enactments relating to persons under the age of eighteen years.
- Citation: 1 Edw. 8 & 1 Geo. 6. c. 37
- Territorial extent: Scotland; Isle of Man; (Note: Section 113(3).)

Dates
- Royal assent: 1 July 1937
- Commencement: 1 July 1937 (Note: Section 113(2).)
- Repealed: Isle of Man: 22 July 2004

Other legislation
- Amends: See § Repealed enactments
- Repeals/revokes: See § Repealed enactments
- Amended by: Criminal Procedure (Scotland) Act 1938; Reorganisation of Offices (Scotland) Act 1939; Education (Scotland) Act 1945; Local Government (Scotland) Act 1947; Children Act 1948; National Assistance Act 1948; Criminal Justice (Scotland) Act 1949; Statute Law Revision Act 1950; Adoption Act 1950; Valuation and Rating (Scotland) Act 1956; Children Act 1958; Local Government and Miscellaneous Financial Provisions (Scotland) Act 1958; Licensing (Scotland) Act 1959; Education (Scotland) Act 1962; Children and Young Persons Act 1963; Murder (Abolition of Death Penalty) Act 1965; Police (Scotland) Act 1967; Social Work (Scotland) Act 1968; Children and Young Persons Act 1969; Children Act 1972; Local Government (Scotland) Act 1973; Employment of Children Act 1973; Consumer Credit Act 1974; Children Act 1975; Statute Law (Repeals) Act 1975; Criminal Procedure (Scotland) Act 1975; Sexual Offences (Scotland) Act 1976; Civic Government (Scotland) Act 1982; Cable and Broadcasting Act 1984; Cinemas Act 1985; Criminal Justice Act 1988; Self-Governing Schools etc. (Scotland) Act 1989; Employment Act 1989; Prisons (Scotland) Act 1989; Broadcasting Act 1990; Children (Scotland) Act 1995; Criminal Procedure (Consequential Provisions) (Scotland) Act 1995; Children (Protection at Work) Regulations 1998; Children (Protection at Work) (Scotland) Regulations 2000; Criminal Justice (Scotland) Act 2003; Statute Law (Repeals) Act 2004; Licensing (Scotland) Act 2005; Children (Protection at Work) (Scotland) Regulations 2006; Human Fertilisation and Embryology Act 2008; Public Health etc. (Scotland) Act 2008; Licensing (Scotland) Act 2005 (Consequential Provisions) Order 2009; Tobacco and Primary Medical Services (Scotland) Act 2010; Police and Fire Reform (Scotland) Act 2012; Criminal Justice (Scotland) Act 2016 (Consequential and Supplementary Modifications) Regulations 2017; Children (Care and Justice) (Scotland) Act 2024
- Repealed by: Isle of Man: Statute Law (Repeals) Act 2004
- Relates to: Children and Young Persons Act 1933

Status: Partially repealed

Text of statute as originally enacted

Revised text of statute as amended

Text of the Children and Young Persons (Scotland) Act 1937 as in force today (including any amendments) within the United Kingdom, from legislation.gov.uk.

The Children and Young Persons (Scotland) Act 1937 (1 Edw. 8 & 1 Geo. 6. c. 37) is an act of the Parliament of the United Kingdom that consolidated enactments related to persons under the age of eighteen years in Scotland.

The act paralled the Children and Young Persons Act 1933 (23 & 24 Geo. 5. c. 12), which applied to England and Wales.

== Provisions ==
=== Repealed enactments ===
Section 113(4) of the act repealed 4 enactments, listed in the fourth schedule to the act.

Citation	Short title	Extent of repeal
8 Edw. 7. c. 67	Children Act 1908	The whole act so far as unrepealed, except section one hundred and twenty-two, section one hundred and thirty-two (so far as necessary for the application to Scotland of the first mentioned section), and subsection (1) of section one hundred and thirty-four.
10 Edw. 7. & 1 Geo. 5. c. 25	Children Act (1908) Amendment Act 1910	The whole act.
22 & 23 Geo. 5. c. 47	Children and Young Persons (Scotland) Act 1932	The whole act except sections nine and seventy-three, subsection (1) of section eighty-three from the beginning to the words "Act, 1932," and subsection (3) of section eighty-three.
26 Geo. 5. & 1 Edw. 8. c. 42	Education (Scotland) Act 1936	Section five.

== Subsequent developments ==
Large parts of the act have been repealed since its enactment. Part I (Child Life Protection, sections 1–11) and most of Parts IV (Criminal Proceedings, sections 39–80), V (Remand Homes and Approved Schools, sections 81–95) and VI (Voluntary Homes, sections 96–99) have been repealed by successive legislation. Significant amending legislation includes the Children Act 1958 (6 & 7 Eliz. 2. c. 65), the Children and Young Persons Act 1963, the Children Act 1975, and the Criminal Justice Act 1988.

The Children (Scotland) Act 1995 amended language in section 12 regarding parental responsibilities, with effect from 1 November 1996.

The Criminal Justice (Scotland) Act 2003 further amended section 12 with effect from 27 October 2003.

The whole act was repealed for the Isle of Man by section 1(1) of, and group 11 of part 17 of schedule 1 to, the Statute Law (Repeals) Act 2004, which came into force on 22 July 2004.
