= Police child protection powers in England and Wales =

In England and Wales, Police child protection powers concern the powers of the individual local police forces to intervene to safeguard children. These powers are governed by Section 46 of the Children Act 1989. Under this law, the police have the power to remove children to a safe location for up to 72 hours to protect them from "significant harm". Police do not require a court order to take such a step.

== Background ==
Police powers to protect children were first brought into law in the Prevention of Cruelty to, and Protection of, Children Act 1989. This Act allowed the police to "take into custody without warrant" anyone who causes harm to children and take the child involved to a place of safety until the case is brought to court.

== Provisions ==
In the UK, police are considered to be on the "front line" when dealing with social problems such as domestic violence. Section 46 of the Children Act 1989 gives them the power to remove children or prevent them from being exposed to dangerous environments. The police are required to make a professional judgement to decide if a child is at risk of "significant harm" if they do not use their powers of protection. Social workers do not have similar powers to protect children without obtaining a court order first.

As a professional worker, a social worker can request that a police constable exercise their power in situations where a child is at immediate risk of harm or abuse; a social worker will then often follow the procedure for an emergency protection order via the judicial system.

Section 46 does not give police the right to force an entry to remove a child, and therefore a warrant has to be obtained, but the Police and Criminal Evidence Act 1984 allows police to enter a property to save life or limb. A child can be kept in police protection for a period of up to 72 hours and should be accommodated appropriately during that time; safe places to accommodate a child can include a hospital or local authority care.

Guidance published by the Department of Health in 2003 stated that a police station is not suitable accommodation, but if there is no alternative available children should be made comfortable and given access to food, drink and toilet facilities. If police decide to place a child with relative or other carer they must undertake basic checks: Police National Computer, sex offender registry and child protection register in regard to the proposed carers.

While under police protection, children must be allowed contact with their parents if it is appropriate and in their best interests. If a child is placed in local authority care, the responsibility for organising contact falls to the local authority rather than the police. The police protection provisions do not allow the local authority or police to gain parental responsibility, which remains with the parents or guardians.

During the 72 hours, the police officer responsible for executing their powers should inform the "designated officer". A designated officer should be allocated to each police force to deal with these emergency child safeguarding cases and to liaise with local authorities. The police should also inform the child's parents of the situation and help the child to understand what is happening and ascertain their wishes and views.

Whilst a child is subject to police protection, the designated officer has a duty to review the case regularly for the full period the child is under police protection; even if the child has been accommodated elsewhere. If the designated police officer changes during this period, this must be endorsed on the police protection form.

When the local authority is informed they must initiate a Section 47 inquiry and may also then wish to apply to the court for an Emergency Protection Order to protect the child from harm. This order may be applied for by the local authority or by the police.

== Assessment and impact ==
The police protection provisions under Section 46 of the Children Act 1989 are sometimes called Police Protection Orders (PPOs). This is incorrect as the powers are carried out without approval by a court and therefore the police do not require a court order to proceed.

A 1998 study of 13 police authorities found that the most common reason for police protection provisions being used was for children "at risk". The other reasons given, in order of number of occurrences were "missing from home", "behaviour", "home alone", "on street", "abduction", "domestic violence", "parents arrest and disputes". They also found that some police authorities placed children with relatives, family friends or other appropriate adults more readily than others.

Masson et al.'s research discovered that three quarters of children removed under police protection provisions were taken to police stations; and when there the police are limited for safe places for them to stay. It also illustrated that 60% of cases resulted in the child being put into local authority care and found that designated officers were usually uniformed officers and in some cases the designated officers only worked 9–5 hours.

Some local authorities choose to seek assistance from the police when courts are unwilling to hear an application for an Emergency Protection order at short notice. Some police officers feel that they do not have adequate training or skills to make a judgement regarding exercise of their child-protection powers. A larger concern of the police is regarding the consequences of not acting; therefore, covering their backs.
