= Foster Children Act 1980 =

Act of the Parliament of the United Kingdom

Foster Children Act 1980 (Note: Section 24(1).)
- Act of Parliament
- Parliament of the United Kingdom
- Long title: An Act to consolidate certain enactments relating to foster children as they have effect in England and Wales.
- Citation: 1980 c. 6
- Territorial extent: England and Wales (Note: Section 24(3).)

Dates
- Royal assent: 31 January 1980
- Commencement: 1 April 1981 (Note: Section 24(2). The Child Care Act 1980 (Commencement) Order 1980 (SI 1980/1935).)
- Repealed: 14 October 1991 (Note: The Children Act 1989 (Commencement and Transitional Provisions) Order 1991 (SI 1991/828).)

Other legislation
- Amends: See § Repealed enactments
- Repeals/revokes: See § Repealed enactments
- Amended by: Foster Children (Scotland) Act 1984
- Repealed by: Children Act 1989
- Relates to: Child Care Act 1980; Foster Children (Scotland) Act 1984

Status: Repealed

Text of statute as originally enacted

Revised text of statute as amended

The Foster Children Act 1980 (c. 6) was an act of the Parliament of the United Kingdom that consolidated enactments relating to foster children in England and Wales.

The Foster Children (Scotland) Act 1984 made equivalent provisions for Scotland.

== Provisions ==
=== Repealed enactments ===
Section 23(3) of the act repealed 10 enactments, listed in schedule 3 to the act.

Enactments repealed by section 23(3)
Citation	Short title	Extent of repeal
6 & 7 Eliz. 2. c. 65	Children Act 1958	The whole act, so far as unrepealed, except the entry in Schedule 2 relating to section 38 of the Children Act 1948.
7 & 8 Eliz. 2. c. 72	Mental Health Act 1959	In Schedule 7, in Part II, the entry relating to the Children Act 1958.
8 & 9 Eliz. 2. c. 61	Mental Health (Scotland) Act 1960	In Schedule 4, the entry relating to the Children Act 1958.
1968 c. 49	Social Work (Scotland) Act 1968	In Schedule 8, paragraphs 44 to 47.
1969 c. 54	Children and Young Persons Act 1969	Section 51.
1969 c. 54	Children and Young Persons Act 1969	In section 52, subsections (1) to (3) and (5).
1969 c. 54	Children and Young Persons Act 1969	Sections 53 to 57.
1969 c. 54	Children and Young Persons Act 1969	Section 72(5).
1969 c. 54	Children and Young Persons Act 1969	In Schedule 4, paragraphs 10 and 16.
1969 c. 54	Children and Young Persons Act 1969	In Schedule 5, paragraphs 29 to 32 and paragraph 82.
1969 c. 54	Children and Young Persons Act 1969	Schedule 7.
1970 c. 42	Local Authority Social Services Act 1970	In Schedule 1, the entry relating to the Children Act 1958.
1971 c. 23	Courts Act 1971	In Schedule 9, in Part I, the entry relating to the Children Act 1958.
1972 c. 70	Local Government Act 1972	In Schedule 23, paragraph 7.
1975 c. 72	Children Act 1975	Sections 95 to 97.
1975 c. 72	Children Act 1975	In Schedule 3, paragraphs 16(a) and 18 to 20.
1976 c. 36	Adoption Act 1976	In Schedule 3, paragraphs 5 and 6.

== Subsequent developments ==
The whole act was repealed by section 108(7) of, and schedule 15 to, the Children Act 1989, which came into force on 14 October 1991.
