= List of acts of the Parliament of the United Kingdom from 1958 =

This is a complete list of acts of the Parliament of the United Kingdom for the year 1958.

Note that the first parliament of the United Kingdom was held in 1801; parliaments between 1707 and 1800 were either parliaments of Great Britain or of Ireland. For acts passed up until 1707, see the list of acts of the Parliament of England and the list of acts of the Parliament of Scotland. For acts passed from 1707 to 1800, see the list of acts of the Parliament of Great Britain. See also the list of acts of the Parliament of Ireland.

For acts of the devolved parliaments and assemblies in the United Kingdom, see the list of acts of the Scottish Parliament, the list of acts of the Northern Ireland Assembly, and the list of acts and measures of Senedd Cymru; see also the list of acts of the Parliament of Northern Ireland.

The number shown after each act's title is its chapter number. Acts passed before 1963 are cited using this number, preceded by the year(s) of the reign during which the relevant parliamentary session was held; thus the Union with Ireland Act 1800 is cited as "39 & 40 Geo. 3 c. 67", meaning the 67th act passed during the session that started in the 39th year of the reign of George III and which finished in the 40th year of that reign. Note that the modern convention is to use Arabic numerals in citations (thus "41 Geo. 3" rather than "41 Geo. III"). Acts of the last session of the Parliament of Great Britain and the first session of the Parliament of the United Kingdom are both cited as "41 Geo. 3". Acts passed from 1963 onwards are simply cited by calendar year and chapter number.

== 6 & 7 Eliz. 2 ==
Continuing the third session of the 41st Parliament of the United Kingdom, which met from 5 November 1957 until 23 October 1958.

=== Public general acts ===
Short title	Citation	Royal assent
Long title
Post Office and Telegraph (Money) Act 1958 (repealed)	6 & 7 Eliz. 2. c. 5	20 February 1958
An Act to provide money for expenses of the Post Office properly chargeable to capital account; and for purposes connected therewith. (Repealed by Post Office Act 1961 (9 & 10 Eliz. 2. c. 15))
Import Duties Act 1958 (repealed)	6 & 7 Eliz. 2. c. 6	20 February 1958
An Act to confer new powers to impose duties of customs in place of the powers conferred by the Import Duties Act, 1932, (Note: Import Duties Act 1932 (22 & 23 Geo. 5. c. 8)) and in connection therewith, to repeal the duties of customs chargeable under or by virtue of that Act and of certain other enactments and make general provision for the purpose of customs duties as to Commonwealth preference and as to produce of the sea, and for purposes connected with the matters aforesaid. (Repealed by European Communities Act 1972 (c. 68), Import Duties (Outward Processing Relief) Regulations 1976 (SI 1976/838), Finance Act 1977 (c. 36), Inward Processing Relief Regulations 1977 (SI 1977/910), Customs Duties Relief Regulations 1978 (SI 1978/1704) and Customs and Excise Duties (General Reliefs) Act 1979 (c. 3))
Consolidated Fund Act 1958 (repealed)	6 & 7 Eliz. 2. c. 7	20 February 1958
An Act to apply a sum out of the Consolidated Fund to the service of the year ending on the thirty-first day of March, one thousand nine hundred and fifty-eight. (Repealed by Statute Law Revision Act 1964 (c. 79))
Trustee Savings Bank Act 1958 (repealed)	6 & 7 Eliz. 2. c. 8	20 February 1958
An Act to amend the law relating to trustee savings banks. (Repealed by Trustee Savings Banks Act 1969 (c. 50))
Entertainments Duty Act 1958 (repealed)	6 & 7 Eliz. 2. c. 9	20 February 1958
An Act to consolidate the enactments relating to entertainments duty. (Repealed by Finance Act 1960 (8 & 9 Eliz. 2. c. 44))
British Nationality Act 1958 (repealed)	6 & 7 Eliz. 2. c. 10	20 February 1958
An Act to amend the British Nationality Act, 1948, (Note: British Nationality Act 1948 (11 & 12 Geo. 6. c. 56)) by making provision in relation to the Federation of Rhodesia and Nyasaland and to Ghana, by extending the provisions for registering persons as citizens of the United Kingdom and Colonies, by extending and providing for the discharge of the functions in Commonwealth countries of High Commissioners for Her Majesty's Government in the United Kingdom, and for purposes connected therewith. (Repealed by British Nationality Act 1981 (c. 61))
Isle of Man Act 1958 (repealed)	6 & 7 Eliz. 2. c. 11	20 February 1958
An Act to repeal certain enactments relating to the Isle of Man; to empower the Court of Tynwald to make provision with regard to customs and harbours; to provide for the payment to the Isle of Man of a share of certain duties; and for purposes connected therewith. (Repealed by Finance Act 1972 (c. 41), Statute Law (Repeals) Act 1974 (c. 22), Statute Law (Repeals) Act 1977 (c. 18), Statute Law (Repeals) Act 1978 (c. 45) and Isle of Man Act 1979 (c. 58))
New Towns Act 1958 (repealed)	6 & 7 Eliz. 2. c. 12	20 February 1958
An Act to increase the aggregate amount of the advances which may be made to development corporations under subsection (1) of section twelve of the New Towns Act, 1946; (Note: New Towns Act 1946 (9 & 10 Geo. 6. c. 68)) and to amend section thirteen of that Act in respect of the reports and accounts to be laid before Parliament. (Repealed for England and Wales by New Towns Act 1965 (c. 59) and for Scotland by New Towns (Scotland) Act 1968 (c. 16))
Cayman Islands and Turks and Caicos Islands Act 1958 (repealed)	6 & 7 Eliz. 2. c. 13	20 February 1958
An Act to separate the Turks and Caicos Islands from the colony of Jamaica and to make fresh provision for the government of those Islands and the Cayman Islands. (Repealed by West Indies Act 1962 (10 & 11 Eliz. 2. c. 19))
Overseas Service Act 1958 (repealed)	6 & 7 Eliz. 2. c. 14	13 March 1958
An Act to authorise the Secretary of State to appoint officers available for civilian employment in public services overseas; to make provision as to superannuation in respect of officers so appointed, and to make further provision with respect to the overseas service of police officers; and for purposes connected with the matters aforesaid. (Repealed by Overseas Development and Co-operation Act 1980 (c. 63))
Overseas Resources Development Act 1958 (repealed)	6 & 7 Eliz. 2. c. 15	13 March 1958
An Act to make provision as to the areas in which the Colonial Development Corporation may operate, and to increase the sums which may be borrowed by the Corporation or advanced to them by the Secretary of State. (Repealed by Overseas Resources Development Act 1959 (7 & 8 Eliz. 2. c. 23))
Commonwealth Institute Act 1958 (repealed)	6 & 7 Eliz. 2. c. 16	13 March 1958
An Act to amend the law with respect to the Imperial Institute. (Repealed by Commonwealth Act 2002 (c. 39))
Recreational Charities Act 1958 (repealed)	6 & 7 Eliz. 2. c. 17	13 March 1958
An Act to declare charitable under the law of England and Wales the provision in the interests of social welfare of facilities for recreation or other leisure-time occupation, to make similar provision as to certain trusts heretofore established for carrying out social welfare activities within the meaning of the Miners' Welfare Act, 1952, (Note: Miners' Welfare Act 1952 (15 & 16 Geo. 6. & 1 Eliz. 2. c. 23)) to enable laws for corresponding purposes to be passed by the Parliament of Northern Ireland, and for purposes connected therewith. (Repealed by Charities Act 2011 (c. 25))
Consolidated Fund (No. 2) Act 1958 (repealed)	6 & 7 Eliz. 2. c. 18	26 March 1958
An Act to apply certain sums out of the Consolidated Fund to the service of the years ending on the thirty-first day of March one thousand nine hundred and fifty-seven one thousand nine hundred and fifty-eight and one thousand nine hundred and fifty-nine. (Repealed by Statute Law Revision Act 1964 (c. 79))
Nationalised Industries Loans Act 1958 (repealed)	6 & 7 Eliz. 2. c. 19	26 March 1958
An Act to continue until the end of August, nineteen hundred and fifty-eight, the power to make advances under section forty-two of the Finance Act, 1956. (Note: Finance Act 1956 (4 & 5 Eliz. 2. c. 54)) (Repealed by Finance Act 1958 (6 & 7 Eliz. 2. c. 56))
National Health Service Contributions Act 1958 (repealed)	6 & 7 Eliz. 2. c. 20	30 April 1958
An Act to increase the rates of national health service contributions, and for purposes connected therewith. (Repealed by National Health Service Contributions Act 1961 (9 & 10 Eliz. 2. c. 13))
Life Peerages Act 1958	6 & 7 Eliz. 2. c. 21	30 April 1958
An Act to make provision for the creation of life peerages carrying the right to sit and vote in the House of Lords.
Road Transport Lighting (Amendment) Act 1958 (repealed)	6 & 7 Eliz. 2. c. 22	30 April 1958
An Act to amend sections two and three of the Road Transport Lighting Act, 1957, (Note: Road Transport Lighting Act 1957 (5 & 6 Eliz. 2. c. 51)) so as to permit the use of amber coloured reflectors on the pedals of bicycles and tricycles. (Repealed by Road Traffic Act 1972 (c. 20))
Milford Haven Conservancy Act 1958 (repealed)	6 & 7 Eliz. 2. c. 23	30 April 1958
An Act to make provision with respect to the maintenance, improvement, protection and regulation of the navigation of Milford Haven; and for purposes connected therewith. (Repealed by Milford Haven Conservancy Act 1983 (c. xxix))
Land Drainage (Scotland) Act 1958	6 & 7 Eliz. 2. c. 24	14 May 1958
An Act to make provision with respect to the drainage of agricultural land in Scotland and for purposes connected therewith.
Christmas Island Act 1958 (repealed)	6 & 7 Eliz. 2. c. 25	14 May 1958
An Act to enable Her Majesty to place Christmas Island under the Authority of the Commonwealth of Australia, and for purposes connected therewith. (Repealed by Statute Law (Repeals) Act 1976 (c. 16))
House of Commons (Redistribution of Seats) Act 1958 (repealed)	6 & 7 Eliz. 2. c. 26	14 May 1958
An Act to amend the House of Commons (Redistribution of Seats) Act, 1949. (Note: House of Commons (Redistribution of Seats) Act 1949 (12, 13 & 14 Geo. 6. c. 66)) (Repealed by Parliamentary Constituencies Act 1986 (c. 56))
Industrial Assurance and Friendly Societies Act 1948 (Amendment) Act 1958 (repealed)	6 & 7 Eliz. 2. c. 27	7 July 1958
An Act to amend the Industrial Assurance and Friendly Societies Act, 1948, (Note: Industrial Assurance and Friendly Societies Act 1948 (11 & 12 Geo. 6. c. 39)) by increasing the limit on the amount of insurances on the life of a parent or grandparent. (Repealed by Friendly Societies Act 1992 (c. 40))
Solicitors (Scotland) Act 1958 (repealed)	6 & 7 Eliz. 2. c. 28	7 July 1958
An Act to amend the law relating to solicitors and notaries public in Scotland, and for purposes connected therewith. (Repealed by Solicitors (Scotland) Act 1980 (c. 46))
Marriage Acts Amendment Act 1958	6 & 7 Eliz. 2. c. 29	7 July 1958
An Act to enable certain places of worship to be registered for marriages less than twelve months after first being used for worship; and for purposes connected with the matter aforesaid.
Land Powers (Defence) Act 1958	6 & 7 Eliz. 2. c. 30	7 July 1958
An Act to provide for the termination of certain emergency powers and to make certain provision in substitution therefor; and for purposes connected with the matters aforesaid.
First Offenders Act 1958 (repealed)	6 & 7 Eliz. 2. c. 31	7 July 1958
An Act to restrict the imprisonment of first offenders. (Repealed by Criminal Justice Act 1972 (c. 71))
Opticians Act 1958 (repealed)	6 & 7 Eliz. 2. c. 32	7 July 1958
An Act to provide for the registration of opticians and the enrolment of bodies corporate carrying on business as opticians; to regulate the practice of opticians and the conduct by such bodies corporate of their business as opticians; to impose restrictions on the testing of sight and the supply of optical appliances; and for purposes connected therewith. (Repealed by Opticians Act 1989 (c. 44))
Disabled Persons (Employment) Act 1958	6 & 7 Eliz. 2. c. 33	7 July 1958
An Act to amend the law relating to disabled persons as regards the minimum age for attendance at certain courses under the Disabled Persons (Employment) Act, 1944, (Note: Disabled Persons (Employment) Act 1944 (7 & 8 Geo. 6. c. 10)) as regards registration under that Act and as regards the provision by local authorities of employment or other work under special conditions.
Litter Act 1958 (repealed)	6 & 7 Eliz. 2. c. 34	7 July 1958
An Act to make provision for the abatement of litter. (Repealed by Litter Act 1983 (c. 35))
Matrimonial Causes (Property and Maintenance) Act 1958	6 & 7 Eliz. 2. c. 35	7 July 1958
An Act to enable the power of the court in matrimonial proceedings to order alimony, maintenance or the securing of a sum of money to be exercised at any time after a decree; to provide for the setting aside of dispositions of property made for the purpose of reducing the assets available for satisfying such an order; to enable the court after the death of a party to a marriage which has been dissolved or annulled to make provision out of his estate in favour of the other party; and to extend the powers of the court under section seventeen of the Married Women's Property Act, 1882. (Note: Married Women's Property Act 1882 (45 & 46 Vict. c. 75))
Physical Training and Recreation Act 1958 (repealed)	6 & 7 Eliz. 2. c. 36	7 July 1958
An Act to make provision for loans to be made by local authorities for physical training and recreation in Great Britain. (Repealed for England and Wales by Local Government (Miscellaneous Provisions) Act 1976 (c. 57) and for Scotland by Local Government and Planning (Scotland) Act 1982 (c. 43))
Drainage Rates Act 1958 (repealed)	6 & 7 Eliz. 2. c. 37	7 July 1958
An Act to amend the provisions of the Land Drainage Act, 1930, (Note: Land Drainage Act 1930 (20 & 21 Geo. 5. c. 44)) relating to the ascertainment of annual value for the purposes of drainage rates; and for purposes connected therewith. (Repealed by Land Drainage Act 1976 (c. 70))
Defence Contracts Act 1958	6 & 7 Eliz. 2. c. 38	7 July 1958
An Act to amend the enactments authorising the use of patented inventions and registered designs for the services of the Crown in respect of articles required for defence and similar purposes by the Governments of allied or associated countries or the United Nations; to make permanent provision with respect to the use for defence and similar purposes of other technical information protected by contractual arrangements; to repeal certain emergency provisions relating to inventions and designs; and for purposes connected with the matters aforesaid.
Maintenance Orders Act 1958	6 & 7 Eliz. 2. c. 39	7 July 1958
An Act to make provision for the registration in the High Court or a magistrates' court of certain maintenance orders made by the order of those courts or a county court and with respect to the enforcement and variation of registered orders; to make provision for the attachment of sums falling to be paid by way of wages, salary or other earnings or by way of pension for the purpose of enforcing certain maintenance orders; to amend section seventy-four of the Magistrates' Courts Act, 1952; (Note: Magistrates' Courts Act 1952 (15 & 16 Geo. 6 & 1 Eliz. 2. c. 55)) to make provision for the review of committals to prison by magistrates' courts for failure to comply with maintenance orders; to enable Orders in Council under section twelve of the Maintenance Orders (Facilities for Enforcement) Act, 1920, (Note: Maintenance Orders (Facilities for Enforcement) Act 1920 (10 & 11 Geo. 5. c. 33)) to be revoked or varied; and for purposes connected with the matters aforesaid.
Matrimonial Proceedings (Children) Act 1958	6 & 7 Eliz. 2. c. 40	7 July 1958
An Act to extend the powers of courts to make orders in respect of children in connection with proceedings between husband and wife and to require arrangements with respect to children to be made to the satisfaction of the court before the making of a decree in such proceedings.
Distribution of Industry (Industrial Finance) Act 1958 (repealed)	6 & 7 Eliz. 2. c. 41	23 July 1958
An Act to enable the Treasury to give assistance under section four of the Distribution of Industry Act, 1945, (Note: Distribution of Industry Act 1945 (8 & 9 Geo. 6. c. 36)) for reducing unemployment in localities suffering from a high rate of unemployment. (Repealed by Local Employment Act 1960 (8 & 9 Eliz. 2. c. 18))
Housing (Financial Provisions) Act 1958 (repealed)	6 & 7 Eliz. 2. c. 42	23 July 1958
An Act to consolidate certain enactments relating to the giving of financial assistance for the provision of housing accommodation and to other financial matters. (Repealed by Housing (Consequential Provisions) Act 1985 (c. 71))
Horse Breeding Act 1958 (repealed)	6 & 7 Eliz. 2. c. 43	23 July 1958
An Act to consolidate the Horse Breeding Act, 1918, (Note: Horse Breeding Act 1918 (8 & 9 Geo. 5. c. 13)) and the Animals Act, 1948. (Note: Animals Act 1948 (11 & 12 Geo. 6. c. 35)) (Repealed by Animal Health and Welfare Act 1984 (c. 40))
Dramatic and Musical Performers' Protection Act 1958 (repealed)	6 & 7 Eliz. 2. c. 44	23 July 1958
An Act to consolidate the Dramatic and Musical Performers' Protection Act, 1925, (Note: Dramatic and Musical Performers' Protection Act 1925 (15 & 16 Geo. 5. c. 46)) and the provisions of the Copyright Act, 1956, (Note: Copyright Act 1956 (4 & 5 Eliz. 2. c. 74)) amending it. (Repealed by Copyright, Designs and Patents Act 1988 (c. 48))
Prevention of Fraud (Investments) Act 1958 (repealed)	6 & 7 Eliz. 2. c. 45	23 July 1958
An Act to consolidate the Prevention of Fraud (Investments) Act, 1939, (Note: Prevention of Fraud (Investments) Act 1939 (2 & 3 Geo. 6. c. 16)) section one hundred and seventeen of the Companies Act, 1947, (Note: Companies Act 1947 (10 & 11 Geo. 6. c. 47)) and so much of the Companies Act, 1948, (Note: Companies Act 1948 (11 & 12 Geo. 6. c. 38)) as relates to the enactments aforesaid. (Repealed by Financial Services Act 1986 (c. 60))
Statute Law Revision Act 1958	6 & 7 Eliz. 2. c. 46	23 July 1958
An Act to revise the statute law by repealing enactments which have ceased to be in force or have become unnecessary and re-enacting a provision of certain Acts which are otherwise spent.
Agricultural Marketing Act 1958	6 & 7 Eliz. 2. c. 47	23 July 1958
An Act to consolidate the Agricultural Marketing Acts, 1931 to 1949 (other than the provisions thereof relating to the sale of eggs), and certain other enactments conferring powers on boards administering schemes under those Acts regulating the marketing of milk, with corrections and improvements made under the Consolidation of Enactments (Procedure) Act, 1949. (Note: Consolidation of Enactments (Procedure) Act 1949 (12, 13 & 14 Geo. 6. c. 33))
Metropolitan Police Act 1839 (Amendment) Act 1958 (repealed)	6 & 7 Eliz. 2. c. 48	23 July 1958
An Act to amend section fifty-four of the Metropolitan Police Act, 1839, (Note: Metropolitan Police Act 1839 (2 & 3 Vict. c. 47)) for the purpose of increasing the maximum penalty for threatening, abusive or insulting words or behaviour in any thoroughfare or public place. (Repealed by Criminal Justice Act 1967 (c. 80))
Trading Representations (Disabled Persons) Act 1958 (repealed)	6 & 7 Eliz. 2. c. 49	23 July 1958
An Act to control the making of representations by traders with respect to the employment or assistance of blind or other disabled persons in connection with the production, preparation, packing or sale of goods, and for purposes connected therewith. (Repealed by Consumer Protection from Unfair Trading Regulations 2008 (SI 2008/1277))
Local Government (Omnibus Shelters and Queue Barriers) (Scotland) Act 1958	6 & 7 Eliz. 2. c. 50	23 July 1958
An Act to make provision as to the erection and maintenance of omnibus shelters and queue barriers by local authorities in Scotland; and for purposes connected therewith.
Public Records Act 1958	6 & 7 Eliz. 2. c. 51	23 July 1958
An Act to make new provision with respect to public records and the Public Record Office, and for connected purposes.
Costs of Leases Act 1958	6 & 7 Eliz. 2. c. 52	23 July 1958
An Act to make provision for the incidence of the costs of leases. (Repealed for Northern Ireland by Solicitors (Northern Ireland) Order 1976 (SI 1976/582 (N.I. 12)))
Variation of Trusts Act 1958	6 & 7 Eliz. 2. c. 53	23 July 1958
An Act to extend the jurisdiction of courts of law to vary trusts in the interests of beneficiaries and sanction dealings with trust property.
Divorce (Insanity and Desertion) Act 1958 (repealed)	6 & 7 Eliz. 2. c. 54	23 July 1958
An Act to amend the law as to the circumstances in which, for the purposes of proceedings for divorce in England or Scotland, a person is to be treated as having been continuously under care and treatment and as to the effect of insanity on desertion; and to enable a petition for divorce to be presented on the ground of desertion notwithstanding any separation agreement entered into before desertion became a ground for divorce in English law. (Repealed for England and Wales by Matrimonial Causes Act 1965 (c. 72) and for Scotland by Divorce (Scotland) Act 1976 (c. 39))
Local Government Act 1958	6 & 7 Eliz. 2. c. 55	23 July 1958
An Act to make further provision, as respects England and Wales, with respect to grants to local or police authorities, with respect to the rating of industrial and freight-transport hereditaments and of transport, electricity and gas authorities, with respect to the making of changes in the area, name, status and functions of local authorities, and with respect to local government finance and elections; to amend the law in England and Wales and in Northern Ireland as to the making by trustees of loans to local and other authorities; and for purposes connected with the matters aforesaid.
Finance Act 1958	6 & 7 Eliz. 2. c. 56	1 August 1958
An Act to grant certain duties, to alter other duties, and to amend the law relating to the National Debt and the Public Revenue, and to make further provision in connection with Finance.
Appropriation Act 1958 (repealed)	6 & 7 Eliz. 2. c. 57	1 August 1958
An Act to apply a sum out of the Consolidated Fund to the service of the year ending on the thirty-first day of March one thousand nine hundred and fifty-nine, and to appropriate the supplies granted in this Session of Parliament. (Repealed by Statute Law Revision Act 1964 (c. 79))
Medical Act 1956 (Amendment) Act 1958 (repealed)	6 & 7 Eliz. 2. c. 58	1 August 1958
An Act to amend the provisions of the Medical Act, 1956, (Note: Medical Act 1956 (4 & 5 Eliz. 2. c. 76)) relating to the experience required for full registration and to applications for provisional registration, and of the First Schedule to that Act relating to fees, expenses and allowances. (Repealed by Medical Act 1983 (c. 54))
State of Singapore Act 1958 (repealed)	6 & 7 Eliz. 2. c. 59	1 August 1958
An Act to provide for the establishment of the State of Singapore and for the peace, order and good government thereof; and for purposes connected with the matters aforesaid. (Repealed by Malaysia Act 1963 (c. 35))
Chequers Estate Act 1958	6 & 7 Eliz. 2. c. 60	1 August 1958
An Act to amend the deed of settlement set out in the Schedule to the Chequers Estate Act 1917; (Note: Chequers Estate Act 1917 (7 & 8 Geo. 5. c. 55)) to authorise the payment of Exchequer grants in aid of the expenses of the administrative trustees under that deed, as amended; and for purposes connected with the matters aforesaid.
Interest on Damages (Scotland) Act 1958	6 & 7 Eliz. 2. c. 61	1 August 1958
An Act to amend the law of Scotland relating to the power of the courts to order payment of interest on damages.
Merchant Shipping (Liability of Shipowners and Others) Act 1958 (repealed)	6 & 7 Eliz. 2. c. 62	1 August 1958
An Act to amend Part VIII of the Merchant Shipping Act 1894, (Note: Merchant Shipping Act 1894 (57 & 58 Vict. c. 60)) and section two of the Merchant Shipping (Liability of Shipowners and others) Act 1900; (Note: Merchant Shipping (Liability of Shipowners and others) Act 1900 (63 & 64 Vict. c. 32)) and for purposes connected therewith. (Repealed by Merchant Shipping Act 1979 (c. 39) and Merchant Shipping (Registration, etc.) Act 1993 (c. 22))
Park Lane Improvement Act 1958	6 & 7 Eliz. 2. c. 63	1 August 1958
An Act to authorise the London County Council to carry out certain street improvements in the vicinity of Park Lane partly on lands comprised in Hyde Park and the Green Park and partly on other lands; and for purposes connected therewith.
Local Government and Miscellaneous Financial Provisions (Scotland) Act 1958	6 & 7 Eliz. 2. c. 64	1 August 1958
An Act to make new provision for grants out of the Exchequer to local authorities in Scotland and otherwise to amend the law of Scotland relating to local government finance and administration; to abolish the Education (Scotland) Fund; to amend the law of Scotland relating to the valuation for rating of industrial and freight transport lands and heritages and premises of Gas Boards, and to the sittings of valuation appeal committees; to extend the power of trustees under the Trusts (Scotland) Act, 1921, (Note: Trusts (Scotland) Act 1921 (11 & 12 Geo. 5. c. 58)) to lend money to local authorities; to provide for increase of the fees payable in Scotland under certain enactments relating to marriage and to registration of births, deaths and marriages; and for purposes connected with the matters aforesaid.
Children Act 1958 (repealed)	6 & 7 Eliz. 2. c. 65	1 August 1958
An Act to make fresh provision for the protection of children living away from their parents; to amend the law relating to the adoption of children; and for purposes connected with the matters aforesaid. (Repealed for England and Wales by Foster Children Act 1980 (c. 6) and for Scotland by Foster Children (Scotland) Act 1984 (c. 56))
Tribunals and Inquiries Act 1958 (repealed)	6 & 7 Eliz. 2. c. 66	1 August 1958
An Act to constitute a Council on Tribunals; to make further provision as to the appointment, qualifications and removal of the chairman and members, and as to the procedure, of certain tribunals; to provide for appeals to the courts from decisions of, or on appeal from, certain tribunals; to require the giving of reasons for certain decisions of tribunals and Ministers; to extend the supervisory powers of the High Court and the Court of Session; to abolish certain restrictions on appeals from the Court of Session to the House of Lords; to make further provision with respect to the appointment and qualifications of General Commissioners of Income Tax, and provision for the payment of allowances to General and Additional Commissioners; and for purposes connected with the matters aforesaid. (Repealed by Tribunals and Inquiries Act 1971 (c. 62), House of Commons Disqualification Act 1975 (c. 24) and Northern Ireland Assembly Disqualification Act 1975 (c. 25))
Water Act 1958 (repealed)	6 & 7 Eliz. 2. c. 67	1 August 1958
An Act to confer powers to meet deficiencies in the supply of water due to exceptional shortage of rain and to revoke, with savings, Defence Regulations 50A and 56. (Repealed for Scotland by Water (Scotland) Act 1980 (c. 45) and for England and Wales and Northern Ireland by Statute Law (Repeals) Act 1986 (c. 12))
Landlord and Tenant (Temporary Provisions) Act 1958	6 & 7 Eliz. 2. c. 68	1 August 1958
An Act to prohibit the recovery of possession, except by legal proceedings, of certain dwelling-houses released from control by subsection (1) of section eleven of the Rent Act, 1957, (Note: Rent Act 1957 (5 & 6 Eliz. 2. c. 25)) and to provide in certain cases for suspending for a limited period the execution of any order made in such proceedings; to regulate the terms and conditions as to rent and other matters to be applied in cases where possession of such dwelling-houses is retained pending the recovery of possession; and for purposes connected with the matters aforesaid.
Opencast Coal Act 1958	6 & 7 Eliz. 2. c. 69	1 August 1958
An Act to make provision with respect to the working of coal by opencast operations, including provision for the compulsory acquisition by the National Coal Board of rights over land and provision for the payment of compensation in connection therewith; to provide for adjustments between landlords and tenants, and in respect of mortgages, mining leases and orders conferring working rights, in consequence of the authorisation of such operations or of the acquisition by the Board of such rights over land; and for purposes connected with the matters aforesaid.
Slaughterhouses Act 1958 (repealed)	6 & 7 Eliz. 2. c. 70	1 August 1958
An Act to make provision with respect to slaughterhouses and knackers' yards and the slaughter of animals; and for purposes connected therewith. (Repealed by Slaughterhouses Act 1974 (c. 3))
Agriculture Act 1958	6 & 7 Eliz. 2. c. 71	1 August 1958
An Act to amend the Agriculture Act, 1947, (Note: Agriculture Act 1947 (10 & 11 Geo. 6. c. 48)) the Agricultural Holdings Act, 1948, (Note: Agricultural Holdings Act 1948 (11 & 12 Geo. 6. c. 63)) the Agriculture (Scotland) Act, 1948, (Note: Agriculture (Scotland) Act 1948 (11 & 12 Geo. 6. c. 45)) and the Agricultural Holdings (Scotland) Act, 1949; (Note: Agricultural Holdings (Scotland) Act 1949 (12, 13 & 14 Geo. 6. c. 75)) to require the landlord of an agricultural holding in certain cases to provide, repair or alter fixed equipment on the holding; to amend Part II of the Landlord and Tenant Act, 1954, (Note: Landlord and Tenant Act 1954 (2 & 3 Eliz. 2. c. 56)) as to tenancies of agricultural land excluded therefrom; to amend the Schedule to the Corn Production Acts (Repeal) Act, 1921, (Note: Corn Production Acts (Repeal) Act 1921 (11 & 12 Geo. 5. c. 48)) and section twenty-one of the Hill Farming Act, 1946; (Note: Hill Farming Act 1946 (9 & 10 Geo. 6. c. 73)) and for purposes connected with the matters aforesaid.
Insurance Companies Act 1958 (repealed)	6 & 7 Eliz. 2. c. 72	1 August 1958
An Act to consolidate the Assurance Companies Acts, 1909 to 1946, and the enactments amending those Acts with corrections and improvements made under the Consolidation of Enactments (Procedure) Act, 1949. (Repealed by Financial Services and Markets Act 2000 (Consequential Amendments and Savings) (Industrial Assurance) Order 2001 (SI 2001/3647))

=== Local acts ===
Short title	Citation	Royal assent
Long title
Forth Road Bridge Order Confirmation Act 1958	6 & 7 Eliz. 2. c. vi	20 February 1958
An Act to confirm a Provisional Order under the Private Legislation Procedure (Scotland) Act 1936 (Note: Private Legislation Procedure (Scotland) Act 1936 (26 Geo. 5 & 1 Edw. 8. c. 52)) relating to the Forth Road Bridge.
	Forth Road Bridge Order 1958 Provisional Order to authorise the Forth Road Bridge Joint Board to acquire additional lands and to construct further works to repeal the provisions of the Forth Road Bridge Orders 1947 to 1954 relative to the financing of the undertakings of the said board and to enact new provisions with respect thereto and for other purposes.	
Mersey Docks and Harbour Board Act 1958	6 & 7 Eliz. 2. c. vii	30 April 1958
An Act to make further provision with respect to rates and charges leviable by the Mersey Docks and Harbour Board to increase the borrowing powers of the Board and for other purposes.
Tyne Improvement Act 1958 (repealed)	6 & 7 Eliz. 2. c. viii	30 April 1958
An Act to amend the provisions relating to the superannuation fund established by the Tyne Improvement Commissioners to empower the said Commissioners to borrow further money and for other purposes. (Repealed by Port of Tyne Reorganisation Scheme 1967 Confirmation Order 1968 (SI 1968/942))
Corporation of the Sons of the Clergy Charities Scheme Confirmation Act 1958	6 & 7 Eliz. 2. c. ix	14 May 1958
An Act to confirm a Scheme of the Charity Commissioners for the application or management of certain Charities known as the Corporation of the Sons of the Clergy.
	Scheme for the application or management of the following charities:—: 1. The several Charities specified in the schedules to this Scheme, administered by the body corporate called the Governours of Charity for Releefe of the Poor Widdowes and Children of Clergymen (commonly known as the Corporation of the Sons of the Clergy)	
Reading Almshouse and Municipal Charities Scheme Confirmation Act 1958 (repealed)	6 & 7 Eliz. 2. c. x	14 May 1958
An Act to confirm a Scheme of the Charity Commissioners for the application or management of certain Charities in the County Borough of Reading. (Repealed by Statute Law (Repeals) Act 2013 (c. 2))
	Scheme for the Application or Management of the following Charity:—: 1. The Consolidated General Almshouse Charities of Reading comprised in a Scheme confirmed by the Act 24 and 25 Vict. c. 23 (Note: Reading Charities Act 1861 (24 & 25 Vict. c. 23)) and in Schemes of the Charity Commissioners of the 27th August 1888 and the 28th February 1899; 2. The Charity of Thomas Barkshire, founded by will proved in the Principal Registry on the 23rd November 1880, for the inmates of the almshouses under the control of the Trustees of the Municipal (General) Charities; 3. The Charity of Thomas Cooke, founded by second codicil to will proved with three codicils thereto in the Prerogative Court of Canterbury in November 1811, for the almshouses founded by John Webb; 4. The Charity of Edward Simeon for the Obelisk in the Market Place, founded by gift on or about the 7th January 1805 and comprised in a Scheme of the said Commissioners of the 2nd January 1912; 5. The Charity of Martin Hope Sutton, founded by first codicil to will proved with two codicils thereto in the Principal Registry on the 19th November 1901; 6. The Charity of William Vine, founded by will proved at Oxford on the 11th January 1904; all of which Charities are together known as the Municipal (General) Charities; 7. The Consolidated Church Almshouse Charities of Reading, comprised in the above-mentioned Scheme confirmed by the Act 24 and 25 Vict. c. 23 and in a Scheme of the said Commissions of the 2nd March 1915, being one of the Municipal (Church) Charities.	
Royal Institution of Great Britain Charity Scheme Confirmation Act 1958	6 & 7 Eliz. 2. c. xi	14 May 1958
An Act to confirm a Scheme of the Charity Commissioners for the application or management of the General Charity known as the Royal Institution of Great Britain.
	Scheme for the application or management of the following Charities in the County Borough of Reading:—: 1. The Charity known as The Royal Institution of Great Britain administered by The Members of The Royal Institution of Great Britain under Letters Patent dated the 13th January 40 Geo. III as confirmed and extended by the Act 50 Geo. III c. li (Local and Personal). (Note: Royal Institution of Great Britain Act 1810 (50 Geo. 3. c. li))	
St James's Dwellings Charity Scheme Confirmation Act 1958 (repealed)	6 & 7 Eliz. 2. c. xii	14 May 1958
An Act to confirm a Scheme of the Charity Commissioners for the application or management of the St. James's Dwellings Charity in the City of Westminster. (Repealed by Statute Law (Repeals) Act 2013 (c. 2))
	Scheme for the application or management of the following charity:—: 1. The Charity known as The St. James's Dwellings, in the Ancient Parish of St. James, in the City of Westminster, regulated by a Scheme of the High Court of Justice (Chancery Division) of the 3rd April 1885 as affected or supplemented by the City of Westminster (St. James) Scheme, 1901, and a Scheme of the Charity Commissioners of the 4th November 1932.	
Port of London (Superannuation) Act 1958 (repealed)	6 & 7 Eliz. 2. c. xiii	14 May 1958
An Act to confer further powers on the Port of London Authority with regard to superannuation allowances and for other purposes. (Repealed by Port of London Act 1968 (c. xxxii))
University of Leicester Act 1958	6 & 7 Eliz. 2. c. xiv	14 May 1958
An Act to dissolve the University College Leicester and the University College of Leicester and to transfer the rights property and liabilities of those colleges to the University of Leicester and for other purposes.
Brazilian Traction Subsidiaries Act 1958	6 & 7 Eliz. 2. c. xv	14 May 1958
An Act to make provision for the transfer to the United States of Brazil of the registered offices of the San Paulo Gas Company Limited and the City of Santos Improvements Company Limited for the purpose of enabling those companies to assume Brazilian nationality for the cesser of the application to those companies of the provisions of the Companies Act 1948 (Note: Companies Act 1948 (11 & 12 Geo. 6. c. 38)) consequent upon such assumption and for other purposes incidental thereto.
Cammell Laird and Company Act 1958	6 & 7 Eliz. 2. c. xvi	14 May 1958
An Act to empower Cammell Laird and Company (Shipbuilders and Engineers) Limited to construct further works in the river Mersey and for other purposes.
Pier and Harbour Order (Margate) Confirmation Act 1958 (repealed)	6 & 7 Eliz. 2. c. xvii	7 July 1958
An Act to confirm a Provisional Order made by the Minister of Transport and Civil Aviation under the General Pier and Harbour Act 1861 (Note: General Pier and Harbour Act 1861 (24 & 25 Vict. c. 45)) relating to Margate. (Repealed by Margate Pier and Harbour Revision Order 1992 (SI 1993/1313))
	Margate Pier and Harbour Order 1958 Provisional Order to authorise the Company of Proprietors of the Margate Pier and Harbour to levy rates for the use of any part of their high-water landing pier or jetty to authorise the Company to operate thereon a railway and services of vehicles for carrying passengers and to charge for the use thereof to reduce the number of directors of the Company to amend the provisions as to general assemblies of the Company and for other purposes.	
Holy Trinity Hounslow Act 1958	6 & 7 Eliz. 2. c. xviii	7 July 1958
An Act to authorise the sale of part of the churchyard of Holy Trinity Church Hounslow to authorise the erection of buildings thereon and to provide for the erection by the London Diocesan Fund of a new church on part of the remainder of the said churchyard and for other purposes.
Seaham Harbour Dock Act 1958	6 & 7 Eliz. 2. c. xix	7 July 1958
An Act to confer further powers on the Seaham Harbour Dock Company in relation to lands to make provision with respect to certain of the rates leviable by the Company in respect of the dock and for other purposes.
Blackpool Corporation Act 1958	6 & 7 Eliz. 2. c. xx	7 July 1958
An Blackpool Act to confer further powers upon the mayor aldermen and burgesses of the Borough of Blackpool and to make further provision for the improvement health and local government of the borough and for other purposes.
London County Council (General Powers) Act 1958	6 & 7 Eliz. 2. c. xxi	7 July 1958
An Act to confer further powers upon the London County Council and other authorities and for other purposes.
Clergy Orphan Corporation Act 1958 (repealed)	6 & 7 Eliz. 2. c. xxii	7 July 1958
An Act to change the name of the body corporate named "The Governors of the Society for clothing maintaining and educating poor Orphans of Clergymen of the Established Church in that Part of the United Kingdom of Great Britain called England until of Age to be put Apprentice" to confer powers upon the said Corporation and for other purposes. (Repealed by Charities (Clergy Orphan Corporation) Order 1997 (SI 1997/2240))
Royal Society for the Prevention of Cruelty to Animals Act 1958	6 & 7 Eliz. 2. c. xxiii	7 July 1958
An Act to confer powers upon the Royal Society for the Prevention of Cruelty to Animals and for other purposes.
Essex County Council Act 1958	6 & 7 Eliz. 2. c. xxiv	7 July 1958
An Act to confer further powers on the county council of Essex and local authorities in the county of Essex in relation to highways and buildings and the local government of the county to enact provisions with respect to public entertainments finance superannuation and child welfare and for other purposes.
All Hallows the Great Churchyard Act 1958	6 & 7 Eliz. 2. c. xxv	7 July 1958
An Act to authorise the sale of the churchyard appurtenant to the former church of All Hallows the Great in the city of London to authorise the erection of buildings thereon and for other purposes.
All Hallows the Less Churchyard Act 1958	6 & 7 Eliz. 2. c. xxvi	7 July 1958
An Act to authorise the sale of the churchyard appurtenant to the former church of All Hallows the Less in the city of London to authorise the erection of buildings thereon and for other purposes.
London County Council (Money) Act 1958	6 & 7 Eliz. 2. c. xxvii	7 July 1958
An Act to regulate the expenditure on capital account and lending of money by the London County Council during the financial period from the first day of April nineteen hundred and fifty-eight to the thirtieth day of September nineteen hundred and fifty-nine and for other purposes.
British Transport Commission Order Confirmation Act 1958	6 & 7 Eliz. 2. c. xxviii	23 July 1958
An Act to Confirm a Provisional Order Under the Private Legislation Procedure (Scotland) Act, 1936, relating to the British Transport Commission.
	British Transport Commission Order 1958	
Bradford Corporation (Trolley Vehicles) Order Confirmation Act 1958	6 & 7 Eliz. 2. c. xxix	23 July 1958
An Act to confirm a Provisional Order made by the Minister of Corporation Transport and Civil Aviation under the Bradford Corporation Act 1910 (Note: Bradford Corporation Act 1910 (10 Edw. 7 & 1 Geo. 5. c. cxvii)) relating to Bradford Corporation trolley vehicles.
	Bradford Corporation (Trolley Vehicles) Order 1958	
Maidstone Corporation (Trolley Vehicles) Order Confirmation Act 1958	6 & 7 Eliz. 2. c. xxx	23 July 1958
An Act to confirm a Provisional Order made by the Minister of Transport and Civil Aviation under the Maidstone Corporation Act 1923 (Note: Maidstone Corporation Act 1923 (13 & 14 Geo. 5. c. xxxi)) relating to Maidstone Corporation trolley vehicles.
	Maidstone Corporation (Trolley Vehicles) Order 1958 Provisional Order authorising the mayor aldermen and burgesses of the borough of Maidstone to maintain and use trolley vehicles upon a route in the borough of Maidstone.	
Pier and Harbour Order (Great Yarmouth) Confirmation Act 1958	6 & 7 Eliz. 2. c. xxxi	23 July 1958
An Act to confirm a Provisional Order made by the Minister of Transport and Civil Aviation under the General Pier and Harbour Act 1861 relating to Great Yarmouth.
	Great Yarmouth New Britannia Pier Order 1958 Provisional Order to repeal and amend certain enactments relating to the Great Yarmouth New Britannia Pier Company and for other purposes.	
Pier and Harbour Order (King's Lynn Conservancy) Confirmation Act 1958	6 & 7 Eliz. 2. c. xxxii	23 July 1958
An Act to confirm a Provisional Order made by the Minister of Transport and Civil Aviation under the General Pier and Harbour Act 1861 relating to King's Lynn Conservancy.
South Lancashire Transport Act 1958	6 & 7 Eliz. 2. c. xxxiii	23 July 1958
An Act to transfer the undertaking of the South Lancashire Transport Company to Lancashire United Transport Limited to authorise the discontinuance of the service of trolley vehicles authorised under the South Lancashire Transport Acts and Order 1900 to 1948 and for other purposes.
Penybont Main Sewerage Act 1958	6 & 7 Eliz. 2. c. xxxiv	23 July 1958
An Act for enlarging the powers of the Penybont Main Sewerage Board in regard to the discharge of sewage and effluent and for other purposes.
Gloucester Corporation Act 1958	6 & 7 Eliz. 2. c. xxxv	23 July 1958
An Act to make further provision for the improvement health and local government of the city of Gloucester in the county of the city of Gloucester and for other purposes.
Coventry Corporation Act 1958 (repealed)	6 & 7 Eliz. 2. c. xxxvi	23 July 1958
An Act to confer further powers upon the lord mayor aldermen and citizens of the city of Coventry and to make further provision for the improvement health local government and finances of the city and for other purposes. (Repealed by West Midlands County Council Act 1980 (c. xi))
Waltham Holy Cross Urban District Council Act 1958 (repealed)	6 & 7 Eliz. 2. c. xxxvii	23 July 1958
An Act to empower the urban district council of Waltham Holy Cross to acquire lands and to provide for the extinguishment of common rights in or over Hall Marsh Waltham Marsh Cheshunt Marsh and Town Mead for other purposes. (Repealed by Essex Act 1987 (c. xx))
Rochdale Corporation Act 1958	6 & 7 Eliz. 2. c. xxxviii	23 July 1958
An Act to confer further powers on the mayor aldermen and burgesses of the county borough of Rochdale in relation to lands streets and buildings and the local government health welfare improvement and finances of the borough and to make further provision with reference to their transport and water undertakings and for other purposes.
Ashton-under-Lyne Stalybridge and Dukinfield (District) Waterworks Act 1958	6 & 7 Eliz. 2. c. xxxix	23 July 1958
An Act to authorise the Ashton-under-Lyne Stalybridge and Dukinfield (District) Waterworks Joint Committee to construct additional waterworks and to acquire lands to confer further powers upon the Committee and for other purposes.
Royal School for Deaf Children Margate Act 1958	6 & 7 Eliz. 2. c. xl	23 July 1958
An Act to confer further powers on the Royal School for Deaf and Dumb Children Margate to change the name of the said school and for other purposes.
Pier and Harbour Order (Sheerness) Confirmation Act 1958 (repealed)	6 & 7 Eliz. 2. c. xli	1 August 1958
An Act to confirm a Provisional Order made by the Minister of Transport and Civil Aviation under the General Pier and Harbour Act 1861 relating to Sheerness. (Repealed by Medway Ports Authority Act 1973 (c. xxi))
	Sheerness Pier Order 1958 Provisional Order to provide for the vesting in William Hurst Limited of the Sheerness Pier to confer powers on the said Company with reference thereto and the maintenance management and improvement thereof and for other purposes.	
Surrey County Council Act 1958	6 & 7 Eliz. 2. c. xlii	1 August 1958
An Act to confer further powers on the Surrey County Council and in certain cases on local authorities in the administrative county of Surrey in relation to lands and highways and the local government improvement health and finances of the county and for other purposes.
Falmouth Docks Act 1958 (repealed)	6 & 7 Eliz. 2. c. xliii	1 August 1958
An Act to authorise the raising of additional capital by the Falmouth Docks and Engineering Company and for other purposes. (Repealed by Falmouth Docks Act 1959 (7 & 8 Eliz. 2. c. xl))
British Transport Commission Act 1958	6 & 7 Eliz. 2. c. xliv	1 August 1958
An Act to empower the British Transport Commission to construct works and to acquire lands to provide for the transfer of the Haddiscoe New Cut to the East Suffolk and Norfolk River Board and to confer powers on the river board and on the Great Yarmouth Port and Haven Commissioners and their statutory committees in relation thereto to extend the time for the compulsory purchase of certain lands to confer further powers on the Commission and for other purposes.
Tees Valley and Cleveland Water Act 1958	6 & 7 Eliz. 2. c. xlv	1 August 1958
An Act to make provision with respect to the discharge of compensation water by the Tees Valley and Cleveland Water Board to confer further powers upon the Board and for other purposes.
Falmouth Harbour Act 1958	6 & 7 Eliz. 2. c. xlvi	1 August 1958
An Act to empower the Falmouth Harbour Commissioners to borrow additional moneys to make further provision with respect to the rates leviable by them to confer on them additional powers and for other purposes.
City of London (Various Powers) Act 1958	6 & 7 Eliz. 2. c. xlvii	1 August 1958
An Act to confer further powers on the corporation of London with respect to lands to permit the appropriation for housing of land forming part of and adjacent to the Metropolitan Cattle Market Islington to make provision for the delegation to the corporation of certain planning powers in respect of the city of London conferred on the London County Council by the Town and Country Planning Act 1947 (Note: Town and Country Planning Act 1947 (10 & 11 Geo. 6. c. 51)) and for other purposes.
Shell (Stanlow to Partington Pipeline) Act 1958	6 & 7 Eliz. 2. c. xlviii	1 August 1958
An Act to empower the Shell Petroleum Company Limited to construct pipelines between the Stanlow Oil Refinery and the Partington Chemical Works and to acquire lands and for other purposes.
Birmingham Corporation Act 1958	6 & 7 Eliz. 2. c. xlix	1 August 1958
An Act to confer further powers upon the lord mayor aldermen and citizens of the city of Birmingham and to make further provision for the improvement health local government and finances of the city and for other purposes.
Wallasey Corporation Act 1958	6 & 7 Eliz. 2. c. l	1 August 1958
An Act to confer further powers upon the mayor aldermen and burgesses of the borough of Wallasey with reference to lands and to their undertakings to make further provision for the improvement health local government and finances of the borough and for other purposes.

=== Sources ===
- The Public General Acts and Church Assembly Measures 1958. London: Her Majesty's Stationery Office. 1959. p. 1-1107 – via Google Books.
- The Journals of the House of Commons (PDF). Vol. 213 (November 1957 – October 1958). pp. 3–313 – via parliament.uk.
- Chronological Table of the Statutes: Covering the Period from 1235 to the End of 1971. London: Her Majesty's Stationery Office. 1972. pp. 1136–1149. ISBN 978-0-11-840096-1 – via Google Books.
- "UK Public General Acts from 1958". legislation.gov.uk. The National Archives.
- "UK Local Acts from 1958". legislation.gov.uk. The National Archives.
- "Chronological Tables of Local Acts: Part 179 (1956-1958)". legislation.gov.uk. The National Archives.

== 7 & 8 Eliz. 2 ==
The fourth session of the 41st Parliament of the United Kingdom, which met from 28 October 1958 until 18 September 1959.

=== Public general acts ===
Short title	Citation	Royal assent
Long title
Armed Forces (Housing Loans) Act 1958	7 & 8 Eliz. 2. c. 1	18 December 1958
An Act to amend the Armed Forces (Housing Loans) Act, 1949. (Note: Armed Forces (Housing Loans) Act 1949 (12, 13 & 14 Geo. 6. c. 77))
Agricultural Mortgage Corporation Act 1958 (repealed)	7 & 8 Eliz. 2. c. 2	18 December 1958
An Act to enlarge the amounts which may be advanced to the Agricultural Mortgage Corporation Limited by the Minister of Agriculture, Fisheries and Food for the purpose of increasing the Corporation's guarantee fund, and to extend the period during which the Minister may give the Corporation assistance by way of annual grant or loan. (Repealed by Statute Law (Repeals) Act 1977 (c. 18))
Development of Inventions Act 1958 (repealed)	7 & 8 Eliz. 2. c. 3	18 December 1958
An Act to extend the period during which advances may be made to the National Research Development Corporation out of the Consolidated Fund and to increase the limit on such advances. (Repealed by Development of Inventions Act 1965 (c. 21))
Expiring Laws Continuance Act 1958 (repealed)	7 & 8 Eliz. 2. c. 4	18 December 1958
An Act to continue certain expiring laws. (Repealed by Statute Law Revision Act 1963 (c. 30))
Adoption Act 1958 (repealed)	7 & 8 Eliz. 2. c. 5	18 December 1958
An Act to consolidate the enactments relating to the adoption of children. (Repealed for England and Wales by Adoption Act 1976 (c. 36) and for Scotland by Adoption (Scotland) Act 1978 (c. 28))
National Debt Act 1958 (repealed)	7 & 8 Eliz. 2. c. 6	18 December 1958
An Act to consolidate certain enactments relating to the national debt. (Repealed by National Debt Act 1972 (c. 65))
Manœuvres Act 1958 or the Manoeuvres Act 1958	7 & 8 Eliz. 2. c. 7	18 December 1958
An Act to consolidate certain enactments relating to defence Manœuvres.
Slaughter of Animals Act 1958 (repealed)	7 & 8 Eliz. 2. c. 8	18 December 1958
An Act to consolidate certain enactments relating to the slaughter of animals. (Repealed by Slaughterhouses Act 1974 (c. 3))
Representation of the People (Amendment) Act 1958 (repealed)	7 & 8 Eliz. 2. c. 9	18 December 1958
An Act to repeal section eighty-eight of the Representation of the People Act, 1949. (Note: Representation of the People Act 1949 (12, 13 & 14 Geo. 6. c. 68)) (Repealed by Representation of the People Act 1969 (c. 15))

=== Local acts ===
Short title	Citation	Royal assent
Long title
Church of Scotland Trust Order Confirmation Act 1958	7 & 8 Eliz. 2. c. i	18 December 1958
An Act to confirm a Provisional Order under the Private Legislation Procedure (Scotland) Act 1936 (Note: Private Legislation Procedure (Scotland) Act 1936 (26 Geo. 5 & 1 Edw. 8. c. 52)) relating to the Church of Scotland Trust.
North of Scotland Electricity Order Confirmation Act 1958	7 & 8 Eliz. 2. c. ii	18 December 1958
An Act to confirm a Provisional Order under the Private Legislation Procedure (Scotland) Act 1936 relating to North of Scotland Electricity.
	North of Scotland Electricity Order 1958 Provisional Order to consolidate certain local enactments applying to the North of Scotland Hydro-Electric Board with such amendments as are required to facilitate consolidation and secure a uniform statutory code applicable throughout the North of Scotland District to confer further powers on the said Board and for other purposes.	
Society in Scotland for Propagating Christian Knowledge Order Confirmation Act 1958	7 & 8 Eliz. 2. c. iii	18 December 1958
An Act to confirm a Provisional Order under the Private Legislation Procedure (Scotland) Act 1936 relating to Society in Scotland for Propagating Christian Knowledge.
	Society in Scotland for Propagating Christian Knowledge Order 1958 Provisional Order to extend the powers of the directors of the Society in Scotland for Propagating Christian Knowledge with respect to the investment of the funds belonging to or held by them and for other purposes.	
Glasgow Corporation Order Confirmation Act 1958	7 & 8 Eliz. 2. c. iv	18 December 1958
An Act to confirm a Provisional Order under the Private Legislation Procedure (Scotland) Act 1936 relating to Glasgow Corporation
	Glasgow Corporation Order 1958 Provisional Order to authorise the corporation of the city of Glasgow to borrow further moneys for the purposes of their tramway undertaking to amend the provisions of the Glasgow Corporation Superannuation Scheme 1955 with respect to the investment of the fund maintained by the said Corporation in pursuance of the said scheme and for other purposes.	
Edinburgh Corporation Order Confirmation Act 1958	7 & 8 Eliz. 2. c. v	18 December 1958
An Act to confirm a Provisional Order under the Private Legislation Procedure (Scotland) Act 1936 relating to Edinburgh Corporation
	Edinburgh Corporation Order 1958 Provisional Order to consolidate with amendments the Acts and Orders of or relating to the Corporation of the city of Edinburgh with respect to the general administration of the city and the water and transport and certain other undertakings and services of the said Corporation and finance of the city and to confer further powers on them with respect thereto and for other purposes.	
Kent County Council Act 1958	7 & 8 Eliz. 2. c. vi	18 December 1958
An Act to confer further powers on the Kent County Council and local authorities in the county of Kent in relation to lands and highways and the local government improvement health and finances of the county and for other purposes.
Manchester Corporation Act 1958	7 & 8 Eliz. 2. c. vii	18 December 1958
An Act to authorise the lord mayor aldermen and citizens of the city of Manchester to construct street works and other works and to purchase lands compulsorily for those and other purposes to make further provision with regard to lands to make provision for the improvement health local government and finances of the city and to provide for the transfer to the said lord mayor aldermen and citizens of the undertaking of the Ardwick Cemetery Limited and for other purposes.

=== Sources ===
- The Public General Acts and Church Assembly Measures 1958. London: Her Majesty's Stationery Office. 1959. p. 1108-1188 – via Google Books.
- The Journals of the House of Commons (PDF). Vol. 214 (October 1958 – September 1959). pp. 3–327 – via parliament.uk.
- Chronological Table of the Statutes: Covering the Period from 1235 to the End of 1971. London: Her Majesty's Stationery Office. 1972. pp. 1149–1151. ISBN 978-0-11-840096-1 – via Google Books.
- "UK Public General Acts from 1958". legislation.gov.uk. The National Archives.
- "UK Local Acts from 1958". legislation.gov.uk. The National Archives.
- "Chronological Tables of Local Acts: Part 180 (1958-1960)". legislation.gov.uk. The National Archives.

== See also ==
- List of acts of the Parliament of the United Kingdom
