= Foster Children (Scotland) Act 1984 =

Act of the Parliament of the United Kingdom

Foster Children (Scotland) Act 1984 (Note: Section 23(1).)
- Act of Parliament
- Parliament of the United Kingdom
- Long title: An Act to consolidate certain enactments relating to foster children as they have effect in Scotland.
- Citation: 1984 c. 56
- Territorial extent: Scotland (Note: Section 23(3).)

Dates
- Royal assent: 31 October 1984
- Commencement: 31 January 1985 (Note: Section 23(2).)

Other legislation
- Amends: See § Repealed enactments
- Repeals/revokes: See § Repealed enactments
- Amended by: Children Act 1989; Statute Law (Repeals) Act 1993; Local Government etc. (Scotland) Act 1994; Children (Scotland) Act 1995; Criminal Procedure (Consequential Provisions) (Scotland) Act 1995; Crime and Punishment (Scotland) Act 1997; Regulation of Care (Scotland) Act 2001; Mental Health (Care and Treatment) (Scotland) Act 2003 (Modification of Enactments) Order 2005; Joint Inspection of Children's Services and Inspection of Social Work Services (Scotland) Act 2006; Family Law (Scotland) Act 2006 (Consequential Modifications) Order 2006; Adoption and Children (Scotland) Act 2007; Protection of Vulnerable Groups (Scotland) Act 2007; Criminal Justice and Licensing (Scotland) Act 2010; Adoption and Children (Scotland) Act 2007 (Modification of Enactments) Order 2010; Public Services Reform (Scotland) Act 2010 (Consequential Modifications) Order 2011; Children's Hearings (Scotland) Act 2011 (Modification of Primary Legislation) Order 2013; Disclosure (Scotland) Act 2020; Health and Care Act 2022 (Further Consequential Amendments) Regulations 2022

Status: Amended

Text of statute as originally enacted

Revised text of statute as amended

Text of the Foster Children (Scotland) Act 1984 as in force today (including any amendments) within the United Kingdom, from legislation.gov.uk.

The Foster Children (Scotland) Act 1984 (c. 56) is an act of the Parliament of the United Kingdom that consolidated enactments relating to foster children in Scotland.

The Foster Children Act 1980 made equivalent provisions for England and Wales.

== Provisions ==
=== Repealed enactments ===
Section 22(3) of the act repealed 12 enactments, listed in schedule 3 to the act.

Enactments repealed by section 22(3)
Citation	Short title	Extent of repeal
6 & 7 Eliz. 2. c. 65	Children Act 1958	The whole act.
8 & 9 Eliz. 2. c. 61	Mental Health (Scotland) Act 1960	In schedule 4, the entry relating to the Children Act 1958.
1968 c. 49	Social Work (Scotland) Act 1968	Section 19, schedule 1 and in schedule 8, paragraphs 44 to 47.
1969 c. 54	Children and Young Persons Act 1969	Sections 56 and 57(1).
1973 c. 65	Local Government (Scotland) Act 1973	In schedule 27, paragraph 140.
1975 c. 72	Children Act 1975	Sections 95, 96, 97. In schedule 3, paragraphs 17 to 20.
1976 c. 36	Adoption Act 1976	In schedule 3, part II, paragraphs 25 and 26.
1978 c. 28	Adoption (Scotland) Act 1978	In schedule 3, paragraphs 1 to 3.
1980 c. 5	Child Care Act 1980	In schedule 5, paragraphs 9 to 11.
1980 c. 6	Foster Children Act 1980	In schedule 2, part H.
1980 c. 44	Education (Scotland) Act 1980	In schedule 4, paragraph 1.
1983 c. 41	Health and Social Services and Social Security Adjudications Act 1983	In schedule 2, paragraph 2.

== Subsequent developments ==
The act has been amended several times since its enactment. The Children Act 1989 amended sections 1 and 2(2)(f), effective 14 October 1991. The Children (Scotland) Act 1995 made further substantial amendments to sections 2, 3 and 7, and restricted the application of the act by providing that a child provided with refuge under section 38(5) of that act would not be treated as a foster child under the 1984 act; these changes came into force on 1 April 1997. The Regulation of Care (Scotland) Act 2001 amended section 2(2)(d), effective 1 April 2002. Subsequent amendments have been made by the Adoption and Children (Scotland) Act 2007, the Criminal Justice and Licensing (Scotland) Act 2010, and the Disclosure (Scotland) Act 2020.
