= Secure children's home =

Secure children's homes (SCHs) in England and Wales are specialised residential facilities that provide care and education for young people who are either remanded by the court or placed for their own protection due to their high levels of vulnerability. These homes cater to children aged 10 to 17 years old who present significant risks to themselves or others and require a secure environment to ensure their safety and well-being.

== Overview ==
Secure Children's Homes are distinct from other types of secure accommodation, such as Youth Offender Institutions (YOIs) and Secure Training Centres (STCs), in that they focus on providing intensive support, rehabilitation, and therapeutic interventions tailored to the individual needs of each child. SCHs are designed to be small-scale environments to ensure personalised care and a higher staff-to-child ratio.

== List of registered facilities ==
Secure Children's Home Register as of July 2024
SCH Name	Registered Provider	Number of Beds	Ofsted Rating	Location
Adel Beck Secure Children's Home	Leeds City Council	24	Good	Google Maps
Aldine House Secure Centre	Sheffield City Council	12	Requires improvement to be good	Google Maps
Atkinson Secure Children's Home	Devon County Council	8	Outstanding	Google Maps
Aycliffe Secure Services	Durham County Council	34	Good	Google Maps
Barton Moss Secure Care Centre	Salford City Council	27	Good	Google Maps
Clare Lodge	Peterborough City Council	16	Good	Google Maps
Clayfields House Secure Unit	Nottinghamshire County Council	20	Good	Google Maps
Hillside Secure Children's Home	Neath Port Talbot County Borough Council	18		Google Maps
Kyloe House	Northumberland County Council	15	Good	Google Maps
Lansdowne Secure Unit	East Sussex County Council	7	Good	Google Maps
Lincolnshire Secure Unit	Lincolnshire County Council	12	Good	Google Maps
Marydale Lodge	Nugent Care, allied to RC Archdiocese of Liverpool	12	Outstanding	Google Maps
Swanwick Lodge	Hampshire County Council	10	Outstanding	Google Maps
Vinney Green Secure Unit	South Gloucestershire Council	24	Good	Google Maps

== Legal and policy framework ==
The operation of Secure Children's Homes in England and Wales is governed by a robust legal and policy framework designed to ensure the safety, welfare, and rights of the children in their care. Key legislation and guidelines include:

=== Children Act 1989 ===
- Provides the foundational legal framework for the care and protection of children, including those placed in secure accommodation.
- Emphasises the welfare of the child as the paramount consideration.

=== Care Standards Act 2000 ===
- Regulates the operation of SCHs, ensuring they meet national minimum standards for care, education, and safety.
- SCHs must be registered with and inspected by Ofsted, the regulatory body responsible for children's services.

=== Youth Justice Board (YJB) Guidelines ===
- Sets out the criteria and procedures for placing young offenders in SCHs.
- Focuses on rehabilitation and reducing reoffending through tailored interventions.

=== Secure Accommodation Regulations 1991 ===
- Specifies the conditions under which children can be placed in secure accommodation, ensuring placements are made in the best interest of the child.
- Requires regular reviews and assessments to justify continued placement.

=== Human Rights Act 1998 ===
- Ensures that the rights of children in secure accommodation are protected in accordance with the European Convention on Human Rights.
- Children must be treated with dignity and respect, with access to legal representation and advocacy services.

== Secure Accommodation Network ==
The Secure Accommodation Network (SAN) is a collaborative network of Secure Children's Homes (SCHs) in England and Wales, working together to improve standards of care, share best practices, and advocate for the needs of the children in secure accommodation.
