= List of statutory instruments of the United Kingdom, 1969 =

This is an incomplete list of statutory instruments of the United Kingdom in 1969.

== Statutory instruments ==
=== 1-499 ===
- South Norfolk Water Board Order 1969 (SI 1969/55)
- South East Lancashire and North East Cheshire Passenger Transport Area (Designation) Order 1969 (SI 1969/95)
- Tyneside Passenger Transport Area (Designation) Order 1969 (SI 1969/96)
- West Midlands Passenger Transport Area (Designation) Order 1969 (SI 1969/97)
- North-West Norfolk Water Board Order 1969 (SI 1969/104)
- Courts-Martial Appeal Legal Aid (General) Regulations 1969 (SI 1969/177)
- Transfer of Functions (Wales) Order 1969 (SI 1969/388)
- Motor Vehicles (Competitions and Trials) Regulations 1969 (SI 1969/414)
- North Derbyshire Water Board (Charges) Order 1969 (SI 1969/489)

=== 500-999 ===
- Camborne Mine (Storage Battery Locomotives) Special Regulations 1969 (SI 1969/570)
- Representation of the People Act 1969 (Commencement) Order 1969 (SI 1969/630)
- Cotgrave Mine (Suspended Monorail Diesel Locomotives) Special Regulations 1969 (SI 1969/744)
- "Pelican" Pedestrian Crossings Regulations and General Directions 1969 (SI 1969/888)
- Savings Banks (Ordinary Deposits) (Limits) Order 1969 (SI 1969/939)
- Legal Aid (Extension of Proceedings) (Scotland) Regulations 1969 (SI 1969/955)
- Superannuation (Local Government and Approved Employment) Interchange Rules 1969 (SI 1969/997)

=== 1000-1499 ===
- Medway Ports Reorganisation Scheme 1968 Confirmation Order 1969 (SI 1969/1045)
- Levant Mine (Storage Battery Locomotives) Special Regulations 1969 (SI 1969/1236)
- Post Office Register (Trustee Savings Banks) (Amendment) Regulations 1969 (SI 1969/1311)
- Gwent Water Board Order 1969 (SI 1969/1475)
- Trunk Roads (40 m.p.h. Speed Limit) (No.24) Order 1969 (SI 1969/1480)

=== 1500-1999 ===
- County Court Funds (Amendment No. 2) Rules 1969 (SI 1969/1547)
- National Westminster Bank Act 1969 (Appointed Day) Order 1969 (SI 1969/1705)
- Plant Varieties and Seeds (Isle of Man) Order 1969 (SI 1969/1829)

== See also ==
- List of statutory instruments of the United Kingdom
