= List of statutory instruments of the United Kingdom, 1970 =

This is an incomplete list of statutory instruments of the United Kingdom in 1970.

== Statutory instruments ==
=== 1–499 ===
- British Railways Board (Severn Valley) Light Railway Order 1970 (SI 1970/7)
- Building (Fifth Amendment) Regulations 1970 (SI 1970/109)
- Extradition (Genocide) Order 1970 (SI 1970/147)
- Fugitive Offenders (Genocide) Order 1970 (SI 1970/148)
- Warrington, Runcorn and District Water Board Order 1970 (SI 1970/293)
- Merchant Shipping (Certificates of Competency as A.B.) Regulations 1970 (SI 1970/294)
- Registration of Title (Teesside, Leeds and Sheffield) Order 1970 (SI 1970/485)

=== 500–999 ===
- Abrasive Wheels Regulations 1970 (SI 1970/535)
- Diplomatic Privileges (Citizens of the United Kingdom and Colonies) (Amendment) Order 1970 (SI 1970/635)
- British Railways Board (Severn Valley) Light Railway (Transfer) Order 1970 (SI 1970/778)
- Essex Water Order 1970 (SI 1970/786)

=== 1000–1499 ===
- Superannuation (Judicial Offices) Rules 1970 (SI 1970/1021)
- Synodical Government (Channel Islands) Order 1970 (SI 1970/1117)
- Building (Sixth Amendment) Regulations 1970 (SI 1971/1335)
- Anchors and Chain Cables Rules 1970 (SI 1970/1453)

=== 1500–1999 ===
- Foreign Marriage Order 1970 (SI 1970/1539)
- Parliamentary Constituencies (Scotland) Order 1970 (SI 1970/1680)
- Secretary of State for the Environment Order 1970 (SI 1970/1681)
- Weights and Measures (Local Standards: Limits of Error) Regulations 1970 (SI 1970/1710)
- Working Standards and Testing Equipment Testing and Adjustment) Regulations 1970 (SI 1970/1714)
- Children and Young Persons Act 1969 (Transitional Modifications of Part I) Order 1970 (SI 1970/1882)
- Eurocontrol (Immunities and Privileges) Order 1970 (SI 1970/1940)
- Legal Aid in Criminal Proceedings (General) (Amendment) Regulations 1970 (SI 1970/1980)

== See also ==
- List of statutory instruments of the United Kingdom
