= Children Act 1989 =

Act of the Parliament of the United Kingdom

Children Act 1989 (Note: Section 108(1).)
- Act of Parliament
- Parliament of the United Kingdom
- Long title: An Act to reform the law relating to children; to provide for local authority services for children in need and others; to amend the law with respect to children's homes, community homes, voluntary homes and voluntary organisations; to make provision with respect to fostering, child minding and day care for young children and adoption; and for connected purposes.
- Citation: 1989 c. 41
- Introduced by: The Lord Chancellor, Lord Mackay of Clashfern, 23 November 1988 (Lords)
- Territorial extent: England and Wales (only partially in Wales) (Note: Section 108(10)–(12).)

Dates
- Royal assent: 16 November 1989
- Commencement: 16 November 1989 (s. 89, s. 96(3)–(7), paragraph 35 of Schedule 12); 16 January 1990: Paragraph 36 of Schedule 12; 1 May 1991 (paragraph 21 of Schedule 10, s. 88(1)); 14 October 1991 (rest of the act); 1 February 1992: s. 5 (11 & 12); (Note: Section 108(2)–(3).)
Other legislation
Amends	Life Assurance Act 1774; Sexual Offences Act 1956; Administration of Justice Act 1964; Attachment of Earnings Act 1971; Domestic Proceedings and Magistrates' Courts Act 1978; Senior Courts Act 1981; County Courts Act 1984; Child Abduction Act 1984; Foster Children (Scotland) Act 1984; Surrogacy Arrangements Act 1985; Family Law Reform Act 1987
Repeals/revokes	Foster Children Act 1980
Amended by	Tribunals and Inquiries Act 1992; Probation Service Act 1993; Children (Scotland) Act 1995; Law Reform (Succession) Act 1995; Children (Northern Ireland) Order 1995; Family Law Act 1996; Education Act 1996; Justices of the Peace Act 1997; Crime and Disorder Act 1998; Powers of Criminal Courts (Sentencing) Act 2000; Care Standards Act 2000; Children (Leaving Care) Act 2000; Health and Social Care Act 2001; Adoption and Children Act 2002; Children Act 2004; Childcare Act 2006; National Health Service (Consequential Provisions) Act 2006; Safeguarding Vulnerable Groups Act 2006; Mental Health Act 2007; Criminal Justice and Immigration Act 2008; Statute Law (Repeals) Act 2008; Human Fertilisation and Embryology Act 2008; Children and Young Persons Act 2008; Health and Social Care Act 2012; Crime and Courts Act 2013; Children and Families Act 2014; Children Act 1989 (Amendment) (Female Genital Mutilation) Act 2019; Sentencing Act 2020; Health and Care Act 2022; Domestic Abuse Act 2021; Victims and Courts Act 2026

Status: Amended

Text of statute as originally enacted

Revised text of statute as amended

Text of the Children Act 1989 as in force today (including any amendments) within the United Kingdom, from legislation.gov.uk.

The Children Act 1989 (c. 41) is an act of the Parliament of the United Kingdom that received royal assent on 16 November 1989. It came into substantial force across all three jurisdictions of the United Kingdom on 14 October 1991. (Note: Paragraph 21 of Schedule 10 and section 88(1) (so far as it relates to Paragraph 21 of Schedule 10) came into force on 1st May 1991.) In September 1991, before commencement of the act in October 1991, the Commencement Order was amended so section 5(11) and (12) would not come into force until 1 February 1992. (Note: Children Act 1989 (Commencement No 2-Amendment and Transitional Provisions) Order 1991, Art 2) In 1995, for the purposes of devolution, the act was replaced by parallel legislation in Scotland and Northern Ireland. In 2016, Part III of the act was replaced in Wales.

The act is the most substantial reform of children's law of the 20th century.

The act gives duties to local authorities, courts, parents, and other agencies in the United Kingdom, to ensure children are safeguarded and their welfare is promoted. It centres on the idea that children are best cared for in their families, but it makes provision for alternative care arrangements and for instances when parents and families do not co-operate with statutory bodies.

== Passage ==
The Children Bill was announced as part of the Queen's Speech on 22 November 1988 and introduced to the House of Lords the following day by the Lord Chancellor, Lord Mackay of Clashfern. The Bill was given its second reading in the Lords on 6 December, and was passed to the committee stage on 13 December. Committee debates were held on 19 and 20 December and 23 January 1989. It reached the report stage on 2 February, with debates on 6, 7 and 16 February. On 16 March the Bill was given its third reading in the Lords before being passed to the House of Commons.

The Bill was given its second reading in the Commons on 27 April. It was granted Royal Assent on 16 November 1989 and became an Act.

== Contents ==
=== Part I: Introductory ===
==== Welfare of the child ====
The Children Act 1989 states that the court's primary concern is the child's welfare. It also specifies that any delays in the system processes will have a detrimental impact on a child's welfare. The court should take into account the child's wishes; physical, emotional and educational needs; age; sex; background circumstances; the likely effect of change on the child; the harm the child has suffered or is likely to suffer; parent's ability to meet the child's needs and the powers available to the court.

==== Parental responsibility ====
Parental responsibility is defined in the act as "all the rights, duties, powers, responsibilities and authority which by law a parent of a child has in relation to the child and his property". If the child's parents are married both have parental responsibility; if they are unmarried, the father does not automatically have parental responsibility however. A father of a child, who was not married to the mother at the time of birth may apply to the courts for parental responsibility, or this may be done through mutual agreement between the mother (or child) and father. The act specifies that more than one person can have parental responsibility, although they can act alone in decision making for the child.

If a child does not have anyone to care for them with parental responsibility a guardian can be appointed by the court. That appointment can be overturned on application of the parent with parental responsibility, by the child or in family proceedings.

==== Section 7 reports ====
Under Section 7 of the act, the court can request CAFCASS or local authorities to provide reports to the court in respect of the welfare of the child.

=== Part II: Orders with respect to children in family proceedings ===
==== Residence, contact, prohibited steps, and specific issue orders ====
Section 8 of the Children Act 1989 outlines the orders which can be issued by the court. A "contact order" (now termed a Child Arrangements Order) outlines the requirements, of the person the child resides with, to allow contact with another person. A "prohibited steps order" prevents a parent from exercising their full parental responsibility without consent of the court. A "residence order" (now termed a Child Arrangements Order) puts in place the arrangements for whom a child should live with. A "specific issue order" relates to directions given from the court to address a query that has arisen regarding parental responsibility for a child. Section 8 orders cannot be made in regards to children who are looked after; with the exception of the residence order. When an application is made to the court for a section 8 order the court takes into account: the nature of the proposed application; the connection the person has to the child; the disruption that could be caused to the child and, if the child is being looked after by the local authority: the local authorities plans for the child's future and the wishes of the child's parents. A person who gains a residence order for a child will hold parental responsibility for the time the order is in place. Despite this, the act forbids anyone to change the child's surname or remove them from the United Kingdom without permission from all those with parental responsibility or with express permission from the court. Under section 63(3) of the Magistrates' Courts Act 1980 the court has powers to punish those who do not abide by the ruling set out in the residence order.

Applications for section 8 orders are now regulated by the Child Arrangements Programme.

==== Family assistance orders ====
The court has the power to issue a family assistance order in which a probation officer or local authority officer should be available to "advise, assist and (where appropriate) befriend any person named in the order".

=== Part III: Local authority support for children and families ===
==== Children in need ====
Each local authority has a duty to "safeguard and promote the welfare" of children who are assessed as being in need. A child is deemed as "in need" if they are disabled or unlikely to achieve a reasonable standard of health or development unless services are provided. The local authority has a duty to provide or facilitate others to provide services for children in need. The local authority must provide day care for children in need who are under the age of five and not attending school if appropriate. There should also be provisions for out-of-school hours activities.

==== Accommodation and looking after children ====
Under section 20 of the act local authorities must provide accommodation for any child in need who has no-one with parental responsibility to care for them. This may also be extended to children that have a parent available if it is deemed that by staying with them it would put the child at risk. A child who is in the care of a local authority or provided with accommodation for more than 24 hours is referred to as a "looked after child".

A community home placement may be deemed necessary for persons between the ages of 16 and 18 to promote their welfare and safety.

The act specifies the need to give consideration to children's views when deciding where to accommodate them. Persons with parental responsibility should also be consulted, and if they object the child (unless they are over 16 years old) cannot be accommodated under Section 20 of this Act. The parent can also remove the child from the accommodation provided at any time.

Accommodation must also be provided when requested in the case of police protection orders or for children on remand or supervision orders that require them to be accommodated.

The local authority has a duty to safeguard and promote the welfare of the children in its care. The child, parents and other relevant people should be consulted in the decision-making process regarding a child being taken into care and during their time under local authority care. Consideration should also be given to the child's age, understanding, religion, race, culture and linguistic background.

Sibling groups should be placed together and should be accommodated near their home if possible.

Looked after children should not be placed in accommodation that restricts their liberty ("secure accommodation") unless they have a history or are likely to abscond and are at risk of suffering significant harm or are likely to cause harm to themselves or others. For a court to make a decision regarding placing a child in secure accommodation it must be satisfied that the child has legal representation or has been fully informed about how to access legal aid.

==== Children leaving care ====
Children leaving care should be given advice and assistance from the local authority; this may involve giving assistance in kind or in exceptional circumstances in cash. They may also contribute to the expenses incurred by the young person regarding employment, training or education.

==== Reviewing cases ====
Section 26 of the act outlines the obligation of the local authority to review cases regularly and they should have a complaints procedure available to the children they are caring for.

==== Multi-agency working ====
Local authorities also have a duty to communicate and share information with other agencies if it complies with their own statutory obligations. The local authority must consult with educational authorities when a child becomes looked after and ensure they are informed of the educational arrangements for the child.

==== Payment for services ====
A fee may apply to services provided under Sections 17 and 18 of the act ("other than advice, guidance or counselling") to the parents of the child, the young person if over the age of 16, or to a family member (if they receive the service). But the local authority should only charge them if it is reasonable to assume they can pay for the service.

=== Part IV: Care and supervision ===
==== Care and supervision orders ====
A care or supervision order may be granted by the court if a child is or is likely to suffer significant harm if they are not placed into local authority care. This also includes children who are "beyond parental control". The court may grant a care order in place of a supervision order if they believe it is more appropriate or vice versa. If, during family court the court has concerns for a child's welfare, they can direct the local authority to investigate. The local authority can then decide if they are going to apply for a care order or supervision order. If they decided not to take any legal action, they must explain to the court their reasons for doing so.

Applications for care and supervision orders are regulated by the Public Law Outline.

===== Care orders =====
When a care order is issued the local authority must take the child into care and accommodate them for the period of time the order is in force. The local authority will have parental responsibility for the child. Parents and guardians should be given reasonable amounts of contact with the child during the time they are in care unless otherwise directed by the court. However, in urgent situations to protect the child the local authority may refuse contact for up to seven days. Local authorities may apply to the court to prevent contact to safeguard or promote the child's welfare.

===== Supervision orders =====
A supervision order makes it the duty of the supervisor to "advise, assist and befriend" the child and to consider applying to the court for a variation on the order if it is not being fully complied with. An education supervision order may be granted if it is deemed that a child is not being properly educated. Before an application for an order is made, the education authority must consult with the "social service committee".

===== Interim orders =====
An interim order may be made if there are reasonable grounds to believe that the subject child has suffered, or is likely to suffer, significant harm. An interim care or supervision order is commonly drafted so as to last until the conclusion of the proceedings or further order. A care order, full or interim will confer parental responsibility ("PR") upon the applicant local authority. This does not extinguish the PR held previously by members of the child's family and thus their PR is shared with the local authority. A supervision order, interim or final, does not confer PR upon the local authority.

==== Guardians ====
A guardian shall be appointed by the court to safeguard the child's interests unless this is deemed not be required by the court. The court can also appoint a solicitor to represent the child. A guardian has access to and may take copies of any local authority records relating to the child concerned. The Guardian is under an obligation to represent and safeguard the interests of the child during the currency of the legal proceedings. A Guardian will invariably be represented by a solicitor. Older children may, if they disagree with the view of their Guardian, instruct their own solicitor to act on their behalf. Guardians have social work expertise but are independent of social services.

=== Part V: Protection of children ===
==== Child assessment orders ====
A child assessment order can be requested by the local authority if they believe it would not be possible to complete a proper assessment without an order. It must only be requested if the applicant has reason to believe that the child is likely to suffer significant harm or that an assessment is required to determine if the child is likely to suffer significant harm. The child should not be removed from home for the assessment to be completed; though the courts may deem this necessary for the period of assessment.

==== Emergency protection orders ====
An application can be made to the court for an emergency protection order (EPO) if it is believed a child is likely to suffer significant harm if they are not taken to, or remain in, a place of safety. The name and a description of the child should be provided to court upon application if possible. The order gives the local authority parental responsibility for the child though this should only be exercised as required to safeguard or promote the welfare of the child. As part of the order, the court can direct contact conditions and medical examinations of the child. The local authority has the power to return the child if it is assessed it is safe for the child to return home. It is an offence to obstruct someone who is carrying out the directions of the court in the case of an emergency protection order.

An emergency protection order lasts up to 8 days (unless the last day is a public holiday, and the court may direct that it is extended until noon on the next non-holiday day). This may be extended only once for a period up to 7 days. During this period the local authority may apply for a care order. The child, parent or care-giver may apply for the order to be discharged. An appeal cannot be made in relation to the making or refusal to make an emergency protection order.

An emergency protection order may also include an exclusion requirement which can stipulate that a person must leave or not enter the home of the child or must stay away from the area the child lives. This requirement can only be ordered if it is believed that the child will not suffer significant harm if this person no-longer lives at the property. The parent or care-giver who will remain at the home must agree to this requirement. If the child is removed from the home, the exclusion requirement ceases to be in effect.

In the circumstances in which a child's whereabouts cannot be established although it is believed a person knows where the child is, the court can order that this person provides the relevant authority with the information they hold. The court can also authorise entry into a property to search for a child; a police warrant may be issued to assist with gaining entry.

==== Police protection provisions ====
If there are concerns of a child suffering significant harm the police have the power to ensure that child is removed to, or remains in, a place of safety for up to 72 hours. They do not require a court order, but they must ensure that the local authority is informed and the child is accommodated appropriately.

==== Section 47 investigations ====
A local authority must investigate if they are informed that a child in their area is subject of an emergency protection order, is in police protection or is suffering or likely to be suffering significant harm. They must then take any steps, as reasonably practicable, to ensure that the child is safeguarded. If any concerns arise regarding a child's education, the relevant local education authority should be consulted. If as part of the enquiries they are unable to gain access to the child, and they still have significant concerns, the local authority can apply for an emergency protection order, a child assessment order, a care order or a supervision order. If it is deemed an order is not required they may establish a date to review the case.

==== Abduction of children in care ====
A person is committing an offence if they knowingly take a child, who is in care, away from the responsible person as ordered by the court. It is also an offence to encourage or assist a child to run away from the responsible person; this can be punishable by imprisonment up to 6 months or a fine. A recovery order can be made by the court to retrieve a child who is believed to have been abducted.

=== Part VI: Community homes ===
All local authorities must ensure that they have community homes available to use for children who are looked after. This may be a home which is controlled by the local authority or a voluntary organisation working on behalf of local authority. A community home would cease to be used by the local authority if it was deemed unsatisfactory by the Secretary of State. If a controlled or assisted community home wishes to discontinue offering a service to local authorities they must give two years' notice to the Secretary of State and the local authority. If a local authority wishes to cease using a voluntary owned community home, they must also give 2 years' notice in writing.
