= Children Act 1958 =

Act of the Parliament of the United Kingdom

Children Act 1958 (Note: Section 41(1).)
- Act of Parliament
- Parliament of the United Kingdom
- Long title: An Act to make fresh provision for the protection of children living away from their parents; to amend the law relating to the adoption of children; and for purposes connected with the matters aforesaid.
- Citation: 6 & 7 Eliz. 2. c. 65
- Territorial extent: England and Wales; Scotland; (Note: Section 41(4).)

Dates
- Royal assent: 1 August 1958
- Commencement: 1 April 1959 (Note: Section 41(3).)
- Repealed: England and Wales: 1 April 1981; Scotland: 31 January 1985
Other legislation
Amends	See § Repealed enactments
Repeals/revokes	See § Repealed enactments
Amended by	Statute Law (Repeals) Act 1969; Child Care Act 1980
Repealed by	England and Wales: Foster Children Act 1980; Scotland: Foster Children (Scotland) Act 1984
Relates to	Adoption Act 1958

Status: Repealed

Text of statute as originally enacted

The Children Act 1958 (6 & 7 Eliz. 2. c. 65) was an act of the Parliament of the United Kingdom that made fresh provision for the protection of children living away from their parents in Great Britain, and amended the law relating to the adoption of children.

== Provisions ==
=== Repealed enactments ===
Section 40(2) of the act repealed 10 enactments, listed in the third schedule to the act.

Enactments repealed by section 40(2)
Citation	Short title	Extent of repeal
8 Edw. 7. c. 67	Children Act 1908	The whole act.
16 & 17 Geo. 5. c. 29	Adoption of Children Act 1926	Section ten.
20 & 21 Geo. 5. c. 37	Adoption of Children (Scotland) Act 1930	Section ten.
26 Geo. 5 & 1 Edw. 8. c. 49	Public Health Act 1936	Sections two hundred and six to two hundred and twenty.
26 Geo. 5 & 1 Edw. 8. c. 50	Public Health (London) Act 1936	Part XIII.
1 Edw. 8 & 1 Geo. 6. c. 37	Children and Young Persons (Scotland) Act 1937	Part I.
11 & 12 Geo. 6. c. 43	Children Act 1948	Part V. In section forty-two, subsection (2). In section fifty-five, in subsection (1), the words from "or the provisions" to the end of the subsection. In the Second Schedule, paragraph 10. In the Third Schedule, the entries relating to the Public Health Act 1936, and to the Public Health (London) Act 1936, and the first three entries relating to the Children and Young Persons (Scotland) Act 1937.
11 & 12 Geo. 6. c. 53	Nurseries and Child-Minders Regulation Act 1948	In section nine, in subsection (2), the words "of those children or any other".
12, 13 & 14 Geo. 6. c. 98	Adoption of Children Act 1949	In section thirteen, in subsection (2), the words from "section two hundred and twenty" to "The Public Health (London) Act 1936" and the words from "and for the definition" to the end of the subsection.
14 Geo. 6. c. 26	Adoption Act 1950	In section two, subsection (1), and in subsection (4), the words "or body" and the words from "or who is liable" to "maintenance of the infant". In section three, in subsection (1), paragraph (b). In section eight, in subsection (4), the words "or body". In section twelve, in subsection (2), the words "but shall cease to have effect if she subsequently marries". In section fourteen, subsection (2) except so far as it relates to a will or codicil confirmed by codicil executed before the commencement of this Act. In section eighteen, in subsection (2), paragraph (b); and in subsection (5) the words from "both in regard" to the end of the subsection. In section twenty, in subsection (6), the words from "both in regard" to the end of the subsection. In section twenty-one, subsection (2). In section twenty-seven, in subsection (1), in paragraph (a), the words "resident in Great Britain" and the words from "whether" to "otherwise"; paragraph (b); and subsections (2) to (4). Sections twenty-eight to thirty-seven, thirty-nine and forty. In section forty-three, in subsection (1), the words "in connection with their functions under any enactment relating to children". In section forty-five, in subsection (1), the definitions of "abroad", "child protection visitor", "custodian" and "welfare authority"; and in subsection (2) the words "not being a parent or guardian of the infant". In the Fifth Schedule, paragraphs 3, 8, 9 and 10.

== Subsequent developments ==
The whole act, so far as unrepealed, was repealed for England and Wales by section 23(3) of, and the third schedule to, the Foster Children Act 1980, which came into force on 1 April 1981.

The whole act was repealed for Scotland by section 22(3) of, and the third schedule to, the Foster Children (Scotland) Act 1984, which came into force on 31 January 1985.
