= Penal labour in the United Kingdom =

Penal labour in the United Kingdom exists as part of a framework of rehabilitation.

Across all jurisdictions of the United Kingdom, imprisonment with "hard labour" ended through legislation passed in the late 1940s and 1950s, but in general penal labour remains.

Prisons have historically used Incentive and Enhanced Privilege systems, known as IEPs, to encourage prisoners to behave well, and participate in mandatory labour and education, by assigning each prisoner a designation of "standard", "basic" or "enhanced". Since 2019, the UK Ministry of Justice has updated this to a policy of Incentives Policy Framework, with the main difference being that governors are explicitly encouraged to set wages to be differentiated between different statuses - where in the past this practice was explicitly criticised by different inspectorates, because it creates inequalities between different wages for prisoners doing the same work - and are explicitly encouraged to create statuses even higher than "enhanced".

== History ==
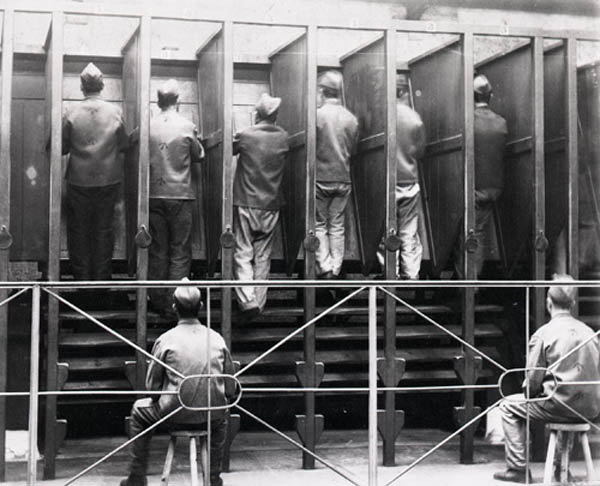
Prisoners at the treadmill in Pentonville Prison, London, 1895

Imprisonment with hard labour was first introduced into English law with the Criminal Law Act 1776 (16 Geo. 3. c. 43), also known as the "Hulks Act", which authorised prisoners being put to work on improving the navigation of the River Thames in lieu of transportation to the North American colonies, which had become impossible due to the American War of Independence.

The Penal Servitude Act 1853 (16 & 17 Vict. c. 99), substituted penal servitude for transportation to a distant British colony, except in cases where a person could be sentenced to transportation for life or for a term not less than fourteen years. Section 2 of the Penal Servitude Act 1857 (20 & 21 Vict. c. 3) abolished the sentence of transportation in all cases and provided that in all cases a person who would otherwise have been liable to transportation would be liable to penal servitude instead. Section 1 of the Penal Servitude Act 1891 makes provision for enactments which authorise a sentence of penal servitude but do not specify a maximum duration. It must now be read subject to section 1(1) of the Criminal Justice Act 1948.

Sentences of penal servitude were served in convict prisons and were controlled by the Home Office and the Prison Commissioners. After sentencing, convicts would be classified according to the seriousness of the offence of which they were convicted and their criminal record. First time offenders would be classified in the Star class; persons not suitable for the Star class, but without serious convictions would be classified in the intermediate class. Habitual offenders would be classified in the Recidivist class. Care was taken to ensure that convicts in one class did not mix with convicts in another.

Penal servitude included hard labour as a standard feature. Although it was prescribed for severe crimes (e.g. rape, attempted murder, wounding with intent, by the Offences against the Person Act 1861) it was also widely applied in cases of minor crime, such as petty theft and vagrancy, as well as victimless behaviour deemed harmful to the fabric of society. Notable recipients of hard labour under British law include the prolific writer Oscar Wilde (after his conviction for gross indecency), imprisoned in Reading Gaol.

Labour was sometimes useful. In Inveraray Jail from 1839 prisoners worked up to ten hours a day. Most male prisoners made herring nets or picked oakum (Inveraray was a busy herring port); those with skills were often employed where their skills could be used, such as shoemaking, tailoring or joinery. Female prisoners picked oakum, knitted stockings or sewed. Semi-punitive labour also included oakum-picking: teasing apart old tarry rope to make caulking material for sailing vessels.

Forms of labour for punishment included the treadmill, shot drill, and the crank machine.

Treadmills for punishment were used for decades in British prisons beginning in 1818; they often took the form of large paddle wheels some 20 feet in diameter with 24 steps around a six-foot cylinder. Prisoners had to work six or more hours a day, climbing the equivalent of 5,000 to 14,000 vertical feet. While the purpose was mainly punitive, the mills could have been used to grind grain, pump water, or operate a ventilation system.

Shot drill involved stooping without bending the knees, lifting a heavy cannonball slowly to chest height, taking three steps to the right, replacing it on the ground, stepping back three paces, and repeating, moving cannonballs from one pile to another.

=== Colonies ===
==== Australia ====
The crank machine was a device which turned a crank by hand which in turn forced four large cups or ladles through sand inside a drum, doing nothing useful. Male prisoners had to turn the handle 6,000–14,400 times over the period of six hours a day (1.5–3.6 seconds per turn), as registered on a dial. The warder could make the task harder by tightening an adjusting screw.

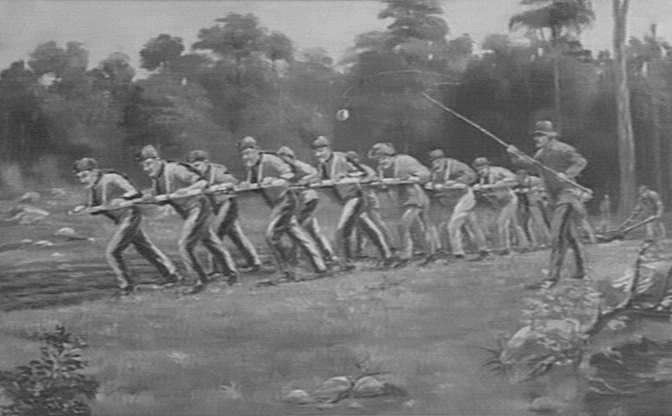
Convict labourers in Australia in the early 20th century

The British penal colonies in Australia between 1788 and 1868 provide a major historical example of convict labour, as described above: during that period, Australia received thousands of transported convict labourers, many of whom had received harsh sentences for minor misdemeanours in Britain or Ireland.

As late as 1885, 75% of all prison inmates were involved in some sort of productive endeavour, mostly in private contract and leasing systems. By 1935, the portion of prisoners working had fallen to 44%, and almost 90% of those worked in state-run programmes rather than for private contractors.

=== England and Wales ===
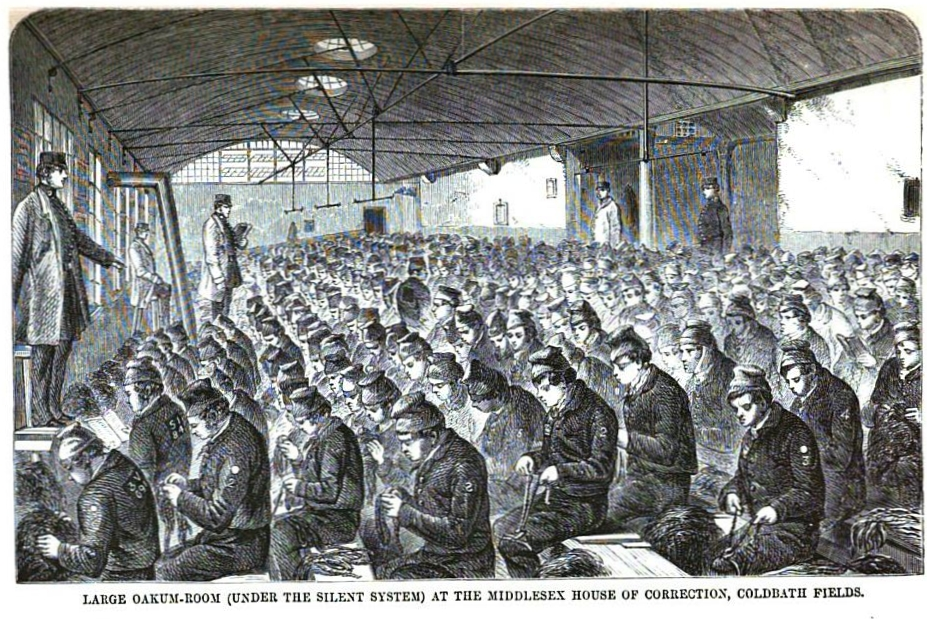
Prisoners picking oakum at Coldbath Fields Prison in London, circa 1864

Penal servitude was abolished for England and Wales by section 1(1) of the Criminal Justice Act 1948. Every enactment conferring power on a court to pass a sentence of penal servitude in any case must be construed as conferring power to pass a sentence of imprisonment for a term not exceeding the maximum term of penal servitude for which a sentence could have been passed in that case immediately before the commencement of that Act.

Imprisonment with hard labour was abolished by section 1(2) of that Act.

=== Scotland ===
Penal servitude was abolished in Scotland by section 16(1) of the Criminal Justice (Scotland) Act 1949 on 12 June 1950, and imprisonment with hard labour was abolished by section 16(2) of the act.

Every enactment conferring power on a court to pass a sentence of penal servitude in any case must be construed as conferring power to pass a sentence of imprisonment for a term not exceeding the maximum term of penal servitude for which a sentence could have been passed in that case immediately before 12 June 1950. But this does not empower any court, other than the High Court, to pass a sentence of imprisonment for a term exceeding three years.

=== Northern Ireland ===
Penal servitude was abolished for Northern Ireland by section 1(1) of the Criminal Justice Act (Northern Ireland) 1953. Every enactment which operated to empower a court to pass a sentence of penal servitude in any case now operates so as to empower that court to pass a sentence of imprisonment for a term not exceeding the maximum term of penal servitude for which a sentence could have been passed in that case immediately before the commencement of that Act.

Imprisonment with hard labour was abolished by section 1(2) of that Act.

== Modern prison labour systems ==
According to section 45(1) of the National Minimum Wage Act 1998, prisoners are excluded from the national minimum wage. According to §2.7.2 of Prison Service Order 4460 when prisoners are released on temporary facility licence to undertake work for outside employers, they will not qualify for the national minimum wage.

According to section 2(1) of the Prisoners' Earnings Act 1996, the government is entitled to apply deductions and levies on the earnings of prisoners in respect of work carried by the prisoner during his period of detention.

Likewise, asylum seekers were in 2014, being paid at most £1.25. In 2023, asylum seekers were still being paid £1 per hour, and by this point no prisoners were on the wage for "special projects" of up to £1.25 per hour.

=== England and Wales ===
The independent monitoring for HMP Belmarsh has continued to question the efficacy of the work "opportunities" provided there.

According to the independent monitoring board for HMP Thameside and the independent monitoring board for HMP Dovegate, the job opportunities that are available are of low quality.

According to the independent monitoring board for HMP Leeds, "much of the work is repetitive" and is restricted due to the "Victorian facilities" in an interview regarding the UK government's management of the prison service of England and Wales.

Rachel Halford, director of the Women in Prison think tank has said that women in prison are underpaid and this "reinforces the belief they are worthless".

=== Scotland ===
HM Inspectorate for Prisons in Scotland (HMIPS) has noted that there were issues around prisoners missing wages leading to a breakdown between hall staff and the Activities Team.

=== Northern Ireland ===
According to the Criminal Justice Inspection of Northern Ireland report, the application of the progressive regimes and earned privileges scheme (PREPs) in Maghaberry Prison was predominantly "punishment orientated". According to the Criminal Justice Inspection of Northern Ireland report Hydebank Wood Young Offender Centre differentiated a prisoner's wages based on certain whether a prisoner was based on PREPS status

=== Crown dependencies ===
==== Jersey ====
In 2019, there were 6 cases of prisoners intentionally failed to "work properly" and were thus punished by a loss of privileges.

==== Guernsey ====
The States of Guernsey's website explicitly implies that the system of privileges is designed to encourage prisoners to participate in "mandatory" employment, implying some privileges would be restricted if a prisoner refuses to participate.

==== Isle of Man ====
Access to enhanced privileges, requires having a high enough "work ethic".
