= Penal Servitude Act 1864 =

Act of the Parliament of the United Kingdom

Penal Servitude Act 1864 (Note: Section 1 of the act provides that it may be cited as the Penal Servitude Act of the year in which it was passed.)
- Act of Parliament
- Parliament of the United Kingdom
- Long title: An Act to amend the Penal Servitude Acts.
- Citation: 27 & 28 Vict. c. 47
- Territorial extent: United Kingdom

Dates
- Royal assent: 25 July 1864
- Commencement: 25 July 1864 (Note: Section 2.)
- Repealed: England and Wales: 18 April 1949 (Note: The Criminal Justice Act 1948 (Date of Commencement) Order 1949.)
Other legislation
Amends	Penal Servitude Act 1853; Penal Servitude Act 1857
Amended by	Statute Law Revision Act 1875; Penal Servitude Act 1891
Repealed by	England and Wales: Criminal Justice Act 1948; Criminal Justice (Scotland) Act 1949

Status: Repealed

Text of statute as originally enacted

The Penal Servitude Act 1864 (27 & 28 Vict. c. 47) was an act of the Parliament of the United Kingdom. The act amended the Penal Servitude Act 1853 (16 & 17 Vict. c. 99) and the Penal Servitude Act 1857 (20 & 21 Vict. c. 3). The act received royal assent on 25 July 1864.

== Passage ==
The act had its second reading on 4 March 1864 and gained royal assent on 25 July 1864.

== Provisions ==
The provisions of the act include:

- Amending the former acts to make the minimum sentence of penal servitude five years instead of three.
  - If one had already committed a felony, this was lengthened to seven years minimum sentence.
- Gave the Secretary of State the power to order two or more justices of the peace to sentence offenders serving penal sentences to corporal punishment for offences they commit while in prison.
- Allowed convicts to be freed by the issuing of a license. Such licenses were forfeited if the convict was found guilty of another offence within the time period of their original sentence.
- Making it an offence to not produce a license when asked by a judge, justice of the peace, sheriff, sheriff-substitute or magistrate or to break the terms of the license which by itself would not be a crime.
  - Making the sentence for such offences three months imprisonment, with or without hard labour.
- Allowing a police officer to arrest without warrant any license holder who may be reasonably be suspected of committing a crime or of violating the terms of their License and detain them until they can be put before a magistrate and "dealt with according to the law.
- Allowing two or more justices in England or Ireland to rule on offences in this act, in manners directed in Summary Jurisdiction Act 1848 (11 & 12 Vict. c. 43) and Petty Sessions (Ireland) Act 1851 (14 & 15 Vict. c. 93), respectively.
- Allowing any sheriff, sheriff-substitute, magistrate or any two justices in Scotland to rule on offences in this act.
- Making it the responsibility of whoever convicts the prisoner to notify the Secretary of State if the conviction is in England or Scotland or the Lord Lieutenant in Ireland.
- Making prisoners whose licenses have been revoked carry out the remainder of the term exempted by the license while serving any other sentence they might be subject to.
- Gave the Crown, the Lord Lieutenant of Ireland and the Governor of Ireland the powers to give and revoke licenses with amended terms "at pleasure".

== Subsequent developments ==
Sections 2 and 6 of the act (giving corporal punishments and arrest without warrant) were repealed by the Penal Servitude Act 1891 (54 & 55 Vict. c. 69).

The whole act was repealed for England and Wales by section 83(3) of, and part I of the tenth schedule to, the Criminal Justice Act 1948 (11 & 12 Geo. 6. c. 58), which came into force on 18 April 1949.

The whole act was repealed for Scotland by section 79(3) of, and the twelfth schedule to, the Criminal Justice (Scotland) Act 1949 (12, 13 & 14 Geo. 6. c. 94), which came into force on.
