= Criminal Justice Act 1948 =

Act of the Parliament of the United Kingdom

Criminal Justice Act 1948 (Note: Section 83(1).)
- Act of Parliament
- Parliament of the United Kingdom
- Long title: An Act to abolish penal servitude, hard labour, prison divisions and sentence of whipping; to amend the law-relating to the probation of offenders, and otherwise to reform existing methods and provide new methods of dealing with offenders and persons liable to imprisonment; to amend the law relating to the proceedings of criminal courts, including the law relating to evidence before such courts; to abolish privilege of peerage in criminal proceedings; to regulate the management of prisons and other institutions and the treatment of offenders and other persons committed to custody; to re-enact certain enactments relating to the matters aforesaid; and for purposes connected therewith.
- Citation: 11 & 12 Geo. 6. c. 58
- Introduced by: Attlee ministry
- Territorial extent: England and Wales (Note: This is the effect of sections 81 and 82 and the presumption that an act extends to the United Kingdom unless the contrary is specified. Some of the provisions formerly extended to those countries.)

Dates
- Royal assent: 30 July 1948
- Commencement: 13 September 1948: in part (Note: The Criminal Justice Act 1948 (Date of Commencement) Order 1948 and the Criminal Justice Act 1948 (Date of Commencement) (No. 2) Order 1948.); 27 December 1948: in part (Note: The Criminal Justice Act 1948 (Date of Commencement) (No. 3) Order 1948.); 14 March 1949: in part (Note: The Criminal Justice Act 1948 (Date of Commencement) (No. 2) Order 1949.); 1 April 1949: in part (Note: The Criminal Justice Act 1948 (Date of Commencement) Order 1949.); 18 April 1949: in part (Note: The Criminal Justice Act 1948 (Date of Commencement) (No. 3) Order 1948 and the Criminal Justice Act 1948 (Date of Commencement) Order 1949.); 1 August 1949: in part (Note: The Criminal Justice Act 1948 (Date of Commencement) (No. 3) Order 1949.)
- Repealed: Scotland and Northern Ireland: 16 June 1977
Other legislation
Amends	Act of Supremacy (Ireland) 1560; Servants' Characters Act 1792; Official Secrets Act 1920; Criminal Justice Act 1925; Government Annuities Act 1929
Repeals/revokes	Pentonville Prison Act 1842; Grand Juries Act 1856
Amended by	Criminal Justice (Scotland) Act 1949; Justices of the Peace Act 1949; Criminal Cases Act 1952; Children and Young Persons (Amendment) Act 1952; Prison Act 1952; Magistrates' Courts Act 1952; Costs in Criminal Cases Act 1952; Statute Law Revision Act 1953; Homicide Act 1957; Mental Health Act 1959; Road Traffic Act 1960; Administration of Justice Act 1960; Criminal Justice Act 1961; Children and Young Persons Act 1963; Criminal Law Act 1967; Criminal Appeal Act 1968; Firearms Act 1968; Theft Act 1968; Justices of the Peace Act 1968; Courts Act 1971; Criminal Justice Act 1972; Powers of Criminal Courts Act 1973; Juries Act 1974; Police Pensions Act 1976; Bail Act 1976; Statute Law (Repeals) Act 1977; Senior Courts Act 1981; Dangerous Dogs Act 1989; Criminal Justice and Police Act 2001; Armed Forces Act 2006; Statute Law (Repeals) Act 2008
Repealed by	Scotland and Northern Ireland: Statute Law (Repeals) Act 1977
Relates to	Criminal Justice (Scotland) Act 1949

Status: Partially repealed

Text of statute as originally enacted

Text of the Criminal Justice Act 1948 as in force today (including any amendments) within the United Kingdom, from legislation.gov.uk.

The Criminal Justice Act 1948 (11 & 12 Geo. 6. c. 58) is an act of the Parliament of the United Kingdom that implemented several widespread reforms of the English criminal justice system, mainly abolishing penal servitude, corporal punishment, and the right of peers to be tried for treason and felony in the House of Lords. The act also dealt with more minor aspects of criminal law, such as the procedure regarding bail. Early versions of the bill attempted to abolish the death penalty, but this would not occur until 1965.

Reforming the criminal justice system by removing penal servitude and whipping had long been a goal of Labour, and the Attlee government was felt capable of bringing those reforms into effect. Peers in the House of Lords, who considered being tried by the House to be a bothersome duty rather than a privilege, added a provision abolishing peer trials by peers, which was accepted by both houses.

The Criminal Justice (Scotland) Act 1949 (12, 13 & 14 Geo. 6. c. 94) made equivalent provisions for Scotland.

As of 2025, the act remains partially in force in England and Wales.

== Background ==
=== Penal servitude ===
From at least the 17th century, the Kingdom of England and its successor states maintained the penalty of transportation to English colonies for felons. Originally these colonies were in North America, and after the loss of most such colonies transportation moved to Australia. Non-felon settlers in Australia began to resent the transportation of felons to their lands, however, so the practice was abolished in 1852. In its stead arose a system of penal servitude; while such servitude could be and sometimes was for a productive purpose, more often than not it was meaningless labour intended to be physically exhausting, such as the penal treadmill.

By the mid-1930s, most servitude was of the latter type, being in public prisons.

=== Corporal and capital punishment ===
Both corporal punishment and capital punishment had long been staples in British criminal law; death was the mandatory sentence for many offences since time immemorial, as was whipping.

=== Trial of peers by peers ===
Mediaeval courts were limited in their scope; lords generally held their own courts, which had jurisdiction over the lord's subjects. The king's main advisors, who would in time evolve into the peerage, were subjects directly to the King and so could only be tried by royal courts. Eager to limit royal authority wherever possible, mediaeval barons asserted for themselves the right to be tried only by fellow barons rather than the usual royal courts. A statutory authorisation of this right that would have granted peers the option, but not requirement, to be tried by peers was passed in 1391 but quickly repealed under royal pressure. (Note: Soon after granting royal assent to the bill, Richard II revoked it after Parliament displeased him; insisting that Parliament alone could repeal laws, Parliament quickly did so under Richard's will.) The 1391 repeal, combined with the practical inability of peers to secure the right to try peers for any and every offence, ended up forming a settlement that peers were required to be tried in the House of Lords for treason and felony, and could not waive such a trial in favour of a trial by jury. Technically speaking, the House of Lords tried such trials only when Parliament was in session, and the Court of the Lord High Steward tried them at other times. This latter court comprised those lords, known as "Lords Triers", whom the monarch empowered for the purpose. (Note: Technically speaking, the Lord High Steward could be a commoner, in which event he would merely preside over the proceedings and be unable to speak or deliberate; the position – filled in latter centuries only during coronations and trials of peers – was in practice held always by a peer, and for trials usually by the Lord Chancellor.) Monarchs could and did empower peers favourable to their desired verdict to the court, but this ended when Parliament passed the Treason Act 1695 (7 & 8 Will. 3. c. 3) requiring that all peers be summoned to the court, rendering the two courts virtually indistinguishable.

In practice, this trial was far more a detriment than a privilege for accused peers. Whereas a commoner could challenge certain individuals from being empanelled in his or her jury, peers had no such right since all lords were involved in the deliberations and verdict (Note: Lords Spiritual participated in the deliberations but walked out before a verdict was voted on, a custom that dated from mediaeval concerns of ecclesiastical judges participating in lay courts, especially when a possible death sentence was involved.) of the court. Furthermore, whilst a commoner could appeal a decision to higher courts, the House of Lords was the highest court in the land so no appeal was possible for a convicted peer except for royal pardon. Nor were there any substantial benefits in terms of sentencing compared to a commoner convicted of the same offence; the privilege of a peer to be excused for the first offence he committed other than murder or treason was abolished in 1841, and the vote of the Lords to determine the punishment of the convicted was constrained by law. In addition, the actual proceedings of such trials were almost invariably controlled by the advice of royal justices, the same people who tried commoners; as early as the 18th century, the Lord High Steward asked a justice for advice on all but one of his motions and decisions.

The persistence of these trials was in large part because so few of them occurred in latter centuries; only one in the 19th century, and only two in the 20th; of Earl Russell for bigamy in 1901, and the last in 1935, when Lord de Clifford, both distant relatives, was charged with vehicular manslaughter. By the mid-1930s, the majority opinion of the Lords was that the privilege ought to be abolished; the holders of this view were generally holders of recently-created peerages who chafed at the burden imposed on them, whereas the minority who defended the practice were generally holders of older peerages who considered it a privilege of the House as a whole.

In 1936, the former Lord Chancellor Viscount Sankey proposed, and the House voted, to abolish the privilege, but the government did not give time for the motion to be considered by the Commons before the session ended. A similar vote was passed in the Lords in 1937 but likewise died in the Commons.

== Legislative history ==
The act is "one of the most important measures relating to the reform of the criminal law and its administration".

Other substantive provisions still in force are:

- s. 27, as amended by (in particular) the Children and Young Persons Act 1969 (c. 54), which provides for remand of defendants between 18 and 20 years old to remand centres, and s. 49, which regulates them;
- s. 31(1), which gives English courts extraterritorial jurisdiction in respect of Crown servants committing indictable offences abroad while in the course of their duties;
- s. 37, relating to bail on appeal;
- s. 41, which makes certain kinds of evidence admissible via a signed certificate instead of oral submissions;
- s 42, on a procedural rule in cases on indictment;
- s. 66, partly defining "custody";
- s. 70(2), authorising pensions to be paid notwithstanding disqualification from office under section 2 of the Forfeiture Act 1870 (33 & 34 Vict. c. 23) due to conviction for a crime.

=== Commencement ===
Criminal Justice Act 1948 (Date of Commencement) Order 1948 (Note: Section 2.)
- Statutory Instrument
- Parliament of the United Kingdom
- Citation: SI 1948/1840
- Introduced by: Ted Leadbitter (Commons)
- Territorial extent: United Kingdom

Dates
- Made: 5 August 1948
- Commencement: 13 September 1948 (Note: Section 1.)
Other legislation
Made under	Criminal Justice Act 1948

Status: Current legislation

Text of statute as originally enacted

Criminal Justice Act 1948 (Date of Commencement) (No. 2) Order 1948 (Note: Section 2.)
- Statutory Instrument
- Parliament of the United Kingdom
- Citation: SI 1948/2056
- Introduced by: Ted Leadbitter (Commons)
- Territorial extent: United Kingdom

Dates
- Made: 13 September 1948
- Commencement: 13 September 1948 (Note: Section 1.)
Other legislation
Made under	Criminal Justice Act 1948

Status: Current legislation

Text of statute as originally enacted

Criminal Justice Act 1948 (Date of Commencement) (No. 3) Order 1948 (Note: Section 3.)
- Statutory Instrument
- Parliament of the United Kingdom
- Citation: SI 1948/2349
- Introduced by: Ted Leadbitter (Commons)
- Territorial extent: United Kingdom

Dates
- Made: 25 October 1948
- Commencement: 27 December 1948 (Note: Section 1.); 18 April 1949 (Note: Section 2.)
Other legislation
Made under	Criminal Justice Act 1948

Status: Current legislation

Text of statute as originally enacted

Criminal Justice Act 1948 (Date of Commencement) Order 1949 (Note: Section 3.)
- Statutory Instrument
- Parliament of the United Kingdom
- Citation: SI 1949/139
- Introduced by: Edward Ford (Commons)
- Territorial extent: United Kingdom

Dates
- Made: 28 January 1949
- Commencement: 1 April 1949 (Note: Section 1.); 18 April 1949 (Note: Section 2.)
Other legislation
Made under	Criminal Justice Act 1948

Status: Current legislation

Text of statute as originally enacted

Criminal Justice Act 1948 (Date of Commencement) (No. 2) Order 1949 (Note: Section 2.)
- Statutory Instrument
- Parliament of the United Kingdom
- Citation: SI 1949/372
- Introduced by: Ted Leadbitter (Commons)
- Territorial extent: United Kingdom

Dates
- Made: 4 March 1949
- Commencement: 14 March 1949 (Note: Section 1.)
Other legislation
Made under	Criminal Justice Act 1948

Status: Current legislation

Text of statute as originally enacted

Criminal Justice Act 1948 (Date of Commencement) (No. 3) Order 1949 (Note: Section 2.)
- Statutory Instrument
- Parliament of the United Kingdom
- Citation: SI 1949/1045
- Introduced by: Ted Leadbitter (Commons)
- Territorial extent: United Kingdom

Dates
- Made: 31 May 1949
- Commencement: 1 August 1949 (Note: Section 1.)
Other legislation
Made under	Criminal Justice Act 1948

Status: Current legislation

Text of statute as originally enacted

The Criminal Justice Act 1948 (Date of Commencement) Order 1948 (SI 1948/1840) provided that sections 2, 16, 30, 31, 32, 33, 38, 42, 44, 50, 55, 55, 67, 71, 77(1), 79 (and the ninth schedule) in part, 80, 81 in part, 82 in part and 83(3) in part, would come into force on 13 September 1948.

The Criminal Justice Act 1948 (Date of Commencement) (No. 2) Order 1948 (SI 1948/2056) provided that certain provisions of the act would come into force on 13 September 1948.

The Criminal Justice Act 1948 (Date of Commencement) (No. 3) Order 1948 (SI 1948/2349) provided that certain provisions of the act would come into force on 27 December 1948 and 18 April 1949.

The Criminal Justice Act 1948 (Date of Commencement) Order 1949 (SI 1949/139) provided that certain provisions of the act would come into force on 1 April 1949 and 18 April 1949.

The Criminal Justice Act 1948 (Date of Commencement) (No. 2) Order 1949 (SI 1949/372) provided that certain provisions of the act would come into force on 1 April 1949.

The Criminal Justice Act 1948 (Date of Commencement) (No. 3) Order 1949 (SI 1949/372) provided that sections 3, 4, 5 (and the fifth schedule), 6, 7, 8, 9, 10, 11 and 12 of the act would come into force on 1 August 1949.

Section 83(2) of the act provided that the act would come into force on a day or days appointed by the King by order in council.

=== Territorial extent ===
Except for the parts abolishing the privilege of peerage, the act applied only to England and Wales. Some of its content is mirrored in the Criminal Justice (Scotland) Act 1949 (12, 13 & 14 Geo. 6. c. 94) and the Criminal Justice Act (Northern Ireland) 1953 (c. 14 (N.I.)).

=== Repealed enactments ===
Section 83(3) of the act repealed 100 enactments, listed in parts I, II and III of the tenth schedule to the act, for England and Wales, Scotland and Northern Ireland, respectively.

Part I - relating to England and Wales only
Citation	Short title	Description	Extent of repeal.
11 Will. 3. c. 12	Governors of Plantations Act 1698	An Act to Punish Governors of Plantations in this Kingdom for Crimes by them committed in the Plantations.	The words "in his Majesties Court of Kings Bench" and the words from "or before such commissioners" to "same county".
42 Geo. 3. c. 85	Criminal Jurisdiction Act 1802	The Criminal Jurisdiction Act, 1802.	In section one, the words "in his Majesty's Court of King's Bench"; the words from "found, in which information" to "Middlesex"; and the words "at the discretion of his Majesty's Court of King's Bench".
3 Geo. 4. c. 114	Hard Labour Act 1822	The Hard Labour Act, 1822.	The whole act.
5 Geo. 4. c. 83	Vagrancy Act 1824	The Vagrancy Act, 1824.	In section five, the words from "and every such offender" to the end. In section ten, the words from "and to order further" to the end.
5 Geo. 4. c. 84	Transportation Act 1824	The Transportation Act, 1824.	The whole act.
6 Geo. 4. c. 50	Juries Act 1825	The Juries Act, 1825.	In section twenty-nine, the words from "and no person" to the end.
7 & 8 Geo. 4. c. 28	Criminal Law Act 1827	The Criminal Law Act, 1827.	In section ten, the words from "and where" to the end.
11 Geo. 4 & 1 Will. 4. c. 39	Transportation Act 1830	The Transportation Act, 1830.	The whole act.
11 Geo. 4 & 1 Will. 4. c. 70	Law Terms Act 1830	The Law Terms Act, 1830.	Section thirty-three.
3 & 4 Will. 4. c. 99	Fines Act 1833	The Fines Act, 1833.	Section twenty-nine.
4 & 5 Will. 4. c. 67	Transportation Act 1834	The Transportation Act, 1834.	The whole act.
1 & 2 Vict. c. 82	Parkhurst Prison Act 1838	The Parkhurst Prison Act, 1838.	The whole act.
2 & 3 Vict. c. 56	Prisons Act 1839	The Prisons Act, 1839.	The whole act.
3 & 4 Vict. c. 61	Beerhouse Act 1840	The Beerhouse Act, 1840.	In section seven, the words "of felony or".
5 & 6 Vict. c. 29	Pentonville Prison Act 1842	The Pentonville Prison Act, 1842.	The whole act.
5 & 6 Vict. c. 61	South Australia Act 1842	The South Australia Act, 1842.	The whole act.
5 & 6 Vict. c. 98	Prison Act 1842	The Prison Act, 1842.	Section twelve.
6 & 7 Vict. c. 7	Transportation Act 1843	The Transportation Act, 1843.	The whole act.
10 & 11 Vict. c. 67	Transportation Act 1847	The Transportation Act, 1847.	The whole act.
11 & 12 Vict. c. 43	Summary Jurisdiction Act 1848	The Summary Jurisdiction Act, 1848.	In section twenty-one, the words "or to imprison him and keep him to hard labour".
13 & 14 Vict. c. 39	Convict Prisons Act 1850	The Convict Prisons Act, 1850.	The whole act.
14 & 15 Vict. c. 100	Criminal Procedure Act 1851	The Criminal Procedure Act, 1851.	Section twenty-nine.
16 & 17 Vict. c. 99	Penal Servitude Act 1853	The Penal Servitude Act, 1853.	The whole act.
16 & 17 Vict. c. 121	Convict Prisons Act 1853	The Convict Prisons Act, 1853.	The whole act.
19 & 20 Vict. c. 54	Grand Juries Act 1856	The Grand Juries Act, 1856.	The whole act.
20 & 21 Vict. c. 3	Penal Servitude Act 1857	The Penal Servitude Act, 1857.	The whole act, except sections two and six.
23 & 24 Vict. c. 27	Refreshment Houses Act 1860	The Refreshment Houses Act, 1860.	In section twenty-two, the words "of felony or".
23 & 24 Vict. c. 75	Criminal Lunatic Asylums Act 1860	The Criminal Lunatic Asylums Act, 1860.	In section four, the words from "any such persons" to "council of supervision" and the words from "and to remove" to "for the asylum". Sections five, six, fourteen and fifteen.
24 & 25 Vict. c. 96	Larceny Act 1861	The Larceny Act, 1861.	In sections twelve, thirteen and sixteen, the words from "with or without hard labour" to the end. Sections one hundred and eight and one hundred and nineteen.
24 & 25 Vict. c. 97	Malicious Damage Act 1861	The Malicious Damage Act, 1861.	In sections one to ten, fourteen to twenty-one, twenty-three, twenty-six to thirty-three, thirty-five, forty-two to forty-eight and fifty, the words "and, if a male under the age of sixteen years, with or without whipping" wherever those words occur. In sections twenty-two and fifty-four, the words from "with or without hard labour" to the end. In section thirty-nine, the words from "with or without hard labour" to "whipping." Sections sixty-six and seventy-five.
24 & 25 Vict. c. 100	Offences Against the Person Act 1861	The Offences Against the Person Act, 1861.	In section five, the words "or to pay" to the end of the section. In sections sixteen, twenty-eight to thirty, thirty-two and fifty-six, the words "and, if a male under the age of sixteen years, with or without whipping" wherever those words occur. In section sixty-four, the words from "with or without hard labour" to the end. Section seventy.
26 & 27 Vict. c. 44	Garrotters Act 1863	The Garrotters Act, 1863.	The whole act.
27 & 28 Vict. c. 47	Penal Servitude Act 1864	The Penal Servitude Act, 1864.	The whole act.
28 & 29 Vict. c. 126	Prison Act 1865	The Prison Act, 1865.	Section forty-four.
33 & 34 Vict. c. 23	Forfeiture Act 1870	The Forfeiture Act, 1870.	In section two, the words "with hard labour, or". Sections six to thirty.
34 & 35 Vict. c. 112	Prevention of Crimes Act 1871	The Prevention of Crimes Act, 1871.	Sections three to five and eight. In section seventeen, paragraph (4) of the proviso.
35 & 36 Vict. c. 52	Middlesex Grand Juries Act 1872	The Middlesex Grand Juries Act, 1872.	The whole act.
39 & 40 Vict. c. 42	Convict Prisons Returns Act 1876	The Convict Prisons Returns Act, 1876.	The whole act.
40 & 41 Vict. c. 21	Prison Act 1877	The Prison Act, 1877.	In section nine, the words "and enforcement of hard labour". In section eleven, the words "and as to the commercial value of the labour on". Sections thirteen, fourteen, thirty-nine and forty.
42 & 43 Vict. c. 49	Summary Jurisdiction Act 1879	The Summary Jurisdiction Act, 1879.	In section four, the words "impose the same without hard labour and" and the words "or do either of such acts". In section ten, in subsection (2) the words from "and when the child is a male" to the end. In section eleven, in subsection (1), the words "the character and antecedents of the person charged". In section thirty-one, in subsection (1), paragraphs (iii) and (v), and in paragraph (iv) the words "on his complying with the provisions of the preceding paragraph, if he has not already done so and".
42 & 43 Vict. c. 55	Prevention of Crime Act 1879	The Prevention of Crime Act, 1879.	The whole act.
54 & 55 Vict. c. 69	Penal Servitude Act 1891	The Penal Servitude Act, 1891.	Sections two to six and ten.
55 & 56 Vict. c. 32	Clergy Discipline Act 1892	The Clergy Discipline Act, 1892.	In section one, the words "with hard labour".
60 & 61 Vict. c. 18	Juries Detention Act 1897	The Juries Detention Act, 1897.	The whole act.
61 & 62 Vict. c. 41	Prison Act 1898	The Prison Act, 1898.	Sections one to six. In section seven, the words "local and convict". Sections eight and eleven. Subsection (1) of section fourteen.
6 Edw. 7. c. 55	Public Trustee Act 1906	The Public Trustee Act, 1906.	Paragraph (e) of subsection (1) of section two.
7 Edw. 7. c. 17	Probation of Offenders Act 1907	The Probation of Offenders Act, 1907.	The whole act.
7 Edw. 7. c. 23	Criminal Appeal Act 1907	The Criminal Appeal Act, 1907.	In section seven, the words "or corporal punishment". In section fourteen, subsections (1) (3) and (5). In section twenty, in subsection (2) the words from "but shall not apply" to the end of the subsection.
8 Edw. 7. c. 59	Prevention of Crime Act 1908	The Prevention of Crime Act, 1908.	The whole act.
10 Edw. 7 & 1 Geo. 5. c. 24	Licensing (Consolidation) Act 1910	The Licensing (Consolidation) Act, 1910.	In section thirty-five, paragraph (2).
1 & 2 Geo. 5. c. 28	Official Secrets Act 1911	The Official Secrets Act, 1911.	In section ten, in subsection (2) the words "in the High Court" and the words "or the Central Criminal Court".
3 & 4 Geo. 5. c. 27	Forgery Act 1913	The Forgery Act, 1913.	In section twelve, subsection (1) and in paragraph (b) of subsection (2) the words "penal servitude or".
3 & 4 Geo. 5. c. 28	Mental Deficiency Act 1913	The Mental Deficiency Act, 1913.	The proviso to subsection (2) of section twenty-five.
4 & 5 Geo. 5. c. 58	Criminal Justice Administration Act 1914	The Criminal Justice Administration Act, 1914.	Sections seven to eleven, fifteen and sixteen, paragraph (6) of section seventeen, sections twenty-six and thirty-six and subsection (1) of section thirty-seven.
5 & 6 Geo. 5. c. 90	Indictments Act 1915	The Indictments Act, 1915.	In section four, the words "and the person accused shall have the same right of challenging jurors".
6 & 7 Geo. 5. c. 31	Police, Factories, &c. (Miscellaneous Provisions) Act 1916	The Police, Factories, &c. (Miscellaneous Provisions) Act, 1916.	Section twelve.
6 & 7 Geo. 5. c. 50	Larceny Act 1916	The Larceny Act, 1916.	In section two, the words from "and the offender" to the end. Paragraph (c) of section sixteen. In section seventeen, the words from "and in the case of a clerk" to the end. In section twenty-three, in subsection (1) the words from "and, in addition" to the end. In section twenty-nine, in subsection (1) the words from "and, if a male under the age of sixteen years" to the end. In section thirty-three, paragraph (c) of subsection (1). In section thirty-four, the words from "and, if a male under the age of sixteen years" to the end. In section thirty-seven, subsections (3), (4) and (6) and in paragraph (b) of subsection (5) the words "penal servitude or".
10 & 11 Geo. 5. c. 23	War Pensions Act 1920	The War Pensions Act, 1920.	Subsection (1) of section seven.
11 & 12 Geo. 5. c. 39	Admiralty Pensions Act 1921	The Admiralty Pensions Act, 1921.	Subsection (1) of section two.
15 & 16 Geo. 5. c. 20	Law of Property Act 1925	The Law of Property Act, 1925.	In section seven, paragraph (a) of subsection (3).
15 & 16 Geo. 5. c. 86	Criminal Justice Act 1925	The Criminal Justice Act, 1925.	Sections one to ten. In section twelve, in subsection (5) the word "forthwith," in the first place where that word occurs, the words "after the conclusion of the evidence of the accused" and the words "either forthwith or, if a speech is to be made by counsel or solicitor on behalf of the accused after the conclusion of that speech". In section twenty-four, in subsection (1) the words "the character and antecedents of the accused". Sections twenty-five and forty-six.
16 & 17 Geo. 5. c. 13	Criminal Justice (Amendment) Act 1926	The Criminal Justice (Amendment) Act, 1926.	The whole act.
16 & 17 Geo. 5. c. 58	Penal Servitude Act 1926	The Penal Servitude Act, 1926.	The whole act.
23 & 24 Geo. 5. c. 12	Children and Young Persons Act 1933	The Children and Young Persons Act, 1933.	Section thirty-three. In section forty-eight, in subsection (3) the words from "and where" to the end. Section fifty-two. In section fifty-three, in subsection (2) the words "notwithstanding anything in the other provisions of this Act". In section fifty-eight, in proviso (a), the words "undergoing detention in a Borstal Institution, or was". In section fifty-nine, the proviso to subsection (1). In section sixty-six, subsection (3). In section eighty-two, in subsection (1), the words from "and that court", to the end. So much of the Third Schedule as amends the Probation of Offenders Act, 1907. In the Fourth Schedule, in paragraph 8, the words from "and that court" to the end.
23 & 24 Geo. 5. c. 36	Administration of Justice (Miscellaneous Provisions) Act 1933	The Administration of Justice (Miscellaneous Provisions) Act, 1933.	In section one, in subsection (1) the words "Subject to the provisions of this section"; and subsection (4). In the Second Schedule, in paragraph 4, the words "in the case of any bill of indictment preferred under this Act".
23 & 24 Geo. 5. c. 38	Summary Jurisdiction (Appeals) Act 1933	The Summary Jurisdiction (Appeals) Act, 1933.	In section two, subsection (9). In section three, in subsection (1), the words "so soon as an appellant has complied with the provisions of paragraph (iii) of subsection (1) of section thirty-one of the Summary Jurisdiction Act, 1879, with respect to entering into a recognisance or giving other security" and the words "and the recognisance, if any, and a statement as to any other security given by the appellant" and in subsection (2) the word "separate".
26 Geo. 5 & 1 Edw. 8. c. 16	Coinage Offences Act 1936	The Coinage Offences Act, 1936.	In section twelve, in subsection (1), the words "penal servitude or".
1 Edw. 8 & 1 Geo. 6. c. 12	Firearms Act 1937	The Firearms Act, 1937.	In section twenty-one, in paragraph (b) of subsection (2) the words "is subject to the supervision of the police or". In section twenty-five, in subsection (1), the words "to be subject to police supervision or".
1 Edw. 8 & 1 Geo. 6. c. 58	Summary Procedure (Domestic Proceedings) Act 1937	The Summary Procedure (Domestic Proceedings) Act, 1937.	Section seven.
1 & 2 Geo. 6. c. 21	Dogs Amendment Act 1938	The Dogs Amendment Act, 1938.	In section one, the words "or until the appeal can no longer be prosecuted under the Summary Jurisdiction Acts, as the case may be".
1 & 2 Geo. 6. c. 63	Administration of Justice (Miscellaneous Provisions) Act 1938	The Administration of Justice (Miscellaneous Provisions) Act, 1938.	In section eleven, in subsection (1) the words from "and (b) any indictment" to the end of the subsection; and in subsection (2) the words from "and with respect" to the end of the subsection.
7 & 8 Geo. 6. c. 31	Education Act 1944	The Education Act, 1944.	In section one hundred and twenty, in subsection (2) the words "subsection (3) of section fifty-two and".
10 & 11 Geo. 6. c. 38	Probation Officers (Superannuation) Act 1947	The Probation Officers (Superannuation) Act, 1947.	In section two, the words from "Part I" to the words "first column of" in the second place where they occur. Part I of the Schedule.

Part II - extending to Scotland
Citation	Short title	Extent of repeal.
1 Geo. 4. c. 57	Whipping Act 1820	The whole act.
5 & 6 Vict. c. 51	Treason Act 1842	In section two the words from "and during the period of such imprisonment" to the end.
23 & 24 Vict. c. 105	Prisons (Scotland) Act 1860	Section seventy-four.
25 & 26 Vict. c. 18	Whipping Act 1862	The whole act.
48 & 49 Vict. c. 69	Criminal Law Amendment Act 1885	In section four, the words from "Provided that in the case of an offender" to "in manner in that Act mentioned".
55 & 56 Vict. c. 55	Burgh Police (Scotland) Act 1892	Section five hundred and fourteen.
2 & 3 Geo. 5. c. 20	Criminal Law Amendment Act 1912	Section three. In section seven, in subsection (5) the words from "and, in the case of a second or subsequent conviction" to the end.

Part III - extending to Scotland and Northern Ireland
Citation	Short title	Description	Extent of repeal.
20 Hen. 6. c. 9	Peeresses Act 1441	Recital of Magna Charta relating to Trial by Peers; Noble ladies to be tried as Peers of the Realm are tried.	The whole act.
31 Hen. 8. c. 10	House of Lords Precedence Act 1539	An Act for the placing of the Lords in the Parliament.	Section nine.
33 Hen. 8. c. 12	Offences within the Court Act 1541	An Act for Murder and Malicious Bloodshed within the Court.	Section seven.
35 Hen. 8. c. 2	Treason Act 1543	An Act concerning the Trial of Treasons committed out of the King's Majesty's Dominions.	Section two.
2 & 3 Edw. 6. c. 1	Act of Uniformity 1548	An Act for the uniformity of service and administration of the Sacraments throughout the Realm.	Section ten.
1 Eliz. c. 1	Act of Supremacy 1558	An Act for restoring to the Crown the ancient jurisdiction over the State Ecclesiastical and Spiritual and abolishing all foreign power repugnant to the same.	Section eighteen.
1 Eliz. c. 2	Act of Uniformity 1558	An Act for the Uniformity of Common Prayer and Divine Service in the Church, and the administration of the Sacraments.	Section nine.
2 Eliz. 1. c. 1 (I)	Act of Supremacy (Ireland) 1560	An Act of the Parliament of Ireland restoring to the Crown the ancient jurisdiction over the State Ecclesiastical and Spiritual, and abolishing all foreign power repugnant to the same.	In section fifteen, the words from "And if it shall happen" to the end of the section.
2 Eliz. 1. c. 2 (I)	Act of Uniformity 1560	An Act of the Parliament of Ireland for the Uniformity of Common Prayer and Service in the Church, and the administration of the Sacraments.	Section nine.
13 Chas. 2. Stat. 1. c. 1	Sedition Act 1661	An Act for the Safety and Preservation of His Majesty's Person and Government against Treasonable and Seditious practices and attempts.	In section seven, the words "that no peer of this realm shall be tried for any offence against this Act but by his peers, and further".
1707 c. 7	Union with England Act 1707	An Act of the Parliament of Scotland ratifying and approving the Treaty of Union of the two Kingdoms of Scotland and England.	So far as it ratifies, approves and confirms the following words in Article XXIII of the Treaty of Union, that is to say, the words from "and particularly the right of sitting upon the trials of peers" to "at such trials as any other peers of Great Britain"; the words "and shall be tried as peers of Great Britain"; and the words "and particularly the right of sitting upon the trials of peers".
6 Anne c. 11 (Note: This is the citation in The Statutes of the Realm.)	Union with Scotland Act 1706	The Union with Scotland Act, 1706.	Section four, so far as it ratifies, approves and confirms the following words in Article XXIII of the Treaty of Union, that is to say, the words from "and particularly the right of sitting upon the trials of peers" to "at such trials as any other peers of Great Britain"; the words "and shall be tried as peers of Great Britain"; and the words "and particularly the right of sitting upon the trials of peers".
6 Anne c. 78	Scottish Representative Peers Act 1707	The Scottish Representative Peers Act, 1707.	Section twelve.
33 Geo. 3. c. 45	Treason Act 1793	An Act of the Parliament of Ireland for the trial of Treason committed out of the King's dominions.	Section two.
39 & 40 Geo. 3. c. 67	Union with Ireland Act 1800	The Union with Ireland Act, 1800.	Section one, so far as it ratifies, confirms and approves the following words in Article IV of the Articles of Union, that is to say the words "and shall be tried by their peers as is usual in England or Ireland respectively", the words "as is usual in England or Ireland respectively" in the second place where those words occur, and the words "but their right and privilege of peerage, except as aforesaid, and the right and privilege of the peerage of Ireland, as defined and limited by this act".
40 Geo. 3. c. 38	Act of Union (Ireland) 1800	An Act of the Parliament of Ireland for the Union of Great Britain and Ireland	Section one, so far as it ratifies, confirms and approves the following words in Article IV of the Articles of Union, that is to say the words "and shall be tried by their peers as is usual in England or Ireland respectively", the words "as is usual in England or Ireland respectively" in the second place where those words occur, and the words "but their right and privilege of peerage, except as aforesaid, and the right and privilege of the peerage of Ireland, as defined and limited by this act".
6 Geo. 4. c. 66	Trial of Peers (Scotland) Act 1825	The Trial of Peers (Scotland) Act, 1825.	The whole act.
4 & 5 Vict. c. 22	Felony Act 1841	The Felony Act, 1841.	The whole act.
25 & 26 Vict. c. 65	Jurisdiction in Homicides Act 1862	The Jurisdiction in Homicides Act. 1862.	Section nineteen.
20 & 21 Geo. 5. c. 45	Criminal Appeal (Northern Ireland) Act 1930	The Criminal Appeal (Northern Ireland) Act, 1930.	In section nineteen, in subsection (2), the words from "but shall not apply" to the end of the subsection.

== Subsequent developments ==
Section 30 of the act was repealed by section 10(2) of, and part I of schedule 3 to, the Criminal Law Act 1967, which came into force on 1 January 1968.

The act was partially repealed, modernised and recast by acts including the Criminal Law Act 1977 and Criminal Justice Act 1982.

== See also ==
- Criminal Justice Act
- UK labour law
- Criminal Justice (Scotland) Act 1949
