= Labor camp =

Type of detention facility

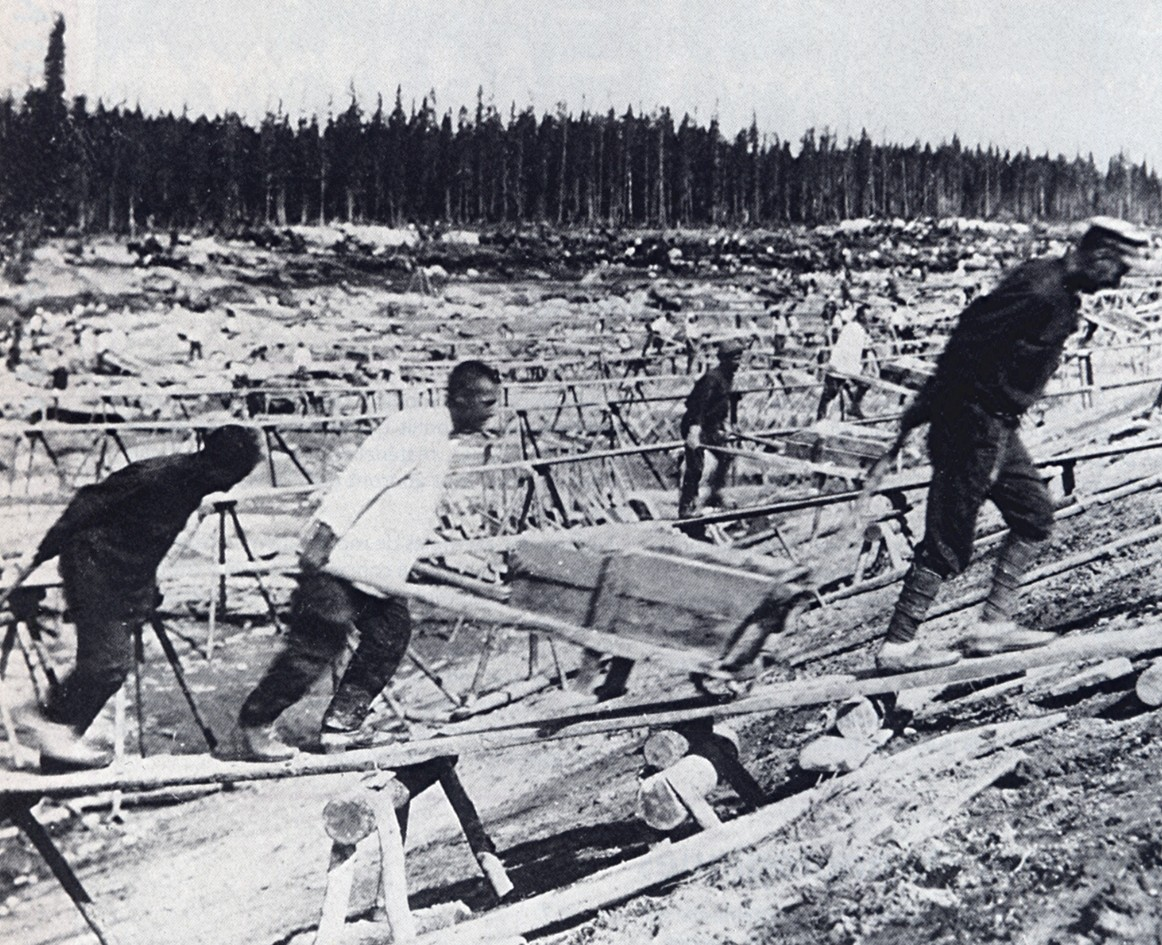
The White Sea–Baltic Canal opened on 2 August 1933 was the first major industrial project constructed in the Soviet Union using only forced labor.

A labor camp (or labour camp, see spelling differences) or work camp is a detention facility where inmates are forced to engage in penal labor as a form of punishment. Labor camps have many common aspects with slavery and with prisons (especially prison farms). Conditions at labor camps vary widely depending on the operators. Convention no. 105 of the United Nations International Labour Organization (ILO), adopted internationally on 27 June 1957, intended to abolish camps of forced labor.

In the 20th century, a new category of labor camps developed for the imprisonment of millions of people who were not criminals per se, but political opponents (real or imagined) and various so-called undesirables under communist and fascist regimes.

== Precursors ==
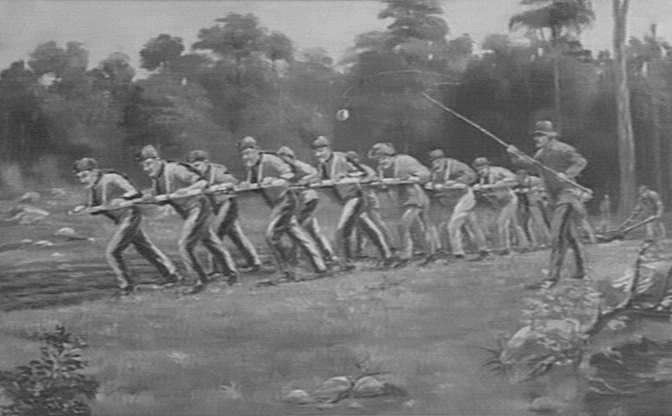
A painter's impression of a convict ploughing team breaking up new ground at a farm in Port Arthur, Tasmania in the early 20th century

Early-modern states could exploit convicts by combining prison and useful work in manning their galleys. This became the sentence of many Christian captives in the Ottoman Empire and of Calvinists (Huguenots) in pre-Revolutionary France.

== 20th century ==
=== Allies of World War II ===
The Allies of World War II operated a number of work camps after the war. At the Yalta Conference in 1945, it was agreed that German forced labor was to be utilized as reparations. The majority of the camps were in the Soviet Union, but more than one million Germans were forced to work in French coal-mines and British agriculture, as well as 500,000 in US-run Military Labor Service Units in occupied Germany itself. See Forced labor of Germans after World War II.

=== Burma ===
According to the New Statesman, Burmese military government operated, from 1962 to 2011, about 91 labour camps for political prisoners.

=== China ===
The anti-communist Kuomintang operated various camps between 1938 and 1949, including the Northwestern Youth Labor Camp for young activists and students.
The Chinese Communist Party has operated many labor camps for some crimes at least since taking power in 1949. Many leaders of China were put into labor camps after purges, including Deng Xiaoping and Liu Shaoqi. May Seventh Cadre Schools are an example of Cultural Revolution-era labor camps.

=== Cuba ===
Beginning in November 1965, people classified as "against the government" were summoned to work camps referred to as "Military Units to Aid Production" (UMAP).

=== Czechoslovakia ===
After the communists took over Czechoslovakia in 1948, many forced labor camps were created. The inmates included political prisoners, clergy, kulaks, Boy Scout leaders and many other groups of people that were considered enemies of the state. About half of the prisoners worked in the uranium mines. These camps lasted until 1961.
Also between 1950 and 1954 many men were considered "politically unreliable" for compulsory military service, and were conscripted to labour battalions (Czech: Pomocné technické prapory (PTP)) instead.

=== Communist Hungary ===
Following sentence, political prisoners were imprisoned. To serve this purpose, a large number of internment camps (e.g., in Kistarcsa (Kistarcsa internment camp), Recsk (Recsk forced labor camp), Tiszalök, Kazincbarcika and according to the latest research, in Bernátkút and Sajóbábony) were placed under the supervision of the State Protection Authority. The most notorious of these camps were in Recsk, Kistarcsa, Tiszalök and Kazincbarcika.

=== Italian Libya ===
During the colonisation of Libya the Italians deported most of the Libyan population in Cyrenaica to concentration camps and used the survivors to build in semi-slave conditions the coastal road and new agricultural projects.

=== Germany ===
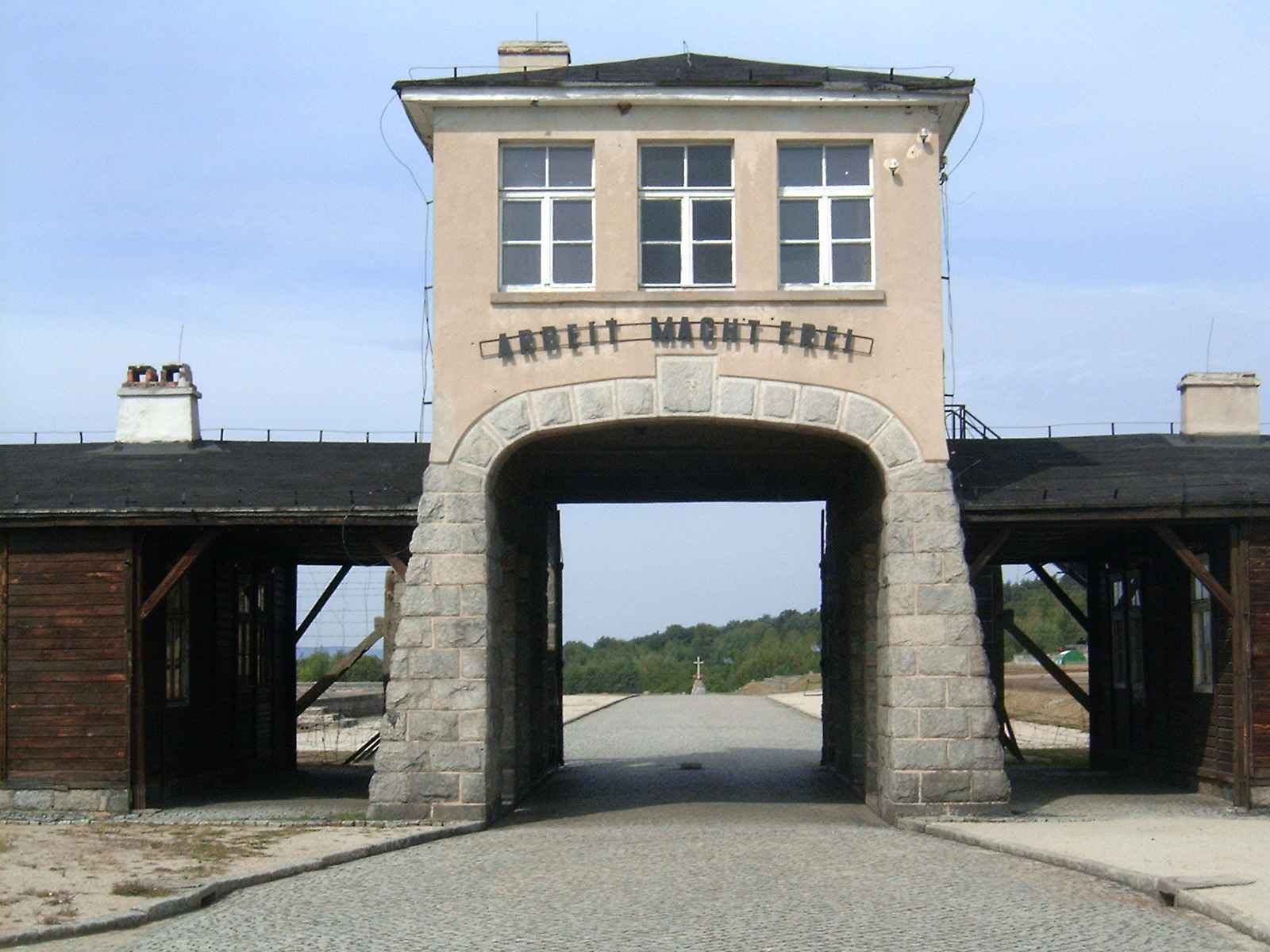
Gross-Rosen

During World War II the Nazis operated several categories of Arbeitslager (Labor Camps) for different categories of inmates. The largest number of them held Jewish civilians forcibly abducted in the occupied countries (see Łapanka) to provide labor in the German war industry, repair bombed railroads and bridges or work on farms. By 1944, 19.9% of all workers were foreigners, either civilians or prisoners of war.
The Nazis employed many slave laborers. They also operated concentration camps, some of which provided free forced labor for industrial and other jobs while others existed purely for the extermination of their inmates. A notable example is the Mittelbau-Dora labor camp complex that serviced the production of the V-2 rocket. See List of German concentration camps for more.

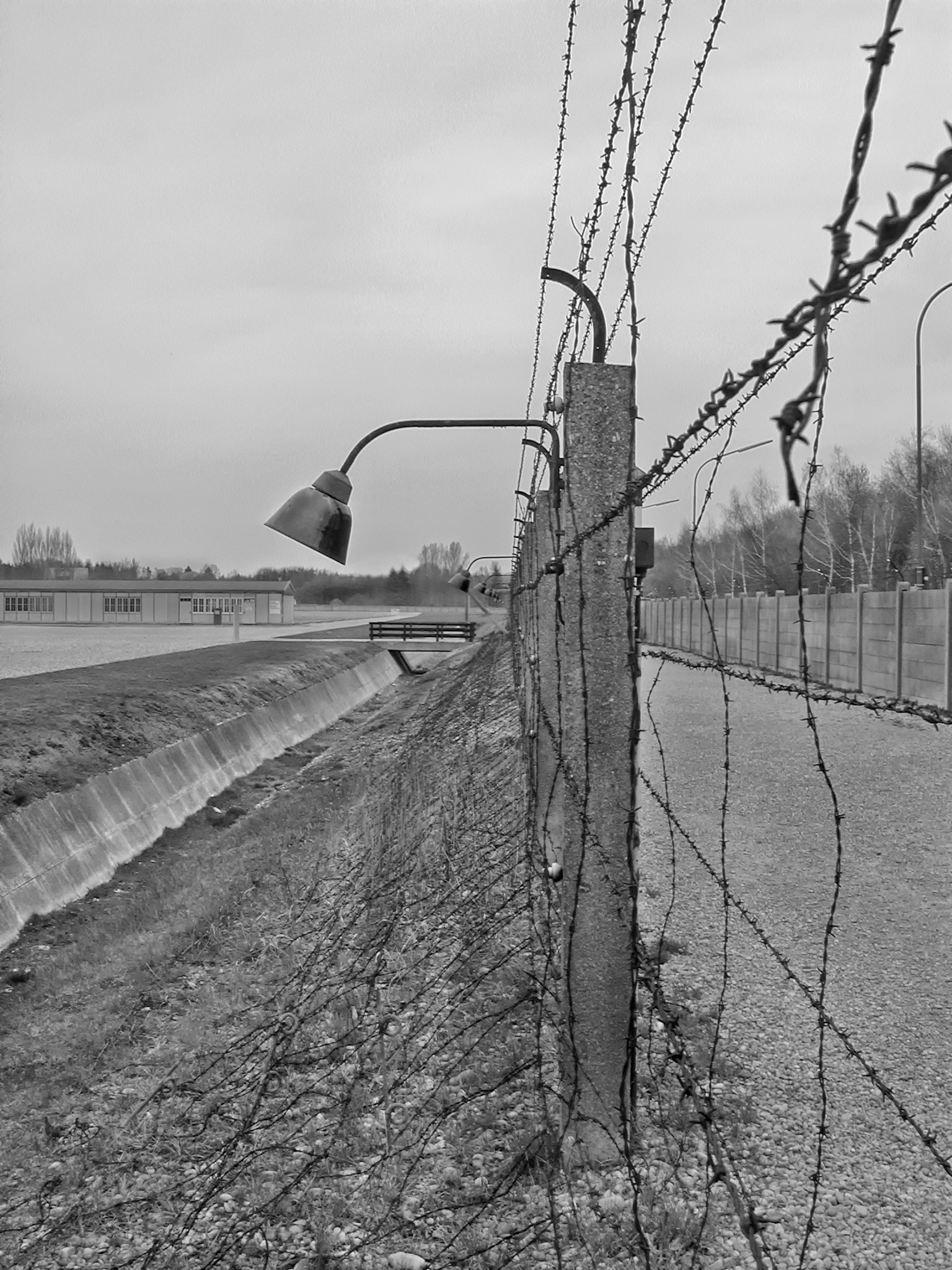
Dachau Concentration Camp Perimeter Fence

The Nazi camps played a key role in the extermination of millions. The phrase Arbeit macht frei ("Work makes one free") has become a symbol of The Holocaust.

=== Imperial Japan ===
During the early 20th century, the Empire of Japan used the forced labor of millions of civilians from conquered countries and prisoners of war, especially during the Second Sino-Japanese War and the Pacific War, on projects such as the Death Railway. Hundreds of thousands of people died as a direct result of the overwork, malnutrition, preventable disease and violence which were commonplace on these projects.

=== North Korea ===
North Korea is known to operate six camps with prison-labor colonies for political criminals (Kwan-li-so). The total number of prisoners in these colonies is 150,000 to 200,000. Once condemned as a political criminal in North Korea, the defendant and his/or her family are incarcerated for life in one of the camps without trial and cut off from all outside contact.

See also: North Korean prison system

=== Russia and the Soviet Union ===
Imperial Russia operated a system of remote Siberian forced labor camps as part of its regular judicial system, called katorga.

The Soviet Union took over the already extensive katorga system and expanded it immensely, eventually organizing the Gulag to run the camps. In 1954, a year after Stalin's death, the new Soviet government of Nikita Khrushchev began to release political prisoners and close down the camps. By the end of the 1950s, virtually all "corrective labor camps" were reorganized, mostly into the system of corrective labor colonies. Officially, the Gulag was terminated by the MVD order 20 of January 25, 1960.

During the period of Stalinism, the Gulag labor camps in the Soviet Union were officially called "Corrective labor camps". The term "labor colony"; more exactly, "Corrective labor colony", (Russian: исправительно-трудовая колония, abbr. ИТК), was also in use, most notably the ones for underaged (16 years or younger) convicts and captured besprizorniki (street children, literally, "children without family care"). After the reformation of the camps into the Gulag, the term "corrective labor colony" essentially encompassed labor camps.

=== Sweden ===
14 labor camps were operated by the Swedish state during World War II. The majority of internees were communists, but radical social democrats, syndicalists, anarchists, trade unionists, anti-fascists and other "unreliable elements" of Swedish society, as well as German dissidents and deserters from the Wehrmacht, were also interned. The internees were placed in the labor camps indefinitely, without trial, and without being informed of the accusations made against them. Officially, the camps were called "labor companies" (Swedish: arbetskompanier). The system was established by the Royal Board of Social Affairs and sanctioned by the third cabinet of Per Albin Hansson, a grand coalition which included all parties represented in the Swedish Riksdag, with the notable exception of the Communist Party of Sweden.

After the war, many former camp inmates had difficulty finding a job, since they had been branded as "subversive elements".

=== United States ===
During the United States occupation of Haiti, the United States Marine Corps and their Gendarmerie of Haiti subordinates enforced a corvée system upon Haitians. The corvée resulted in the deaths of hundreds, and possibly thousands, of Haitians, with Haitian American academic Michel-Rolph Trouillot estimating that about 5,500 Haitians died in labor camps. In addition, Roger Gaillard writes that some Haitians were killed fleeing the camps or if they did not work satisfactorily.

=== Yugoslavia ===
The Goli Otokprison camp for political opponents ran from 1946 to 1956.

== 21st century ==
=== China ===
The Standing Committee of the National People's Congress of the People's Republic of China, which closed on December 28, 2013, passed a decision on abolishing the legal provisions on reeducation through labor. However, penal labor allegedly continues to exist in Xinjiang re-education camps.

=== North Korea ===
North Korea is known to operate six camps with prison-labor colonies for political criminals (Kwan-li-so). The total number of prisoners in these colonies is 150,000 – 200,000. Once condemned as a political criminal in North Korea, the defendant and their families are incarcerated for lifetime in one of the camps without trial, and are cut off from all outside contact.

=== United States ===
In 1997, a United States Army document was developed that "provides guidance on establishing prison camps on [US] Army installations." The United States makes use of forced penal labor in its prison system, through collaboration with companies such as Whole Foods, McDonald's, Target, IBM, and more. There are an estimated 800,000 prisoners in US prisons. Additionally, an estimated 30,000 – 35,000 individuals are performing forced or coerced labour within ICE detainment facilities, approximately 50% of all people held in ICE detention for more than a few days perform labour in these facilities.

== See also ==
- Chain gang
- Civilian Inmate Labor Program
- Extermination through labor
- Penal colony
