= Civilian Inmate Labor Program =

The Civilian Inmate Labor Program is a program of the United States Army provided by Army Regulation 210–35. The regulation, first drafted in 1997, underwent a "rapid act revision" in January 2005; it provides policy for the creation of labor programs and prison camps on Army installations. The labor would be provided by persons under the supervision of the Federal Bureau of Prisons.

== Labor programs ==
Labor programs set forth by the Civilian Inmate Labor Program regulation involve the use of minimum and low-security inmates from facilities under the control of the Federal Bureau of Prisons, with a few apparent exceptions for state-held and locally-held inmates, on installations controlled by the Army. Army Regulation 210-35 outlines two purposes for this docket:

1. Provides Army policy and guidance for establishing civilian inmate labor programs and civilian prison camps on Army installations.
2. Discusses sources of federal and state civilian inmate labor.

The regulation states that labor programs benefit the Army and the corrections facilities by supplying "a source of labor at no direct cost to the Army", giving "meaningful work to inmates" and alleviation to "overcrowding in nearby corrections facilities" and by making use of otherwise unused land and buildings.

The statement of purpose of the regulation is as such:

This policy provides army policy and guidance for establishing civilian inmate labor programs and civilian prison camps on Army installations. Sources of civilian inmate labor are limited to:

1. On- and off-post federal corrections facilities
2. State and/or local corrections facilities operating from on-post prison camps pursuant to leases under section 2667, title 10, United States Code, allowing for any residents of camps deemed by the secretary of defense to promote the public interest or be a matter of national security to be used for this program.
3. Off-post facilities participating in the demonstration project authorized under Section 1065, Public Law (PL) 103–337, otherwise state and/or local inmate labor from off-post corrections facilities is currently excluded from this program.

The regulation indicates that the inmates could perform labor as allowed by 18 USC 4125(A).

== Prison camps ==
The regulation also sets forth policy for the creation of prison camps on Army installations. These would be used to keep inmates of the labor programs resident on the installations.

In January 2006, Kellogg, Brown and Root reported that they had received a contract from the Department of Homeland Security to expand ICE DRO facilities "in the event of an emergency influx of immigrants into the U.S., or to support the rapid development of new programs." ICE has "joint federal facilities" with the Federal Bureau of Prisons.

== See also ==
- Incarceration in the United States
- Labor camp
- Penal labor in the United States
- United States Department of the Army
