= Probation of Offenders Act 1907 =

Act of the Parliament of the United Kingdom

Probation of Offenders Act 1907 (Note: Section 10(1).)
- Act of Parliament
- Parliament of the United Kingdom
- Long title: An Act to permit the Release on Probation of Offenders in certain cases, and for other matters incidental thereto.
- Citation: 7 Edw. 7. c. 17
- Territorial extent: United Kingdom

Dates
- Royal assent: 21 August 1907
- Commencement: 1 January 1908 (Note: Section 10(3).)
- Repealed: England and Wales: 1 August 1949 (Note: The Criminal Justice Act 1948 (Date of Commencement) (No. 3) Order 1949 (SI 1949/1045).); Scotland:
Other legislation
| Amends | Summary Jurisdiction Act 1879; Youthful Offenders Act 1901 |
| Repeals/revokes | Probation of First Offenders Act 1887 |
| Amended by | Children Act 1908 |
| Repealed by | England and Wales: Criminal Justice Act 1948; Scotland: Criminal Justice (Scotland) Act 1949 |

Status: Repealed

Text of statute as originally enacted

The Probation of Offenders Act 1907 (7 Edw. 7. c. 17) was an act of the Parliament of the United Kingdom, commonly referred to as just the Probation Act.

== Enactment ==
The act was passed on 21 August 1907 and originally extended throughout the United Kingdom of Great Britain and Ireland. It remains in force in the Republic of Ireland.

== Summary ==
The act allows judges wide latitude to dismiss a charge tried summarily against a defendant even when the court thinks it is proved, or to conditionally discharge a defendant (whether the charge is tried summarily or on indictment). The power may be invoked when the court is of the opinion that

having regard to the character, antecedents, age, health, or mental condition of the person charged, or to the trivial nature of the offence, or to the extenuating circumstances under which the offence was committed, it is inexpedient to inflict any punishment or any other than a nominal punishment, or that it is expedient to release the offender on probation[.]

In practice, cases may be dismissed under the Probation Act for a defendant on condition that he pays a contribution to charity, or repays an amount stolen, or pays the costs arising from his actions. They may also be dismissed where the offence is technical or trivial. The application of the Act has occasionally caused controversy where victims or persons affected by the crime feel that the dismissal is inappropriate.

Despite the name, a dismissal under the Probation Act does not put the offender on probation in the sense of having to report to and engage with a probation officer, unless it is expressed to do so. Indeed, if a defendant is "given the Probation Act", it does not count as a criminal conviction, although it has been known to negatively affect travel abroad.

== Subsequent developments ==
The whole act was repealed for England and Wales by section 83(3) of, and part I of the tenth schedule to, the Criminal Justice Act 1948 (11 & 12 Geo. 6. c. 58), which came into force on 1 August 1949.

The whole act was repealed for Scotland by section 79(3) of, and the twelfth schedule to, the Criminal Justice (Scotland) Act 1949 (12, 13 & 14 Geo. 6. c. 94), which came into force on.
