= Ashurst–Sumners Act =

- Long title: An Act to prohibit the transportation in interstate or foreign commerce of goods manufactured by convict labor.
- Enacted by: the 73rd United States Congress
- Effective: June 6, 1934

Citations
- Public law: Pub. L. 73–215
- Statutes at Large: 48 Stat. 909

Codification
- Acts amended: Prison Industry Enhancement Certification Program (1979)
- Titles amended: 18 U.S.C. §§ 1761–1762

Legislative history
- Introduced in the Senate by Sen. Henry F. Ashurst (D–AZ); Signed into law by President Franklin D. Roosevelt on June 6, 1934

United States Supreme Court cases
- Kentucky Whip & Collar Co. v. Illinois Central R. Co., 299 U.S. 334 (1937)

The Ashurst–Sumners Act, Pub. L. No. 74-215, 49 Stat. 494 (1935), codified at 18 U.S.C. §§1761-62, is a United States Act of Congress that made it unlawful to knowingly transport in interstate or foreign commerce goods made by convict labor. Certain exceptions are provided for agricultural commodities, parts for the repair of farm machinery, commodities manufactured in a Federal, District of Columbia, or State institution for use by the Federal Government, or by the District of Columbia, or by any State or Political subdivision of a State or not-for-profit organizations. The Act is currently reflected in United States Code Title 18 Sections 1761–1762 which provide in part:

Whoever knowingly transports in interstate commerce or from any foreign country into the United States any goods, wares, or merchandise manufactured, produced, or mined, wholly or in part by convicts or prisoners, except convicts or prisoners on parole, supervised release, or probation, or in any penal or reformatory institution, shall be fined under this title or imprisoned not more than two years, or both.

The constitutionality of the act was upheld by the United States Supreme Court in Kentucky Whip & Collar Co. v. Illinois Central R. Co., 299 U.S. 334 (1937).

The Prison Industry Enhancement Certification Program, created by Congress in 1979, provides another exception from the Act. It exempts certified state and local departments of corrections from normal restrictions on the sale of prisoner-made goods in interstate commerce.

The Ashurst–Sumners Act limits prison industries and prison labor while preserving a double government monopoly over the manufacturing and sale of prison-made goods and prison labor. Governments can purchase their needs from prison industries, but they do not have to purchase prison-made goods. The Prison Industry Enhancement Certification Program carved out an exception that allowed a limited number of institutions to sell products made with prison labor. The prisoners must volunteer, and must be paid fairly. However, the prison can make certain deductions from the prisoners' wages.
