= Crank machine =

Device for penal labour

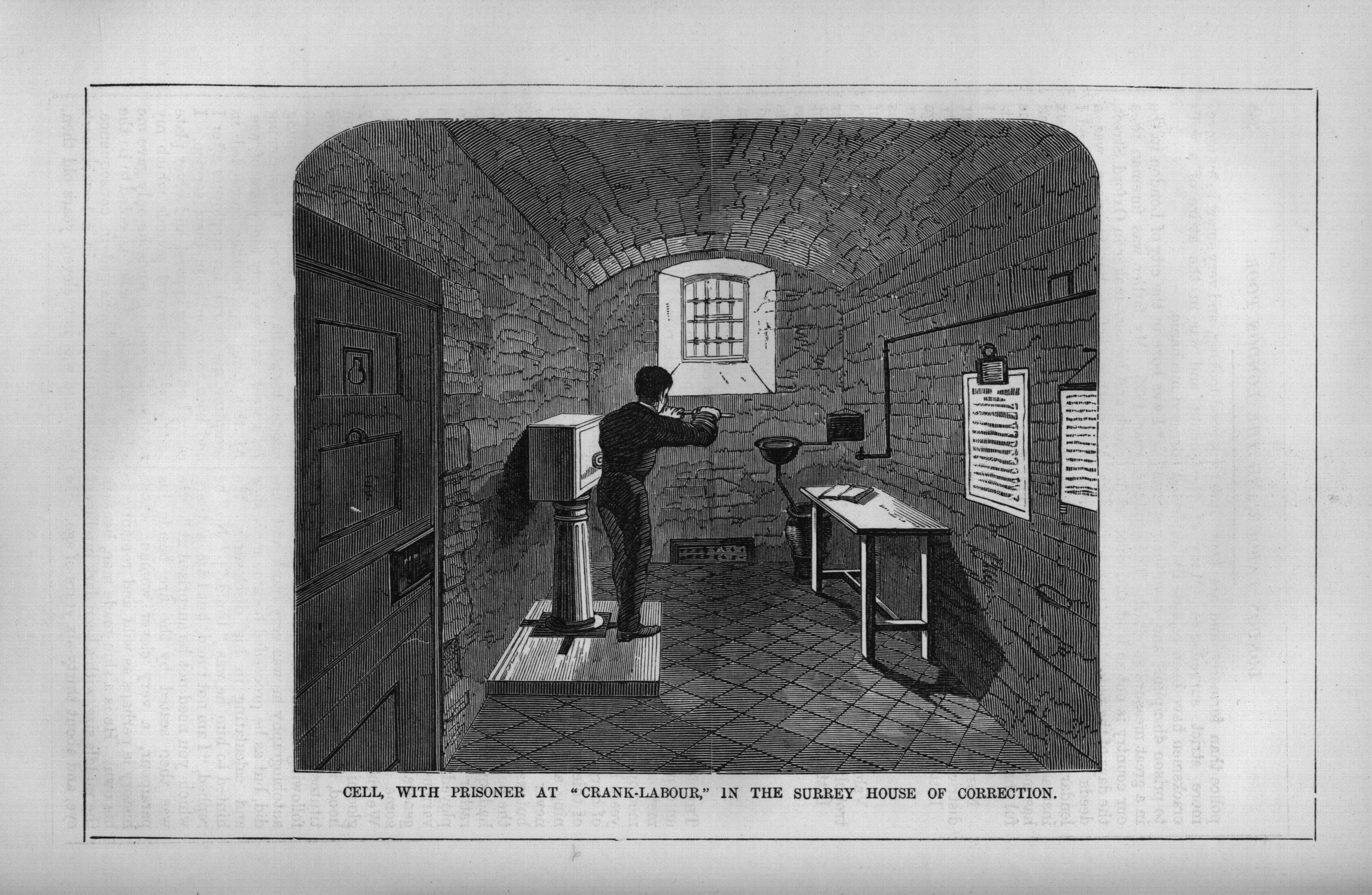
Cell, with Prisoner at Crank-Labour, In the Surrey House of Correction, 1851, illustration from London Labour and the London Poor by Henry Mayhew

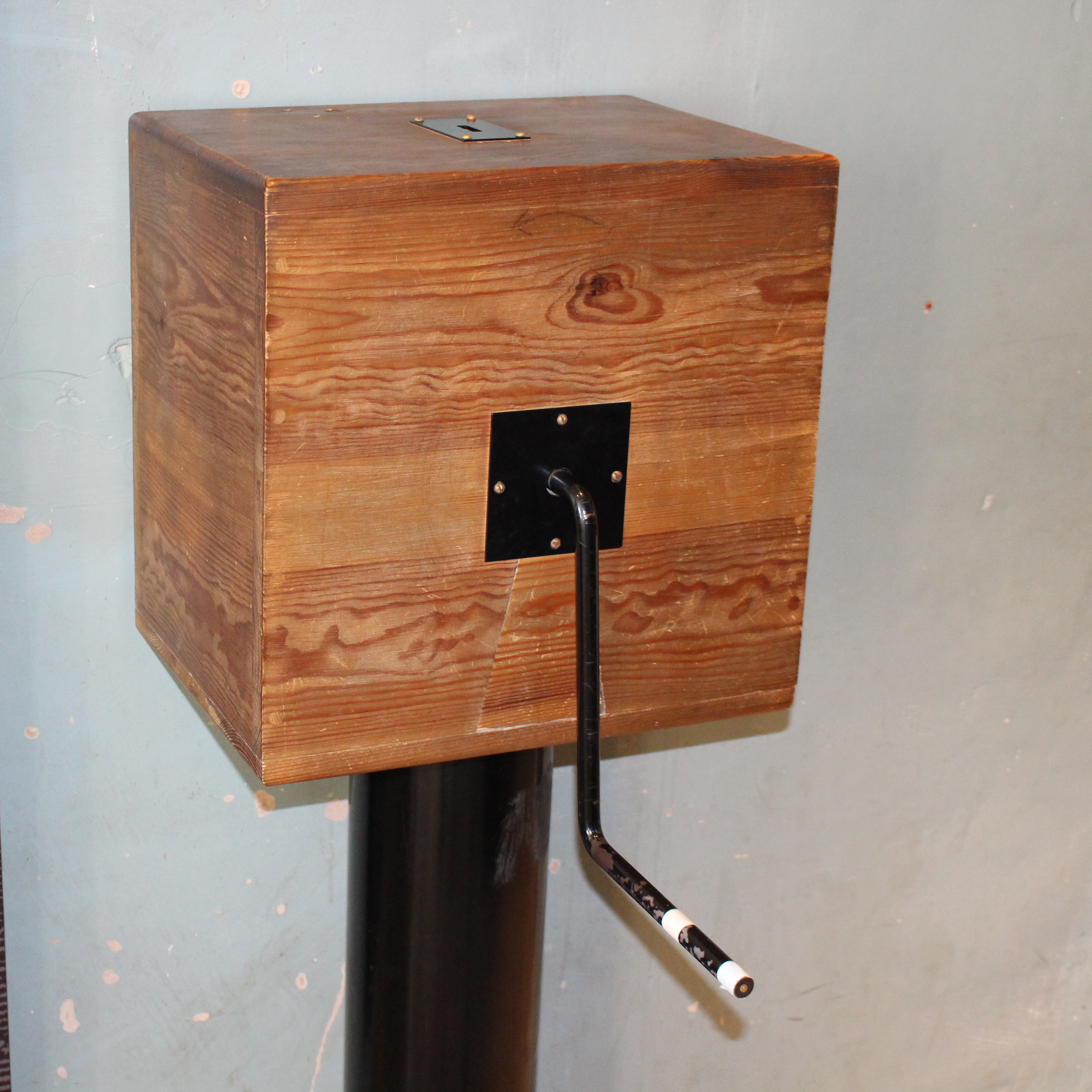
Crank machine model, from the Oxford Prison & Castle museum.

The crank machine was a penal labour device used in England in the 19th century. It consisted of a hand-turned crank which forced four large cups or ladles through sand inside a drum, doing nothing useful.

The prisoner would typically be forced to do 6,000–14,400 revolutions over the period of six hours per day (1.5–3.6 seconds per revolution). The prison warden could make the task harder by tightening an adjusting screw.

In 1895, there were 29 crank machines in use, but by 1901 there were only 5.

== See also ==
- Penal treadmill

== Bibliography ==
- "Inveraray Jail and County Court, Life in Jail". 2016. Archived from the original on 12 February 2015.
- "BBC - A History of the World - The Crank". 2014.
- "Prison Treadmills". No tech. Low-tech magazine.
