= Criminal Justice (Scotland) Act 1949 =

Act of the Parliament of the United Kingdom

Criminal Justice (Scotland) Act 1949 (Note: Section 79(1).)
- Act of Parliament
- Parliament of the United Kingdom
- Long title: An Act to amend the law of Scotland relating to the probation of offenders, and the powers of courts under the Children and Young Persons (Scotland) Act, 1937; to abolish certain punishments and obsolete sanctions, and otherwise to reform existing methods and provide new methods of dealing with offenders; to alter the law relating to the proceedings of criminal courts in Scotland; to amend the False Oaths (Scotland) Act, 1933; to regulate the management of prisons and other institutions in Scotland and the treatment of offenders and other persons committed to custody; to make certain consequential amendments to the Criminal Justice Act, 1948; and for purposes connected with the aforesaid matters.
- Citation: 12, 13 & 14 Geo. 6. c. 94
- Territorial extent: Scotland (Note: Section 79(1).)

Dates
- Royal assent: 16 December 1949
- Commencement: various (Note: Section 79(2).)
- Repealed: 1 April 1996
Other legislation
Amends	Treason Act 1790; Treason Act 1814; See § Repealed enactments
Repeals/revokes	See § Repealed enactments
Amended by	Prisons (Scotland) Act 1952; Education (Scotland) Act 1962; Summary Jurisdiction (Scotland) Act 1954; Homicide Act 1957; Mental Health Act 1959; Mental Health (Scotland) Act 1960; Firearms Act 1968; Powers of Criminal Courts Act 1973; Criminal Procedure (Scotland) Act 1975; Police Pensions Act 1976; Statute Law (Repeals) Act 1977
Repealed by	Criminal Procedure (Consequential Provisions) (Scotland) Act 1995
Relates to	Criminal Justice Act 1948

Status: Repealed

Text of statute as originally enacted

Revised text of statute as amended

The Criminal Justice (Scotland) Act 1949 (12, 13 & 14 Geo. 6. c. 94) was an act of the Parliament of the United Kingdom that amended the law relating to the probation of offenders, abolished certain punishments and obsolete sanctions, and otherwise reformed the criminal justice system in Scotland.

The Criminal Justice Act 1948 (11 & 12 Geo. 6. c. 58) made equivalent provisions fro England and Wales.

== Provisions ==
=== Repealed enactments ===
Section 79(3) of the act repealed 36 enactments, listed in the twelfth schedule to the act.

Citation	Short title	Extent of repeal
3 Geo. 4. c. 114	Hard Labour Act 1822	The whole act.
5 Geo. 4. c. 84	Transportation Act 1824	The whole act.
11 Geo. 4 & 1 Will. 4. c. 39	Transportation Act 1830	Section two.
4 & 5 Will. 4. c. 67	Transportation Act 1834	The whole act.
5 & 6 Vict. c. 61	South Australia Act 1842	The whole act.
6 & 7 Vict. c. 7	Transportation Act 1843	The whole act.
10 & 11 Vict. c. 67	Transportation Act 1847	Section two.
16 & 17 Vict. c. 99	Penal Servitude Act 1853	The whole act.
20 & 21 Vict. c. 3	Penal Servitude Act 1857	The whole act except sections two and six.
23 & 24 Vict. c. 105	Prisons (Scotland) Act 1860	Sections seventy-two and seventy-three.
27 & 28 Vict. c. 47	Penal Servitude Act 1864	The whole act.
34 & 35 Vict. c. 112	Prevention of Crimes Act 1871	Sections three to five and eight.
40 & 41 Vict. c. 53	Prisons (Scotland) Act 1877	Section six.
40 & 41 Vict. c. 53	Prisons (Scotland) Act 1877	In section ten, the words "and enforcement of hard labour".
40 & 41 Vict. c. 53	Prisons (Scotland) Act 1877	Sections fourteen, fifteen, twenty-seven.
40 & 41 Vict. c. 53	Prisons (Scotland) Act 1877	In section twenty-eight, the words from "may from time to time" to "convicted criminal prisoners, and".
40 & 41 Vict. c. 53	Prisons (Scotland) Act 1877	Sections twenty-nine, thirty-seven, forty-four to fifty, fifty-two, fifty-eight and sixty-four.
42 & 43 Vict. c. 55	Prevention of Crime Act 1879	The whole act.
50 & 51 Vict. c. 35	Criminal Procedure (Scotland) Act 1887	In section nineteen, the words "previous conviction or" and the words from "every such conviction" to the end of the section.
50 & 51 Vict. c. 35	Criminal Procedure (Scotland) Act 1887	In section twenty-seven, the words "and any extract convictions that are to be produced" and the words from "and where" to the end of the section.
50 & 51 Vict. c. 35	Criminal Procedure (Scotland) Act 1887	In section twenty-nine, the words "and extract convictions relative thereto".
50 & 51 Vict. c. 35	Criminal Procedure (Scotland) Act 1887	In section thirty-one, the words "other than productions to prove previous convictions".
50 & 51 Vict. c. 35	Criminal Procedure (Scotland) Act 1887	In sections sixty-three, sixty-four and sixty-five the words "Extracts of".
50 & 51 Vict. c. 35	Criminal Procedure (Scotland) Act 1887	In section sixty-six, the words from "such conviction shall be held" to "notice is given".
50 & 51 Vict. c. 35	Criminal Procedure (Scotland) Act 1887	In Schedule A, in the first of the examples of indictments, from "add in case" to "as the case may be".
54 & 55 Vict. c. 69	Penal Servitude Act 1891	In section one, in subsection (2) the words "with or without hard labour".
54 & 55 Vict. c. 69	Penal Servitude Act 1891	Sections two to six and ten.
7 Edw. 7. c. 17	Probation of Offenders Act 1907	The whole act.
8 Edw. 7. c. 59	Prevention of Crime Act 1908	The whole act.
8 Edw. 7. c. 65	Summary Jurisdiction (Scotland) Act 1908	In section seven, in paragraph (1) the words "with or without hard labour".
8 Edw. 7. c. 65	Summary Jurisdiction (Scotland) Act 1908	In section eleven in paragraph (4) the words "with or without hard labour".
8 Edw. 7. c. 65	Summary Jurisdiction (Scotland) Act 1908	In section twelve, the words "with or without hard labour".
8 Edw. 7. c. 65	Summary Jurisdiction (Scotland) Act 1908	In section forty-three, the words "with or without hard labour" and paragraph (2).
8 Edw. 7. c. 65	Summary Jurisdiction (Scotland) Act 1908	In section seventy-seven, in paragraph (4) the words "and forty-eight".
8 Edw. 7. c. 65	Summary Jurisdiction (Scotland) Act 1908	In Schedule B, in sections sixty-three, sixty-four and sixty-five of the Criminal Procedure (Scotland) Act 1887 as applied to summary proceedings the words "Extracts of".
8 Edw. 7. c. 65	Summary Jurisdiction (Scotland) Act 1908	In Schedule C, the words from "A statutory charge" to the end of the List of Previous Convictions.
8 Edw. 7. c. 65	Summary Jurisdiction (Scotland) Act 1908	Schedule E, so far as it relates to the probation of offenders.
9 Edw. 7. c. 2	Prisons (Scotland) Act 1909	The whole act.
3 & 4 Geo. 5. c. 38	Mental Deficiency and Lunacy (Scotland) Act 1913	Section nine, so far as it relates to persons charged with offences.
3 & 4 Geo. 5. c. 38	Mental Deficiency and Lunacy (Scotland) Act 1913	In section twenty-five, in subsection (2), the proviso.
4 & 5 Geo. 5. c. 58	Criminal Justice Administration Act 1914	Sections seven to nine, eleven and twenty-six.
4 & 5 Geo. 5. c. 58	Criminal Justice Administration Act 1914	In section forty-two, paragraphs (8) and (11).
15 & 16 Geo. 5. c. 81	Circuit Courts and Criminal Procedure (Scotland) Act 1925	In section three, the words from "omitting so far as necessary" to "convictions and".
16 & 17 Geo. 5. c. 15	Criminal Appeal (Scotland) Act 1926	In section nine, subsections (3) and (5).
16 & 17 Geo. 5. c. 15	Criminal Appeal (Scotland) Act 1926	In section sixteen, the words from "petition for" to "reference to the" and the word "to" in the second place where it occurs.
16 & 17 Geo. 5. c. 58	Penal Servitude Act 1926	The whole act.
21 & 22 Geo. 5. c. 30	Probation of Offenders (Scotland) Act 1931	The whole act.
23 & 24 Geo. 5. c. 20	False Oaths (Scotland) Act 1933	In section two, the words "with or without hard labour".
25 & 26 Geo. 5. c. 32	Criminal Lunatics (Scotland) Act 1935	In section one, subsection (1) and sections two, three and seven.
26 Geo. 5 & 1 Edw. 8. c. 16	Coinage Offences Act 1936	In section twelve, in subsection (1) the words "penal servitude or".
1 Edw. 8 & 1 Geo. 6. c. 12	Firearms Act 1937	In section twenty-one, in paragraph (b) of subsection (2) the words "is subject to the supervision of the police or".
1 Edw. 8 & 1 Geo. 6. c. 12	Firearms Act 1937	In section twenty-five, in subsection (1) the words "to be subject to police supervision or".
1 Edw. 8 & 1 Geo. 6. c. 37	Children and Young Persons (Scotland) Act 1937	Section forty-one.
1 Edw. 8 & 1 Geo. 6. c. 37	Children and Young Persons (Scotland) Act 1937	Section fifty-six.
1 Edw. 8 & 1 Geo. 6. c. 37	Children and Young Persons (Scotland) Act 1937	In section fifty-seven, in subsection (2) the words "notwithstanding anything in the other provisions of this Act".
1 Edw. 8 & 1 Geo. 6. c. 37	Children and Young Persons (Scotland) Act 1937	In section sixty-two, in proviso (a), the words "undergoing detention in a Borstal Institution or was".
1 Edw. 8 & 1 Geo. 6. c. 37	Children and Young Persons (Scotland) Act 1937	Section sixty-four.
1 Edw. 8 & 1 Geo. 6. c. 37	Children and Young Persons (Scotland) Act 1937	In section seventy, subsection (3).
1 Edw. 8 & 1 Geo. 6. c. 37	Children and Young Persons (Scotland) Act 1937	In section eighty-six, in subsection (1) the words from "and that court" to the end of the subsection.
1 Edw. 8 & 1 Geo. 6. c. 37	Children and Young Persons (Scotland) Act 1937	In the Second Schedule, in paragraph 8 the words from "and that court" to the end of the paragraph.
1 & 2 Geo. 6. c. 48	Criminal Procedure (Scotland) Act 1938	Section ten.
9 & 10 Geo. 6. c. 72	Education (Scotland) Act 1946	In section one hundred and forty-two, in subsection (1), the words "subsection (3) of section fifty-six and".
11 & 12 Geo. 6. c. 38	Companies Act 1948	Section four hundred and forty-three.
11 & 12 Geo. 6. c. 43	Children Act 1948	The Third Schedule, so far as it relates to section forty-three of the Children and Young Persons (Scotland) Act 1937.
11 & 12 Geo. 6. c. 58	Criminal Justice Act 1948	Section ten.
11 & 12 Geo. 6. c. 58	Criminal Justice Act 1948	In section seventy-one, subsection (4); section eighty-one so far as it relates to sections ten and seventy-one.
11 & 12 Geo. 6. c. 58	Criminal Justice Act 1948	Part I of the Seventh Schedule.

== Subsequent developments ==
The whole act was repealed by section 6(1) of, and schedule 5 to, the Criminal Procedure (Consequential Provisions) (Scotland) Act 1995 (1995 c. 40), which came into force on 1 April 1996.
