= Penal Servitude Act =

Stock short title used for UK legislation

Penal Servitude Act is a stock short title which was used in the United Kingdom for legislation relating to penal servitude. The abolition of penal servitude has rendered this short title obsolete in that country.

== List ==
Penal Servitude Act 1853 (Note: The citation of this act by this short title was authorised by section 1 of, and the first schedule to, the Short Titles Act 1896. Due to the repeal of those provisions it is now authorised by section 19(2) of the Interpretation Act 1978.)
- Act of Parliament
- Parliament of the United Kingdom
- Long title: An Act to substitute, in certain Cases, other Punishment in lieu of Transportation.
- Citation: 16 & 17 Vict. c. 99
- Territorial extent: United Kingdom

Dates
- Royal assent: 20 August 1853
- Commencement: 1 September 1853 (Note: Section 16.)
- Repealed: England and Wales: 18 April 1949 (Note: The Criminal Justice Act 1948 (Date of Commencement) Order 1949.); Scotland: Northern Ireland:

Other legislation
- Amended by: Penal Servitude Act 1857; Criminal Statutes Repeal Act 1861; Penal Servitude Act 1864; Statute Law Revision Act 1875
- Repealed by: England and Wales: Criminal Justice Act 1948; Scotland: Criminal Justice (Scotland) Act 1949; Northern Ireland: Criminal Justice (Northern Ireland) Act 1953

Status: Repealed

Text of statute as originally enacted

- The Penal Servitude Act 1853 (16 & 17 Vict. c. 99) (repealed by the Criminal Justice Act 1948, s.83(3) & Sch.10, Pt.I)
- The Penal Servitude Act 1857 (20 & 21 Vict. c. 3) (short title: 1896) Legislation.gov.uk
- The Penal Servitude Act 1864 (27 & 28 Vict. c. 47)
- The Penal Servitude Act 1891 (54 & 55 Vict. c. 69) (short title: 1896) Legislation.gov.uk
- The Penal Servitude Act 1926 (16 & 17 Geo. 5. c. 58) (repealed by the Criminal Justice Act 1948, s.83(3) & Sch.10, Pt.I)

The Penal Servitude Acts 1853 to 1891 is the collective title of the Penal Servitude Act 1853, the Penal Servitude Act 1857, the Penal Servitude Act 1864 and the Penal Servitude Act 1891.

== See also ==
- List of short titles
