= Northwestern Youth Labor Camp =

Chinese labor camp

The Northwestern Youth Labor Camp was a Chinese labor camp for politically suspect youth established during the Chinese Civil War by order of Kuomintang Generalissimo Chiang Kai-shek on 1 February 1940. Administered by military training units under General Jiang Jianren, the labor camp held young activists and students accused of supporting the Chinese Communist Party, including more than 300 students from high schools and colleges. They were subjected to biweekly indoctrination in anti-communist ideology.

The operations of the Northwestern Youth Labor Camp were steadily expanded until 1944, when it was reorganized into the Northwestern Branch of the Youth Corps Training Center.
