= List of Australian penal colonies =

The following is a list of Australian penal colonies that existed from the establishment of European presence in the 1780s up until the nineteenth century. The term colony had referred to settlements and larger land areas at that time.

| Settlement | Colony | Year opened | Year closed |
|---|---|---|---|
| Cockatoo Island | New South Wales | 1839 | 1869 |
| Rose Hill | New South Wales | 1788 | |
| Sydney Cove | New South Wales | 1788 | 1840 |
| Moreton Bay | Queensland (New South Wales before 1859) | 1824 | |
| Redcliffe | Queensland | 1823 | 1824 |
| Maria Island | Van Diemen's Land (Note: Later renamed Tasmania) | 1825 | 1851 |
| Port Arthur | Van Diemen's Land | 1830 | |
| Richmond | Van Diemen's Land | 1830 | |
| Risdon Cove | Van Diemen's Land | 1794 | |
| Sarah Island, part of the Macquarie Harbour Penal Station | Van Diemen's Land | 1822 | 1833 |
| Saltwater River | Van Diemen's Land | 1879 | 1970 |
| Sullivans Cove | Van Diemen's Land | 1914 | |
| King George's Sound | Western Australia | 1826 | 1832 (Note: Convicts transferred back to Sydney) |
| Swan River Colony | Western Australia | 1850 | 1868 (Note: Last convict ship arrived 9 January 1868) |
| Norfolk Island | Other | 1788 | 1855 (Note: Except for an 11-year hiatus between 15 February 1814 and 6 June 1825) |
