= Penal treadmill =

Device in Victorian British prisons

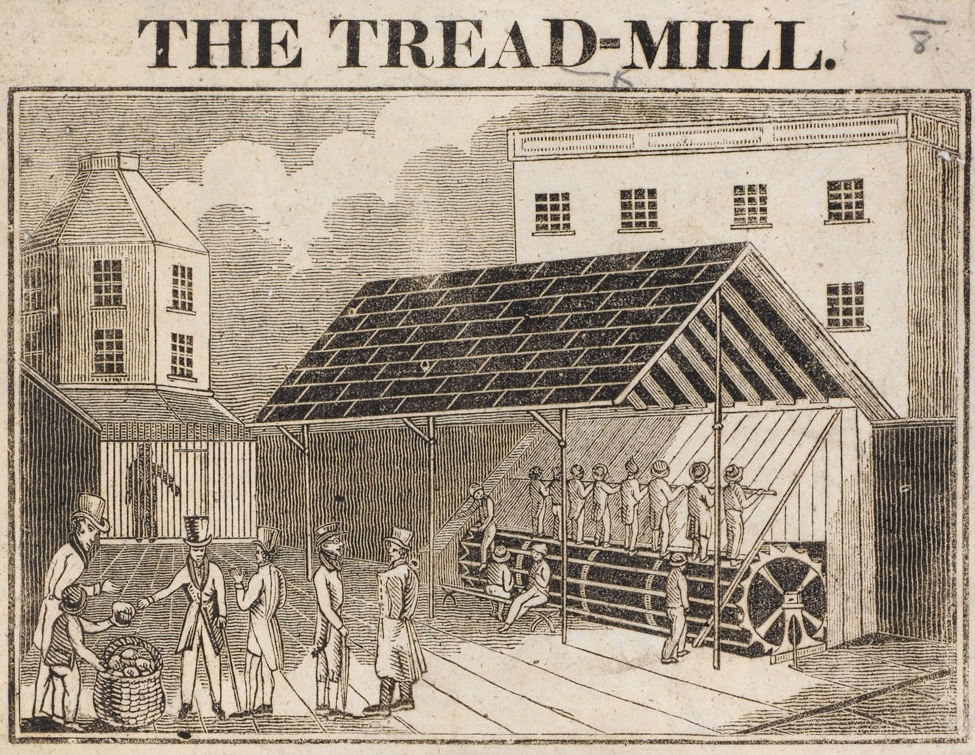
Treadmill at Brixton Prison in London designed by William Cubitt, c. 1817

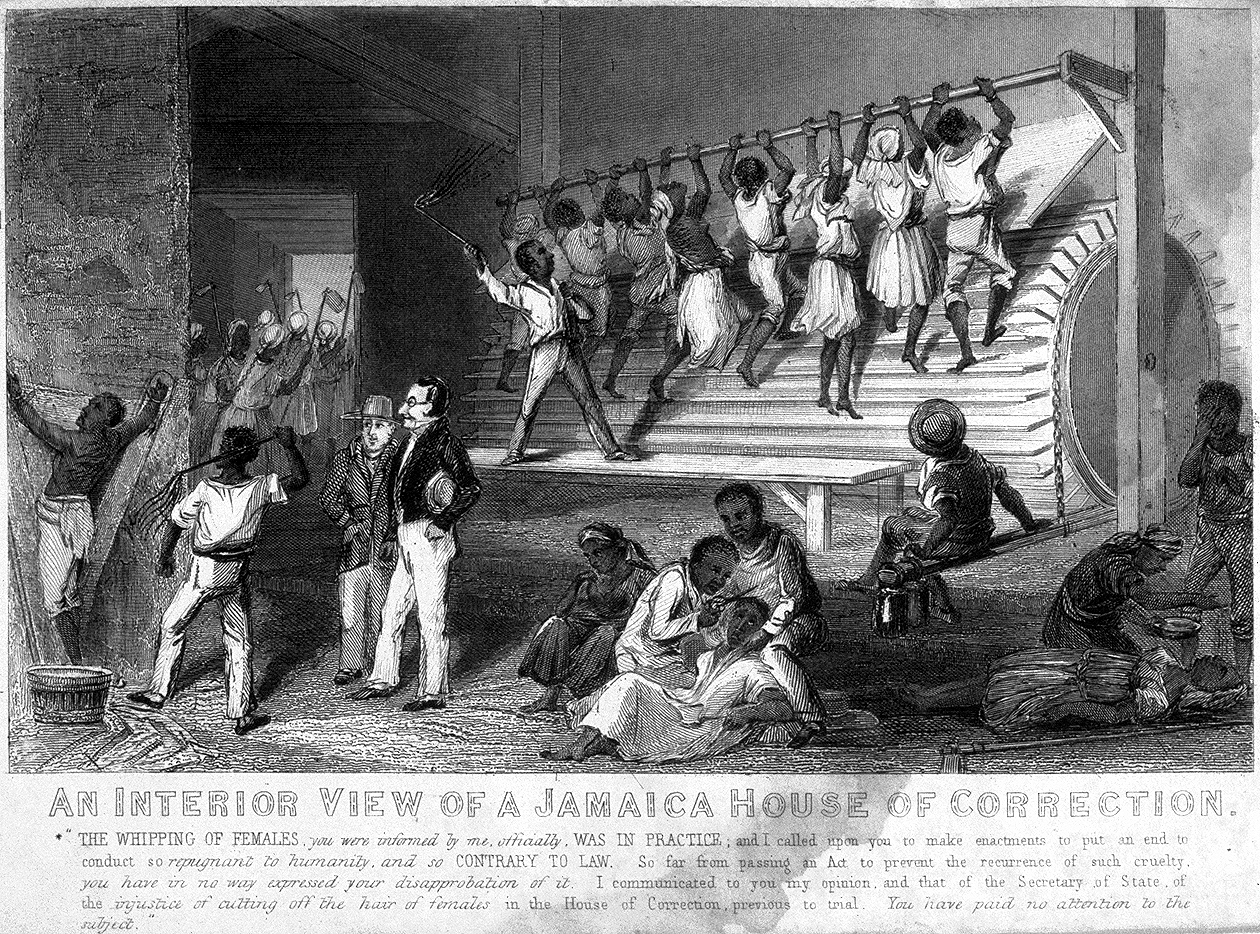
Penal Treadmill, Jamaica, c. 1837

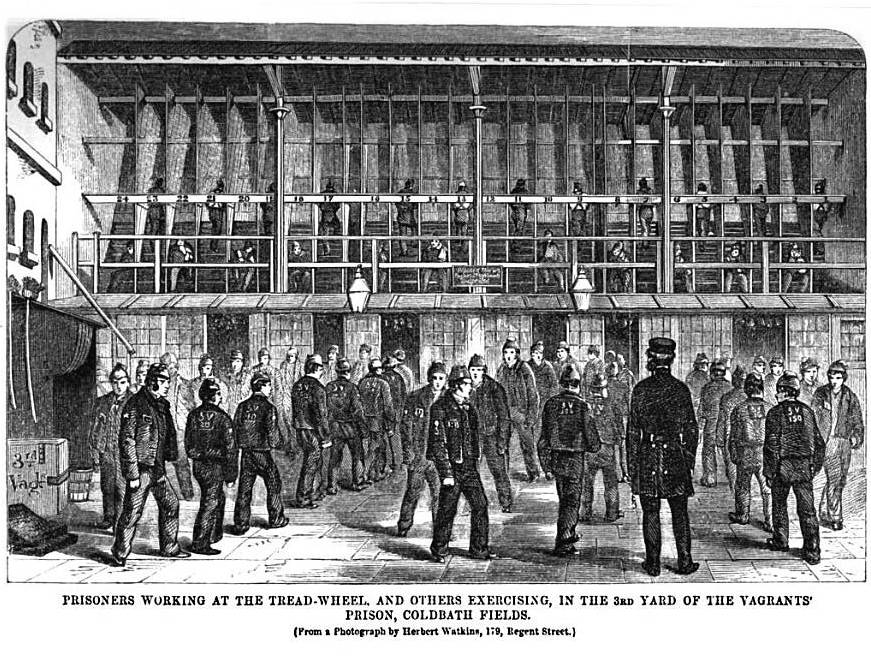
British penal treadwheel in Coldbath Fields Prison, 1864

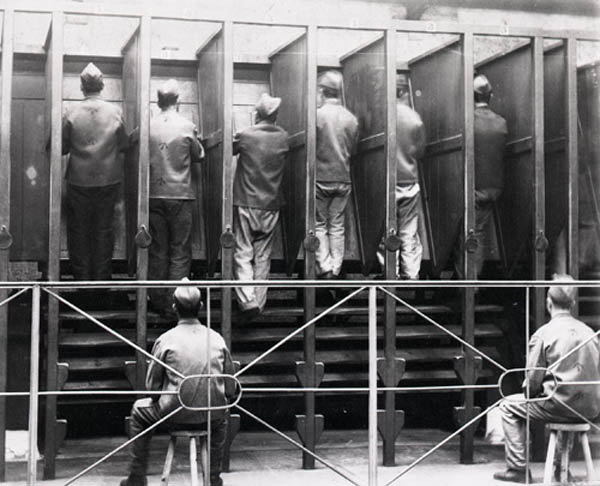
Pentonville Prison Treadmill, 1895

A penal treadmill (penal treadwheel or everlasting staircase) was a treadwheel or treadmill with steps set into two cast iron wheels. These drove a shaft that could be used to mill corn, pump water, or connect to a large fan for resistance.

Penal treadmills were used in prisons during the 19th century in Britain, India, and the United States. In early Victorian era Britain the treadmill was used as a method of exerting hard labour, a form of punishment prescribed in the prisoner's sentence. (Note: According to The Times in 1827, and reprinted in William Hone's Table-Book in 1838, the distance prisoners walked per day on average varied, from the equivalent of 6,600 vertical feet at Lewes to as much as 17,000 vertical feet in ten hours during the summertime at Warwick gaol.)

== History ==
The prison treadwheel was introduced in 1818 by the British engineer Sir William Cubitt (1785–1861) as a means of usefully occupying convicts in the prisons at Bury St Edmunds and Brixton. There had been simple two-person treadmills in prisons before, used for raising water and grain preparation; these were on a large scale and for a different purpose. Cubitt observed prisoners lying around in idleness and opined that it was better for "reforming offenders by teaching them habits of industry." It was intended to be pointless and to punish; straps and weights provided resistance to the motion. Later, when prison philosophy changed, using the energy to power pumps and corn mills became acceptable. 44 prisons in England adopted this form of hard labour to grind grain. Others remained "grinding the wind".

By the Prison Act 1865, every male prisoner over 16 sentenced to hard labour had to spend at least three months of his sentence in Labour Order. This consisted primarily of the treadmill or, as an alternative, the crank machine. This consisted of a small wheel, like the wheel of a paddle steamer, and a handle turned by the prisoner made it revolve in a box partially filled with gravel.

In 1895, there were 39 treadmills and 29 cranks in English prisons, which had diminished to 13 and 5, respectively, in 1901. The use of treadwheels was abolished in Britain in 1902 by the Prison Act 1898.

The United States adopted the treadwheel in 1822, installing one in Bellevue Hospital in New York City. A second was erected in 1823 for the cost of $3,000 at the Old New-Gate Prison in East Granby, Connecticut. Only four US prisons ever built treadwheels, and three of those quickly abandoned them.

== Description ==
The prison treadwheel was a long wooden cylinder with metal framing. It was initially about 6 feet (1.8 m) in diameter. On the exterior of the cylinder were wooden steps about 7.5 inches (19 cm) apart. As the prisoner put his weight on the step it depressed the wheel, and he was forced to step onto the step above; it was an "everlasting staircase". There would be 18 to 25 positions on the wheel, each separated by a wooden partition so each prisoner had no contact with the adjacent prisoner and saw only the wall in front. They walked in silence for six hours a day, taking 15 minutes on the wheel followed by a 5-minute break.

== In popular culture ==
On their 1977 album Storm Force Ten, folk-rock band Steeleye Span included an English folk song called "The Treadmill Song" describing a prisoner's lot at hard labour, including the treadmill. In Charles Dickens' novel A Christmas Carol Ebenezer Scrooge references the treadmill, which he describes as "useful", and in his novel Bleak House the lawyer Mr. Tulkinghorn threatens Hortense with imprisonment with treadmills "for women". The 1997 film Wilde shows Oscar Wilde put on the treadmill as part of his hard labour punishment. In 1959 it was mentioned by Clarice M. Carr in his Scandal at High Chimneys as part of the first act of "It is never too late to mend". Edward Guinness also threatens the company solicitor with treadmill punishment at the end of the second episode of the 2025 Netflix series House of Guinness.
