= Prison Act 1952 =

Act of the Parliament of the United Kingdom

Prison Act 1952 (Note: Section 55(1).)
- Act of Parliament
- Parliament of the United Kingdom
- Long title: An Act to consolidate certain enactments relating to prisons and other institutions for offenders and related matters with corrections and improvements made under the Consolidation of Enactments (Procedure) Act 1949.
- Citation: 15 & 16 Geo. 6 & 1 Eliz. 2. c. 52
- Territorial extent: England and Wales (Note: Section 55(3)–(5).)

Dates
- Royal assent: 30 October 1952
- Commencement: 1 October 1952 (Note: Section 55(2).)

Other legislation
- Amends: See § Repealed enactments
- Repeals/revokes: See § Repealed enactments
- Amended by: Mental Health Act 1959; Charities Act 1960; Criminal Justice Act 1967; National Loans Act 1968; Firearms Act 1968; Courts Act 1971; Criminal Justice Act 1972; Statute Law (Repeals) Act 1974; Statute Law (Repeals) Act 1975; Sex Discrimination Act 1975; Acquisition of Land Act 1981; Criminal Justice Act 1982; Criminal Justice Act 1991; Statute Law (Repeals) Act 1993; Immigration, Asylum and Nationality Act 2006; Police and Justice Act 2006; Offender Management Act 2007; Immigration Act 2014; Criminal Justice and Courts Act 2015; Immigration and Asylum Act 1999; Sentencing Act 2020; Sentencing Act 2026
- Relates to: Prisons (Scotland) Act 1952

Status: Amended

Text of statute as originally enacted

Revised text of statute as amended

Text of the Prison Act 1952 as in force today (including any amendments) within the United Kingdom, from legislation.gov.uk.

The Prison Act 1952 (15 & 16 Geo. 6 & 1 Eliz. 2. c. 52) is an act of the Parliament of the United Kingdom.

The act allows for the Secretary of State to make rules for the regulation and management of prisons, and for the classification, treatment, employment, discipline and control of persons required to be detained therein. The act itself is a consolidating act that repeals older legislation dating back to 1862, and forms the basis for prison law in the UK.

The Prisons (Scotland) Act 1952 (15 & 16 Geo. 6 & 1 Eliz. 2. c. 61) made equivalent provisions for Scotland.

== Provisions ==
=== Extent ===
The act does not apply to Northern Ireland at all, and does not apply to Scotland with the exception of some sections.

=== Repealed enactments ===
Section 54(2) of the act repealed 15 enactments, listed in the fourth schedule to the act.

Part I - Repealed not extending to Scotland
Session and Chapter	Short Title	Extent of Repeal
25 & 26 Vict. c. 44	Discharged Prisoners' Aid Act 1862	The whole act.
26 & 27 Vict. c. 79.	Prison Ministers Act 1863	The whole act.
28 & 29 Vict. c. 126	Prison Act 1865	The whole act.
34 & 35 Vict. c. 112	Prevention of Crimes Act 1871	In section six, paragraphs (b) and (7); in paragraph (10) the words from "in England "to "1865"; and in paragraph (12) the words from "The expenses incurred " to " accordingly ".
39 & 40 Vict. c. 23	Prevention of Crimes Amendment Act 1876	In section two the words " and photographing ".
40 & 41 Vict. c. 21	Prison Act 1877	The whole act.
44 & 45 Vict. c. 64	Central Criminal Court (Prisons) Act 1881	In section two, subsection (4) from the words " in manner provided " onwards
47 & 48 Vict. c. 51	Prison Act 1884	The whole act.
54 & 55 Vict. c. 69.	Penal Servitude Act 1891	Section eight.
61 & 62 Vict. c. 41.	Prison Act 1898	The whole act.
3 & 4 Geo. 5. c. 4.	Prisoners (Temporary Discharge for Ill-Health) Act 1913	The whole act.
4 & 5 Geo. 5. c. 58	Criminal Justice Administration Act 1914	Section seventeen.
11 & 12 Geo. 6. c. 58	Criminal Justice Act 1948	In section twenty, subsection (2).
11 & 12 Geo. 6. c. 58	Criminal Justice Act 1948	In section twenty-one, subsection (3).
11 & 12 Geo. 6. c. 58	Criminal Justice Act 1948	Section twenty-two, except subsection (1).
11 & 12 Geo. 6. c. 58	Criminal Justice Act 1948	Section forty-eight, except subsections (2) and (4).
11 & 12 Geo. 6. c. 58	Criminal Justice Act 1948	Sections fifty and fifty-one.
11 & 12 Geo. 6. c. 58	Criminal Justice Act 1948	In section fifty-two, in subsection (1) the words from "prisons" to "detention centres", and the words from " and Borstal institutions" to the end of the subsection; and subsections (3) to (5).
11 & 12 Geo. 6. c. 58	Criminal Justice Act 1948	Sections fifty-three to fifty-nine.
11 & 12 Geo. 6. c. 58	Criminal Justice Act 1948	The Second, Third, Fourth and Sixth Schedules.
11 & 12 Geo. 6. c. 58	Criminal Justice Act 1948	The Ninth Schedule so far as it amends the Prison Act, 1877.

Part II - Repeals extending to Scotland
Session and Chapter	Short Title	Extent of Repeal
11 & 12 Geo. 6. c. 58	Criminal Justice Act 1948	Sections sixty and sixty-one.
11 & 12 Geo. 6. c. 58	Criminal Justice Act 1948	Section sixty-five.
11 & 12 Geo. 6. c. 58	Criminal Justice Act 1948	Section eighty-one, so far as it relates to sections sixty, sixty-one and sixty-five and the Seventh Schedule.
11 & 12 Geo. 6. c. 58	Criminal Justice Act 1948	The Seventh Schedule.
12, 13 & 14 Geo. 6. c. 94	Criminal Justice (Scotland) Act 1949	The Eleventh Schedule, so far as it amends sections fifty-two, fifty-seven, sixty-one and sixty-five of the Criminal Justice Act, 1948.

== Subsequent developments ==
Section 54(2) of, and schedule 4 to, the act were repealed by section 1 of, and part XI of the schedule to, the Statute Law (Repeals) Act 1974, which came into force on 27 June 1974.
