= Prisoners (Temporary Discharge for Ill-Health) Act 1913 =

Act of the Parliament of the United Kingdom

Prisoners (Temporary Discharge for Ill-Health) Act 1913 (Note: Section 4.)
- Act of Parliament
- Parliament of the United Kingdom
- Long title: An Act to provide for the Temporary Discharge of Prisoners whose further detention in prison is undesirable on account of the condition of their Health.
- Citation: 3 & 4 Geo. 5. c. 4
- Territorial extent: United Kingdom (Note: Section 3.)

Dates
- Royal assent: 25 April 1913
- Commencement: 25 April 1913 (Note: The Acts of Parliament (Commencement) Act 1793.)
- Repealed: England and Wales: 1 October 1952; Scotland: 1 January 1953; Northern Ireland:
Other legislation
Amended by	Prison Act 1952; Prisons (Scotland) Act 1952
Repealed by	England and Wales: Prison Act 1952; Scotland: Prisons (Scotland) Act 1952; Northern Ireland: Prison Act (Northern Ireland) 1953

Status: Repealed

Text of statute as originally enacted

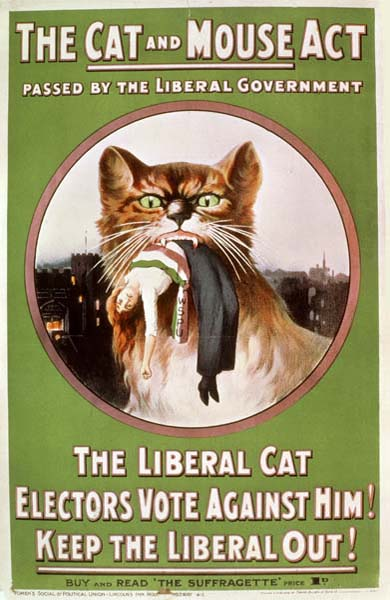
WSPU poster 1914 - Museum of London

The Prisoners (Temporary Discharge for Ill-Health) Act 1913 (3 & 4 Geo. 5. c. 4), commonly referred to as the Cat and Mouse Act, was an act of the Parliament of the United Kingdom passed under H. H. Asquith's Liberal government in 1913.

The act was passed as a response to members of the Women's Social and Political Union (WSPU, commonly referred to as suffragettes) utilising hunger strikes as a form of protest while they were imprisoned for acts of vandalism in support of women's suffrage. The hunger strikers were force-fed by the prison staff, leading to a public outcry. The act allowed the prisoners temporary release when their hunger strikes began to impair their health; they then had a predetermined period of time in which to recover after which they were rearrested and taken back to prison to serve out the rest of their sentence. Conditions could be placed on the prisoner during the time of their release. One effect of the act was to make hunger strikes technically legal. The nickname of the act came about because of the domestic cat's purported habit of playing with its prey, allowing it to temporarily escape a number of times, before killing it.

== Government use ==
After the act was introduced, force-feeding was no longer used to combat hunger strikes. Instead, suffragettes on hunger strike were kept in prison until they became extremely weak, at which point they would be temporarily released in order to recover. This effectively allowed the government to claim that it was not responsible for any harm (or even death) which might result from the starvation. During the recovery period, any law-breaking on the part of the suffragette would see them put straight back in prison.

The time spent out of prison recovering was not counted as time served towards the hunger strikers' prison sentences. Once deemed recovered, they would be recalled to prison to continue their sentence. This meant that suffragettes could be repeatedly released and imprisoned for the same offence, without a further trial.

== Background ==
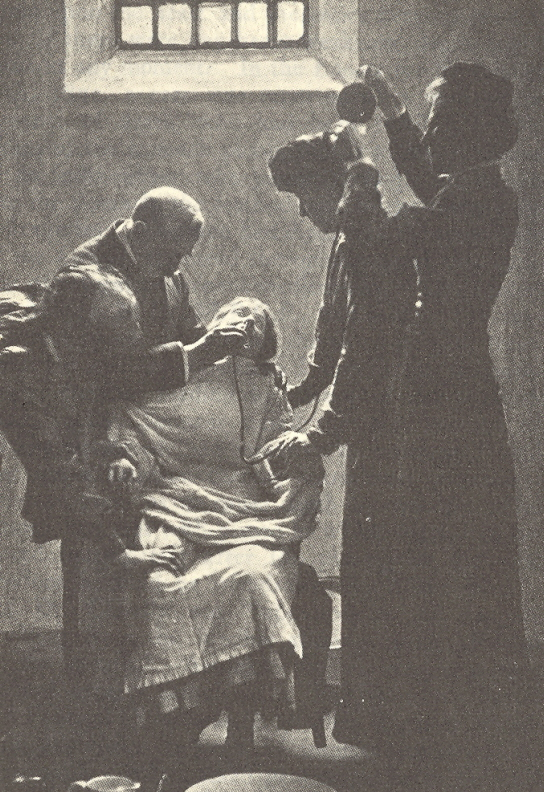
A suffragette being force-fed in Holloway prison, c. 1909

To attain the goal of suffrage on the same basis as men, the Women's Social and Political Union (WSPU, known colloquially as the suffragettes) engaged in acts of protest such as the breaking of windows, arson, and the "technical assault" (without causing harm) of police officers. Many WSPU members were jailed for these offences. In response to what the organisation viewed as brutal punishment and harsh treatment by the government at the time, imprisoned WSPU members embarked on a sustained campaign of hunger strikes. Some women were freed on taking this action, but this rendered the policy of imprisonment of suffragettes futile. The prison authorities then turned to a policy of force feeding hunger-strikers by nasogastric tube. Repeated uses of this process often caused sickness, which served the WSPU's aims of demonstrating the government's harsh treatment of the prisoners.

Faced with growing public disquiet over the tactic of force feeding, and the determination of the jailed suffragettes to continue their hunger strikes, the government rushed the act through Parliament. The effect of the act was to permit the release of prisoners for them to recuperate from the effects of a hunger strike whilst leaving the police free to re-imprison offenders once they had recovered. The intention of the act was to counter the tactic of hunger strikes and the damaging consequences for the government's support among (male) voters by the force feeding of women prisoners but, if anything, it reduced support for the Liberal government.

== Women writing about the experience of being forcibly fed ==
In a book called Suffrage and the Pankhursts, Jane Marcus argues that forcible feeding was the main image of the women's suffrage movement in the public imagination. Women wrote about how the experience made them feel in letters, diaries, speeches and suffrage publications, including Votes for Women and The Suffragette. One of the force-fed suffragettes, Lady Constance Lytton, wrote a book that suggested that working-class women were more likely to be forcibly fed in prison than upper-class women. In general, the medical procedure of force feeding was described as a physical and mental violation that caused pain, suffering, emotional distress, humiliation, anguish and rage.

Violet Bland also wrote in Votes for Women about her experiences of being force-fed, explaining how, "they twisted my neck, jerked my head back, closing my throat, held all the time as in a vice," while they tried to force feed her. She wrote how the guards were always six or seven to one and that, "there was really no possibility of the victim doing much in the way of protesting excepting verbally, to express one’s horror of it; therefore no excuse for the brutality shown on several occasions." At the end of what she describes as her assault, when she didn't get up from her chair quickly enough because of her "helpless and breathless condition," they snatched the chair from under her, throwing her to the floor. She wrote that she had no doubt the attacks were made with the intention of breaking the hunger-strikers down.

== Unintended consequences ==
The ineffectiveness of the act was very soon evident as the authorities experienced much more difficulty than anticipated in re-arresting the released hunger-strikers. Many of them eluded arrest with the help of a network of suffragette sympathisers and an all-women team of bodyguards, who employed tactics of misdirection, subterfuge and occasionally direct confrontation with the police. The inability of the government to lay its hands on high-profile suffragettes transformed what had been intended as a discreet device to control suffragette hunger-strikers into a public scandal.

This act was aimed at suppressing the power of the organisation by demoralising the activists, but turned out to be counter-productive as it undermined the moral authority of the government. The act was viewed as violating basic human rights, not only of the suffragettes but of other prisoners. The act's nickname of "Cat and Mouse Act", referring to the way the government seemed to play with prisoners as a cat might with a captured mouse, underlined how the cruelty of repeated releases and re-imprisonments turned the suffragettes from targets of scorn to objects of sympathy.

The Asquith government's implementation of the act caused the militant WSPU and the suffragettes to perceive Asquith as the enemy – an enemy to be vanquished in what the organisation saw as an all-out war. A related effect of this law was to increase support for the Labour Party, many of whose early founders supported voting rights for women. For example, the philosopher Bertrand Russell left the Liberal Party, and wrote pamphlets denouncing the act and the Liberals for making in his view an illiberal and anti-constitutional law. So the controversy helped to accelerate the decline in the Liberals' electoral position, as segments of the middle class began to defect to Labour.

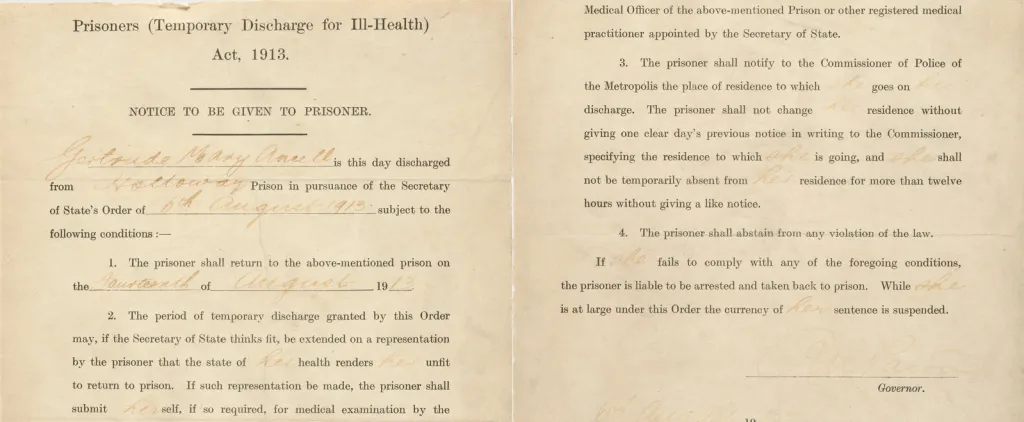
Gertrude Ansell's release under the Cat and Mouse act on 13 August 1913

The act also handed the WSPU an issue on which to campaign and rail against other parts of the British establishment, in particular the Church of England. During 1913, the WSPU directly targeted the Bishop of Winchester, Edward Talbot; the Archbishop of Canterbury, Randall Davidson; the Bishop of London, Arthur Winnington-Ingram; the Archbishop of York, Cosmo Gordon Lang, and the Bishops of Croydon, Lewes, Islington and Stepney. Each one was picketed by deputations at their official residences until granted an audience, during which the church leaders were asked to protest against forcible feeding. Norah Dacre Fox led many of the deputations on behalf of the WSPU, which were widely reported in The Suffragette. At one point, the Bishop of London was persuaded to visit Holloway personally in connection with allegations of female prisoners being poisoned during force feeding. The Bishop made several visits to the prison, but this came to nothing, and his public statements said that he could find no evidence of ill treatment during force feeding – indeed, he believed that force feeding was carried out "in the kindest possible spirit" – was seen by the WSPU as collusion with the government and prison authorities. If the WSPU had been hoping to win support from the church for their wider cause by pressing on the issue of forcible feeding, they were disappointed. The church chose not to be drawn into a battle between the WSPU and the authorities, and maintained the party line that militancy was a precursor to forcible feeding and militancy was against the will of God, therefore the church could not act against forcible feeding.

Research indicates that the act did little to deter the activities of the suffragettes. Their militant actions only ceased with the outbreak of war and their support for the war effort. However, the start of the war in August 1914, and the ending of all suffragette activities for the duration of the war, meant that the full potential impact of the Cat and Mouse Act will never be known.

== Subsequent developments ==
The whole act was repealed for England and Wales by section 54(2) of, and part I of the fourth schedule to, the Prison Act 1952 (15 & 16 Geo. 6 & 1 Eliz. 2. c. 52), which came into force on 1 October 1932.

The whole act was repealed for Scotland by section 43(2) of, and the fourth schedule to, the Prisons (Scotland) Act 1952 (15 & 16 Geo. 6 & 1 Eliz. 2. c. 61), which came into force on 1 January 1953.

In 2017 the Cat and Mouse Library opened in Islington, London. Its name recognises the sacrifices endured by suffragettes imprisoned in Holloway Prison, which was located nearby.

== See also ==
- History of feminism
