= Prisons (Scotland) Act 1952 =

Act of the Parliament of the United Kingdom

Prisons (Scotland) Act 1952 (Note: Section 44(1).)
- Act of Parliament
- Parliament of the United Kingdom
- Long title: An Act to consolidate certain enactments relating to prisons and other institutions for offenders in Scotland and related matters with corrections and improvements made under the Consolidation of Enactments (Procedure) Act, 1949.
- Citation: 15 & 16 Geo. 6 & 1 Eliz. 2. c. 61
- Territorial extent: Scotland (Note: Section 44(3).)

Dates
- Royal assent: 30 October 1952
- Commencement: 1 January 1953 (Note: Section 44(2).)
- Repealed: 16 February 1990
Other legislation
Amends	See § Repealed enactments
Repeals/revokes	See § Repealed enactments
Amended by	Mental Health (Scotland) Act 1960; Firearms Act 1968; Social Work (Scotland) Act 1968; Statute Law (Repeals) Act 1974; Fatal Accidents and Sudden Deaths Inquiry (Scotland) Act 1976; Law Reform (Miscellaneous Provisions) (Scotland) Act 1985
Repealed by	Prisons (Scotland) Act 1989
Relates to	Prison Act 1952

Status: Repealed

Text of statute as originally enacted

The Prisons (Scotland) Act 1952 (15 & 16 Geo. 6 & 1 Eliz. 2. c. 61) was an act of the Parliament of the United Kingdom that consolidated enactments related to prisons and other institutions for offenders in Scotland.

The Prison Act 1952 (15 & 16 Geo. 6 & 1 Eliz. 2. c. 52) made equivalent provisions for England and Wales..

== Provisions ==
=== Repealed enactments ===
Section 43(2) of the act repealed 13 enactments, listed in the fourth schedule to the act.

Citation	Short title	Extent of repeal
9 Geo. 4. c. 29	Circuit Courts (Scotland) Act 1828	Section twenty-five and Schedule D.
23 & 24 Vict. c. 105	Prisons (Scotland) Act 1860	The whole act.
26 & 27 Vict. c. 79	Prison Ministers Act 1863	The whole act.
26 & 27 Vict. c. 109	Prisoners Removal (Scotland) Act 1863	The whole act.
31 & 32 Vict. c. 95	Justiciary Court (Scotland) Act 1868	Section thirteen.
34 & 35 Vict. c. 112	Prevention of Crimes Act 1871	In section six, paragraphs (6) and (8); in paragraph (10) the words from "in Scotland" to "1860 and "; and in paragraph (12) the words from "The expenses incurred" to "accordingly".
39 & 40 Vict. c. 23	Prevention of Crimes Amendment Act 1876	In section two the words "and photographing".
40 & 41 Vict. c. 53	Prisons (Scotland) Act 1877	The whole act except sections one and sixty-six.
54 & 55 Vict. c. 69	Penal Servitude Act 1891	Section eight.
4 Edw. 7. c. 35	Prisons (Scotland) Act 1904	The whole act.
3 & 4 Geo. 5. c. 4	Prisoners (Temporary Discharge for Ill-Health) Act 1913	The whole act.
16 & 17 Geo. 5. c. 57	Prisons (Scotland) Act 1926	The whole act.
12, 13 & 14 Geo. 6. c. 94	Criminal Justice (Scotland) Act 1949	In section twenty, subsection (2). In section twenty-one, subsection (4). Section twenty-two except subsection (1). Section fifty except subsection (1). Section fifty-two except so far as relating to State Mental Hospitals. Sections fifty-three to sixty-two. Section sixty-six. In section seventy-four, subsection (2). The Fourth, Fifth, Sixth, Eighth and Ninth Schedules. The Eleventh Schedule so far as it amends the Prisons (Scotland) Act 1877.

== Subsequent developments ==
Section 43(2) of, and schedule 4 to, the act were repealed by section 1 of, and part XI of the schedule to, the Statute Law (Repeals) Act 1974, which came into force on 27 June 1974.

The whole act was repealed by section 45(2) of, and schedule 3 to, the Prisons (Scotland) Act 1989, which came into force on 16 February 1990.
