= List of acts of the Parliament of the United Kingdom from 1913 =

This is a complete list of acts of the Parliament of the United Kingdom for the year 1913.

Note that the first parliament of the United Kingdom was held in 1801; parliaments between 1707 and 1800 were either parliaments of Great Britain or of Ireland). For acts passed up until 1707, see the list of acts of the Parliament of England and the list of acts of the Parliament of Scotland. For acts passed from 1707 to 1800, see the list of acts of the Parliament of Great Britain. See also the list of acts of the Parliament of Ireland.

For acts of the devolved parliaments and assemblies in the United Kingdom, see the list of acts of the Scottish Parliament, the list of acts of the Northern Ireland Assembly, and the list of acts and measures of Senedd Cymru; see also the list of acts of the Parliament of Northern Ireland.

The number shown after each act's title is its chapter number. Acts passed before 1963 are cited using this number, preceded by the year(s) of the reign during which the relevant parliamentary session was held; thus the Union with Ireland Act 1800 is cited as "39 & 40 Geo. 3 c. 67", meaning the 67th act passed during the session that started in the 39th year of the reign of George III and which finished in the 40th year of that reign. Note that the modern convention is to use Arabic numerals in citations (thus "41 Geo. 3" rather than "41 Geo. III"). Acts of the last session of the Parliament of Great Britain and the first session of the Parliament of the United Kingdom are both cited as "41 Geo. 3". Acts passed from 1963 onwards are simply cited by calendar year and chapter number.

== 2 & 3 Geo. 5 ==
Continuing the second session of the 30th Parliament of the United Kingdom, which met from 14 February 1912 until 7 March 1913.

This session was also traditionally cited as 2 & 3 G. 5.

=== Public general acts ===
Short title	Citation	Royal assent
Long title
Agricultural Holdings Act 1913 (repealed)	2 & 3 Geo. 5. c. 21	14 February 1913
An Act to remove doubts as to the effect of subsection (2) of section forty-two of the Agricultural Holdings Act, 1908, (Note: Agricultural Holdings Act 1908 (8 Edw. 7. c. 28)) and the enactments re-enacted in that subsection. (Repealed by Agricultural Holdings Act 1923 (13 & 14 Geo. 5. c. 9))
Aerial Navigation Act 1913 (repealed)	2 & 3 Geo. 5. c. 22	14 February 1913
An Act to amend the Aerial Navigation Act, 1911. (Note: Aerial Navigation Act 1911 (1 & 2 Geo. 5. c. 4)) (Repealed by Air Navigation Act 1920 (10 & 11 Geo. 5. c. 80))
Clerks of Session (Scotland) Regulation Act 1913 (repealed)	2 & 3 Geo. 5. c. 23	7 March 1913
An Act to reduce the number of Principal Clerks of the Court of Session in Scotland. (Repealed by Administration of Justice (Scotland) Act 1933 (23 & 24 Geo. 5. c. 41))
Shops Act 1913 (repealed)	2 & 3 Geo. 5. c. 24	7 March 1913
An Act to amend the Shops Act, 1912, (Note: Shops Act 1912 (2 & 3 Geo. 5. c. 3)) in its application to premises for the sale of refreshments. (Repealed for England and Wales and Scotland by Shops Act 1950 (14 Geo. 6. c. 28) and for Northern Ireland by Shops Act (Northern Ireland) 1946 (c. 7 (N.I.)))
Tuberculosis Prevention (Ireland) Act 1913 (repealed)	2 & 3 Geo. 5. c. 25	7 March 1913
An Act to prevent the Spread and provide for the Treatment of Tuberculosis; and for other purposes connected therewith. (Repealed by Public Health (Tuberculosis) Act (Northern Ireland) 1946 (c. 6 (N.I.)))
Pensions (Governors of Dominions, &c.) Amendment Act 1913 (repealed)	2 & 3 Geo. 5. c. 26	7 March 1913
An Act to amend subsection (1) of section five of the Pensions (Governors of Dominions, &c.) Act, 1911, (Note: Pensions (Governors of Dominions, &c.) Act 1911 (1 & 2 Geo. 5. c. 24)) with respect to service in British Protectorates and other like service. (Repealed by Pensions (Governors of Dominions, &c.) Act 1929 (19 & 20 Geo. 5. c. 16))
Appropriation (1912-3) Act 1913 (repealed)	2 & 3 Geo. 5. c. 27	7 March 1913
An Act to apply a sum out of the Consolidated Fund to the service of the year ending on the thirty-first day of March one thousand nine hundred and thirteen, and to appropriate the Supplies granted in this Session of Parliament. (Repealed by Statute Law Revision Act 1927 (17 & 18 Geo. 5. c. 42))
Sheriff Courts (Scotland) Act 1913	2 & 3 Geo. 5. c. 28	7 March 1913
An Act to amend the Sheriff Courts (Scotland) Act, 1907. (Note: Sheriff Courts (Scotland) Act 1907 (7 Edw. 7. c. 51))
Railway and Canal Traffic Act 1913 (repealed)	2 & 3 Geo. 5. c. 29	7 March 1913
An Act to amend Section One of the Railway and Canal Traffic Act, 1894, (Note: Railway and Canal Traffic Act 1894 (57 & 58 Vict. c. 54)) with respect to increases of rates or charges made for the purpose of meeting a rise in the cost of working a railway due to improved labour conditions. (Repealed by Railways Act 1921 (11 & 12 Geo. 5. c. 55))
Trade Union Act 1913 (repealed)	2 & 3 Geo. 5. c. 30	7 March 1913
An Act to amend the Law with respect to the objects and powers of Trade Unions. (Repealed by Trade Union and Labour Relations (Consolidation) Act 1992 (c. 52))
Pilotage Act 1913 (repealed)	2 & 3 Geo. 5. c. 31	7 March 1913
An Act to consolidate and amend the Law relating to Pilotage. (Repealed for the United Kingdom by Pilotage Act 1983 (c. 21) and for the Isle of Man by Statute Law (Repeals) Act 1986 (c. 12))

=== Local acts ===
Short title	Citation	Royal assent
Long title
Kirkcaldy District Water Order Confirmation Act 1913 or the Kirkcaldy District Water Order Confirmation Act 1912 (repealed)	2 & 3 Geo. 5. c. clxix (Note: Local acts 2 & 3 Geo. 5. c. clxvii to c. clxviii and c. clxxi to c. clxxiii, although given royal assent in 1913, were given short titles for 1912. These acts are therefore listed under 1912.)	14 February 1913
An Act to confirm a Provisional Order under the Private Legislation Procedure (Scotland) Act 1899 (Note: Private Legislation Procedure (Scotland) Act 1899 (62 & 63 Vict. c. 47)) relating to Kirkcaldy District Water. (Repealed by Fife County Council Order Confirmation Act 1940 (3 & 4 Geo. 6. c. xliii))
	Kirkcaldy District Water Order 1913 Provisional Order to transfer to and vest in the County Council of the county of Fife and their Kirkcaldy District Committee certain powers conferred on the Wemyss and District Water Trustees by the Wemyss and District Water Order 1910 to authorise the said County Council and District Committee to exercise such powers and construct waterworks and supply water within their district and to empower the said County Council for such purposes to acquire lands and servitudes to levy assessments and borrow money and for other purposes.	

=== Sources ===
- The Public General Acts Passed in the Second and Third Years of the Reign of His Majesty King George V. 1912-13. H. M. Stationery Office. 1913 – via HathiTrust.

== 3 & 4 Geo. 5 ==
The third session of the 30th Parliament of the United Kingdom, which met from 10 March 1913 until 15 August 1913.

This session was also traditionally cited as 3 & 4 G. 5.

=== Public general acts ===
Short title	Citation	Royal assent
Long title
Consolidated Fund (No. 1) Act 1913 (repealed)	3 & 4 Geo. 5. c. 1	28 March 1913
An Act to apply a sum out of the Consolidated Fund to the service of the year ending on the thirty-first day of March one thousand nine hundred and fourteen. (Repealed by Statute Law Revision Act 1927 (17 & 18 Geo. 5. c. 42))
Army (Annual) Act 1913 (repealed)	3 & 4 Geo. 5. c. 2	25 April 1913
An Act to provide, during Twelve Months, for the Discipline and Regulation of the Army. (Repealed by Statute Law Revision Act 1927 (17 & 18 Geo. 5. c. 42) and Revision of the Army and Air Force Acts (Transitional Provisions) Act 1955 (3 & 4 Eliz. 2. c. 20))
Provisional Collection of Taxes Act 1913 (repealed)	3 & 4 Geo. 5. c. 3	25 April 1913
An Act to give statutory effect for a limited period to resolutions varying or renewing taxation, and to make provision with respect to payments and deductions made on account of any temporary tax between the dates of the expiration and renewal of the tax. (Repealed for England and Wales and Scotland by Provisional Collection of Taxes Act 1968 (c. 2) and for Northern Ireland by Statute Law Revision (Northern Ireland) Act 1976 (c. 12))
Prisoners (Temporary Discharge for Ill-Health) Act 1913 or the Cat and Mouse Act (repealed)	3 & 4 Geo. 5. c. 4	25 April 1913
An Act to provide for the Temporary Discharge of Prisoners whose further detention in prison is undesirable on account of the condition of their Health. (Repealed for England and Wales by Prison Act 1952 (15 & 16 Geo. 6 & 1 Eliz. 2. c. 52), for Scotland by Prisons (Scotland) Act 1952 (15 & 16 Geo. 6 & 1 Eliz. 2. c. 61) and for Northern Ireland by Prison Act (Northern Ireland) 1953 (c. 18 (N.I.)))
Consolidated Fund (No. 2) Act 1913 (repealed)	3 & 4 Geo. 5. c. 5	4 July 1913
An Act to apply a sum out of the Consolidated Fund to the service of the year ending on the thirty-first day of March one thousand nine hundred and fourteen. (Repealed by Statute Law Revision Act 1927 (17 & 18 Geo. 5. c. 42))
Extension of Polling Hours Act 1913 (repealed)	3 & 4 Geo. 5. c. 6	15 August 1913
An Act to extend the Hours of Polling at Parliamentary Elections. (Repealed by Representation of the People Act 1948 (11 & 12 Geo. 6. c. 65))
Children (Employment Abroad) Act 1913 (repealed)	3 & 4 Geo. 5. c. 7	15 August 1913
An Act to prohibit and restrict Children and Young Persons being taken out of the United Kingdom with a view to singing, playing, performing, or being exhibited, for profit. (Repealed by Children and Young Persons Act 1933 (23 & 24 Geo. 5. c. 12))
Crown Lands Act 1913 (repealed)	3 & 4 Geo. 5. c. 8	15 August 1913
An Act to authorise the execution of instruments on behalf of the Commissioners of Woods. (Repealed by Crown Lands Act 1927 (17 & 18 Geo. 5. c. 23))
Herring Fishery (Branding) Act 1913 (repealed)	3 & 4 Geo. 5. c. 9	15 August 1913
An Act to provide for the Branding of Barrels filled with Cured Herrings in England and Wales. (Repealed by Sea Fish Industry Act 1970 (c. 11))
Government of the Soudan Loan Act 1913 (repealed)	3 & 4 Geo. 5. c. 10	15 August 1913
An Act to authorise the Treasury to guarantee the Payment of Interest on a Loan to be raised by the Government of the Soudan. (Repealed by Government of the Soudan Loan Act 1919 (9 & 10 Geo. 5. c. 43))
Post Office Act 1913 (repealed)	3 & 4 Geo. 5. c. 11	15 August 1913
An Act to enable Newspapers published in British Possessions or Protectorates to be registered and be treated as Registered Newspapers under the Post Office Act, 1908. (Note: Post Office Act 1908 (8 Edw. 7. c. 48)) (Repealed by Post Office Act 1953 (1 & 2 Eliz. 2. c. 36))
Education (Scotland) Act 1913 (repealed)	3 & 4 Geo. 5. c. 12	15 August 1913
An Act to enable the provision of Medical Treatment for Children attending Schools in Scotland. (Repealed by Education (Scotland) Act 1945 (8 & 9 Geo. 6. c. 37))
Education (Scotland) (Glasgow Electoral Divisions) Act 1913 (repealed)	3 & 4 Geo. 5. c. 13	15 August 1913
An Act to divide the District of the School Board of Glasgow for Electoral Purposes. (Repealed by Education (Scotland) Act 1918 (8 & 9 Geo. 5. c. 48))
Public Buildings Expenses Act 1913 (repealed)	3 & 4 Geo. 5. c. 14	15 August 1913
An Act to amend section nine of the Finance Act, 1908. (Note: Finance Act 1908 (8 Edw. 7. c. 16)) (Repealed by Statute Law Revision Act 1958 (6 & 7 Eliz. 2. c. 46))
Expiring Laws Continuance Act 1913 (repealed)	3 & 4 Geo. 5. c. 15	15 August 1913
An Act to continue various Expiring Laws. (Repealed by Statute Law Revision Act 1927 (17 & 18 Geo. 5. c. 42))
Foreign Jurisdiction Act 1913	3 & 4 Geo. 5. c. 16	15 August 1913
An Act to amend the Foreign Jurisdiction Act, 1890. (Note: Foreign Jurisdiction Act 1890 (53 & 54 Vict. c. 37))
Fabrics (Misdescription) Act 1913 (repealed)	3 & 4 Geo. 5. c. 17	15 August 1913
An Act to prevent the Misdescription of Fabrics. (Repealed by Consumer Protection Act 1987 (c. 43))
Isle of Man (Customs) Act 1913 (repealed)	3 & 4 Geo. 5. c. 18	15 August 1913
An Act to amend the Law with respect to Customs in the Isle of Man. (Repealed by Statute Law Revision Act 1927 (17 & 18 Geo. 5. c. 42))
Local Government (Adjustments) Act 1913 (repealed)	3 & 4 Geo. 5. c. 19	15 August 1913
An Act to extend and amend the Law relating to the Adjustment of Financial Relations between Local Government Areas on the Alteration of the Boundaries thereof or other change in relation to which the adjustment takes place. (Repealed by Statute Law (Repeals) Act 1975 (c. 10))
Bankruptcy (Scotland) Act 1913	3 & 4 Geo. 5. c. 20	15 August 1913
An Act to consolidate and amend the Laws relating to Bankruptcy in Scotland.
Appellate Jurisdiction Act 1913 (repealed)	3 & 4 Geo. 5. c. 21	15 August 1913
An Act to make further provision with respect to the number and duties of Lords of Appeal in Ordinary, and with respect to the constitution of the Court of Appeal and the Judicial Committee of the Privy Council. (Repealed by Supreme Court of Judicature (Consolidation) Act 1925 (15 & 16 Geo. 5. c. 49), Statute Law Revision Act 1927 (17 & 18 Geo. 5. c. 42), South Africa Act 1962 (c. 23), Judges' Remuneration Act 1965 (c. 61) and Administration of Justice Act 1968 (c. 5))
Public Works Loans Act 1913 (repealed)	3 & 4 Geo. 5. c. 22	15 August 1913
An Act to grant Money for the purpose of certain Local Loans out of the Local Loans Fund, and for other purposes relating to Local Loans. (Repealed by Statute Law Revision Act 1927 (17 & 18 Geo. 5. c. 42))
Public Health (Prevention and Treatment of Disease) Act 1913 (repealed)	3 & 4 Geo. 5. c. 23	15 August 1913
An Act to amend the Law relating to Public Health as respects the Prevention and Treatment of Disease. (Repealed by Public Health Act 1936 (26 Geo. 5 & 1 Edw. 8. c. 49) and Public Health (London) Act 1936 (26 Geo. 5 & 1 Edw. 8. c. 50))
Telegraph (Money) Act 1913 (repealed)	3 & 4 Geo. 5. c. 24	15 August 1913
An Act to provide for raising further Money for the purpose of the Telegraph Acts, 1863 to 1911. (Repealed by Statute Law Revision Act 1953 (2 & 3 Eliz. 2. c. 5))
Companies Act 1913 (repealed)	3 & 4 Geo. 5. c. 25	15 August 1913
An Act to amend the provisions of the Companies (Consolidation) Act, 1908, (Note: Companies (Consolidation) Act 1908 (8 Edw. 7. c. 69)) with respect to private Companies. (Repealed for England and Wales and Scotland by Companies Act 1929 (19 & 20 Geo. 5. c. 23) and for Northern Ireland by Companies Act (Northern Ireland) 1932 (22 & 23 Geo. 5. c. 7 (N.I.)))
Highlands and Islands (Medical Service) Grant Act 1913 (repealed)	3 & 4 Geo. 5. c. 26	15 August 1913
An Act to provide a Special Grant for the purpose of improving Medical Service in the Highlands and Islands of Scotland, and for other purposes connected therewith. (Repealed by National Health Service (Scotland) Act 1947 (10 & 11 Geo. 6. c. 27))
Forgery Act 1913 (repealed)	3 & 4 Geo. 5. c. 27	15 August 1913
An Act to consolidate, simplify, and amend the Law relating to Forgery and kindred Offences. (Repealed by Forgery and Counterfeiting Act 1981 (c. 45))
Mental Deficiency Act 1913 (repealed)	3 & 4 Geo. 5. c. 28	15 August 1913
An Act to make further and better provision for the care of Feeble-minded and other Mentally Defective Persons and to amend the Lunacy Acts. (Repealed by Mental Health Act 1959 (7 & 8 Eliz. 2. c. 72))
Intermediate Education (Ireland) Act 1913 (repealed)	3 & 4 Geo. 5. c. 29	15 August 1913
An Act to amend the Law relating to Intermediate Education in Ireland. (Repealed by Education Act (Northern Ireland) 1923 (13 & 14 Geo. 5. c. 21 (N.I.)))
Finance Act 1913 (repealed)	3 & 4 Geo. 5. c. 30	15 August 1913
An Act to continue the Duty of Customs on Tea, and to re-impose Income Tax (including super-tax), and to apply with respect to Income Tax (including super-tax) and the annual value of property the like provisions as were applied in the last preceding year. (Repealed by Income Tax Act 1918 (8 & 9 Geo. 5. c. 40) and Statute Law Revision Act 1927 (17 & 18 Geo. 5. c. 42))
Industrial and Provident Societies (Amendment) Act 1913 (repealed)	3 & 4 Geo. 5. c. 31	15 August 1913
An Act to amend the Industrial and Provident Societies Act, 1893. (Note: Industrial and Provident Societies Act 1893 (56 & 57 Vict. c. 39)) (Repealed for England and Wales and Scotland by Industrial and Provident Societies Act 1965 (c. 12) and for Northern Ireland by Industrial and Provident Societies Act (Northern Ireland) 1969 (c. 24 (N.I.)))
Ancient Monuments Consolidation and Amendment Act 1913 (repealed)	3 & 4 Geo. 5. c. 32	15 August 1913
An Act to consolidate and amend the Law relating to Ancient Monuments and for other purposes in connection therewith. (Repealed by Ancient Monuments and Archaeological Areas Act 1979 (c. 46))
Temperance (Scotland) Act 1913 (repealed)	3 & 4 Geo. 5. c. 33	15 August 1913
An Act to promote Temperance in Scotland by conferring on the electors in prescribed areas control over the grant and renewal of certificates; by securing a later hour of opening for licensed premises; by amending the law relating to clubs; and by other provisions incidental thereto. (Repealed by Licensing (Scotland) Act 1959 (7 & 8 Eliz. 2. c. 51))
Bankruptcy and Deeds of Arrangement Act 1913 (repealed)	3 & 4 Geo. 5. c. 34	15 August 1913
An Act to amend the Law with respect to Bankruptcy and Deeds of Arrangement. (Repealed by Statute Law (Repeals) Act 1989 (c. 43))
Appropriation Act 1913 (repealed)	3 & 4 Geo. 5. c. 35	15 August 1913
An Act to apply certain sums out of the Consolidated Fund to the service of the years ending on the thirty-first day of March one thousand nine hundred and twelve and one thousand nine hundred and fourteen, and to appropriate the Supplies granted in this Session of Parliament. (Repealed by Statute Law Revision Act 1927 (17 & 18 Geo. 5. c. 42))
Bishoprics of Sheffield, Chelmsford, and for the County of Suffolk Act 1913 (repealed)	3 & 4 Geo. 5. c. 36	15 August 1913
An Act to provide for the foundation of Bishoprics of Sheffield, Chelmsford, and of another diocese to be formed of such parts of the dioceses of Ely and Norwich as are situate within the County of Suffolk, and for other matters incidental thereto. (Repealed by Statute Law (Repeals) Act 1973 (c. 39))
National Insurance Act 1913 (repealed)	3 & 4 Geo. 5. c. 37	15 August 1913
All Act to amend Parts I. and III. of the National Insurance Act, 1911. (Note: National Insurance Act 1911 (1 & 2 Geo. 5. c. 55)) (Repealed by National Health Insurance Act 1924 (14 & 15 Geo. 5. c. 38), Local Government (Scotland) Act 1929 (19 & 20 Geo. 5. c. 25), National Health Insurance Act 1936 (26 Geo. 5 & 1 Edw. 8. c. 32), Public Health Act 1936 (26 Geo. 5 & 1 Edw. 8. c. 49) (Note: Incorrectly cited as "1936 c 39" in the Chronological Table of the Statutes.), Local Government (Scotland) Act 1947 (10 & 11 Geo. 6. c. 43) and Public Health etc. (Scotland) Act 2008 (Commencement No. 2, Savings and Consequential Provisions) Order 2009 (SSI 2009/319))
Mental Deficiency and Lunacy (Scotland) Act 1913 (repealed)	3 & 4 Geo. 5. c. 38	15 August 1913
An Act to make better and further provision for the care of Mentally Defective Persons and to amend the Law relating to Lunacy in Scotland. (Repealed by Mental Health (Scotland) Act 1960 (8 & 9 Eliz. 2. c. 61))

=== Local acts ===
Short title	Citation	Royal assent
Long title
Edinburgh and East of Scotland College of Agriculture Order Confirmation Act 1913	3 & 4 Geo. 5. c. i	25 April 1913
An Act to confirm a Provisional Order under the Private Legislation Procedure (Scotland) Act 1899 (Note: Private Legislation Procedure (Scotland) Act 1899 (62 & 63 Vict. c. 47)) relating to the Edinburgh and East of Scotland College of Agriculture.
	Edinburgh and East of Scotland College of Agriculture Order 1913 Provisional Order for enabling the Edinburgh and East of Scotland College of Agriculture to acquire compulsorily certain lands in the city of Edinburgh and for other purposes.	
Crowborough District Gas and Electricity Act 1913 (repealed)	3 & 4 Geo. 5. c. ii	4 July 1913
An Act to confer further powers on the Crowborough District Gas Company in reference to their gas undertaking and to empower them to supply electricity within their existing limits of supply. (Repealed by Tunbridge Wells Gas Order 1929 (SR&O 1929/346))
Harrow and Stanmore Gas Act 1913	3 & 4 Geo. 5. c. iii	4 July 1913
An Act to authorise the Harrow and Stanmore Gas Company to consolidate their existing capital to raise additional capital to construct new works and for other purposes.
Governesses Benevolent Institution Act 1913 (repealed)	3 & 4 Geo. 5. c. iv	4 July 1913
An Act to amend the Charter and enlarge the powers of the Governesses Benevolent Institution. (Repealed by Governesses Benevolent Institution Act 1952 (15 & 16 Geo. 6 & 1 Eliz. 2. c. xxx))
Cleveland and Durham County Electric Power Act 1913	3 & 4 Geo. 5. c. v	4 July 1913
An Act to confer further powers upon the Cleveland and Durham County Electric Power Company and for other purposes.
Swansea Harbour Act 1913	3 & 4 Geo. 5. c. vi	4 July 1913
An Act for conferring further powers upon the Swansea Harbour Trustees.
Colne Corporation Act 1913 (repealed)	3 & 4 Geo. 5. c. vii	4 July 1913
An Act to enable the mayor aldermen and burgesses of the borough of Colne to acquire the undertaking of the Colne and Trawden Light Railways Company and for other purposes. (Repealed by County of Lancashire Act 1984 (c. xxi))
Colonial and Foreign Banks Guarantee Corporation Act 1913	3 & 4 Geo. 5. c. viii	4 July 1913
An Act to amend the Colonial and Foreign Banks Guarantee Fund Incorporation Act 1899 (Note: Colonial and Foreign Banks Guarantee Fund Incorporation Act 1899 (62 & 63 Vict. c. lxv)) and for other purposes.
Northern Counties Electricity Supply Company Act 1913	3 & 4 Geo. 5. c. ix	4 July 1913
An Act to transfer to the Northern Counties Electricity Supply Company Limited the undertakings authorised by the Hebburn Electric Lighting Order 1900 and the Felling Electric Lighting Order 1901 and for other purposes.
Herne Bay Gas and Electricity Act 1913	3 & 4 Geo. 5. c. x	4 July 1913
An Act to confer powers upon the Herne Bay Gas and Coke Company Limited for the supply of electricity and for other purposes.
Dundee Corporation (Improvements and Tramways) Act 1913 (repealed)	3 & 4 Geo. 5. c. xi	4 July 1913
An Act for the improvement of the city and royal burgh of Dundee and the widening alteration improvement and extension of existing streets and thoroughfares and the construction of new roads or streets and tramways and for other purposes. (Repealed by Dundee Corporation (Consolidated Powers) Order Confirmation Act 1957 (6 & 7 Eliz. 2. c. iv))
Cambrian Railways Act 1913	3 & 4 Geo. 5. c. xii	4 July 1913
An Act for conferring further powers upon the Cambrian Railways Company and the Welshpool and Llanfair Light Railway Company for amalgamating the Vale of Rheidol (Light) Railway Company with the Cambrian Railways Company and for other purposes.
Isle of Wight Central Railway (Godshill Transfer) Act 1913	3 & 4 Geo. 5. c. xiii	4 July 1913
An Act for transferring to and vesting in the Isle of Wight Central Railway Company the undertaking of the Newport Godshill and St. Lawrence Railway Company to confer further powers on the Isle of Wight Central Railway Company and for other purposes.
Porthcawl and District Gas Act 1913	3 & 4 Geo. 5. c. xiv	4 July 1913
An Act to dissolve and reincorporate the Porthcawl Gas Light and Coke Company Limited to enable the Company to supply gas to and within the urban district of Porthcawl and other parishes and places in the county of Glamorgan and for other purposes.
Northampton Corporation Water Act 1913	3 & 4 Geo. 5. c. xv	4 July 1913
An Act to empower the corporation of Northampton to construct additional waterworks to make better provision with regard to their water undertaking and for other purposes.
South Staffordshire Mond Gas (Power and Heating) Company Act 1913	3 & 4 Geo. 5. c. xvi	4 July 1913
An Act to confer further powers upon the South Staffordshire Mond Gas (Power and Heating) Company.
South Staffordshire Waterworks Act 1913	3 & 4 Geo. 5. c. xvii	4 July 1913
An Act to authorise the South Staffordshire Waterworks Company to construct new works and for other purposes.
Slough Gas Act 1913	3 & 4 Geo. 5. c. xviii	4 July 1913
An Act to empower the Slough Gas and Coke Company to convert its capital into stock and for other purposes.
Bishop's Waltham Water Act 1913	3 & 4 Geo. 5. c. xix	4 July 1913
An Act for transferring and vesting the undertaking of the Bishop's Waltham Waterworks Company Limited to and in the South Hants Waterworks Company and for other purposes.
Humber Commercial Railway and Dock Act 1913	3 & 4 Geo. 5. c. xx	4 July 1913
An Act to authorise the Humber Commercial Railway and Dock Company to make embankments in the River Humber at the entrance to Immingham Dock and for other purposes.
Manchester Royal Exchange Act 1913	3 & 4 Geo. 5. c. xxi	4 July 1913
An Act to enable the Manchester Royal Exchange Limited to acquire lands for the extension of and to extend the Royal Exchange and for other purposes.
Mynyddislwyn Urban District Council Act 1913	3 & 4 Geo. 5. c. xxii	4 July 1913
An Act to empower the Urban District Council of Mynyddislwyn to purchase the gas undertakings and to supply gas within the Sirhowy Valley portion of their district to make further provision in regard to the improvement and local government of the district and for other purposes.
Local Government Board's Provisional Orders Confirmation (No. 1) Act 1913	3 & 4 Geo. 5. c. xxiii	4 July 1913
An Act to confirm certain Provisional Orders of the Local Government Board relating to Aylesbury Bury Chorley Filey Kiveton Park (Rural) Neath Newton in Mackerfield and Watford.
	Aylesbury Order 1913 Provisional Order to enable the Urban District Council of Aylesbury to put in force the Compulsory Clauses of the Lands Clauses Acts.	
	Bury Order 1913 Provisional Order for partially repealing and altering the Bury and District Water (Transfer) Act 1900 (Note: Bury and District Water (Transfer) Act 1900 (63 & 64 Vict. c. cxliv)) and the Bury Corporation Act 1909. (Note: Bury Corporation Act 1909 (9 Edw. 7. c. clix))	
	Chorley Order 1913 Provisional Order for altering the Chorley Improvement Act 1871 (Note: Chorley Improvement Act 1871 (34 & 35 Vict. c. lxvi)) and the Local Government Board's Provisional Orders Confirmation (No. 5) Act 1907. (Note: Local Government Board's Provisional Orders Confirmation (No. 5) Act 1907 (7 Edw. 7. c. clv))	
	Filey Order 1913 Provisional Order for altering the Filey Water and Gas Act 1898. (Note: Filey Water and Gas Act 1898 (61 & 62 Vict. c. ccxxx))	
	Kiveton Park Rural Order 1913 Provisional Order for dissolving the Fir Vale Special Drainage District.	
	Neath Order 1913 Provisional Order for altering the Neath Corporation Gas Act 1874 (Note: Neath Corporation Gas Act 1874 (37 & 38 Vict. c. c)) and the Local Government Board's Provisional Orders Confirmation (No. 4) Act 1893. (Note: Local Government Board's Provisional Orders Confirmation (No. 4) Act 1893 (56 & 57 Vict. c. cxv))	
	Newton in Mackerfield Order 1913 Provisional Order for altering the Newton District Improvement Act 1855 (Note: Newton District Improvement Act 1855 (18 & 19 Vict. c. c)) and the Local Government Board's Provisional Orders Confirmation (No. 9) Act 1893. (Note: Local Government Board's Provisional Orders Confirmation (No. 9) Act 1893 (56 & 57 Vict. c. cxvii))	
	Watford Order 1913 Provisional Order for partially repealing the Watford Urban District Council Act 1909. (Note: Watford Urban District Council Act 1909 (9 Edw. 7. c. lxxxviii))	
Local Government Board's Provisional Order Confirmation (No. 2) Act 1913	3 & 4 Geo. 5. c. xxiv	4 July 1913
An Act to confirm a Provisional Order of the Local Government Board relating to the County of Southampton.
	County of Southampton Order 1913 Provisional Order made in pursuance of subsection (2) of Section 69 of the Local Government Act 1888. (Note: Local Government Act 1888 (51 & 52 Vict. c. 41))	
Local Government Board's Provisional Orders Confirmation (No. 3) Act 1913	3 & 4 Geo. 5. c. xxv	4 July 1913
An Act to confirm certain Provisional Orders of the Local Government Board relating to Ashton-in-Makerfield Harrogate Rochdale Stratford-upon-Avon Swansea and Ulverston and the Epsom (Rural) Sutton Carshalton and Leatherhead and the Sittingbourne and Milton Joint Hospital Districts.
	Ashton-in-Makerfield Order 1913 Provisional Order for altering the Ashton-in-Makerfield Local Board Act 1875 (Note: Ashton-in-Makerfield Local Board Act 1875 (38 & 39 Vict. c. xxxviii)) and the Local Government Board's Provisional Orders Confirmation (No. 5) Act 1899. (Note: Local Government Board's Provisional Orders Confirmation (No. 5) Act 1899 (62 & 63 Vict. c. cx))	
	Harrogate Order 1913 Provisional Order for altering the Harrogate Improvement Act 1841 (Note: Harrogate Improvement Act 1841 (4 & 5 Vict. c. xvi)) the Harrogate Corporation Act 1893 (Note: Harrogate Corporation Act 1893 (56 & 57 Vict. c. ccix)) and a Confirming Act. (Note: Local Government (No. 6) Act 1868 (31 & 32 Vict. c. cliii))	
	Rochdale Order 1913 Provisional Order for altering the Rochdale Improvement Act 1872. (Note: Rochdale Improvement Act 1872 (35 & 36 Vict. c. cxlix))	
	Stratford-upon-Avon Order 1913 Provisional Order for altering the Stratford-upon-Avon Borough Act 1879. (Note: Stratford-upon-Avon Borough Act 1879 (42 & 43 Vict. c. cxix))	
	Swansea Order 1913 Provisional Order for altering certain Local Acts (Note: Swansea Corporation Loans Act 1881 (44 & 45 Vict. c. cvii)) (Note: Swansea Corporation Loans Act 1882 (45 & 46 Vict. c. ccxxxviii)) (Note: Swansea Corporation Water Act 1892 (55 & 56 Vict. c. cxxxiii)) and a Confirming Act. (Note: Local Government Board's Provisional Orders Confirmation (No. 14) Act 1903 (3 Edw. 7. c. lxxx))	
	Ulverston Order 1913 Provisional Order for altering the Ulverston Local Board Act 1874. (Note: Ulverston Local Board Act 1874 (37 & 38 Vict. c. cliv))	
	Epsom (Rural), Sutton, Carshalton and Leatherhead Joint Hospital Order 1913 Provisional Order for altering certain Confirming Acts. (Note: Local Government Board's Provisional Orders Confirmation (No. 5) Act 1893 (56 & 57 Vict. c. cxvi)) (Note: Local Government Board's Provisional Orders Confirmation (No. 7) Act 1896 (59 & 60 Vict. c. cii))	
	Sittingbourne and Milton Joint Hospital Order 1913 Provisional Order for altering a Confirming Act. (Note: Local Government Board's Provisional Orders Confirmation (Castleton-by-Rochdale, &c.) Act 1879 (42 & 43 Vict. c. lxxxvi))	
Land Drainage (Holme St. Cuthbert) Provisional Order Confirmation Act 1913 (repealed)	3 & 4 Geo. 5. c. xxvi	4 July 1913
An Act to confirm a Provisional Order under the Land Drainage Act 1861 (Note: Land Drainage Act 1861 (24 & 25 Vict. c. 133)) in the matter of the proposed drainage district in the Parishes of Holme St. Cuthbert Allonby and West Newton in the County of Cumberland. (Repealed by Statute Law (Repeals) Act 1993 (c. 50))
	In the matter of a proposed Drainage District in the Parishes of Holme St. Cuthbert Allonby and West Newton in the County of Cumberland.	
Burgh and Parochial Schoolmasters' Widows' Fund (Scotland) Order Confirmation Act 1913	3 & 4 Geo. 5. c. xxvii	4 July 1913
An Act to confirm a Provisional Order under the Private Legislation Procedure (Scotland) Act 1899 relating to the Burgh and Parochial Schoolmasters' Widows' Fund (Scotland).
	Burgh and Parochial Schoolmasters' Widows' Fund (Scotland) Order 1913 Provisional Order to repeal an Act passed in the ninth and tenth year of the reign of Her late Majesty Queen Victoria (Note: Parish Schoolmasters' Dependents (Scotland) Act 1846 (9 & 10 Vict. c. ccxxvi)) for better raising and more securely constituting the Fund for the Relief of Widows and Children of Burgh and Parochial Schoolmasters in Scotland to constitute the said Fund more securely to regulate the future management administration and application of the Fund to confer powers for the winding-up of the Fund and for other purposes.	
St. Andrews Burgh Extension and Links Order Confirmation Act 1913	3 & 4 Geo. 5. c. xxviii	4 July 1913
An Act to confirm a Provisional Order under the Private Legislation Procedure (Scotland) Act 1899 relating to St. Andrews Burgh Extension and Links/
	St. Andrews Burgh Extension and Links Order 1913 Provisional Order to extend the boundaries of the burgh of St. Andrews in the county of Fife to authorise and confirm the construction of a conduit or line of pipes to abandon certain authorised works to authorise the borrowing of additional money to regulate manage and maintain the links of St. Andrews and the golf courses thereon to make and confirm an agreement between the Town Council of St. Andrews and the Royal and Ancient Golf Club of St. Andrews to levy charges and for other purposes.	
Caledonian Railway Order Confirmation Act 1913	3 & 4 Geo. 5. c. xxix	4 July 1913
An Act to confirm a Provisional Order under the Private Legislation Procedure (Scotland) Act 1899 relating to the Caledonian Railway.
	Caledonian Railway Order 1913 Provisional Order to confer further powers on the Caledonian Railway Company in relation to their undertaking to extend the periods for the completion of railways and other works and for the purchase of lands to transfer to the Company the undertaking of the Bankfoot Light Railway Company to authorise the Callander and Oban Railway Company to hold and dispose of superfluous lands to confirm an agreement between the Corporation of Edinburgh the Company and the North British Railway Company relative to the Gorgie Markets Branch Railways and for other purposes.	
Redcar, Coatham, Marske and Saltburn Gas Act 1913	3 & 4 Geo. 5. c. xxx	15 August 1913
An Act to authorise the Redcar Coatham Marske and Saltburn Gas Company to construct additional works and for other purposes.
Lymm Urban District Council Act 1913	3 & 4 Geo. 5. c. xxxi	15 August 1913
An Act to authorise the Urban District Council of Lymm to purchase the undertaking of the Lymm Water Company and certain properties of the Lymm Estate Development Company Limited and to supply water within their urban district and the neighbourhood to confer further powers upon them in regard to their gas undertaking and to make further provision for the health local government and improvement of the district and for other purposes.
Swanage Urban District Water Act 1913	3 & 4 Geo. 5. c. xxxii	15 August 1913
An Act to transfer to and vest in the Swanage Urban District Council the water undertaking of the Swanage Gas and Water Company to authorise the council to supply water within the urban district of Swanage and the parish of Langton Matravers and for other purposes.
Richmond (Surrey) Electricity Supply Act 1913	3 & 4 Geo. 5. c. xxxiii	15 August 1913
An Act to confirm an agreement relating to the supply of electricity in the borough of Richmond (Surrey) and for other purposes.
Barry Railway Act 1913	3 & 4 Geo. 5. c. xxxiv	15 August 1913
An Act to enable the Barry Railway Company to acquire lands in the county of Glamorgan to extend the time for the completion of certain railways and the acquisition of certain lands and for other purposes.
Chesterfield Corporation Railless Traction Act 1913 (repealed)	3 & 4 Geo. 5. c. xxxv	15 August 1913
An Act to enable the corporation of Chesterfield to provide and run vehicles by means of railless traction and for other purposes. (Repealed by Post Office Act 1969 (c. 48))
Mid Kent and East Kent District Water Act 1913	3 & 4 Geo. 5. c. xxxvi	15 August 1913
An Act for extending the limits of supply of the Mid Kent Water Company for sanctioning and confirming the construction of existing works for authorising the construction of new works and for conferring further powers upon that Company for conferring further powers upon the East Kent District Water Company and for authorising agreements between those companies and the South Kent Water Company and for other purposes.
Wimbledon and Sutton Railway Act 1913	3 & 4 Geo. 5. c. xxxvii	15 August 1913
An Act to extend the periods limited by the Wimbledon and Sutton Railway Act 1910 (Note: Wimbledon and Sutton Railway Act 1910 (10 Edw. 7 & 1 Geo. 5. c. xlvii)) for the compulsory purchase of lands for and for the construction and completion of the railways and works by that Act authorised to raise additional capital and for other purposes.
Midland Railway (Superannuation Fund) Act 1913	3 & 4 Geo. 5. c. xxxviii	15 August 1913
An Act to enable the Midland Railway Company to make further contributions to the superannuation fund established under the Midland Railway (Additional Powers) Act 1867 (Note: Midland Railway (Additional Powers) Act 1867 (30 & 31 Vict. c. clxx)) and for other purposes.
Westgate and Birchington Gas and Electricity Act 1913	3 & 4 Geo. 5. c. xxxix	15 August 1913
An Act to extend the limits of the Westgate and Birchington Gas Company for the supply of gas to empower the Company to supply electricity and to confer further powers on and to change the name of the Company and for other purposes.
United District Gas Act 1913	3 & 4 Geo. 5. c. xl	15 August 1913
An Act for incorporating and conferring powers on the United District Gas Company.
Port Talbot Railway and Docks Act 1913	3 & 4 Geo. 5. c. xli	15 August 1913
An Act to enable the Port Talbot Railway and Docks Company to raise additional capital.
Greenock Port and Harbours Consolidation Act 1913	3 & 4 Geo. 5. c. xlii	15 August 1913
An Act to consolidate with amendments the Acts relating to the port and harbours of Greenock to reconstitute and reincorporate the Trustees to authorise the construction of new works to provide for the adjustment of the finances of the trust to provide for a guarantee by the corporation of Greenock and for other purposes.
Leeds Corporation Act 1913 (repealed)	3 & 4 Geo. 5. c. xliii	15 August 1913
An Act to confer further powers upon the lord mayor aldermen and citizens of the city of Leeds in regard to their water undertaking to empower them to construct street improvements and for other purposes. (Repealed by Yorkshire Water Authority (Local Enactments) Order 1984 (SI 1984/108))
Tottenham and Edmonton Gas Act 1913	3 & 4 Geo. 5. c. xliv	15 August 1913
An Act to provide for the transfer of the undertaking of the Enfield Gas Company to the Tottenham and Edmonton Gas Light and Coke Company and to confer on such Company certain powers in regard to the supply of electricity and for other purposes.
York Corporation Act 1913	3 & 4 Geo. 5. c. xlv	15 August 1913
An Act to confer further powers upon the lord mayor aldermen and citizens of the city of York in relation to their electricity undertaking the Skeldergate Bridge and other matters.
Brighton Corporation Act 1913 (repealed)	3 & 4 Geo. 5. c. xlvi	15 August 1913
An Act to authorise the transfer to the mayor aldermen and burgesses of the county borough of Brighton of the powers vested in the Brighton Hove and Preston United Omnibus Company Limited under the Brighton Hove and District Railless Traction Act 1911 (Note: Brighton, Hove and District Railless Traction Act 1911 (1 & 2 Geo. 5. c. cx)) and to sanction and confirm the purchase by the Corporation of lands adjoining the borough in the parishes of Ovingdean Rottingdean and Falmer and for other purposes. (Repealed by Brighton Corporation Act 1931 (21 & 22 Geo. 5. c. cix))
Hull and Barnsley Railway Act 1913	3 & 4 Geo. 5. c. xlvii	15 August 1913
An Act to confer further powers on the Hull and Barnsley Railway Company in respect of their own undertaking and upon that Company and the North Eastern Railway Company and the Great Central Railway Company respectively in respect of joint undertakings and for other purposes.
Metropolitan District Railway Act 1913	3 & 4 Geo. 5. c. xlviii	15 August 1913
An Act to authorise the Metropolitan District Railway Company to widen part of their Fulham Extension Railway and for other purposes.
Coventry Corporation Act 1913	3 & 4 Geo. 5. c. xlix	15 August 1913
An Act to empower the mayor aldermen and citizens of the city of Coventry to provide and run motor omnibuses to confer further powers with regard to the water supply of the city to extend the areas of supply of gas and electricity and for other purpose.
Blyth and Cowpen Gas Act 1913	3 & 4 Geo. 5. c. l	15 August 1913
An Act to confer further powers upon the Blyth and Cowpen Gas Company and to enable that Company to acquire the undertaking of the Bedlington Gas Light Company Limited.
West Hampshire Water Act 1913 (repealed)	3 & 4 Geo. 5. c. li	15 August 1913
An Act to confirm and make valid the creation and issue of shares and debenture stock by the West Hampshire Water Company and for other purposes. (Repealed by West Hampshire Water Company (Constitution and Regulation) Order 1992 (SI 1992/1993))
Halkyn District Mines Drainage Act 1913	3 & 4 Geo. 5. c. lii	15 August 1913
An Act to authorise the Halkyn District Mines Drainage Company to construct additional works for the drainage of certain mines and mineral lands in the county of Flint and for other purposes.
Hove Corporation Act 1913	3 & 4 Geo. 5. c. liii	15 August 1913
An Act to confer powers upon the mayor aldermen and burgesses of the borough of Hove in relation to the acquisition of the undertaking of the Hove Electric Lighting Company Limited and to the supply of electricity and to make further provision for the health local government and improvement of the borough and for other purposes.
Metropolitan Railway Act 1913	3 & 4 Geo. 5. c. liv	15 August 1913
An Act to transfer to and vest in the Metropolitan Railway Company the undertaking of the Great Northern and City Railway Company to empower the Metropolitan Railway Company to construct a new railway and works to acquire additional land to raise additional capital and for other purposes.
Tynemouth Gas Act 1913	3 & 4 Geo. 5. c. lv	15 August 1913
An Act to extend the limits of supply of the Tynemouth Gas Company and for other purposes.
Great Western Railway Act 1913	3 & 4 Geo. 5. c. lvi	15 August 1913
An Act for conferring further powers upon the Great Western Railway Company in respect of their own undertaking and upon that Company and the London and North Western Railway Company in respect of an undertaking in which they are jointly interested and upon the Great Western and Great Central Railway Joint Committee in respect of their undertaking and for other purposes.
Titchfield District Gas Act 1913	3 & 4 Geo. 5. c. lvii	15 August 1913
An Act for incorporating and conferring powers on the Titchfield District Gas Company.
West Bridgford Urban District Council Act 1913 (repealed)	3 & 4 Geo. 5. c. lviii	15 August 1913
An Act to authorise the Urban District Council of West Bridgford to provide and work motor omnibuses and to make further and better provision for the improvement and local government of the district and for other purposes. (Repealed by Nottinghamshire County Council Act 1985 (c. xv))
Manchester Ship Canal Act 1913 (repealed)	3 & 4 Geo. 5. c. lix	15 August 1913
An Act to confer further powers upon the corporation of Manchester and the Manchester Ship Canal Company with respect to the lending and borrowing of money to empower the said Company to raise further moneys for the purposes of their undertaking and for other purposes. (Repealed by Manchester Ship Canal Harbour Revision Order 2009 (SI 2009/2579))
Great Northern Railway Act 1913	3 & 4 Geo. 5. c. lx	15 August 1913
An Act to authorise the Great Northern Railway Company to construct certain new railways a widening of railway and other works and to acquire lands and to confer further powers upon that Company to authorise the acquisition of lands by the Great Northern and Great Central Railway Companies jointly and by the Cheshire Lines Committee the Midland and Great Northern Railways Joint Committee and the Norfolk and Suffolk Joint Railways Committee to extend the time for the purchase of lands under the Cheshire Lines Act 1903 (Note: Cheshire Lines Act 1903 (3 Edw. 7. c. cxi)) and for other purposes.
Rhondda Tramways (Railless Traction) Act 1913 (repealed)	3 & 4 Geo. 5. c. lxi	15 August 1913
An Act to authorise the Rhondda Tramways Company Limited to provide and work a railless traction system in the parish of Llantrisant and for other purposes. (Repealed by Rhondda Passenger Transport Act 1933 (23 & 24 Geo. 5. c. lxix))
Llantrissant Gas Act 1913	3 & 4 Geo. 5. c. lxii	15 August 1913
An Act for incorporating and conferring powers on the Llantrisant Gas Company.
Broadstairs and St. Peter's Urban District Council Act 1913	3 & 4 Geo. 5. c. lxiii	15 August 1913
An Act to transfer to and vest in the urban district council of Broadstairs and St. Peter's in the county of Kent the undertaking of the commissioners for the care and management of the pier within the hamlet of Broadstairs and harbour of Broadstairs to provide for the extension of the urban district to authorise the Council to construct street improvements to confer further powers on the Council in regard to their water undertaking and to make further and better provision for the improvement health and local government of the district and for other purposes.
North Eastern Railway Act 1913	3 & 4 Geo. 5. c. lxiv	15 August 1913
An Act to confer additional powers upon the North Eastern Railway Company for the construction of new railways and other works and the acquisition of lands to authorise the construction of railways and the acquisition of lands by the South Yorkshire Joint Line Committee and for other purposes.
Bournemouth Gas and Water Act 1913	3 & 4 Geo. 5. c. lxv	15 August 1913
An Act to authorise the acquisition by the Bournemouth Gas and Water Company of the undertakings of the Christchurch Gas Company and the Wimborne Minster Waterworks Company Limited to confer further powers on the Bournemouth Gas and Water Company and for other purposes.
Lancashire and Yorkshire Railway Act 1913	3 & 4 Geo. 5. c. lxvi	15 August 1913
An Act to authorise the Lancashire and Yorkshire Railway Company to construct new railways to widen certain existing railways and construct other works to acquire additional lands and for other purposes.
Mexborough and Swinton Tramways (Railless Traction) Act 1913 (repealed)	3 & 4 Geo. 5. c. lxvii	15 August 1913
An Act to authorise the Mexborough and Swinton Tramways Company to provide and work trolley vehicles in connection with their tramways and for other purposes. (Repealed by Mexborough and Swinton Traction Act 1960 (8 & 9 Eliz. 2. c. xxiv))
Pontypridd and Rhondda Water Act 1913	3 & 4 Geo. 5. c. lxviii	15 August 1913
An Act to confer further powers upon the Pontypridd and Rhondda Joint Water Board.
West Bromwich Corporation Act 1913 (repealed)	3 & 4 Geo. 5. c. lxix	15 August 1913
An Act to empower the mayor aldermen and burgesses of the borough of West Bromwich to provide and work a trolley vehicle system to provide and work motor omnibuses to construct street improvements to extend their powers with regard to their gas and electricity undertakings and to the health local government and improvement of the borough and for other purposes. (Repealed by West Bromwich Corporation Act 1969 (c. lix))
Kent Electric Power Act 1913	3 & 4 Geo. 5. c. lxx	15 August 1913
An Act to provide for the reduction and rearrangement of the capital of the Kent Electric Power Company and for other purposes.
Worthing Gas Act 1913	3 & 4 Geo. 5. c. lxxi	15 August 1913
An Act to confer further powers upon the Worthing Gas Light and Coke Company.
Arundell Estate (Closing of Arundell Street and Panton Square) Act 1913	3 & 4 Geo. 5. c. lxxii	15 August 1913
An Act to authorise the closing of Arundell Street and Panton Square in the city of Westminster.
Central London Railway Act 1913	3 & 4 Geo. 5. c. lxxiii	15 August 1913
An Act to empower the Central London Railway Company to construct new railways to authorise agreements between that Company and the London and South Western Railway Company and for other purposes.
Edinburgh Corporation Act 1913	3 & 4 Geo. 5. c. lxxiv	15 August 1913
An Act to authorise the lord provost magistrates and council of the city and royal burgh of Edinburgh to construct works to purchase and acquire lands to borrow money to amend Acts and for other purposes.
Grays and Tilbury Gas Act 1913	3 & 4 Geo. 5. c. lxxv	15 August 1913
An Act to extend the limits of supply of the Grays and Tilbury Gas Company to authorise the Grays and Tilbury Gas Company to acquire certain other gas undertakings and for other purposes.
Great Eastern Railway Act 1913	3 & 4 Geo. 5. c. lxxvi	15 August 1913
An Act to enable the Great Eastern Railway Company to construct works and acquire lands at Ipswich and for other purposes.
Southgate Urban District Council Act 1913 (repealed)	3 & 4 Geo. 5. c. lxxvii	15 August 1913
An Act to confer upon the Southgate Urban District Council various powers with respect to streets and buildings in their district and with respect to the health local government and sanitation of the district and to empower the council to establish superannuation and pension funds and for other purposes. (Repealed by Local Law (North West London Boroughs) Order 1965 (SI 1965/533))
Oxford University (St. Edmund Hall and Gatcombe Rectory) Act 1913	3 & 4 Geo. 5. c. lxxviii	15 August 1913
An Act for severing the Rectory of Gatcombe from the Office of Principal of St. Edmund Hall in the University of Oxford and for other purposes.
London County Council (Money) Act 1913 (repealed)	3 & 4 Geo. 5. c. lxxix	15 August 1913
An Act to regulate the expenditure on capital account and lending of money by the London County Council during the financial period from the first day of April one thousand nine hundred and thirteen to the thirtieth day of September one thousand nine hundred and fourteen. (Repealed by London County Council (Loans) Act 1955 (4 & 5 Eliz. 2. c. xxvi))
Dundee Boundaries Act 1913 (repealed)	3 & 4 Geo. 5. c. lxxx	15 August 1913
An Act to extend the boundaries of the city and royal burgh of Dundee and of the county of the city of Dundee and for other purposes. (Repealed by North of Scotland Electricity Order Confirmation Act 1958 (7 & 8 Eliz. 2. c. ii))
Liverpool Corporation Act 1913 (repealed)	3 & 4 Geo. 5. c. lxxxi	15 August 1913
An Act for empowering the corporation of the city of Liverpool to make new streets to make better provision for the health local government and finance of the city to provide for the granting of superannuation allowances to certain officers and servants of the corporation and for other purposes. (Repealed by Liverpool Corporation Act 1921 (11 & 12 Geo. 5. c. lxxiv))
Southampton Harbour Act 1913 (repealed)	3 & 4 Geo. 5. c. lxxxii	15 August 1913
An Act for dissolving and re-incorporating the Southampton Harbour Board and for other purposes. (Repealed by Southampton Harbour Reorganisation Scheme 1967 Confirmation Order 1968 (SI 1968/941))
Watney Combe Reid & Co. Limited Act 1913	3 & 4 Geo. 5. c. lxxxiii	15 August 1913
An Act to empower Watney Combe Reid & Co. Limited to redeem a portion of its existing capital and for other purposes.
Ascot Authority Act 1913	3 & 4 Geo. 5. c. lxxxiv	15 August 1913
An Act to constitute Trustees for the purpose of holding and managing Ascot Race Course and the stands building and property held or used in connection therewith and to vest in them all property now held or used for the benefit or purposes of Ascot Races an to confer all necessary powers on the Trustees so constituted and for other purposes.
Ebbw Vale Water Act 1913	3 & 4 Geo. 5. c. lxxxv	15 August 1913
An Act to authorise the Urban District Council of Ebbw Vale to construct additional waterworks and for other purposes.
Leicester Corporation Act 1913	3 & 4 Geo. 5. c. lxxxvi	15 August 1913
An Act to enable the mayor aldermen and burgesses of the county borough of Leicester to construct additional tramways and street improvements in the borough and for other purposes.
Leith Harbour and Docks Act 1913 (repealed)	3 & 4 Geo. 5. c. lxxxvii	15 August 1913
An Act to authorise the commissioners for the harbour and docks of Leith to construct new works to borrow money and for other purposes. (Repealed by Leith Harbour and Docks Consolidation Order Confirmation Act 1935 (25 & 26 Geo. 5. c. liv))
South Western Railway Act 1913	3 & 4 Geo. 5. c. lxxxviii	15 August 1913
An Act to confer further powers on the London and South Western Railway Company and to provide for a lease to that Company of the undertaking of the North Cornwall Railway Company and for other purposes.
North British Railway Act 1913	3 & 4 Geo. 5. c. lxxxix	15 August 1913
An Act to confer powers upon the North British Railway Company to construct certain new railways and other works to confirm and give effect to agreements between that Company and the Caledonian Railway Company and the Edinburgh Corporation respectively to authorise the abandonment of a portion of the Union Canal to empower the North British Railway Company and the Burntisland Harbour Commissioners to raise further moneys and for other purposes.
Southend Waterworks Act 1913	3 & 4 Geo. 5. c. xc	15 August 1913
An Act to authorise the transfer to the Southend Waterworks Company of the Western District Water Undertaking of the Rochford Rural District Council to extend the limits of the Southend Waterworks Company for the supply of water and for other purposes.
Dover Harbour Act 1913 (repealed)	3 & 4 Geo. 5. c. xci	15 August 1913
An Act to authorise the construction of certain new works for improving the harbour of Dover and for other purposes. (Repealed by Dover Harbour Consolidation Act 1954 (2 & 3 Eliz. 2. c. iv))
Derby Corporation Act 1913	3 & 4 Geo. 5. c. xcii	15 August 1913
An Act to authorise the mayor aldermen and burgesses of the borough of Derby to construct tramways and street works to make further provision in regard to their tramway water electricity and markets undertakings and the health local government and improvement of the borough to enable them to establish a fund for the granting of superannuation allowances to their officers and servants to provide for the simplification of the procedure in the Derby Borough Court of Record and for other purposes.
Southport Corporation Act 1913	3 & 4 Geo. 5. c. xciii	15 August 1913
An Act to enable the mayor aldermen and burgesses of the county borough of Southport to carry out street improvements and other works to provide and run trolley vehicles and to make further provision for the health local government and improvement of the borough and for other purposes.
Heathfield and District Water Act 1913	3 & 4 Geo. 5. c. xciv	15 August 1913
An Act to incorporate the Heathfield and District Water Company and to enable them to construct works and to supply water to certain parishes or portions of parishes in the county of Sussex and to acquire the waterworks part of the undertaking of the Ticehurst and District Water and Gas Company and the undertaking of the Heathfield and District Water Company Limited and to enter into agreements with the owners of such undertakings and with the local authorities or others and to amend the Ticehurst Water Act 1902 (Note: Ticehurst Water Act 1902 (2 Edw. 7. c. cxx)) and the Ticehurst and District Water and Gas Act 1904. (Note: Ticehurst and District Water and Gas Act 1904 (4 Edw. 7. c. lxxx))
Huddersfield Corporation Act 1913	3 & 4 Geo. 5. c. xcv	15 August 1913
An Act to confer powers on the mayor aldermen and burgesses of the county borough of Huddersfield for the construction of tramways street works and waterworks to purchase the undertaking of the commissioners of the Deanhead Reservoir to extend the borough boundaries and to make further and better provision with regard to the tramways water and other undertakings of the corporation and for other purposes.
Bradford Corporation Act 1913 (repealed)	3 & 4 Geo. 5. c. xcvi	15 August 1913
An Act to confer powers upon the lord mayor aldermen and citizens of the city of Bradford for the construction of waterworks street works and improvements and the acquisition of lands for the provision of trolley vehicles with respect to infectious diseases and the health good government and sanitation of the city to authorise the establishment of superannuation and other funds and to make provisions with respect to various matters of local administration and management. (Repealed by West Yorkshire Act 1980 (c. xiv))
London Electric Railway Act 1913	3 & 4 Geo. 5. c. xcvii	15 August 1913
An Act to empower the London Electric Railway Company to construct new railways and for other purposes.
Metropolitan Water Board Act 1913	3 & 4 Geo. 5. c. xcviii	15 August 1913
An Act to empower the Metropolitan Water Board to make waterworks and other works and to acquire lands and for other purposes.
Barry Urban District Council Act 1913	3 & 4 Geo. 5. c. xcix	15 August 1913
An Act to confer further powers on the urban district council of Barry in regard to their water and gas undertakings to extend the powers of the council with regard to the improvement health and local government of the district and for other purposes.
Belfast Corporation Act 1913	3 & 4 Geo. 5. c. c	15 August 1913
An Act to extend and enlarge the powers of the lord mayor aldermen and citizens of the city of Belfast with respect to finance and borrowing to confer further powers with respect to sanitary matters and matters of local administration and for other purposes.
London County Council (General Powers) Act 1913	3 & 4 Geo. 5. c. ci	15 August 1913
An Act to confer powers on the London County Council and metropolitan borough councils and for other purposes.
London County Council (Tramways and Improvements) Act 1913	3 & 4 Geo. 5. c. cii	15 August 1913
An Act to empower the London County Council to construct and work tramways to make street improvements and other works and for other purposes.
Metropolitan Electric Tramways (Railless Traction) Act 1913	3 & 4 Geo. 5. c. ciii	15 August 1913
An Act to empower the Metropolitan Electric Tramways Limited to provide and work vehicles by means of railless traction and for other purposes.
Silloth Gas Act 1913	3 & 4 Geo. 5. c. civ	15 August 1913
An Act to empower the Holme Cultram Urban District Council to purchase certain gasworks of the North British Railway Company and to supply gas within the urban district.
Southend-on-Sea Corporation Act 1913 (repealed)	3 & 4 Geo. 5. c. cv	15 August 1913
An Act to extend the boundaries of the borough of Southend-on-Sea and to constitute the extended borough a county borough to consolidate the parishes of the extended borough into one parish to enable the corporation to establish a separate police force and to provide and work motor omnibuses to make further provision in regard to the health local government and improvement of the borough and for other purposes. (Repealed by Essex Act 1987 (c. xx))
Ipswich Dock Act 1913	3 & 4 Geo. 5. c. cvi	15 August 1913
An Act to alter the constitution of and method of election to the Ipswich Dock Commission to confer further powers on the commissioners to authorise them to construct works and acquire lands to raise additional money and to create stock and for other purposes.
Reading Corporation Act 1913	3 & 4 Geo. 5. c. cvii	15 August 1913
An Act to empower the mayor aldermen and burgesses of the borough of Reading to construct bridges across the Thames street improvements and other works and for other purposes.
Limerick Harbour (Bridge) Act 1913	3 & 4 Geo. 5. c. cviii	15 August 1913
An Act to authorise the construction of a new in substitution for an existing bridge over the River Shannon and for other purposes.
Aberystwyth Corporation Act 1913	3 & 4 Geo. 5. c. cix	15 August 1913
An Act to confer further powers on the corporation of Aberystwyth with regard to their water and market undertakings and to make further and better provision with regard to the improvement health local government and finance of the borough.
City and South London Railway Act 1913	3 & 4 Geo. 5. c. cx	15 August 1913
An Act for empowering the City and South London Railway Company to enlarge their railway tunnels to raise further money and for other purposes.
Alexandra Park and Palace Act 1913	3 & 4 Geo. 5. c. cxi	15 August 1913
An Act to confer further powers upon the Alexandra Park and Palace Trustees with respect to the temporary closing and use of the park and palace for exhibitions to extend the period for which portions of the park and palace may be let and for other purposes.
Morley Corporation Act 1913	3 & 4 Geo. 5. c. cxii	15 August 1913
An Act to confer further powers upon the mayor aldermen and burgesses of the borough of Morley in relation to their gas water and electricity undertakings and with respect to the disposal of trade refuse and to make further provision in regard to the health improvement and good government of the borough.
Nottingham Corporation Act 1913	3 & 4 Geo. 5. c. cxiii	15 August 1913
An Act to authorise the mayor aldermen and citizens of the city of Nottingham and county of the same city to construct tramways to provide and work a trolley vehicle system to provide and work motor omnibuses and for other purposes.
Westminster Hospital Act 1913	3 & 4 Geo. 5. c. cxiv	15 August 1913
An Act to empower the president vice-presidents treasurers and governors of the Westminster Hospital to acquire lands for and to erect a new hospital to authorise the sale and disposal of the site of Westminster Hospital and for other purposes.
Western Valleys (Monmouthshire) Railless Electric Traction Act 1913	3 & 4 Geo. 5. c. cxv	15 August 1913
An Act for incorporating and conferring powers on the Western Valleys ( Monmouthshire ) Railless Electric Traction Company and for other purposes.
Post Office (London) Railway Act 1913	3 & 4 Geo. 5. c. cxvi	15 August 1913
An Act to enable the Postmaster-General to construct for the purposes of the Post Office certain underground railways and other works in London and for purposes in connexion with such railways.
Education Board Provisional Orders Confirmation (Cardigan, &c.) Act 1913	3 & 4 Geo. 5. c. cxvii	15 August 1913
An Act to confirm certain Provisional Orders made by the Board of Education under the Education Acts 1870 to 1911 to enable the councils of the administrative counties of Cardigan Carmarthen Cumberland Kent Merioneth Montgomery Pembroke and the West Riding of Yorkshire and the Urban District of Aberdare to put in force the Lands Clauses Acts.
	Cardigan County Council Order 1913 Provisional Order for putting in force the Lands Clauses Acts.	
	Carmarthenshire County Council Order 1913 Provisional Order for putting in force the Lands Clauses Acts.	
	Cumberland County Council Order 1913 Provisional Order for putting in force the Lands Clauses Acts.	
	Kent County Council Order 1913 Provisional Order for putting in force the Lands Clauses Acts.	
	Merioneth County Council Order 1913 Provisional Order for putting in force the Lands Clauses Acts.	
	Montgomery County Council Order 1913 Provisional Order for putting in force the Lands Clauses Acts.	
	Pembrokeshire County Council Order 1913 Provisional Order for putting in force the Lands Clauses Acts.	
	Yorks West Riding County Council Order 1913 Provisional Order for putting in force the Lands Clauses Acts.	
	Aberdare Urban District Council Order 1913 Provisional Order for putting in force the Lands Clauses Acts.	
Education Board Provisional Order Confirmation (London No. 1) Act 1913	3 & 4 Geo. 5. c. cxviii	15 August 1913
An Act to confirm a Provisional Order made by the Board of Education under the Education Acts 1870 to 1911 to enable the London County Council to put in force the Lands Clauses Acts.
	London County Council (No. 1) Order 1913 Provisional Order (No. 1) for putting in force the Lands Clauses Acts.	
Education Board Provisional Order Confirmation (London No. 2) Act 1913	3 & 4 Geo. 5. c. cxix	15 August 1913
An Act to confirm a Provisional Order made by the Board of Education under the Education Acts 1870 to 1911 to enable the London County Council to put in force the Lands Clauses Acts.
	London County Council (No. 2) Order 1913 Provisional Order (No. 2) for putting in force the Lands Clauses Acts.	
Education Board Provisional Order Confirmation (London No. 3) Act 1913	3 & 4 Geo. 5. c. cxx	15 August 1913
An Act to confirm a Provisional Order made by the Board of Education under the Education Acts 1870 to 1911 to enable the London County Council to put in force the Lands Clauses Acts.
	London County Council (No. 3) Order 1913 Provisional Order (No. 3) for putting in force the Lands Clauses Acts.	
Local Government Board (Ireland) Provisional Orders Confirmation (No. 1) Act 1913	3 & 4 Geo. 5. c. cxxi	15 August 1913
An Act to confirm certain Provisional Orders of the Local Government Board for Ireland relating to Mullingar and the County of Tipperary (South Riding).
	Mullingar Sewerage Order 1913 Provisional Order to enable the Council of the Rural District of Mullingar to put in force the Compulsory Clauses of the Lands Clauses Acts.	
	County of Tipperary (South Riding) Order 1913 Provisional Order made in pursuance of Article 22 of the Local Government (Application of Enactments) Order 1898. (Note: Local Government (Application of Enactments) Order 1898 (SR&O 1899/1120))	
Local Government Board (Ireland) Provisional Orders Confirmation (No. 2) Act 1913	3 & 4 Geo. 5. c. cxxii	15 August 1913
An Act to confirm certain Provisional Orders of the Local Government Board for Ireland relating to the Urban Districts of Carlow Galway and Larne and the City of Dublin.
	Carlow (Castle Hill) Order 1913 Provisional Order to enable the Council of the Urban District of Carlow to put in force the Compulsory Clauses of the Lands Clauses Acts.	
	Galway Order 1913 Provisional Order to enable the Council of the Urban District of Galway to put in force the Compulsory Clauses of the Lands Clauses Acts.	
	Larne Order 1913 Provisional Order to enable the Council of the Urban District of Larne to put in force the Compulsory Clauses of the Lands Clauses Acts.	
	Dublin (Carter's Lane) Order 1913 Provisional Order to enable the Corporation of Dublin to put in force the Compulsory Clauses of the Lands Clauses Acts.	
Tramways Orders Confirmation Act 1913	3 & 4 Geo. 5. c. cxxiii	15 August 1913
An Act to confirm certain Provisional Orders made by the Board of Trade under the Tramways Act 1870 (Note: Tramways Act 1870 (33 & 34 Vict. c. 78)) relating to Baildon Urban District Council Tramway and Newcastle-upon-Tyne Corporation Tramways.
	Baildon Urban District Council Tramway Order 1913 Order authorising the Urban District Council of the Urban District of Baildon to construct a Tramway in their District.	
	Newcastle-upon-Tyne Corporation Tramways Order 1913 Order authorising the Lord Mayor Aldermen and Citizens of the City and County of Newcastle upon Tyne to construct additional Tramways in the said City.	
Gas Orders Confirmation Act 1913	3 & 4 Geo. 5. c. cxxiv	15 August 1913
An Act to confirm certain Provisional Orders made by the Board of Trade under the Gas and Water Works Facilities Act 1870 (Note: Gas and Water Works Facilities Act 1870 (33 & 34 Vict. c. 70)) relating to Kibworth Gas Midsomer Norton Gas Redditch Gas and West Staffordshire Gas.
	Kibworth Gas Order 1913 Order authorising the maintenance and continuance of existing Gasworks and Works connected therewith and the manufacture and supply of Gas in the Parishes of Kibworth Beauchamp Kibworth Harcourt Smeeton Westerby Fleckney and Saddington in the Rural District of Market Harborough all in the County of Leicester.	
	Midsomer Norton Gas Order 1913 Order empowering the Midsomer Norton Gas and Coke Company Limited to construct additional gasworks to raise additional capital and for other purposes.	
	Redditch Gas Order 1913 Order empowering the Redditch Gas Company to construct further works for the manufacture and storage of gas and to raise additional Capital and for other purposes.	
	West Staffordshire Gas Order 1913 Order authorising the maintenance and continuance of gasworks and the manufacture and supply of gas in the parishes of Brewood Lapley and Wheaton Aston Stretton Church Eaton Gnosall and Haughton and part of the parish of Blymhill all in the county of Stafford and for other purposes.	
Gas and Water Orders Confirmation (No. 1) Act 1913	3 & 4 Geo. 5. c. cxxv	15 August 1913
An Act to confirm certain Provisional Orders made by the Board of Trade under the Gas and Water Works Facilities Act 1870 relating to Dronfield Gas Alresford Water and Borough of Portsmouth Water.
	Dronfield Gas Order 1913 Order to amend and extend the powers of the Dronfield Gas Light and Coke Company and for other purposes.	
	Alresford Water Order 1913 Order authorising the Alresford Water Company Limited to maintain and continue waterworks and to supply water in the parish of New Alresford in the county of Southampton.	
	Borough of Portsmouth Water Order 1913 Order empowering the Borough of Portsmouth Waterworks Company to extend their limits of supply and for other purposes.	
Gas and Water Orders Confirmation (No. 2) Act 1913	3 & 4 Geo. 5. c. cxxvi	15 August 1913
An Act to confirm certain Provisional Orders made by the Board of Trade under the Gas and Water Works Facilities Act 1870 relating to Faversham Gas Hawkhurst Gas Peniston Thurlstone and Oxspring Gas and Wey Valley Water.
	Faversham Gas Order 1913 Order extending the limits of supply of the Faversham Gas Company and empowering that Company to use additional lands for the manufacture and storage of gas and residual products and for other purposes.	
	Hawkhurst Gas Order 1913 Order empowering the Hawkhurst Gas Company Limited to construct and maintain additional works for the manufacture and storage of gas to raise additional capital and for other purposes.	
	Peniston and District Gas Order 1913 Order empowering the Peniston Thurlstone and Oxspring Gas Company to extend their limits of supply to raise additional capital and for other purposes.	
	Wey Valley Water Order 1913 Order empowering the Wey Valley Water Company to construct new works to raise additional capital and for other purposes.	
Local Government Board's Provisional Order Confirmation (Gas) Act 1913	3 & 4 Geo. 5. c. cxxvii	15 August 1913
An Act to confirm a Provisional Order of the Local Government Board relating to Biddulph.
	Biddulph Gas Order 1913 Provisional Order under the Gas and Water Works Facilities Act 1870.	
Local Government Board's Provisional Orders Confirmation (No. 4) Act 1913	3 & 4 Geo. 5. c. cxxviii	15 August 1913
An Act to confirm certain Provisional Orders of the Local Government Board relating to Blackpool Briton Ferry Cleckheaton Preston and Workington.
	Blackpool Order 1913 Provisional Order for altering the Blackpool Improvement Act 1899 (Note: Blackpool Improvement Act 1899 (62 & 63 Vict. c. clxxxiv)) and the Local Government Board's Provisional Orders Confirmation (No. 11) Act 1902. (Note: Local Government Board's Provisional Orders Confirmation (No. 11) Act 1902 (2 Edw. 7. c. lxxxiv))	
	Briton Ferry Order 1913 Provisional Order for altering the Briton Ferry Local Board Act 1873 (Note: Briton Ferry Local Board Act 1873 (36 & 37 Vict. c. cxxii)) and certain Confirming Acts. (Note: Local Government Board's Provisional Orders Confirmation (Briton Ferry, &c.) Act 1876 (39 & 40 Vict. c. xvi)) (Note: Local Government Board's Provisional Orders Confirmation (Abingdon, &c.) Act 1880 (43 & 44 Vict. c. xxxvi)) (Note: Local Government Board's Provisional Orders Confirmation (No. 13) Act 1905 (5 Edw. 7. c. lxxxvi))	
	Cleckheaton Order 1913 Provisional Order for altering the Cleckheaton Local Board Act 1870 (Note: Cleckheaton Local Board Act 1870 (33 & 34 Vict. c. lxix)) and the Local Government Board's Provisional Orders Confirmation (No. 4) Act 1888. (Note: Local Government Board's Provisional Orders Confirmation (No. 4) Act 1888 (51 & 52 Vict. c. lxii))	
	Preston Order 1913 Provisional Order for partially repealing and altering the Preston Corporation Markets Act 1861 (Note: Preston Corporation Markets Act 1861 (24 & 25 Vict. c. vii)) and the Preston Improvement Act 1869. (Note: Preston Improvement Act 1869 (32 & 33 Vict. c. lxxxvii))	
	Workington Order 1913 Provisional Order for partially repealing and altering certain Local Acts. (Note: Cockermouth and Workington Water Act 1878 (41 & 42 Vict. c. lxxiii)) (Note: Workington Local Board Water Act 1883 (46 & 47 Vict. c. l)) (Note: Workington Corporation Act 1899 (62 & 63 Vict. c. cclx))	
Local Government Board's Provisional Orders Confirmation (No. 5) Act 1913	3 & 4 Geo. 5. c. cxxix	15 August 1913
An Act to confirm certain Provisional Orders of the Local Government Board relating to Brynmawr Cambridge Chiswick Croydon Doncaster Nelson Rhondda Willesden and Wood Green.
	Brynmawr Order 1913 Provisional Order to enable the Urban District Council of Brynmawr to put in force the Compulsory Clauses of the Lands Clauses Acts.	
	Cambridge Order 1913 Provisional Order to enable the Urban District Council for the Borough of Cambridge to put in force the Compulsory Clauses of the Lands Clauses Acts.	
	Chiswick Order 1913 Provisional Order to enable the Urban District Council of Chiswick to put in force the Compulsory Clauses of the Lands Clauses Acts.	
	Croydon Order 1913 Provisional Order to enable the Urban Sanitary Authority for the Borough of Croydon to put in force the Compulsory Clauses of the Lands Clauses Acts.	
	Doncaster Order 1913 Provisional Order to enable the Urban District Council for the Borough of Doncaster to put in force the Compulsory Clauses of the Lands Clauses Acts.	
	Nelson Order 1913 Provisional Order to enable the Urban District Council for the Borough of Nelson to put in force the Compulsory Clauses of the Lands Clauses Acts.	
	Rhondda Order 1913 Provisional Order to enable the Urban District Council Rhondda to put in force the Compulsory Clauses of the Lands Clauses Acts.	
	Willesden Order 1913 Provisional Order to enable the Urban District Council of Willesden to put in force the Compulsory Clauses of the Lands Clauses Acts.	
	Wood Green Order 1913 Provisional Order to enable the Urban District Council of Wood Green to put in force the Compulsory Clauses of the Lands Clauses Acts.	
Local Government Board's Provisional Orders Confirmation (No. 6) Act 1913	3 & 4 Geo. 5. c. cxxx	15 August 1913
An Act to confirm certain Provisional Orders of the Local Government Board relating to Burton-upon-Trent Kendal Newcastle-upon-Tyne Stockton-on-Tees and Torquay.
	Burton-upon-Trent Order 1913 Provisional Order for altering certain Local Acts (Note: Town of Burton-upon-Trent Act 1853) (Note: Burton-upon-Trent Improvement Act 1878 (41 & 42 Vict. c. lxi)) (Note: Burton-upon-Trent Corporation Act 1896 (59 & 60 Vict. c. cxlviii)) and Confirming Act. (Note: Local Government Board's Provisional Orders Confirmation (No. 8) Act 1911 (1 & 2 Geo. 5. c. cxlvi))	
	Kendal Order 1913 Provisional Order for altering the Kendal Corporation Gas and Water Act 1894. (Note: Kendal Corporation Gas and Water Act 1894 (57 & 58 Vict. c. lxxviii))	
	Newcastle-upon-Tyne Order 1913 Provisional Order for partially repealing and altering the Newcastle-upon-Tyne Tramways and Improvement Act 1899. (Note: Newcastle-upon-Tyne Tramways and Improvement Act 1899 (62 & 63 Vict. c. cclxv))	
	Stockton-on-Tees Order 1913 Provisionat Order for altering certain Local Acts. (Note: Stockton Gas Act 1857 (20 & 21 Vict. c. lii)) (Note: Stockton Gas Act 1866 (29 & 30 Vict. c. cvi)) (Note: Stockton Gas Act 1873 (36 & 37 Vict. c. lxvii)) (Note: Stockton-on-Tees Corporation (Gas) Act 1893 (56 & 57 Vict. c. xvi))	
	Torquay Order 1913 Provisional Order for partially repealing and altering the Saint Mary Church Local Board Act 1868. (Note: St. Mary Church Local Board Act 1868 (31 & 32 Vict. c. cxxix))	
Local Government Board's Provisional Orders Confirmation (No. 7) Act 1913	3 & 4 Geo. 5. c. cxxxi	15 August 1913
An Act to confirm certain Provisional Orders of the Local Government Board relating to Bath Manchester Wigan Wombwell the Chester-le-Street Joint Hospital District and the North Staffordshire Joint Small-pox Hospital District.
	Bath Order 1913 Provisional Order for altering the Bath Act 1879. (Note: Bath Act 1879 (42 & 43 Vict. c. lxii))	
	Manchester Order 1913 Provisional Order for altering certain Local Acts (Note: Manchester Corporation Act 1891 (54 & 55 Vict. c. ccvii)) (Note: Manchester Corporation Act 1897 (60 & 61 Vict. c. ccxli)) and a Confirming Act. (Note: Local Government Board's Provisional Order Confirmation (No. 15) Act 1907 (7 Edw. 7. c. clxv))	
	Wigan Order 1913 Provisional Order for altering the Wigan Corporation Act 1905. (Note: Wigan Corporation Act 1905 (5 Edw. 7. c. ccxii))	
	Wombwell Order 1913 Provisional Order for partially repealing and altering the Wombwell Local Board Gas Act 1879. (Note: Wombwell Local Board Gas Act 1879 (42 & 43 Vict. c. cxxiv))	
	Chester-le-Street Joint Hospital Order 1913 Provisional Order for forming a United District under Section 279 of the Public Health Act 1875. (Note: Public Health Act 1875 (38 & 39 Vict. c. 55))	
	North Staffordshire Joint Smallpox Hospital Order 1913 Provisional Order for altering certain Confirming Acts. (Note: Local Government Board's Provisional Orders Confirmation (No. 14) Act 1902 (2 Edw. 7. c. lxxxvi)) (Note: Local Government Board's Provisional Orders Confirmation (No. 14) Act 1904 (4 Edw. 7. c. cxxi))	
Local Government Board's Provisional Orders Confirmation (No. 8) Act 1913	3 & 4 Geo. 5. c. cxxxii	15 August 1913
An Act to confirm certain Provisional Orders of the Local Government Board relating to Birmingham and Wolverhampton.
	Birmingham (Rating) Order 1913 Provisional Order for altering certain Local Acts (Note: Birmingham Corporation (Consolidation) Act 1883 (46 & 47 Vict. c. lxx)) and Confirming Acts. (Note: Local Government Board's Provisional Orders Confirmation (No. 11) Act 1894 (57 & 58 Vict. c. cxxiii)) (Note: Local Government Board's Provisional Order (1910) Confirmation (No. 13) Act 1911 (1 & 2 Geo. 5. c. xxxvi))	
	Wolverhampton Order 1913 Provisional Order for altering the Wolverhampton Improvement Act 1869. (Note: Wolverhampton Improvement Act 1869 (32 & 33 Vict. c. cxxxi))	
Local Government Board's Provisional Orders Confirmation (No. 9) Act 1913	3 & 4 Geo. 5. c. cxxxiii	15 August 1913
An Act to confirm certain Provisional Orders of the Local Government Board relating to Barnes Burnley Gelligaer Hendon Linthwaite and Pontardawe Rural.
	Barnes Order 1913 Provisional Order to enable the Urban District Council of Barnes to put in force the Compulsory Clauses of the Lands Clauses Acts.	
	Burnley Order 1913 Provisional Order to enable the Urban Sanitary Authority for the Borough of Burnley to put in force the Compulsory Clauses of the Lands Clauses Acts.	
	Gelligaer Order 1913 Provisional Order to enable the Urban District Council of Gelligaer to put in force the Compulsory Clauses of the Lands Clauses Acts.	
	Hendon Order 1913 Provisional Order to enable the Urban District Council of Hendon to put in force the Compulsory Clauses of the Lands Clauses Acts.	
	Linthwaite Order 1913 Provisional Order to enable the Urban District Council of Linthwaite to put in force the Compulsory Clauses of the Lands Clauses Acts.	
	Pontardawe Rural Order 1913 Provisional Order to enable the Rural District Council Pontardawe to put in force the Compulsory Clauses of the Lands Clauses Acts.	
Local Government Board's Provisional Orders Confirmation (No. 10) Act 1913	3 & 4 Geo. 5. c. cxxxiv	15 August 1913
An Act to confirm certain Provisional Orders of the Local Government Board relating to Carlisle and Scarborough.
	County Borough of Carlisle Order 1913 Provisional Order made in pursuance of the Local Government Act 1888 for constituting a County Borough.	
	Scarborough (Extension) Order 1913 Provisional Order made in pursuance of the Local Government Act 1888 for extending a Borough.	
Local Government Board's Provisional Order Confirmation (No. 11) Act 1913	3 & 4 Geo. 5. c. cxxxv	15 August 1913
An Act to confirm a Provisional Order of the Local Government Board relating to Exeter.
	Exeter (Extension) Order 1913 Provisional Order made in pursuance of the Local Government Act 1888 for extending a County Borough.	
Local Government Board's Provisional Order Confirmation (No. 12) Act 1913	3 & 4 Geo. 5. c. cxxxvi	15 August 1913
An Act to confirm a Provisional Order of the Local Government Board relating to Saint Alban.
	St. Alban (Extension) Order 1913 Provisional Order made in pursuance of the Local Government Act 1888 for extending a Borough.	
Local Government Board's Provisional Orders Confirmation (No. 13) Act 1913	3 & 4 Geo. 5. c. cxxxvii	15 August 1913
An Act to confirm certain Provisional Orders of the Local Government Board relating to Manchester and Stockport.
	Manchester (Extension) Order 1913 Provisional Order made in pursuance of the Local Government Act 1888 for extending a County Borough.	
	Stockport (Extension) Order 1913 Provisional Order made in pursuance of the Local Government Act 1888 for extending a County Borough.	
Local Government Board's Provisional Order Confirmation (No. 14) Act 1913 (repealed)	3 & 4 Geo. 5. c. cxxxviii	15 August 1913
An Act to confirm a Provisional Order of the Local Government Board relating to Liverpool. (Repealed by County of Merseyside Act 1980 (c. x))
	Liverpool (Extension) Order 1918 Provisional Order made in pursuance of the Local Government Act 1888 for extending a County Borough.	
Local Government Board's Provisional Order Confirmation (No. 15) Act 1913	3 & 4 Geo. 5. c. cxxxix	15 August 1913
An Act to confirm a Provisional Order of the Local Government Board relating to the East Lancing Sea Defence District.
	East Lancing Sea Defence Order 1913 Provisional Order for partially repealing and altering a Local Act (Note: Worthing and Lancing Turnpike Road and Sea Defences Act 1826 (7 Geo. 4. c. x)) and certain Confirming Acts. (Note: Local Government Supplemental Act 1869 (32 & 33 Vict. c. cxxiv)) (Note: Local Government Board's Provisional Orders Confirmation (Bath, &c.) Act 1876 (39 & 40 Vict. c. cci)) (Note: Local Government Board's Provisional Orders Confirmation (No. 14) Act 1891 (54 & 55 Vict. c. ccxi))	
Local Government Board's Provisional Order Confirmation (No. 16) Act 1913	3 & 4 Geo. 5. c. cxl	15 August 1913
An Act to confirm a Provisional Order of the Local Government Board relating to Bacup and the District of the Bury and District Joint Water Board.
	Bacup and Bury and District Joint Water Board Order 1913 Provisional Order for altering certain Local Acts. (Note: Rossendale Waterworks Act 1853 (16 & 17 Vict. c. lix)) (Note: Bacup Corporation Water Act 1894 (57 & 58 Vict. c. lxv)) (Note: Bacup Corporation Water Act 1898 (61 & 62 Vict. c. clvi)) (Note: Bacup Corporation Act 1906 (6 Edw. 7. c. clxxi))	
Local Government Board's Provisional Orders Confirmation (No. 17) Act 1913	3 & 4 Geo. 5. c. cxli	15 August 1913
An Act to confirm certain Provisional Orders of the Local Government Board relating to Ilkeston Scunthorpe and Wantage (Rural).
	Ilkeston Order 1913 Provisional Order for altering the Ilkeston Corporation Act 1898. (Note: Ilkeston Corporation Act 1898 (61 & 62 Vict. c. lxx))	
	Scunthorpe Order 1913 Provisional Order for altering the Scunthorpe Urban District Gas and Water Act 1899 (Note: Scunthorpe Urban District Gas and Water Act 1899 (62 & 63 Vict. c. xcvii)) and the Local Government Board's Provisional Orders Confirmation (No. 5) Act 1910. (Note: Local Government Board's Provisional Orders Confirmation (No. 5) Act 1910 (10 Edw. 7 & 1 Geo. 5. c. lxxxii))	
	Wantage Rural Order 1913 Provisional Order to enable the Rural District Council of Wantage to put in force the Compulsory Clauses of the Lands Clauses Acts.	
Local Government Board's Provisional Order Confirmation (No. 18) Act 1913	3 & 4 Geo. 5. c. cxlii	15 August 1913
An Act to confirm a Provisional Order of the Local Government Board relating to Middlesbrough.
	Middlesbrough (Extension) Order 1913 Provisional Order made in pursuance of the Local Government Act 1888 for extending a County Borough.	
Local Government Board's Provisional Order Confirmation (No. 19) Act 1913	3 & 4 Geo. 5. c. cxliii	15 August 1913
An Act to confirm a Provisional Order of the Local Government Board relating to Stockton-on-Tees.
	Stockton-on-Tees (Extension) Order 1913 Provisional Order made in pursuance of the Local Government Act 1888 for extending a Borough.	
Local Government Board's Provisional Order Confirmation (No. 20) Act 1913	3 & 4 Geo. 5. c. cxliv	15 August 1913
An Act to confirm a Provisional Order of the Local Government Board relating to Margate.
	Margate (Extension) Order 1913 Provisional Order made in pursuance of Sections 54 and 59 of the Local Government Act 1888.	
Local Government Board's Provisional Order Confirmation (No. 22) Act 1913	3 & 4 Geo. 5. c. cxlv	15 August 1913
An Act to confirm a Provisional Order of the Local Government Board relating to the County of Glamorgan.
	County of Glamorgan Order 1913 Provisional Order made in pursuance of subsection (2) of Section 69 of the Local Government Act 1888.	
Pier and Harbour Orders Confirmation (No. 1) Act 1913	3 & 4 Geo. 5. c. cxlvi	15 August 1913
An Act to confirm certain Provisional Orders made by the Board of Trade under the General Pier and Harbour Act 1861 (Note: General Pier and Harbour Act 1861 (24 & 25 Vict. c. 45)) relating to Berwick-upon-Tweed Lymington and Padstow.
	Berwick-upon-Tweed Harbour Order 1913 Order authorising the Berwick Harbour Commissioners to construct a Quay and other works at Berwick-upon-Tweed in the County of Northumberland to amend the Acts relating to the Harbour of Berwick-upon-Tweed and for other purposes.	
	Lymington River and Harbour Order 1913 Order for conferring powers on the Mayor Aldermen and Burgesses of the Borough of Lymington with reference to the maintenance management and improvement of the Lymington River and Harbour and to authorise them to borrow money for the purposes of the said river and harbour and otherwise and for other purposes.	
	Padstow Harbour Order 1913 Order to authorise the Padstow Harbour Commissioners to construct additional works to confer further powers on the Commissioners to amend the Acts and Order relating to the harbour and for other purposes.	
Pier and Harbour Orders Confirmation (No. 2) Act 1913 (repealed)	3 & 4 Geo. 5. c. cxlvii	15 August 1913
An Act to confirm certain Provisional Orders made by the Board of Trade under the General Pier and Harbour Act 1861 relating to Portknockie and Raasay. (Repealed by Statute Law (Repeals) Act 1998 (c. 43))
	Portknockie Harbour Order 1913 Order for the transfer from the Portknockie Harbour Commissioners incorporated under the Portknockie Harbour Order 1893 as confirmed by the Pier and Harbour Orders Confirmation (No. 4) Act 1893 (Note: Pier and Harbour Orders Confirmation (No. 4) Act 1893 (56 & 57 Vict. c. cxviii)) and the Acts incorporated therewith of the undertaking known as the Portknockie Harbour and certain lands and other subjects in the vicinity thereof to the Provost Magistrates and Councillors of the Police Burgh of Portknockie in the County of Banff to confer powers on the Town Council with reference to holding maintenance management and improvement of the said Harbour and to authorise the Town Council to borrow money for the purposes of the said Harbour and otherwise and for other purposes.	
	Raasay Pier Order 1913 Order authorising the levying of rates at and the regulation of a pier situate on the Island of Raasay in the County of Inverness.	
Pier and Harbour Orders Confirmation (No. 3) Act 1913 (repealed)	3 & 4 Geo. 5. c. cxlviii	15 August 1913
An Act to confirm certain Provisional Orders made by the Board of Trade under the General Pier and Harbour Act 1861 relating to Buckie and Findochty. (Repealed by Grampian Regional Council (Harbours) Order Confirmation Act 1987 (c. x))
	Buckie Burgh and Buckie (Cluny) Harbour Order 1913 Order for empowering the Provost Magistrates and Councillors of the Burgh of Buckie in the County of Banff to construct additional Works at Buckie (Cluny) Harbour to borrow money for the purposes thereof to apply to the purposes of this Order the special Cluny Harbour rate and for other purposes.	
	Findochty Harbour Order 1913 Order for amending the Findochty Harbour Order 1893 and for the construction and maintenance and regulation of Piers and Works in connection therewith and for other purposes.	
Electric Lighting Orders Confirmation (No. 1) Act 1913	3 & 4 Geo. 5. c. cxlix	15 August 1913
An Act to confirm certain Provisional Orders made by the Board of Trade under the Electric Lighting Acts 1882 to 1909 relating to Baildon Beckenham (Extension) Chipping Norton Hazel Grove and Bramhall Itchen Skelton and Brotton Southborough Stoke-on-Trent (Extension) Truro and Weaverham District.
	Baildon Electric Lighting Order 1913 Provisional Order granted by the Board of Trade under the Electric Lighting Acts 1882 to 1909 to the Urban District Council of Baildon in respect of the Urban District of Baildon in the West Riding of the County of York.	
	Beckenham Electric Lighting (Extension) Order 1913 Provisional Order granted by the Board of Trade under the Electric Lighting Acts 1882 to 1909 to the Beckenham Urban District Council in respect of a part of the Urban District of Beckenham and in respect of the Parish of West Wickham in the Rural District of Bromley in the County of Kent.	
	Chipping Norton Electric Lighting Order 1913 Provisional Order granted by the Board of Trade under the Electric Lighting Acts 1882 to 1909 to William Albert Schultz carrying on business as the Chipping Norton Electric Supply Company in respect of the Borough of Chipping Norton in the County of Oxford.	
	Hazel Grove and Bramhall Electric Lighting Order 1913 Provisional Order granted by the Board of Trade under the Electric Lighting Acts 1882 to 1909 to the Hazel Grove and Bramhall Urban District Council in respect of the Urban District of Hazel Grove and Bramhall in the County of Chester.	
	Itchen Electric Lighting Order 1913 Provisional Order granted by the Board of Trade under the Electric Lighting Acts 1882 to 1909 to the Urban District Council of Itchen in respect of the Urban District of Itchen in the County of Southampton.	
	Skelton and Brotton Electric Lighting Order 1913 Provisional Order granted by the Board of Trade under the Electric Lighting Acts 1882 to 1909 to the Urban District Council of Skelton and Brotton in respect of the Urban District of Skelton and Brotton in the North Riding of the County of York.	
	Southborough Electric Lighting Order 1913 Provisional Order granted by the Board of Trade under the Electric Lighting Acts 1882 to 1909 to the Urban District Council of Southborough in respect of the Urban District of Southborough in the County of Kent.	
	Stoke-on-Trent Electric Lighting (Extension) Order 1913 Provisional Order granted by the Board of Trade under the Electric Lighting Acts 1882 to 1909 for extending the area of supply under the Burslem Electric Lighting Order 1898 so as to include the whole of the Wolstanton Ward of the Urban District of Wolstanton (United) and for amending the Burslem Electric Lighting Order 1898 and repealing the Burslem Electric Lighting (Extension) Order 1899.	
	Truro Electric Lighting Order 1913 Provisional Order granted by the Board of Trade under the Electric Lighting Acts 1882 to 1909 to the Mayor Aldermen and Citizens of the City of Truro in respect of the City of Truro in the County of Cornwall.	
	Weaverham District Electric Lighting Order 1913 Provisional Order granted by the Board of Trade under the Electric Lighting Acts 1882 to 1909 to the Weaverham Electricity Supply Company Limited in respect of the parishes of Weaverham-cum-Milton Acton and Cuddington and part of the Parish of Oakmere all in the Northwich Rural District in the County of Chester.	
Electric Lighting Orders Confirmation (No. 2) Act 1913	3 & 4 Geo. 5. c. cl	15 August 1913
An Act to confirm certain Provisional Orders made by the Board of Trade under the Electric Lighting Acts 1882 to 1909 relating to Barnet (Extension) Barton-on-Humber Basingstoke Derby (Extension) Doncaster (Extension) Ellesmere Port and Whitby Kingswear Leatherhead and District (Extension) Mid-Sussex and Northwood and Ruislip (Extension).
	Barnet Electric Lighting (Extension) Order 1913 Provisional Order granted by the Board of Trade under the Electric Lighting Acts 1882 to 1909 to the North Metropolitan Electrical Power Distribution Company Limited in respect of the Parish of Arkley in the Urban District of Barnet in the County of Hertford.	
	Barton-on-Humber Electric Lighting Order 1913 Provisional Order granted by the Board of Trade under the Electric Lighting Acts 1882 to 1909 to Mr. Fred Hopper in respect of the Urban District of Barton-on-Humber in the County of Lincoln.	
	Basingstoke Electric Lighting Order 1913 Provisional Order granted by the Board of Trade under the Electric Lighting Acts 1882 to 1909 to the Mayor Aldermen and Burgesses of the Borough of Basingstoke in respect of the Borough of Basingstoke and the Parishes of Sherborne St. John and Basing in the Basingstoke Rural District in the County of Southampton.	
	Derby Corporation Electric Lighting (Extension) Order 1913 Provisional Order granted by the Board of Trade under the Electric Lighting Acts 1882 to 1909 to the Mayor Aldermen and Burgesses of the Borough of Derby in respect of certain parishes in the Rural Districts of Shardlow Belper and Repton all in the county of Derby.	
	Doncaster Corporation Electric Lighting (Extension) Order 1913 Provisional Order granted by the Board of Trade under the Electric Lighting Acts 1882 to 1909 to the Mayor Aldermen and Burgesses of the Borough of Doncaster in respect of the Urban Districts of Bentley-with-Arksey and Balby-with-Hexthorpe in the West Riding of the County of York.	
	Ellesmere Port and Whitby Electric Lighting Order 1913 Provisional Order granted by the Board of Trade under the Electric Lighting Acts 1882 to 1909 to the Urban District Council of Ellesmere Port and Whitby in respect of the Urban District of Ellesmere Port and Whitby in the County of Chester	
	Kingswear Electric Lighting Order 1913 Provisional Order granted by the Board of Trade under the Electric Lighting Acts 1882 to 1909 to the Urban Electric Supply Company Limited in respect of a part of the Parish of Kingswear in the Rural District of Totnes in the County of Devon.	
	Leatherhead and District Electric Lighting (Extension) Order 1913 Provisional Order granted by the Board of Trade under the Electric Lighting Acts 1882 to 1909 to the Leatherhead and District Electricity Company Limited in respect of the Parishes of Cobham Stoke d'Abernon Great Bookham and Little Bookham in the Rural District of Epsom and the Parish of Effingham in the Rural District of Dorking.	
	Mid-Sussex Electric Lighting Order 1913 Provisional Order granted by the Board of Trade under the Electric Lighting Acts 1882 to 1909 to the Mid-Sussex Electric Light and Power Company Limited in respect of the Urban Districts of Cuckfield and Haywards Heath and portions of the Parishes of Lindfield and Cuckfield Rural in the Rural District of Cuckfield all in the County of Sussex.	
	Northwood and Ruislip Electric Lighting (Extension) Order 1913 Provisional Order granted by the Board of Trade under the Electric Lighting Acts 1882 to 1909 to the Northwood Electric Light and Power Company Limited in respect of parts of the Parishes of Watford Rural and Rickmansworth Rural in the Rural District of Watford in the County of Herts.	
Electric Lighting Orders Confirmation (No. 3) Act 1913 (repealed)	3 & 4 Geo. 5. c. cli	15 August 1913
An Act to confirm certain Provisional Orders made by the Board of Trade under the Electric Lighting Acts 1882 to 1909 relating to Lossiemouth and Branderburgh Maxwelltown and Port Glasgow. (Repealed by North of Scotland Electricity Order Confirmation Act 1958 (7 & 8 Eliz. 2. c. ii))
	Lossiemouth and Branderburgh Electric Lighting Order 1913 Provisional Order granted by the Board of Trade under the Electric Lighting Acts 1882 to 1909 to the Provost Magistrates and Councillors of the Burgh of Lossiemouth in the county of Elgin in respect of the said burgh.	
	Maxwelltown Electric Lighting Order 1913 Provisional Order granted by the Board of Trade under the Electric Lighting Acts 1882 to 1909 to the Dumfries Electricity Supply Company Limited in respect of the Burgh of Maxwelltown in the Stewartry or County of Kirkcudbright.	
	Port Glasgow Electric Lighting Order 1913 Provisional Order granted by the Board of Trade under the Electric Lighting Acts 1882 to 1909 to the Provost Magistrates and Councillors of the Burgh of Port Glasgow in respect of the Burgh of Port Glasgow in the County of Renfrew.	
Electric Lighting Orders Confirmation (No. 4) Act 1913	3 & 4 Geo. 5. c. clii	15 August 1913
An Act to confirm certain Provisional Orders made by the Board of Trade under the Electric Lighting Acts 1882 to 1909 relating to Lytham Marlborough Menai Bridge Neath Rural District (Extension) Sevenoaks and District Stroud and Wolverhampton (Extension).
	Lytham Urban District Council Electric Lighting Order 1913 Provisional Order granted by the Board of Trade under the Electric Lighting Acts 1882 to 1909 to the Urban District Council of Lytham in respect of the Urban District of Lytham in the County of Lancaster.	
	Marlborough Electric Lighting Order 1913 Provisional Order granted by the Board of Trade under the Electric Lighting Acts 1882 to 1909 to the Marlborough Electric Supply Company Limited in respect of the Borough of Marlborough in the County of Wilts.	
	Menai Bridge Electric Lighting Order 1913 Provisional Order granted by the Board of Trade under the Electric Lighting Acts 1882 to 1909 to the Menai Bridge Electricity Supply Company Limited in respect of the Urban District of Menai Bridge and the Parish of Llandegfan in the Rural District of Acthwy both in the County of Anglesey.	
	Neath Rural District Electric Lighting (Extension) Order 1913 Provisional Order granted by the Board of Trade under the Electric Lighting Acts 1882 to 1909 to the Rural District Council of Neath in respect of the Parishes or Hamlets of Dylais Higher Neath Higher Neath Lower Resolven Clyne and Blaengwrach and part of the Parish or Hamlet of Rhigos all in the Rural District of Neath in the County of Glamorgan.	
	Sevenoaks and District Electric Lighting Order 1913 Provisional Order granted by the Board of Trade under the Electric Lighting Acts 1882 to 1909 to the Sevenoaks and District Electricity Company Limited in respect of the Urban District of Sevenoaks and part of the Rural District of Sevenoaks in the County of Kent and part of the Rural District of Godstone in the County of Surrey.	
	Stroud Electric Lighting Order 1913 Provisional Order granted by the Board of Trade under the Electric Lighting Acts 1882 to 1909 to James Herbert Edwards in respect of the Urban District of Stroud in the County of Gloucester.	
	Wolverhampton Electric Lighting (Extension) Order 1913 Provisional Order granted by the Board of Trade under the Electric Lighting Acts 1882 to 1909 to the Mayor Aldermen and Burgesses of the Borough of Wolverhampton in respect of the Parish of Bushbury in the Rural District of Cannock in the County of Stafford.	
Electric Lighting Orders Confirmation (No. 5) Act 1913	3 & 4 Geo. 5. c. cliii	15 August 1913
An Act to confirm certain Provisional Orders made by the Board of Trade under the Electric Lighting Acts 1882 to 1909 relating to Caerphilly Pinner Smethwick (Amendment) Watford (Extension) and Wellingborough (Amendment).
	Caerphilly Electric Lighting Order 1913 Provisional Order granted by the Board of Trade under the Electric Lighting Acts 1882 to 1909 to James Herbert Edwards in respect of part of the urban district of Caerphilly in the county of Glamorgan.	
	Pinner Electric Lighting Order 1913 Provisional Order granted by the Board of Trade under the Electric Lighting Acts 1882 to 1909 to the Colne Valley Electric Supply Company Limited in respect of the parish of Pinner in the rural district of Hendon in the county of Middlesex.	
	Smethwick Electric Lighting Order 1913 Provisional Order granted by the Board of Trade under the Electric Lighting Acts 1882 to 1909 to the Birmingham District Power and Traction Company Limited in respect of the county borough of Smethwick in the county of Stafford.	
	Watford Electric Lighting (Extension) Order 1913 Provisional Order granted by the Board of Trade under the Electric Lighting Acts 1882 to 1909 to the Urban District Council of Watford in respect of the parish of Abbots Langley and parts of the parish of Watford Rural all in the rural district of Watford in the county of Hertford.	
	Wellingborough Electric Lighting Order 1913 Provisional Order granted by the Board of Trade under the Electric Lighting Acts 1882 to 1909 to the Wellingborough Electric Supply Company Limited in respect of the urban district of Wellingborough in the county of Northampton.	
Electric Lighting Order Confirmation (No. 6) Act 1913	3 & 4 Geo. 5. c. cliv	15 August 1913
An Act to confirm a Provisional Order made by the Board of Trade under the Electric Lighting Acts 1882 to 1909 relating to Portrush.
	Portrush Electric Lighting Order 1913 Provisional Order granted by the Board of Trade under the Electric Lighting Acts 1882 to 1909 to the urban district council of Portrush in respect of the urban district of Portrush in the county of Antrim.	
Electric Lighting Order Confirmation (No. 7) Act 1913	3 & 4 Geo. 5. c. clv	15 August 1913
An Act to confirm a Provisional Order made by the Board of Trade under the Electric Lighting Acts 1882 to 1909 relating to Romford and District.
	Romford and District Electric Lighting Order 1913 Provisional Order granted by the Board of Trade under the Electric Lighting Acts 1882 to 1909 to the County of London Electric Supply Company Limited in respect of the urban districts of Romford and Tilbury and the rural districts of Orsett and Romford in the county of Essex.	
Dunfermline District Water Order Confirmation Act 1913 (repealed)	3 & 4 Geo. 5. c. clvi	15 August 1913
An Act to confirm a Provisional Order under the Private Legislation Procedure (Scotland) Act 1899 relating to Dunfermline District Water. (Repealed by Statute Law (Repeals) Act 1986 (c. 12))
	Dunfermline District Water Order 1913 Provisional Order to authorise the Dunfermline District Committee of the County Council of the county of Fife to construct additional waterworks to confer further powers on the said District Committee and the County Council of the county of Fife in relation to their water undertaking under the Dunfermline District Water Order 1904 and for other purposes.	
Dunfermline Corporation Water Order Confirmation Act 1913	3 & 4 Geo. 5. c. clvii	15 August 1913
An Act to confirm a Provisional Order under the Private Legislation Procedure (Scotland) Act 1899 relating to Dunfermline Corporation Water.
	Dunfermline Corporation Water Order 1913 Provisional Order to authorise the Provost Magistrates and Councillors of the City and Royal Burgh of Dunfermline to obtain an additional Water Supply; to extend the limits of compulsory supply; to borrow money; and for other purposes.	
Wemyss Tramways Order Confirmation Act 1913	3 & 4 Geo. 5. c. clviii	15 August 1913
An Act to confirm a Provisional Order under the Private Legislation Procedure (Scotland) Act 1899 relating to Wemyss Tramways.
	Wemyss Tramways Order 1913 Provisional Order to extend the period limited by the Wemyss Tramways (Extensions) Order 1910 for the compulsory purchase of lands and for other purposes.	
Kirkcaldy and Dysart Water Order Confirmation Act 1913 (repealed)	3 & 4 Geo. 5. c. clix	15 August 1913
An Act to confirm a Provisional Order under the Private Legislation Procedure (Scotland) Act 1899 relating to Kirkcaldy and Dysart Water. (Repealed by Kirkcaldy Corporation Order Confirmation Act 1939 (2 & 3 Geo. 6. c. vi))
	Kirkcaldy and Dysart Water Order 1913 Provisional Order to authorise the Waterworks Commissioners of Kirkcaldy and Dysart to make and maintain additional works for providing an increased water supply and for other purposes.	
Lanarkshire (Middle Ward District) Water Order Confirmation Act 1913 (repealed)	3 & 4 Geo. 5. c. clx	15 August 1913
An Act to confirm a Provisional Order under the Private Legislation Procedure (Scotland) Act 1899 relating to Lanarkshire (Middle Ward District) Water. (Repealed by Statute Law (Repeals) Act 1986 (c. 12))
	Lanarkshire (Middle Ward District) Water Order 1913 Provisional Order to authorise the District Committee of the Middle Ward of the county of Lanark to construct additional waterworks to abandon the authorised Glengavel Reservoir to extend the water supply limits of the District Committee to amend the Lanarkshire (Middle Ward District) Water Acts 1892 to 1908 to authorise the County Council of the said county to levy assessments and to borrow money and for other purposes.	
Airdrie Corporation Gas Order Confirmation Act 1913	3 & 4 Geo. 5. c. clxi	15 August 1913
An Act to confirm a Provisional Order under the Private Legislation Procedure (Scotland) Act 1899 relating to Airdrie Corporation Gas.
	Airdrie Corporation Gas Order 1913 Provisional Order to extend the limits for the supply of Gas by and to confer further powers on the Provost Magistrates and Councillors of the Burgh of Airdrie in connection with their Gas Undertaking.	
Trade Boards Provisional Orders Confirmation Act 1913 (repealed)	3 & 4 Geo. 5. c. clxii	15 August 1913
An Act to confirm certain Provisional Orders made by the Board of Trade under the Trade Boards Act 1909. (Note: Trade Boards Act 1909 (9 Edw. 7. c. 22)) (Repealed by Wages Councils Act 1945 (8 & 9 Geo. 6. c. 17))
	Trade Boards (Sugar Confectionery and Food Preserving) Order 1913. Provisional Order made in pursuance of Section One of the Trade Boards Act 1909 with respect to the Sugar Confectionery and Food Preserving Trade.	
	Trade Boards (Shirtmaking) Order 1913 Provisional Order made in pursuance of Section One of the Trade Boards Act 1909 with respect to the Shirt-making Trade.	
	Trade Boards (Hollow-ware) Order 1913 Provisional Order made in pursuance of Section One of the Trade Boards Act 1909 with respect to the Hollow-ware making Trade.	
	Trade Boards (Linen and Cotton Embroidery) Order 1913 Provisional Order made in pursuance of Section One of the Trade Boards Act 1909 with respect to the Linen and Cotton Embroidery Trade.	
Local Authorities Contributions (Crystal Palace) Act 1913 (repealed)	3 & 4 Geo. 5. c. clxiii	15 August 1913
An Act to authorise certain Local Authorities to contribute towards the cost of the acquisition of the Crystal Palace Sydenham. (Repealed by London County Council (Crystal Palace) Act 1951 (14 & 15 Geo. 6. c. xxviii))
Ribble Fisheries Provisional Order Confirmation Act 1913	3 & 4 Geo. 5. c. clxiv	15 August 1913
An Act to confirm a Provisional Order under the Salmon and Freshwater Fisheries Act 1907 (Note: Salmon and Freshwater Fisheries Act 1907 (7 Edw. 7. c. 15)) relating to the River Ribble and other waters.
	Ribble Fisheries Provisional Order 1913 Ribble Fisheries Provisional Order 1913.	
Pilotage Order (London) Confirmation Act 1913 (repealed)	3 & 4 Geo. 5. c. clxv	15 August 1913
An Act to confirm a Pilotage Order made by the Board of Trade under the Pilotage Act 1913 (Note: Pilotage Act 1913 (2 & 3 Geo. 5. c. 31)) relating to the London District of the Corporation of the Trinity House of Deptford Strond. (Repealed by Statute Law (Repeals) Act 1995 (c. 44))
	London Pilotage Order 1913 Pilotage Order for the London Pilotage District.	
Wibsey (Bradford) Independent Chapel Scheme Confirmation Act 1913	3 & 4 Geo. 5. c. clxvi	15 August 1913
An Act to confirm a Scheme of the Charity Commissioners for the application or management of the Charity consisting of the Independent Chapel School and Trust Property at Wibsey in the Township of North Bierley in the City of Bradford.
	Scheme for the Application or Management of the Charity consisting of the Independent Chapel School and Trust Property at Wibsey in the Ancient township of North Bierley in the City of Bradford comprised in the following indentures or one of them:— Indenture dated 22nd December 1869: Indenture dated 12th February 1883.	
Padiham Horeb Union Church Scheme Confirmation Act 1913	3 & 4 Geo. 5. c. clxvii	15 August 1913
An Act to confirm a Scheme of the Charity Commissioners for the application or management of the Charity consisting of the Horeb Union Church and Trust Property in the Ancient Township of Padiham in the Ancient Parish of Whalley in the County of Lancaster.
	Scheme for the Application or Management of the Charity consisting of the Horeb Union Church and Trust Property in the Ancient Township of Padiham in the Ancient Parish of Whalley in the County of Lancaster comprised in a Deed Poll of Declaration of Trust dated Sth February 1896.	
Hulme Trust Estates Scheme Confirmation Act 1913	3 & 4 Geo. 5. c. clxviii	15 August 1913
An Act to confirm a Scheme of the Charity Commissioners for the application or management of the Charity called the Hulme Trust Estates (Non-Educational) in the County of Lancaster and elsewhere.
	Scheme for the Application or Management of the Hulme Truşt Estates (Non-Educational).	
Roe Street (Macclesfield) Congregational Chapel Scheme Confirmation Act 1913	3 & 4 Geo. 5. c. clxix	15 August 1913
An Act to confirm a Scheme of the Charity Commissioners for the application or management of the Charity consisting of the Congregational Chapel and Trust Property in Roe Street in the Ancient Township of Macclesfield in the Ancient Parish of Prestbury in the County of Chester.
	Scheme for the Application or Management of the Charity consisting of the Congregational Chapel and Trust Property in Roe Street in the Ancient Township of Macclesfield in the Ancient Parish of Prestbury in the County of Chester comprised in an Indenture dated 17th May 1830.	
Hatfield (York, West Riding) Calvinistic Chapel Scheme Confirmation Act 1913	3 & 4 Geo. 5. c. clxx	15 August 1913
An Act to confirm a Scheme of the Charity Commissioners for the application or management of the Charity consisting of the Calvinistic Chapel at Hatfield, in the West Riding of the County of York.
	Scheme for the Application or Management of the Charity consisting of the Calvinistic Chapel at Hatfield in the West Riding of the County of York.	
Kingswood Chapel Scheme Confirmation Act 1913	3 & 4 Geo. 5. c. clxxi	15 August 1913
An Act to confirm a Scheme of the Charity Commissioners for the application or management of the Charity consisting of the Chapel at Kingswood in the Ancient Parishes of Banstead and Ewell in the County of Surrey.
	Scheme for the application or management of the Charity consisting of the Chapel at Kingswood in the Ancient Parishes of Banstead and Ewell in the County of Surrey comprised in an Indenture dated the fifth of March one thousand eight hundred and seventy-five.	
Great Haywood and Tompkin Congregational Chapels Scheme Confirmation Act 1913	3 & 4 Geo. 5. c. clxxii	15 August 1913
An Act to confirm a Scheme of the Charity Commissioners for the application or management of the following Charities in the County of Stafford (1) the Charity consisting of the Congregational Chapel in the Ancient Township of Great Haywood in the Ancient Parish of Colwich (2) the Charity consisting of the Congregational Chapel in Tompkin in the Township of Bagnall in the Parish of Stoke-upon-Trent.
	Scheme for the application or management of the following Charities in the County of Stafford:—: 1. The Charity consisting of the Congregational Chapel in the Ancient Township of Great Haywood in the Ancient Parish of Colwich: 2. The Charity consisting of the Congregational Chapel in Tompkin in the Township of Bagnall in the Parish of Stoke-upon-Trent.	
Bosden Wesleyan Trust Property Charity Scheme Confirmation Act 1913	3 & 4 Geo. 5. c. clxxiii	15 August 1913
An Act to confirm a Scheme of the Charity Commissioners for the application or management of the School Burial Ground Wesleyan Place of Worship and Trust Property at Hazel Grove in Bosden in the County of Chester.
	Scheme for the Application or Management of the School Burial Ground Wesleyan Place of Worship and Trust Property at Hazel Grove in Bosden in the County of Chester.	
Preston, Southport and Gatley Chapels Scheme Confirmation Act 1913	3 & 4 Geo. 5. c. clxxiv	15 August 1913
An Act to confirm a Scheme of the Charity Commissioners for the application or management of the following Charities:—(1) the Charity of the Congregational Chapel School and Trust Property in Grimshaw Street in the Borough of Preston in the County of Lancaster (2) the Charity consisting of the West End Congregational Chapel School and Trust Property in the Borough of Southport in the said county and (3) the Charity consisting of the Congregational Chapel School and Trust Property at Gatley in the Ancient Parish of Stockport in the County of Chester
	Scheme for the Application or Management of the following Charities:—: 1. The Charity consisting of the Congregational chapel school and trust property in Grimshaw Street in the borough of Preston in the county of Lancaster: 2. The Charity consisting of the West End Congregational chapel school and trust property in the borough of Southport in the said county: 3. The Charity consisting of the Congregational chapel school and trust property at Gatley in the ancient parish of Stockport in the county of Chester.	
Bournemouth Hospitals Scheme Confirmation Act 1913 (repealed)	3 & 4 Geo. 5. c. clxxv	15 August 1913
An Act to confirm a scheme of the Charity Commissioners for the application or management of the following Charities in the Borough of Bournemouth in the County of Southampton (1) the Charity called or known as the Royal Victoria Hospital (2) the Charity called or known as the Royal Boscombe and West Hants Hospital. (Repealed by Statute Law (Repeals) Act 2013 (c. 2))
	Scheme for the Application or Management of the following Charities in the Borough of Bournemouth in the County of Southampton:—: 1. The Charity called or known as the Royal Victoria Hospital; 2. The Charity called or known as the Royal Boscombe and West Hants Hospital.	
Alfriston Chapel Charity Scheme Confirmation Act 1913	3 & 4 Geo. 5. c. clxxvi	15 August 1913
An Act to confirm a Scheme of the Charity Commissioners for the application or management of the Charity consisting of the following endowments in the Parish of Alfriston in the County of Sussex (1) the Chapel and Trust Property comprised in Indentures dated respectively ninth and tenth day of September one thousand eight hundred third and fourth day of April one thousand eight hundred and eleven and twenty-ninth and thirtieth day of July one thousand eight hundred and twenty-four and (2) the Minister's House comprised in an Indenture dated ninth day of October one thousand eight hundred and thirty-three.
	Scheme for the Application or Management of the Charity consisting of the following Endowments in the Parish of Alfriston in the County of Sussex: 1. The Chapel and Trust Property comprised in Indentures dated respectively 9th and 10th September 1800 3rd and 4th April 1811 and 29th and 30th July 1824; and 2. The Minister's House comprised in an Indenture dated 9th October 1833.	

=== Private and personal acts ===
Short title	Citation	Royal assent
Long title
Conyngham Heirlooms Act 1913	3 & 4 Geo. 5. c. 1 Pr.	15 August 1913
An Act to authorise the sale of certain pictures bequeathed by the will of the late Most Honourable Jane St. Maur Blanche Dowager Marchioness Conyngham as heirlooms and to declare the trusts of the proceeds of such sale and for other purposes.
Gomm Heirlooms Act 1913	3 & 4 Geo. 5. c. 2 Pr.	15 August 1913
An Act to authorise the sale of personal chattles bequeathed by the Will of the late Dame Elizabeth Ann Gomm as heirlooms and to declare the trusts of the proceeds of such sale and for other purposes.
Lord Wimborne's Estate Act 1913	3 & 4 Geo. 5. c. 3 Pr.	15 August 1913
An Act to confirm certain conveyances leases and other dispositions and dealings of or in relation to the estates in the counties of Dorset and Glamorgan of the Right Honourable Ivor Bertie Baron Wimborne and the Right Honourable Ivor Churchill Baron Ashby St. Ledgers.
Aldbar Trust Estates Act 1913	3 & 4 Geo. 5. c. 4 Pr.	15 August 1913
An Act to authorise the sale of certain lands held by the Trustees of the late John Inglis Chalmers Esquire of Aldbar in the county of Forfar and the investment of the proceeds of sale and for other purposes.
MacColl's Divorce Act 1913 (Note: This act was not printed by the King's Printer)	3 & 4 Geo. 5. c. 5 Pr.	4 July 1913
An Act to dissolve the marriage of George Edwardes MacColl of Kirkliston Drive Bloomfield in the county city of Belfast in Ireland engineer with Mary MacColl his now wife and to enable him to marry again and for other purposes.
Carolin's Divorce Act 1913	3 & 4 Geo. 5. c. 6 Pr.	15 August 1913
An Act to dissolve the marriage of Charlotte Carolin with Thomas John Carolin her now husband and to enable her to marry again and for other purposes.
Dooner's Divorce Act 1913	3 & 4 Geo. 5. c. 7 Pr.	15 August 1913
An Act to dissolve the marriage of Emily Ernestine Dooner with William Dundas Dooner her present husband and to enable her to marry again and for other purposes.
McBride's Divorce Act 1913	3 & 4 Geo. 5. c. 8 Pr.	15 August 1913
An Act to dissolve the marriage of Violet McBride of 70 Seymour Place Bryanston Square in the county of London with William McBride her husband and to enable her to marry again and for other purposes.

=== Sources ===
- 3 & 4 George V - 1913. H. M. Stationery Office – via HathiTrust.

== See also ==
- List of acts of the Parliament of the United Kingdom
