= List of acts of the Parliament of the United Kingdom from 1884 =

This is a complete list of acts of the Parliament of the United Kingdom for the year 1884.

The first parliament of the United Kingdom was held in 1801; parliaments between 1707 and 1800 were either parliaments of Great Britain or of Ireland.

The number shown after each act's title is its chapter number. Acts passed before 1963 are cited using this number, preceded by the year(s) of the reign during which the relevant parliamentary session was held; thus the Union with Ireland Act 1800 is cited as "39 & 40 Geo. 3 c. 67", meaning the 67th act passed during the session that started in the 39th year of the reign of George III and which finished in the 40th year of that reign. Note that the modern convention is to use Arabic numerals in citations (thus "41 Geo. 3" rather than "41 Geo. III").

All modern acts have a short title, e.g. the Local Government Act 2003. Some earlier acts also have a short title given to them by later acts, such as by the Short Titles Act 1896.

== 47 & 48 Vict. ==
The fifth session of the 22nd Parliament of the United Kingdom, which met from 5 February 1884 until 14 August 1884.

=== Public general acts ===
Short title	Citation	Royal assent
Long title
Annuity (Sir H. Brand) Act 1884 (repealed)	47 & 48 Vict. c. 1	24 March 1884
An Act for settling and securing an Annuity upon the Right Honourable Sir Henry Bouverie William Brand, G.C.B., in consideration of his eminent Services. (Repealed by Statute Law Revision Act 1898 (61 & 62 Vict. c. 22))
National Debt Act 1884 (repealed)	47 & 48 Vict. c. 2	24 March 1884
An Act to make further provision respecting the Conversion into Two and a half per Cent. Annuities of Three per Cent. Annuities held by the National Debt Commissioners on account of Savings Banks, and for the Redemption of the Indian Loan Annuity, 1881. (Repealed by National Debt and Local Loans Act 1887 (50 & 51 Vict. c. 16) and Statute Law Revision Act 1950 (14 Geo. 6. c. 6))
London Brokers' Relief Act 1884 (repealed)	47 & 48 Vict. c. 3	24 March 1884
An Act for the Relief of the Brokers of the City of London. (Repealed by Statute Law Revision Act 1898 (61 & 62 Vict. c. 22))
Consolidated Fund (No. 1) Act 1884 (repealed)	47 & 48 Vict. c. 4	28 March 1884
An Act to apply certain sums out of the Consolidated Fund to the service of the years ending on the thirty-first day of March one thousand eight hundred and eighty-three, one thousand eight hundred and eighty-four, and one thousand eight hundred and eighty-five. (Repealed by Statute Law Revision Act 1898 (61 & 62 Vict. c. 22))
Valuation (Metropolis) Amendment Act 1884 (repealed)	47 & 48 Vict. c. 5	28 March 1884
An Act to amend the Valuation (Metropolis) Act, 1869, (Note: Valuation (Metropolis) Act 1869 (32 & 33 Vict. c. 67)) by giving greater facilities for appeal to owners and lessees of houses paying rates and taxes in the place of the occupiers. (Repealed by Local Government Act 1948 (11 & 12 Geo. 6. c. 26))
Dublin Science and Art Museum Act 1884	47 & 48 Vict. c. 6	28 April 1884
An Act to confer further powers upon the Commissioners of Public Works in Ireland of acquiring lands in Dublin for all or any of the purposes of the Dublin Science and Art Museum Act, 1877. (Note: Dublin Science and Art Museum Act 1877 (40 & 41 Vict. c. ccxxxiv))
Isle of Man Harbours Act 1884 (repealed)	47 & 48 Vict. c. 7	28 April 1884
An Act for amending the Isle of Man Harbours Acts, 1872 (Note: Isle of Man Harbours Act 1872 (35 & 36 Vict. c. 23)) and 1874. (Note: Isle of Man Harbours Act 1874 (37 & 38 Vict. c. 8)) (Repealed by Harbours (Isle of Man) Act 1961 (An Act of Tynwald))
Army (Annual) Act 1884 (repealed)	47 & 48 Vict. c. 8	28 April 1884
An Act to provide, during twelve months, for the Discipline and Regulation of the Army. (Repealed by Statute Law Revision Act 1898 (61 & 62 Vict. c. 22) and Revision of the Army and Air Force Acts (Transitional Provisions) Act 1955 (3 & 4 Eliz. 2. c. 20))
Bankruptcy Appeals (County Courts) Act 1884 (repealed)	47 & 48 Vict. c. 9	28 April 1884
An Act to amend the Law as to Appeals in Bankruptcy from County Courts. (Repealed by Bankruptcy Act 1914 (4 & 5 Geo. 5. c. 59))
Trustee Churches (Ireland) Act 1884	47 & 48 Vict. c. 10	28 April 1884
An Act to amend the Irish Church Act, 1869; (Note: Irish Church Act 1869 (32 & 33 Vict. c. 42)) and for other purposes.
Freshwater Fisheries Act 1884 (repealed)	47 & 48 Vict. c. 11	19 May 1884
An Act for the further Protection of Fish other than Salmon in Fresh Waters. (Repealed by Salmon and Freshwater Fisheries Act 1923 (13 & 14 Geo. 5. c. 16))
Public Health (Confirmation of Byelaws) Act 1884 (repealed)	47 & 48 Vict. c. 12	19 May 1884
An Act to amend the Public Health Act, 1875, (Note: Public Health Act 1875 (38 & 39 Vict. c. 55)) so far as relates to the Confirmation of Byelaws. (Repealed by Statute Law (Repeals) Act 1975 (c. 10))
Contagious Diseases (Animals) Act 1884 (repealed)	47 & 48 Vict. c. 13	19 May 1884
An Act to amend the Contagious Diseases (Animals) Act, 1878. (Note: Contagious Diseases (Animals) Act 1878 (41 & 42 Vict. c. 74)) (Repealed by Diseases of Animals Act 1894 (57 & 58 Vict. c. 57))
Married Women's Property Act 1884 (repealed)	47 & 48 Vict. c. 14	23 June 1884
An Act to amend the sixteenth section of the Married Women's Property Act, 1882. (Note: Married Women's Property Act 1882 (45 & 46 Vict. c. 75)) (Repealed by Theft Act 1968 (c. 60))
Consolidated Fund (No. 2) Act 1884 (repealed)	47 & 48 Vict. c. 15	23 June 1884
An Act to apply the sum of six million five hundred and nineteen thousand three hundred and sixty-eight pounds out of the Consolidated Fund to the service of the year ending on the thirty-first day of March one thousand eight hundred and eighty-five. (Repealed by Statute Law Revision Act 1898 (61 & 62 Vict. c. 22))
Bankruptcy Frauds and Disabilities (Scotland) Act 1884 (repealed)	47 & 48 Vict. c. 16	23 June 1884
An Act to apply to Scotland certain provisions of the Bankruptcy Act, 1883. (Note: Bankruptcy Act 1883 (46 & 47 Vict. c. 52)) (Repealed by Bankruptcy (Scotland) Act 1913 (3 & 4 Geo. 5. c. 20))
Metropolitan Police Act 1884 (repealed)	47 & 48 Vict. c. 17	23 June 1884
An Act to provide for the appointment of an additional Assistant Commissioner of Police of the Metropolis and for other purposes relating to the Commissioner and Assistant Commissioners of such Police. (Repealed by Statute Law (Repeals) Act 1973 (c. 39))
Settled Land Act 1884	47 & 48 Vict. c. 18	3 July 1884
An Act to amend the Settled Land Act, 1882. (Note: Settled Land Act 1882 (45 & 46 Vict. c. 38)) (Repealed for England and Wales by Settled Land Act 1925 (15 & 16 Geo. 5. c. 18))
Summary Jurisdiction over Children (Ireland) Act 1884 (repealed)	47 & 48 Vict. c. 19	3 July 1884
An Act to amend the Summary Jurisdiction (Ireland) Acts so far as they relate to Children and young Persons. (Repealed by Children and Young Persons Act (Northern Ireland) 1950 (c. 5 (N.I.)))
Greek Marriages Act 1884 (repealed)	47 & 48 Vict. c. 20	3 July 1884
An Act to remove Doubts as to the Validity of certain Marriages of Members of the Greek Church in England. (Repealed by Family Law Act 1986 (c. 55))
Sea and Coast Fisheries Fund (Ireland) Act 1884 (repealed)	47 & 48 Vict. c. 21	3 July 1884
An Act to provide for the better administration of the Fund under the control of the Trustees to aid the Sea and Coast Fisheries of Ireland; and for other purposes in relation thereto. (Repealed by Statute Law Revision Act 1898 (61 & 62 Vict. c. 22) and Statute Law Revision Act (Northern Ireland) 1954 (c. 35 (N.I.)))
Loans for Schools and Training Colleges (Ireland) Act 1884 (repealed)	47 & 48 Vict. c. 22	3 July 1884
An Act to amend the Law relating to the Buildings of Non-vested National Schools and Training Colleges in Ireland. (Repealed by Administrative and Financial Provisions Act (Northern Ireland) 1952 (c. 7 (N.I.)))
National Debt (Conversion of Stock) Act 1884	47 & 48 Vict. c. 23	3 July 1884
An Act for giving Facilities for the Conversion of Three per Cent. Stock into Stock of a Lower Denomination, and for other purposes relating thereto.
Colonial Attorneys Relief Amendment Act 1884 (repealed)	47 & 48 Vict. c. 24	3 July 1884
An Act to amend the Colonial Attorneys Relief Act. (Note: Colonial Attornies Relief Act 1857 (20 & 21 Vict. c. 39)) (Note: Colonial Attorneys Relief Act 1874 (37 & 38 Vict. c. 41)) (Repealed by Colonial Solicitors Act 1900 (63 & 64 Vict. c. 14))
Customs and Inland Revenue Act 1884 (repealed)	47 & 48 Vict. c. 25	3 July 1884
An Act to grant certain Duties of Customs and Inland Revenue, to alter other Duties, and to amend the Laws relating to Customs and Inland Revenue. (Repealed by Statute Law Revision Act 1898 (61 & 62 Vict. c. 22))
Fisheries (Oyster, Crab, and Lobster) Act (1877) Amendment Act 1884 (repealed)	47 & 48 Vict. c. 26	14 July 1884
An Act to amend the Fisheries (Oyster, Crab, and Lobster) Act, 1877. (Note: Fisheries (Oyster, Crab, and Lobster) Act 1877) (Repealed by Sea Fisheries Regulation Act 1888 (51 & 52 Vict. c. 54))
Sea Fisheries Act 1884 (repealed)	47 & 48 Vict. c. 27	14 July 1884
An Act to further amend the Sea Fisheries Act, 1868. (Note: Sea Fisheries Act 1868 (31 & 32 Vict. c. 45)) (Repealed by Sea Fisheries (Shellfish) Act 1967 (c. 83))
Tramways and Public Companies (Ireland) Amendment Act 1884 (repealed)	47 & 48 Vict. c. 28	14 July 1884
An Act to amend the Tramways and Public Companies (Ireland) Act, 1883. (Note: Tramways and Public Companies (Ireland) Act 1883 (46 & 47 Vict. c. 43)) (Repealed by Statute Law Revision Act 1898 (61 & 62 Vict. c. 22))
Licensing (Evidence) Act 1884 (repealed)	47 & 48 Vict. c. 29	28 July 1884
An Act to extend Section forty-one of the Licensing Act, 1872. (Note: Licensing Act 1872 (35 & 36 Vict. c. 94)) (Repealed by Licensing (Consolidation) Act 1910 (10 Edw. 7 & 1 Geo. 5. c. 24))
Great Seal Act 1884	47 & 48 Vict. c. 30	28 July 1884
An Act to simplify the passing of Instruments under the Great Seal of the United Kingdom.
Colonial Prisoners Removal Act 1884	47 & 48 Vict. c. 31	28 July 1884
An Act to make further provision respecting the removal of Prisoners and Criminal Lunatics from Her Majesty's possessions out of the United Kingdom.
Royal Military Asylum Chelsea (Transfer) Act 1884 (repealed)	47 & 48 Vict. c. 32	28 July 1884
An Act for transferring the Royal Military Asylum at Chelsea from the Commissioners of Her Majesty's Woods, Forests, and Land Revenues to the Commissioners of Her Majesty's Works and Public Buildings. (Repealed by Statute Law Revision Act 1966 (c. 5))
Newcastle Chapter Act 1884 (repealed)	47 & 48 Vict. c. 33	28 July 1884
An Act to make provision for the foundation of a Dean and Chapter for the Bishopric of Newcastle, and for the transfer to the Cathedral Church of Newcastle of one of the canonries in the Cathedral Church of Durham, and for the transfer of certain ecclesiastical patronage to the Bishopric and Chapter of Newcastle, and for other purposes connected therewith. (Repealed by Cathedrals Measure 1963 (No. 2))
Elections (Hours of Poll) Act 1884 (repealed)	47 & 48 Vict. c. 34	28 July 1884
An Act to extend the Hours of Polling at Parliamentary and Municipal Elections in certain Boroughs. (Repealed by Elections (Hours of Poll) Act 1885 (48 & 49 Vict. c. 10))
County of Dublin Jurors' and Voters' Revision Act 1884 (repealed)	47 & 48 Vict. c. 35	28 July 1884
An Act to facilitate the Revision of Lists of Jurors and Voters, and the Registration of Voters, in the comity of Dublin. (Repealed by Statute Law (Repeals) Act 1993 (c. 50))
Prisons (Ireland) Amendment Act 1884 (repealed)	47 & 48 Vict. c. 36	28 July 1884
An Act to amend the General Prisons (Ireland) Act, 1877, (Note: General Prisons (Ireland) Act 1877 (40 & 41 Vict. c. 49)) in certain particulars. (Repealed by Statute Law Revision Act 1898 (61 & 62 Vict. c. 22) and Prison Act (Northern Ireland) 1953 (c. 18 (N.I.)))
Public Libraries Act 1884 (repealed)	47 & 48 Vict. c. 37	28 July 1884
An Act to amend the Public Libraries Acts. (Repealed for Scotland by Public Libraries Consolidation (Scotland) Act 1887 (50 & 51 Vict. c. 42), for England and Wales by Public Libraries Act 1892 (55 & 56 Vict. c. 53) (Note: Incorrectly cited as "Public Libraries, 1893 c 53" in the Chronological Table of the Statutes.) and for Northern Ireland by Museums (Northern Ireland) Order 1981 (SI 1981/438))
Indian Marine Service Act 1884 (repealed)	47 & 48 Vict. c. 38	28 July 1884
An Act to provide for the regulation of Her Majesty's Indian Marine Service. (Repealed by Government of India Act 1915 (5 & 6 Geo. 5. c. 61) and Government of India Act 1935 (26 Geo. 5 & 1 Edw. 8. c. 2))
Naval Discipline Act 1884 (repealed)	47 & 48 Vict. c. 39	28 July 1884
An Act to amend the Naval Discipline Act, 1866. (Note: Naval Discipline Act 1866 (29 & 30 Vict. c. 109)) (Repealed by Naval Discipline Act 1957 (5 & 6 Eliz. 2. c. 53))
Reformatory and Industrial Schools (Manx Children) Act 1884 (repealed)	47 & 48 Vict. c. 40	28 July 1884
An Act for enabling Manx Children to be sent to Reformatory or Industrial Schools in Great Britain. (Repealed by Children Act 1908 (8 Edw. 7. c. 67))
Building Societies Act 1884 (repealed)	47 & 48 Vict. c. 41	7 August 1884
An Act to amend the Building Societies Act, 1874. (Note: Building Societies Act 1874 (37 & 38 Vict. c. 42)) (Repealed for England and Wales and Scotland by Building Societies Act 1962 (10 & 11 Eliz. 2. c. 37) and for Northern Ireland by Building Societies Act (Northern Ireland) 1967 (c. 31 (N.I.)))
Sheriff Court Houses (Scotland) Amendment Act 1884 (repealed)	47 & 48 Vict. c. 42	7 August 1884
An Act to amend the Sheriff Court Houses Act, 1860. (Note: Sheriff Court Houses Act 1860 (23 & 24 Vict. c. 79)) (Repealed by Sheriff Courts (Scotland) Act 1971 (c. 58))
Summary Jurisdiction Act 1884 (repealed)	47 & 48 Vict. c. 43	7 August 1884
An Act to repeal divers Enactments rendered unnecessary by the Summary Jurisdiction Acts and other Acts relating to proceedings before Courts of Summary Jurisdiction, and to make further provision for the uniformity of Proceedings before those Courts. (Repealed by Magistrates' Courts Act 1952 (15 & 16 Geo. 6 & 1 Eliz. 2. c. 55))
Naval Pensions Act 1884	47 & 48 Vict. c. 44	7 August 1884
An Act to amend the Law respecting the Payment of Naval and Greenwich Hospital Pensions.
National School Teachers Amendment (Ireland) Act 1884 (repealed)	47 & 48 Vict. c. 45	7 August 1884
An Act to amend the National School Teachers (Ireland) Act, 1879, (Note: National School Teachers (Ireland) Act 1879 (42 & 43 Vict. c. 74)) in so far as it relates to the Loans for Teachers' Residences. (Repealed by Administrative and Financial Provisions Act (Northern Ireland) 1952 (c. 7 (N.I.)))
Naval Enlistment Act 1884 (repealed)	47 & 48 Vict. c. 46	7 August 1884
An Act to amend the Naval Enlistment Act, 1853, (Note: Naval Enlistment Act 1853 (16 & 17 Vict. c. 69)) and for other purposes connected therewith. (Repealed by Reserve Forces Act 1980 (c. 9))
Contagious Diseases (Animals) Transfer of Parts of Districts Act 1884 (repealed)	47 & 48 Vict. c. 47	7 August 1884
An Act to enable Local Authorities to transfer the whole or certain parts of their Districts for the purposes of the Contagious Diseases (Animals) Act, 1878, to the Districts of neighbouring Local Authorities. (Repealed by Diseases of Animals Act 1894 (57 & 58 Vict. c. 57))
Oyster Cultivation (Ireland) Act 1884 (repealed)	47 & 48 Vict. c. 48	7 August 1884
An Act to promote the Cultivation of Oysters in Ireland. (Repealed by Fisheries Act (Northern Ireland) 1966 (c. 17 (N.I.)))
Public Works Loans Act 1884 (repealed)	47 & 48 Vict. c. 49	7 August 1884
An Act to grant Money for the purpose of Loans by the Public Works Loan Commissioners and the Commissioners of Public Works in Ireland and of loans and purchases by the Irish Land Commission. (Repealed by Statute Law Revision Act 1898 (61 & 62 Vict. c. 22))
Metropolitan Board of Works (Money) Act 1884 (repealed)	47 & 48 Vict. c. 50	7 August 1884
An Act further to amend the Acts relating to the raising of Money by the Metropolitan Board of Works; and for other purposes. (Repealed by London County Council (Finance Consolidation) Act 1912 (2 & 3 Geo. 5. c. cv))
Prison Act 1884 (repealed)	47 & 48 Vict. c. 51	7 August 1884
An Act to remove doubts as to the powers of the Secretary of State in relation to the altering, enlarging, rebuilding, and building of Prisons, and appropriating any Building for a Prison. (Repealed by Prison Act 1952 (15 & 16 Geo. 6 & 1 Eliz. 2. c. 52))
Annual Turnpike Acts Continuance Act 1884 (repealed)	47 & 48 Vict. c. 52	7 August 1884
An Act to continue certain Turnpike Acts, and to repeal certain other Turnpike Acts; and for other purposes connected therewith. (Repealed by Statute Law (Repeals) Act 1981 (c. 19))
Expiring Laws Continuance Act 1884 (repealed)	47 & 48 Vict. c. 53	7 August 1884
An Act to continue various expiring Laws. (Repealed by Statute Law Revision Act 1898 (61 & 62 Vict. c. 22))
Yorkshire Registries Act 1884 (repealed)	47 & 48 Vict. c. 54	7 August 1884
An Act to consolidate and amend the law relating to the Registration of Deeds and other matters affecting lands and hereditaments within the North, East, and West Ridings of the County of York. (Repealed by Law of Property Act 1969 (c. 59) and Statute Law (Repeals) Act 1993 (c. 50))
Pensions and Yeomanry Pay Act 1884	47 & 48 Vict. c. 55	14 August 1884
An Act to make further provision with regard to the Pensions of Soldiers, and to the Pay and Pensions of the Yeomanry, and for other purposes.
Chartered Companies Act 1884 (repealed)	47 & 48 Vict. c. 56	14 August 1884
An Act to declare the Law relating to the Incorporation of Chartered Companies. (Repealed by Statute Law (Repeals) Act 1993 (c. 50))
Superannuation Act 1884 (repealed)	47 & 48 Vict. c. 57	14 August 1884
An Act to extend certain Powers given by the Superannuation Act Amendment Act, 1873. (Note: Superannuation Act Amendment Act 1873 (36 & 37 Vict. c. 23)) (Repealed by Superannuation Act 1914 (4 & 5 Geo. 5. c. 86), Superannuation Act (Northern Ireland) 1949 (c. 13 (N.I.)) and Statute Law Revision Act 1950 (14 Geo. 6. c. 6))
Prosecution of Offences Act 1884 (repealed)	47 & 48 Vict. c. 58	14 August 1884
An Act for amending the Prosecution of Offences Act, 1879. (Note: Prosecution of Offences Act 1879 (42 & 43 Vict. c. 22)) (Repealed by Prosecution of Offences Act 1979 (c. 31))
Cholera Hospitals (Ireland) Act 1884 (repealed)	47 & 48 Vict. c. 59	14 August 1884
An Act to enable sanitary authorities in Ireland to take possession of land for the erection of temporary Cholera Hospitals. (Repealed by Statute Law Revision Act 1898 (61 & 62 Vict. c. 22))
Metropolitan Asylum Board (Borrowing Powers) Act 1884 (repealed)	47 & 48 Vict. c. 60	14 August 1884
An Act to enable the Managers of the Metropolitan Asylums District to borrow for certain purposes of the Diseases Prevention (Metropolis) Act, 1883. (Note: Diseases Prevention (Metropolis) Act 1883 (46 & 47 Vict. c. 35)) (Repealed by Public Health (London) Act 1891 (54 & 55 Vict. c. 76))
Supreme Court of Judicature Act 1884 (repealed)	47 & 48 Vict. c. 61	14 August 1884
An Act to amend the Supreme Court of Judicature Acts; and for other purposes. (Repealed by Supreme Court of Judicature (Consolidation) Act 1925 (15 & 16 Geo. 5. c. 49))
Revenue Act 1884	47 & 48 Vict. c. 62	14 August 1884
An Act to amend the Law relating to the Customs and Inland Revenue and to the Audit of Public Accounts, and for other purposes connected with the Public Revenue and Expenditure.
Trusts (Scotland) Amendment Act 1884 (repealed)	47 & 48 Vict. c. 63	14 August 1884
An Act to amend the Trusts (Scotland) Act, 1867. (Note: Trusts (Scotland) Act 1867 (30 & 31 Vict. c. 97)) (Repealed by Trusts (Scotland) Act 1921 (11 & 12 Geo. 5. c. 58))
Criminal Lunatics Act 1884 (repealed)	47 & 48 Vict. c. 64	14 August 1884
An Act to consolidate and amend the Law relating to Criminal Lunatics. (Repealed by Mental Health Act 1959 (7 & 8 Eliz. 2. c. 72) and Mental Health Act (Northern Ireland) 1961 (c. 15 (N.I.)))
New Parishes Acts and Church Building Acts Amendment Act 1884 (repealed)	47 & 48 Vict. c. 65	14 August 1884
An Act to further amend the New Parishes Acts and the Church Building Acts. (Repealed by Isle of Man (Church Building and New Parishes) Act 1897 (60 & 61 Vict. c. 33), New Parishes Measure 1943 (6 & 7 Geo. 6. No. 1) and Statute Law (Repeals) Act 1974 (c. 22))
Bishopric of Bristol Act 1884	47 & 48 Vict. c. 66	14 August 1884
An Act to provide for the disunion of the Sees of Gloucester and Bristol, and the constitution of a separate Bishopric of Bristol.
Improvement of Lands (Ecclesiastical Benefices) Act 1884 (repealed)	47 & 48 Vict. c. 67	14 August 1884
An Act to prohibit charges for Improvements upon Ecclesiastical Lands otherwise than with the consent of the Patron and Bishop. (Repealed by Repair of Benefice Buildings Measure 1972 (No. 2))
Matrimonial Causes Act 1884 (repealed)	47 & 48 Vict. c. 68	14 August 1884
An Act to amend the Matrimonial Causes Acts. (Repealed by Supreme Court of Judicature (Consolidation) Act 1925 (15 & 16 Geo. 5. c. 49))
Cholera, &c. Protection (Ireland) Act 1884 (repealed)	47 & 48 Vict. c. 69	14 August 1884
An Act to make better provision against Cholera and other dangerous Epidemic Diseases. (Repealed by Health Services Act (Northern Ireland) 1948 (c. 3 (N.I.)))
Municipal Elections (Corrupt and Illegal Practices) Act 1884 (repealed)	47 & 48 Vict. c. 70	14 August 1884
An Act for the better Prevention of Corrupt and Illegal Practices at Municipal and other Elections. (Repealed by Statute Law (Repeals) Act 1978 (c. 45))
Intestates Estates Act 1884	47 & 48 Vict. c. 71	14 August 1884
An Act to amend the Law respecting the administration of the Personal Estate and the Escheat of the Real Estate of Deceased Persons; and for other purposes. (Repealed for England and Wales by Administration of Estates Act 1925 (15 & 16 Geo. 5. c. 23) and in part for Northern Ireland by Crown Estate Act 1961 (9 & 10 Eliz. 2. c. 55))
Disused Burial Grounds Act 1884	47 & 48 Vict. c. 72	14 August 1884
An Act for preventing the erection of Buildings on Disused Burial Grounds.
Appropriation Act 1884 (repealed)	47 & 48 Vict. c. 73	14 August 1884
An Act to apply a sum out of the Consolidated Fund to the service of the year ending on the thirty-first day of March one thousand eight hundred and eighty-five, and to appropriate the Supplies granted in this Session of Parliament. (Repealed by Statute Law Revision Act 1898 (61 & 62 Vict. c. 22))
Public Health (Officers) Act 1884 (repealed)	47 & 48 Vict. c. 74	14 August 1884
An Act to amend the Public Health Act, 1875, with respect to the Officers of Local Authorities. (Repealed by Local Government Act 1933 (23 & 24 Geo. 5. c. 51))
Canal Boats Act 1884 (repealed)	47 & 48 Vict. c. 75	14 August 1884
An Act to amend the Canal Boats Act, 1877. (Note: Canal Boats Act 1877 (40 & 41 Vict. c. 60)) (Repealed by Public Health Act 1936 (26 Geo. 5 & 1 Edw. 8. c. 49))
Post Office (Protection) Act 1884 (repealed)	47 & 48 Vict. c. 76	14 August 1884
An Act to amend the Law with respect to the Protection of the Post Office and to Offences committed in relation to the Post Office. (Repealed by Telecommunications Act 1984 (c. 12))
Public Health (Ireland) Amendment Act 1884 (repealed)	47 & 48 Vict. c. 77	14 August 1884
An Act to amend the Public Health (Ireland) Act, 1878, (Note: Public Health (Ireland) Act 1878 (41 & 42 Vict. c. 52)) with reference to Sanitary Districts. (Repealed by Local Government Act (Northern Ireland) 1972 (c. 9 (N.I.)))
Corrupt Practices (Suspension of Elections) Act 1884 (repealed)	47 & 48 Vict. c. 78	14 August 1884
An Act to suspend, on account of Corrupt Practices, the issue during the prorogation of Parliament of writs for the holding of an Election of a Member or Members to serve in the present Parliament for certain cities and boroughs. (Repealed by Statute Law Revision Act 1898 (61 & 62 Vict. c. 22))

=== Local acts ===
Short title	Citation	Royal assent
Long title
Stopsley Marriage Legalization Act 1884 (repealed)	47 & 48 Vict. c. i	24 March 1884
An Act for legalizing Marriages heretofore solemnized in the District Church of Stopsley, in the Parish of Luton, in the County of Bedford. (Repealed by Statute Law (Repeals) Act 1977 (c. 18))
Metropolitan Commons Supplemental Act 1884	47 & 48 Vict. c. ii	28 April 1884
An Act to confirm a Scheme under the Metropolitan Commons Act, 1866, (Note: Metropolitan Commons Act 1866 (29 & 30 Vict. c. 122)) and the Metropolitan Commons (Amendment) Act, 1869, (Note: Metropolitan Commons (Amendment) Act 1869 (32 & 33 Vict. c. 107)) relating to Streatham Common.
	Streatham Common Scheme.	
City of Norwich Mousehold Heath Scheme Confirmation Act 1884 (repealed)	47 & 48 Vict. c. iii	28 April 1884
An Act to confirm a scheme under the City of Norwich Act, 1867, (Note: City of Norwich Act 1867 (30 & 31 Vict. c. cii)) relating to Mousehold Heath, in the county of the city of Norwich. (Repealed by Norwich City Council Act 1984 (c. xxiii))
	Scheme certified by the Land Commissioners for England under the City of Norwich Act 1867 on the 20th day of December 1883.	
Local Government Board's Provisional Orders Confirmation Act 1884	47 & 48 Vict. c. iv	28 April 1884
An Act to confirm certain Provisional Orders of the Local Government Board relating to the Local Government Districts of Bognor, Ealing, and Henley.
	Bognor Order 1884	
	Ealing Order 1884	
	Henley Order 1884	
Sion College Act 1884 (repealed)	47 & 48 Vict. c. v	28 April 1884
An Act for enabling the President and Fellows of Sion College within the City of London to acquire a new site for the buildings of the said College from the Mayor Commonalty and Citizens of the City of London; and for other purposes. (Repealed by Sion College Act 1956 (4 & 5 Eliz. 2. c. li))
Railway Clearing System Superannuation Fund Association Act 1884	47 & 48 Vict. c. vi	28 April 1884
An Act to amend the Railway Clearing System Superannuation Fund Association Act 1873; (Note: Railway Clearing System Superannuation Fund Association Act 1873 (36 & 37 Vict. c. lxxxviii)) and for other purposes.
Haddenham Level Act 1884	47 & 48 Vict. c. vii	28 April 1884
An Act to amend the Acts relating to Haddenham Level and to provide for the racking and maintaining of Roads in the said Level and for other purposes.
Belfast, Strandtown and High Holywood Railway (Extension of Time) Act 1884	47 & 48 Vict. c. viii	28 April 1884
An Act to extend the period limited by the Belfast Strandtown and High Holywood Railway Act, 1881 (Note: Belfast Strandtown and High Holywood Railway Act 1881 (44 & 45 Vict. c. ccxiv)) for the compulsory purchase of lands and for other purposes.
Bradbury and Lomax's Patent Act 1884	47 & 48 Vict. c. ix	28 April 1884
An Act for rendering valid certain Letters Patent granted to George Francis Bradbury and Henry Lomax for Improvements in Sewing Machines.
Clyde Lighthouses Act 1884 (repealed)	47 & 48 Vict. c. x	28 April 1884
An Act to authorise the Trustees of the Clyde Lighthouses to raise an additional sum of money, and for other purposes. (Repealed by Clyde Lighthouses Consolidation Order Confirmation Act 1940 (3 & 4 Geo. 6. c. xlii))
Boult's Patent Act 1884	47 & 48 Vict. c. xi	28 April 1884
An Act for rendering valid certain Letters Patent granted to Alfred Julius Boult of 323 High Holborn in the county of Middlesex for improvements in the method and means of removing Dust from Carpets.
Wood Green Congregational Church Marriage Legalization Act 1884 (repealed)	47 & 48 Vict. c. xii	19 May 1884
An Act for legalizing Marriages heretofore solemnized in the Wood Green Congregational Church, in the district of Edmonton, in the county of Middlesex. (Repealed by Statute Law (Repeals) Act 1977 (c. 18))
Oyster and Mussel Fisheries Order Confirmation Act 1884	47 & 48 Vict. c. xiii	19 May 1884
An Act to confirm an Order made by the Board of Trade under the Sea Fisheries Act, 1868, (Note: Sea Fisheries Act 1868 (31 & 32 Vict. c. 45)) relating to Ramsholt.
	Ramsholt Fishery Order 1884	
Electric Lighting Orders Confirmation Act 1884	47 & 48 Vict. c. xiv	19 May 1884
An Act to confirm a Provisional Order made by the Board of Trade under the Electric Lighting Act, 1882, (Note: Electric Lighting Act 1882 (45 & 46 Vict. c. 56)) transferring certain Rights, Powers, and Obligations under certain Provisional Orders to the Edison and Swan United Electric Light Company (Limited), and for other purposes.
	Edison and Swan United Electric Lighting Order 1884	
London and Saint Katharine Docks Company Act 1884 (repealed)	47 & 48 Vict. c. xv	19 May 1884
An Act to enable the London and Saint Katharine Docks Company to make a new entrance to their Royal Albert Dock; and for other purposes. (Repealed by Port of London (Consolidation) Act 1920 (10 & 11 Geo. 5. c. clxxiii))
Greenock Harbour Act 1884 (repealed)	47 & 48 Vict. c. xvi	19 May 1884
An Act to confer further powers on the Trustees of the Port and Harbours of Greenock in relation to their Harbours and Docks; and for other purposes. (Repealed by Greenock Port and Harbours Consolidation Act 1913 (3 & 4 Geo. 5. c. xlii))
Rickmansworth Waterworks Act 1884	47 & 48 Vict. c. xvii	19 May 1884
An Act for incorporating and conferring powers on the Rickmansworth Waterworks Company.
London Hospital Act 1884 (repealed)	47 & 48 Vict. c. xviii	19 May 1884
An Act for confirming certain Leases granted by the Governors of the London Hospital and for enabling them to grant building and other Leases of their Estates and for enlarging their Powers with respect to the reception of Patients and for other purposes. (Repealed by Statute Law (Repeals) Act 2013 (c. 2))
West Lancashire Railway (Capital) Act 1884	47 & 48 Vict. c. xix	19 May 1884
An Act to authorise the West Lancashire Railway Company to borrow Money for the payment of Debts.
Ayr and District Tramways Act 1884 (repealed)	47 & 48 Vict. c. xx	19 May 1884
An Act to authorise the construction of the Ayr and District Tramways, in the county of Ayr; and for other purposes. (Repealed by Ayr and District Tramways (Abandonment) Act 1888 (51 & 52 Vict. c. xxxvii))
Highgate Archway Act 1884 (repealed)	47 & 48 Vict. c. xxi	19 May 1884
An Act for the winding-up of the affairs and the dissolution of the Highgate Archway Company. (Repealed by Statute Law (Repeals) Act 2013 (c. 2))
Kensington Public Baths Act 1884 (repealed)	47 & 48 Vict. c. xxii	19 May 1884
An Act to enable the Commissioners for Public Baths and Wash-houses in the parish of Saint Mary Abbotts Kensington to acquire otherwise than by agreement certain Lands in the said parish and for other purposes. (Repealed by London Government (Borough of Kensington) Order in Council 1901 (SR&O 1901/271))
Scottish Imperial Insurance Company's Act 1884 (repealed)	47 & 48 Vict. c. xxiii	19 May 1884
An Act to alter the Memorandum of Association of the Scottish Imperial Insurance Company; and for other purposes. (Repealed by Statute Law (Repeals) Act 1998 (c. 43))
Scottish Provident Institution Act 1884 (repealed)	47 & 48 Vict. c. xxiv	19 May 1884
An Act to amend the Act (Note: Scottish Provident Institution Act 1848 (11 & 12 Vict. c. cvi)) incorporating the Scottish Provident Institution, and the Deed of Constitution and Laws and Regulations of the Institution; to confer further powers on the Institution; and for other purposes. (Repealed by Scottish Provident Institution Act 1927 (17 & 18 Geo. 5. c. xv))
Glasgow Corporation Act 1884 (repealed)	47 & 48 Vict. c. xxv	19 May 1884
An Act to confer further powers on the Corporation of Glasgow in relation to their Markets and Slaughter-houses Undertaking; and to enable the Corporation to construct additional Tramways; to borrow further money; and for other purposes. (Repealed by Glasgow Corporation Consolidation (Water, Transport and Markets) Order Confirmation Act 1964 (c. xliii))
Great Northern Railway Act 1884	47 & 48 Vict. c. xxvi	19 May 1884
An Act to confer further powers upon the Great Northern Railway Company with respect to their own and other undertakings and for other purposes.
Longton Extension Act 1884	47 & 48 Vict. c. xxvii	19 May 1884
An Act to extend the borough of Longton and for other purposes.
Bolton-le-Sands and Warton Reclamation (Extension of Time) Act 1884	47 & 48 Vict. c. xxviii	19 May 1884
An Act to extend the time for completing an embankment and other works in connexion with the Reclamation of certain Lands in Morecambe Bay in the county of Lancaster and for other purposes.
Mersey Docks Act 1884 (repealed)	47 & 48 Vict. c. xxix	19 May 1884
An Act to sanction the purchase by the Mersey Docks and Harbour Board of certain Lands and to confirm an Agreement between the Board and the Earl of Sefton and to amend in certain respects the Acts relating to the Board. (Repealed by Mersey Docks and Harbour Board Act 1971 (c. x))
Dublin (South) City Market (Amendment) Act 1884	47 & 48 Vict. c. xxx	19 May 1884
An Act to amend the Dublin (South) City Market Acts 1876 to 1883 and for other purposes.
Upwell, Outwell and Wisbech Railway (Abandonment) Act 1884 (repealed)	47 & 48 Vict. c. xxxi	19 May 1884
An Act for the abandonment of the Upwell Outwell and Wisbech Railway. (Repealed by Statute Law (Repeals) Act 2013 (c. 2))
Leicester Corporation Act 1884 (repealed)	47 & 48 Vict. c. xxxii	19 May 1884
An Act to enable the Corporation of Leicester to consolidate their Loans and convert the same into Stock and to make further provision for the improvement and good government of the borough; and for other purposes. (Repealed by Leicestershire Act 1985 (c. xvii))
North Sea Fisheries (East Lincolnshire) Harbour and Dock Act 1884	47 & 48 Vict. c. xxxiii	19 May 1884
An Act to authorise the construction of a tidal harbour dock and other works at Sutton-le-Marsh in the county of Lincoln; and for other purposes,
Severn Bridge and Forest of Dean Central Railway (Abandonment) Act 1884 (repealed)	47 & 48 Vict. c. xxxiv	19 May 1884
An Act for the abandonment of the Railways authorised by the Severn Bridge and Forest of Dean Central Railway Act 1873 (Note: Severn Bridge and Forest of Dean Central Railway Act 1873 (36 & 37 Vict. c. cxcii)) and the Severn Bridge and Forest of Dean Central Railway Act 1876 (Note: Severn Bridge and Forest of Dean Central Railway Act 1876 (39 & 40 Vict. c. ccxix)) and for other purposes. (Repealed by Statute Law (Repeals) Act 2013 (c. 2))
Ayr Bridge Act 1884	47 & 48 Vict. c. xxxv	19 May 1884
An Act to make further provision with respect to the payment of the cost of the Bridge across the River of Ayr within the Burgh of Ayr; and for other purposes.
Ayr Harbour Amendment Act 1884	47 & 48 Vict. c. xxxvi	19 May 1884
An Act for authorising the Ayr Harbour Trustees to borrow additional money; and for other purposes.
Belfast Central Railway Act 1884	47 & 48 Vict. c. xxxvii	19 May 1884
An Act to authorise the Belfast Central Railway Company to deviate part and to abandon other parts of their authorised Western Extensions and to extend the periods limited for the purchase of lands for and for the completion of the remainder of those Extensions and for other purposes.
Trent Navigation Act 1884	47 & 48 Vict. c. xxxviii	19 May 1884
An Act to provide for the effectual maintenance of the Navigation of the River Trent from Wilden Ferry in the counties of Derby and Leicester or one of them to Gainsborough in the county of Lincoln.
Gas Orders Confirmation (No. 1) Act 1884	47 & 48 Vict. c. xxxix	23 June 1884
An Act for confirming certain Provisional Orders made by the Board of Trade under the Gas and Water Works Facilities Act, 1870, (Note: Gas and Water Works Facilities Act 1870 (33 & 34 Vict. c. 70)) relating to Colwyn Bay and District Gas, Crays Gas, Fleetwood Gas, Frome Gas, and Hull Gas.
	Colwyn Bay and District Gas Order 1884	
	Crays Gas Order 1884	
	Frome Gas Order 1884	
	Fleetwood Gas Order 1884	
	British Gas Light Company (Hull Station) Order 1884	
Water Orders Confirmation (No. 1) Act 1884	47 & 48 Vict. c. xl	23 June 1884
An Act for confirming certain Provisional Orders made by the Board of Trade under the Gas and Water Works Facilities Act, 1870, relating to Dyke District Water, Hoddesdon Water, and Thirsk District Water.
	Dyke District Water Order 1884	
	Thirsk District Water Order 1884	
Land Drainage Supplemental Act 1884	47 & 48 Vict. c. xli	23 June 1884
An Act to confirm certain Provisional Orders under the Land Drainage Act, 1861. (Note: Land Drainage Act 1861 (24 & 25 Vict. c. 133))
Electric Lighting Order Confirmation (No. 2) Act 1884	47 & 48 Vict. c. xlii	23 June 1884
An Act to confirm a Provisional Order made by the Board of Trade under the Electric Lighting Act, 1882, relating to Bury St. Edmund's.
	Bury St. Edmund's Electric Lighting Order 1884	
Local Government Board's Provisional Orders Confirmation (Poor Law) Act 1884	47 & 48 Vict. c. xliii	23 June 1884
An Act to confirm certain Orders of the Local Government Board under the provisions of the Divided Parishes and Poor Law Amendment Act, 1876, (Note: Divided Parishes and Poor Law Amendment Act 1876 (39 & 40 Vict. c. 61)) as amended and extended by the Poor Law Act, 1879, (Note: Poor Law Act 1879 (42 & 43 Vict. c. 54)) relating to the Parishes of Alton-Barnes, Barnstaple, Bishops Tawton, Buckland-Brewer, Bulkworthy, Drewsteignton, East Knoyle, Frithelstock (two), Hittesleigh, Homingsham, Maiden-Bradley-with-Yarnfield, Newton-Saint-Petrock, Parkham, Pertwood, and Sutton-Veney; and to the Chapelry of Alton Priors.
	Barnstaple and Bishops Tawton Order 1884	
	Buckland Brewer and Parkham Order 1884	
	Bulkworthy and Frithelstock Order 1884	
	Frithelstock and Newton St. Petrock Order 1884	
	Drewsteignton and Hittesleigh Order 1884	
	Alton Barnes and Chapelry of Alton Priors Order 1884	
	Maiden Bradley with Yarnfield and Horningsham Order 1884	
	Pertwood, East Knoyle, and Sutton Veney Order 1884	
Local Government Board's Provisional Orders Confirmation (Poor Law) (No. 2) Act 1884	47 & 48 Vict. c. xliv	23 June 1884
An Act to confirm certain Orders of the Local Government Board under the provisions of the Divided Parishes and Poor Law Amendment Act, 1876, as amended and extended by the Poor Law Act, 1879, and the Divided Parishes and Poor Law Amendment Act, 1882, (Note: Divided Parishes and Poor Law Amendment Act 1882 (45 & 46 Vict. c. 58)) relating to the Parishes of Bovey-Tracey, Broadwood Kelly, Calverleigh, Colyton, Combe-in-Teignhead, Denbury, East Ogwell, Haccombe, Hennock, High Week, Ipplepen, Loxbear, Lustleigh, Monk Okehampton, Moreton-Hampstead, North Bovey, Southleigh, Stoke-in-Teignhead, Torbryan (two), and Woolborough.
	Colyton and Southleigh Order 1884	
	Bovey Tracey, East Ogwell, Hennock, High Week, Ipplepen, Lustleigh, Moreton Hampstead, North Bovey, Torbryan, and Woolborough Order 1884	
	Denbury and Torbryan Order 1884	
	Combe in Teignhead, Haccombe, and Stoke in Teignhead Order 1884	
	Broadwood Kelly and Monk Okehampton Order 1884	
	Calverleigh and Loxbear Order 1884	
Local Government Board's Provisional Orders Confirmation (Poor Law) (No. 3) Act 1884	47 & 48 Vict. c. xlv	23 June 1884
An Act to confirm certain Orders of the Local Government Board under the provisions of the Divided Parishes and Poor Law Amendment Act, 1876, as amended and extended by the Poor Law Act, 1879, relating to the Parishes of Ashill, Beckington, Berkeley, Broadway, Brockley, Chelvey, Crewkerne, Cricket Malherby, Dinnington, Dowlish-Wake, Elm, Frome, Hawkridge, Ilton, Kilmersdon, Kingston, Knowle-Saint-Giles, Laverton, Marston-Biggott, Mells, Road, Seavington-Saint-Mary, Standerwick, Tellesford, Wayford, West Dowlish, Whatley, Whitelackington, Withypoole, and Woolverton.
	Brockley and Chelvey Order 1884	
	Ashill, Broadway, Crewkerne, Cricket Malherby, Dinnington, Dowlish Wake, Ilton, Kingston, Knowle St. Giles, Seavington St. Mary, Wayford, West Dowlish, and Whitelackington Order 1884	
	Hawkridge and Withypool Order 1884	
	Beckington, Berkeley, Elm, Frome, Kilmersdon, Laverton, Marston Biggott, Mells, Road, Standerwick, Tellesford, Whatley, and Woolverton Order 1884	
Local Government Board's Provisional Orders Confirmation (Poor Law) (No. 5) Act 1884	47 & 48 Vict. c. xlvi	23 June 1884
An Act to confirm certain Orders of the Local Government Board under the provisions of the Divided Parishes and Poor Law Amendment Act, 1876, as amended and extended by the Poor Law Act, 1879, and the Divided Parishes and Poor Law Amendment Act, 1882, relating to the Parishes of Acton, Alphamstone, Assington, Belchamp-Otten, Belchamp-Walter, Boxted, Bulmer, Bures-Saint-Mary, Castlecamps, Cavendish, Chilton, Foxearth, Glemsford, Great Cornard, Great Henny, Great Waldingfield, Helion's-Bumpstead, Lamarsh, Linstead Parva, Liston, Little Cornard, Little Waldingfield, Long Melford, Mendham (two), Metfield, Middleton, Newton (near Sudbury), Redenhall with Harleston, Somerton, Stoke (near Nayland), Twinstead, and Withersdale, and to the Hamlet of Buers.
	Linstead Parva, Mendham, Metfield, and Withersdale Order 1884	
	Mendham and Redenhall with Harleston Order 1884	
	Castlecamps and Helion's Bumpstead Order 1884	
	Acton, Alphamstone, Assington, Belchamp Otten, Belchamp Walter, Boxted, Bulmer, Bures St. Mary, Cavendish, Chilton, Foxearth, Glemsford, Great Cornard, Great Henny, Great Waldingfield, Lamarsh, Liston, Little Waldingfield, Long Melford, Middleton, Newton (near Sudbury), Somerton, Stoke (near Nayland), and Twinstead, and the Hamlet of Buers Order 1884	
Local Government Board's Provisional Orders Confirmation (Poor Law) (No. 6) Act 1884	47 & 48 Vict. c. xlvii	23 June 1884
An Act to confirm certain Orders of the Local Government Board under the provisions of the Divided Parishes and Poor Law Amendment Act, 1876, as amended and extended by the Poor Law Act, 1879, relating to the Parishes of Ashen, Bildeston, Boxford, Brockley, Brettenham, Carlton, Colne-Engain, Great Maplestead, Great Yeldam, Groton, Hitcham, Kelsale, Kettlebaston, Lindsey, Little Maplestead, Little Yeldam, Naughton, Nedging, Polstead, Preston, Ridgewell, Semer, Sible-Hedingham, Stambourne, Tilbury juxta Clare, Toppesfield, Wattesham, Whatfield, Whepstead, and White Colne.
	Carlton and Kelsale Order 1884	
	Bildeston, Boxford, Brettenham, Groton, Hitcham, Kettlebaston, Lindsey, Naughton, Nedging, Polstead, Preston, Semer, Wattesham, and Whatfield Order 1884	
	Ashen, Colne Engain, Great Maplestead, Great Yeldam, Little Maplestead, Little Yeldam, Ridgewell, Sible Hedingham, Stambourne, Tilbury juxta Clare, Toppesfield, and White Colne Order 1884	
	Brockley and Whepstead Order 1884	
Local Government Board's Provisional Orders Confirmation (Poor Law) (No. 7) Act 1884 (repealed)	47 & 48 Vict. c. xlviii	23 June 1884
An Act to confirm certain Orders of the Local Government Board under the provisions of the Divided Parishes and Poor Law Amendment Act, 1876, as amended and extended by the Poor Law Act, 1879, and the Divided Parishes and Poor Law Amendment Act, 1882, relating to the Parishes of Abberley, Ashperton (two), Donnington, Holy Cross in Pershore, In-Liberties, Ledbury, Llangaran, Munsley (two), Norton juxta Kempsey, Putley (two), Rock, Saint Andrew, Saint Andrew in Pershore, Saint Martin, Saint Nicholas, Saint Peter, Stoke Edith, Stretton-Grandsome or Grandison, Stoulton, Upper Bullingham, Weston-Beggard, Whitchurch, Woolhope, and Yarkhill, to the Chapelries of Westhide and Whittington, and to the Township of Grafton. (Repealed by Statute Law (Repeals) Act 1998 (c. 43))
Local Government Board's Provisional Orders Confirmation (Poor Law) (No. 8) Act 1884	47 & 48 Vict. c. xlix	23 June 1884
An Act to confirm certain Orders of the Local Government Board under the provisions of the Divided Parishes and Poor Law Amendment Act, 1876, as amended and extended by the Poor Law Act, 1879, and the Divided Parishes and Poor Law Amendment Act, 1882, relating to the Parishes of Abergwilly, Bettws Bledrws, Carmarthen, Cole Orton, Kings Sutton, Llandewi Aberarth, Llangybi, Llanpumpsaint, Llansaintfraed and Llannon, Llanvihangel Abercowin, Mydrim, Newbottle, Newchurch, and Thringston, and to the Townships of Thelwall and Woolstone with Martinscroft.
	Llandewi Aberarth and Llansaintfraed and Llannon Order 1884	
	Cole Orton and Thringston Order 1884	
	Kings Sutton and Newbottle Order 1884	
	Abergwilly, Carmarthen, Llanpumpsaint, Llanvihangel, Abercowin, Mydrim, and Newchurch Order 1884	
	Bettws Bledrws and Llangybi Order 1884	
	Thelwall and Woolstone with Martinscroft Order 1884	
Commons Regulation (Redhill and Earlswood Commons) Provisional Order Confirmation Act 1884 (repealed)	47 & 48 Vict. c. l	23 June 1884
An Act to confirm the Provisional Order for the Regulation of Redhill and Earlswood Commons, situate in the parishes of Reigate and Horley, in the county of Surrey, in pursuance of a Report of the Land Commissioners for England. (Repealed by Surrey Act 1985 (c. iii))
Gas Orders Confirmation (No. 2) Act 1884	47 & 48 Vict. c. li	23 June 1884
An Act to confirm certain Provisional Orders made by the Board of Trade under the Gas and Water Works Facilities Act, 1870, relating to Emsworth Gas, Hornsey Gas, Kirkburton Gas, Quorndon and Mountsorrel Gas, and Slough Gas.
	Emsworth Gas Order 1884	
	Hornsey Gas Order 1884	
	Kirkburton Gas Order 1884	
	Quorndon and Mountsorrel Gas Order 1884	
	Slough Gas Order 1884	
West Cheshire Water Act 1884 (repealed)	47 & 48 Vict. c. lii	23 June 1884
An Act for incorporating the West Cheshire Water Company and conferring powers on them with reference to the Construction of Works and the Supply of Water and otherwise and for other purposes. (Repealed by Cheshire County Council Act 1980 (c. xiii))
Plympton and District Waterworks Act 1884	47 & 48 Vict. c. liii	23 June 1884
An Act to dissolve and re-incorporate the Plympton and District Waterworks Company (Limited) and for other purposes.
Walker and Wallsend Union Gas Act 1884	47 & 48 Vict. c. liv	23 June 1884
An Act for the granting of further Powers to the Walker and Wallsend Union Gas Company.
Totnes, Paignton and Torquay Direct Railway (Abandonment) Act 1884 (repealed)	47 & 48 Vict. c. lv	23 June 1884
An Act for the abandonment of the Totnes Paignton and Torquay Direct Railway. (Repealed by Statute Law (Repeals) Act 2013 (c. 2))
Birkenhead Improvement Act 1884 (repealed)	47 & 48 Vict. c. lvi	23 June 1884
An Act for authorising the Corporation of the Borough of Birkenhead to execute certain Street Improvements; for better regulating the erection of new buildings in the Borough; for amending certain local Acts, and making further police and sanitary regulations, and for other purposes. (Repealed by County of Merseyside Act 1980 (c. x))
London Tramways Company Act 1884	47 & 48 Vict. c. lvii	23 June 1884
An Act to amend the London Tramways Company (Limited) Capital Act 1880 (Note: London Tramways Company Capital Act 1880 (43 & 44 Vict. c. clv)) and for other purposes.
North Western Railway Act 1884	47 & 48 Vict. c. lviii	23 June 1884
An Act for enabling the North-eastern Railway Company to make a new Railway and to acquire additional Lands and for other purposes.
Southampton Corporation (Cemetery, &c.) Act 1884	47 & 48 Vict. c. lix	23 June 1884
An Act to enable the Corporation of Southampton to enlarge their Cemetery; and for other purposes.
Kingston-upon-Hull Corporation and Water Act 1884 (repealed)	47 & 48 Vict. c. lx	23 June 1884
An Act for empowering the mayor aldermen and burgesses of the borough of Kingston-upon-Hull to make better provision for the supply of Water to their borough and other parts of their district of supply and to supply Water to the Cottingham Local Board; and for other purposes. (Repealed by Kingston-upon-Hull Corporation Act 1930 (20 & 21 Geo. 5. c. clxxv))
West Ham Local Board Extension of Powers Act 1884	47 & 48 Vict. c. lxi	23 June 1884
An Act for enabling the Local Board for the district of West Ham, in the county of Essex, to free the North Woolwich or Victoria Dock Road and Liliput Road from toll, and to purchase lands, and to construct certain works, and for granting additional powers to the said Local Board and for other purposes.
King's Lynn Dock Act 1884	47 & 48 Vict. c. lxii	23 June 1884
An Act to confer further powers upon the King's Lynn Dock Company; and for other purposes.
Nar Valley Drainage Act 1884	47 & 48 Vict. c. lxiii	23 June 1884
An Act to amend the Nar Valley Drainage Act 1881 (Note: Nar Valley Drainage Act 1881 (44 & 45 Vict. c. clxxix)) and to empower the Nar Valley Drainage Board to raise further money by borrowing.
Swindon, Marlborough and Andover, and Swindon and Cheltenham Extension Railways (Amalgamation) Act 1884	47 & 48 Vict. c. lxiv	23 June 1884
An Act to amalgamate the Undertakings of the Swindon Marlborough and Andover and the Swindon and Cheltenham Extension Railway Companies; and for other purposes.
Star Life Assurance Society Act 1884 (repealed)	47 & 48 Vict. c. lxv	23 June 1884
An Act to remove doubts respecting certain provisions in the Deed of Settlement of the Star Life Assurance Society, and respecting the participation in profits by holders of certain policies of the Society; and for other purposes. (Repealed by Star Assurance Society's Act 1911 (1 & 2 Geo. 5. c. lxix))
Imperial Continental Gas Association Act 1884 (repealed)	47 & 48 Vict. c. lxvi	23 June 1884
An Act for empowering the Imperial Continental Gas Association to raise further Capital and for other purposes. (Repealed by Imperial Continental Gas Association Act 1929 (19 & 20 Geo. 5. c. lxxxix))
Henley-in-Arden and Great Western Junction Railway (Revival of Powers) Act 1884	47 & 48 Vict. c. lxvii	23 June 1884
An Act to revive the powers and extend the periods for the compulsory purchase of Lands and for the construction of the Railway authorised by the Henley-in-Arden and Great Western Junction Railway Act 1873 (Note: Henley-in-Arden and Great Western Junction Railway Act 1873 (36 & 37 Vict. c. ccxxxviii)) and for other purposes.
Swindon and Cheltenham Extension Railway Act 1884	47 & 48 Vict. c. lxviii	23 June 1884
An Act to confer further Powers on the Swindon and Cheltenham Extension Railway Company; and for other purposes.
Windsor Corporation Water Act 1884	47 & 48 Vict. c. lxix	23 June 1884
An Act for carrying into effect the purchase of the Windsor and Eton Waterworks by the Mayor Aldermen and Burgesses of the borough of New Windsor and for other purposes.
Ruthin and Cerrig-y-druidion Railway (Abandonment) Act 1884 (repealed)	47 & 48 Vict. c. lxx	23 June 1884
An Act for the abandonment of the Ruthin and Cerrig-y-druidion Railway and for other purposes. (Repealed by Statute Law (Repeals) Act 2013 (c. 2))
Hull, Barnsley and West Riding Junction Railway and Dock Act 1884	47 & 48 Vict. c. lxxi	23 June 1884
An Act to authorise the Hull Barnsley and West Riding Junction Railway and Dock Company to construct new Railways and other Works to amend the Acts relating to the Company and for other purposes.
London Hydraulic Power Act 1884	47 & 48 Vict. c. lxxii	23 June 1884
An Act to extend the District to enlarge the Powers and to change the name of the Wharves and Warehouses Steam Power and Hydraulic Pressure Company; and for other purposes.
Local Government Board's Provisional Orders Confirmation (Poor Law) (No. 4) Act 1884	47 & 48 Vict. c. lxxiii	3 July 1884
An Act to confirm certain Orders of the Local Government Board under the provisions of the Divided Parishes and Poor Law Amendment Act, 1876, as amended and extended by the Poor Law Act, 1879, relating to the Parishes of Belchalwell, Blackford, Bruton, Butleigh, Charlton Horethome, Charlton Musgrove, Fifehead Neville, Henstridge, Holton, Horsington, Marston Magna, Milbome Port, North Brewham, North Cadbury, North Cheriton, Okeford Fitzpaine, Penselwood, Pitcombe, Queen Camel, Shepton-Montague, South Brewham, Stoke-Trister, Stowell, Walton, and Wincanton.
	Blackford, Bruton, Charlton Horethorne, Charlton Musgrove, Henstridge, Holton, Horsington, Marston Magna, Milborne Port, North Brewham, North Cadbury, North Cheriton, Penselwood, Pitcombe, Queen Camel, Shepton Montague, South Brewham, Stoke Trister, Stowell, and Wincanton Order 1884	
	Belchalwell, Fifehead, Neville, and Okeford Fitzpaine Order 1884	
	Butleigh and Walton Order 1884	
Local Government Board's Provisional Orders Confirmation (Poor Law) (No. 9) Act 1884	47 & 48 Vict. c. lxxiv	3 July 1884
An Act to confirm certain Orders of the Local Government Board under the provisions of the Divided Parishes and Poor Law Amendment Act, 1876, as amended and extended by the Poor Law Act, 1879, relating to the Parishes of Ashen, Birdbrook, Broekdish, Haverhill, Hundon, Little Wratting, Ovington, Peasenhall, Sibton, Steeple Bumpstead, Stoke-by-Clare, Stratton-Long-Saint-Mary, Stunner, Thorpe Abbotts, Tilbury-juxta-Clare, Wacton Magna, Whixhoe, and Withersfield; and to the Townships of Emswell-with-Kelleythorpe, Eskdaleside, Great Driffield, Little Driffield, and Ugglebarnby.
	Peasenhall and Sibton Order 1884	
	Brockdish, Stratton Long St. Mary, Thorpe Abbott's, and Wacton Magna Order 1884	
	Emswell with Kelleythorpe, Great Driffield, and Little Drifield Order 1884	
	Ashen, Birdbrook, Haverhill, Hundon, Little Wratting, Ovington, Steeple Bumpstead, Stoke by Clare, Sturmer, Tilbury juxta Clare, Whixhoe, and Withersfield Order 1884	
	Eskdaleside and Ugglebarnby Order 1884	
Local Government Board's Provisional Orders Confirmation (Poor Law) (No. 10) Act 1884	47 & 48 Vict. c. lxxv	3 July 1884
An Act to confirm certain Orders of the Local Government Board under the provisions of the Divided Parishes and Poor Law Amendment Act, 1876, as amended and extended by the Poor Law Act, 1879, and the Divided Parishes and Poor Law Amendment Act, 1882, relating to the Parishes of Charley (two), Eddlesborough, Helmdon, Ivinghoe, Little Gaddesden, Markfield, Marston Saint Lawrence (two), Middleton Cheney, Newtown Linford, Slapton, Syresham, Thenford, and Whitfield; to the Townships of Marnham and South Clifton; and to the Hamlet of Astwell-with-Falcutt.
	Marston St. Lawrence and Middleton Cheney Order 1884	
	Charley and Newtown Linford Order 1884	
	Eddlesborough, Ivinghoe, Little Gaddesden, and Slapton Order 1884	
	Astwell with Falcutt, Helmdon, Marston, St. Lawrence, Syresham, Thenford, and Whitfield Order 1884	
	Marnham and South Clifton Order 1884	
	Charley and Markfield Order 1884	
Electric Lighting Order Confirmation (No. 3) Act 1884	47 & 48 Vict. c. lxxvi	3 July 1884
An Act to confirm a Provisional Order made by the Board of Trade under the Electric Lighting Act, 1882, relating to Saint James, Westminster, Saint Martin-in-the-Fields, and Saint George, Hanover Square.
	St. James, St. Martin and St. George Hanover Square (West London) Electric Lighting Order 1884	
Local Government Board (Ireland) Provisional Orders Confirmation (North Dublin, &c.) Act 1884	47 & 48 Vict. c. lxxvii	3 July 1884
An Act to confirm certain Provisional Orders of the Local Government Board for Ireland under the Labourers (Ireland) Act, 1883, (Note: Labourers (Ireland) Act 1883 (46 & 47 Vict. c. 60)) relating to the Unions of North Dublin, Kells, Kilmallock, Mitchelstown, Rathdrum, Tralee, Trim, and Tulla.
	North Dublin Union Labourers Order 1884 Provisional Order in pursuance of the Labourers (Ireland) Act, 1883, authorising the purchase and taking of Land otherwise than by agreement.	
	Kells Union Labourers Order 1884 Provisional Order in pursuance of the Labourers (Ireland) Act, 1883, authorising the purchase and taking of Land otherwise than by agreement.	
	Kilmallock Union Labourers Order 1884 No. 1 Provisional Order in pursuance of the Labourers (Ireland) Act, 1883, authorising the purchase and taking of Land otherwise than by agreement.	
	Kilmallock Union Labourers Order 1884 No. 2 Provisional Order in pursuance of the Labourers (Ireland) Act, 1883, authorising the purchase and taking of Land otherwise than by agreement.	
	Mitchelstown Union Labourers Order 1884 Provisional Order in pursuance of the Labourers (Ireland) Act, 1883, authorising the purchase and taking of Land otherwise than by agreement.	
	Rathdrum Union Labourers Order 1884 Provisional Order in pursuance of the Labourers (Ireland) Act, 1883, authorising the purchase and taking of Land otherwise than by agreement.	
	Tralee Union Labourers Order 1884 Provisional Order in pursuance of the Labourers (Ireland) Act, 1883, authorising the purchase and taking of Land otherwise than by agreement.	
	Trim Union Labourers Order 1884 Provisional Order in pursuance of the Labourers (Ireland) Act, 1883, authorising the purchase and taking of Land otherwise than by agreement.	
	Tulla Union Labourers Order 1884 Provisional Order in pursuance of the Labourers (Ireland) Act, 1883, authorising the purchase and taking of Land otherwise than by agreement.	
Local Government Board (Ireland) Provisional Orders Confirmation (Bandon Waterworks) Act 1884	47 & 48 Vict. c. lxxviii	3 July 1884
An Act to confirm a Provisional Order of the Local Government Board for Ireland relating to Waterworks in the town of Bandon.
	Bandon Waterworks Provisional Order 1884 Bandon Waterworks. Provisional Order.	
Water Orders Confirmation (No. 2) Act 1884	47 & 48 Vict. c. lxxix	3 July 1884
An Act to confirm certain Provisional Orders made by the Board of Trade under the Gas and Water Works Facilities Act, 1870, relating to Alperton and Sudbury Water, Market Weighton Water, Newmarket Water, and Wisbech Water.
	Alperton and Sudbury Water Order 1884 Order authorising the maintenance and continuance of Waterworks, the construction of additional Waterworks, and the supply of water in and to portions of the Hamlets of Alperton, Sudbury, and Wembley, in the Parish of Harrow, and in and to the Parishes of Twyford, Perivale, Greenford, and Northolt, all in the County of Middlesex.	
	Market Weighton Water Order 1884 Order empowering the Market Weighton Water Company (Limited) to construct and maintain Waterworks and to supply Water in the Parish of Market Weighton, in the East Riding of the county of York.	
	Newmarket Water Order 1884 Order for conferring further Powers upon the Newmarket Waterworks Company (Limited).	
	Wisbech Water Order 1884 Order empowering the Wisbech Waterworks Company to extend their Limits of Supply and to raise additional Capital.	
Tramways Orders Confirmation (No. 2) Act 1884	47 & 48 Vict. c. lxxx	3 July 1884
An Act to confirm certain Provisional Orders made by the Board of Trade under "The Tramways Act, 1870," (Note: Tramways Act 1870 (33 & 34 Vict. c. 78)) relating to Leicester Tramways (Extensions), Walsall and District Tramways, and Wigan Tramways.
	Leicester Tramways (Extensions) Order 1884 Order authorising the Construction of Tramways in the parishes of Saint Margaret Leicester, Aylestone, Humberstone, Belgrave, Knighton and Oadby, in the county of Leicester.	
	Walsall and District Tramways Order 1884 Order amending the Walsall and District Tramways Order, 1880, and the Walsall and District Tramways Order, 1882.	
	Wigan Tramways Order 1884 Order authorising the Construction of certain additional Tramways in the borough of Wigan and neighbourhood in the county of Lancaster.	
Local Government Board's Provisional Order Confirmation (Highways) Act 1884	47 & 48 Vict. c. lxxxi	3 July 1884
An Act to confirm a Provisional Order of the Local Government Board under the Highways and Locomotives (Amendment) Act, 1878, (Note: Highways and Locomotives (Amendment) Act 1878 (41 & 42 Vict. c. 77)) relating to the County of Montgomery.
	Montgomery Order 1884 Provisional Order as to certain Disturnpiked Roads.	
Local Government Board's Provisional Orders Confirmation (Poor Law) (No. 12) Act 1884	47 & 48 Vict. c. lxxxii	3 July 1884
An Act to confirm certain Orders of the Local Government Board under the provisions of the Divided Parishes and Poor Law Amendment Act, 1876, as amended and extended by the Poor Law Act, 1879, and the Divided Parishes and Poor Law Amendment Act, 1882, relating to the Parishes of Barnwood, Brockthrop (two), Churchdown, Down Hatherly, Harescomb (two), Haresfield (two), Hempstead, Maismore, Matson, North Hamlet, Quedgley (two), Saint Catherine's with Kingsholm Saint Catherine's, Saint John Baptist, Saint Mary-de-Lode with Kingsholm Saint Mary, Saint Nicholas, Sandhurst, South Hamlet, Upton Saint Leonard's, Ville of Wotton, and Whaddon (two), to the Township of Over Higham and Linton, and to the Hamlets of Barton Saint Mary, Barton Saint Michael, Longford Saint Catherine's, Longford Saint Mary, Tuffiey, Twigworth, and Wootton Saint Mary.
	Barnwood, &c. Order 1884 Gloucester and Wheatenhurst Unions.	
	Brockthrop, Harescombe, Haresfield, Quedgley, and Whaddon Order 1884 Gloucester and Wheatenhurst Unions.	
Local Government Board's Provisional Orders Confirmation (Poor Law) (No. 13) Act 1884	47 & 48 Vict. c. lxxxiii	3 July 1884
An Act to confirm certain Provisional Orders of the Local Government Board under the provisions of the Poor Law Amendment Act, 1867, (Note: Poor Law Amendment Act 1867 (30 & 31 Vict. c. 106)) as amended by the Poor Law Amendment Act, 1868, (Note: Poor Law Amendment Act 1868 (31 & 32 Vict. c. 122)) and extended by the Poor Law Act, 1879, relating to the city of Oxford and the Parish of Saint Mary. Whitechapel.
	Oxford Order 1884 Provisional Order for altering and amending a Local Act. (Note: Oxford Poor Act 1854 (17 & 18 Vict. c. ccxix))	
	Whitechapel Order 1884 Provisional Order for altering the Whitechapel Improvement Act, 1853. (Note: Whitechapel Improvement Act 1853 (16 & 17 Vict. c. cxli))	
Electric Lighting Order Confirmation (No. 4) Act 1884	47 & 48 Vict. c. lxxxiv	3 July 1884
An Act to confirm a Provisional Order made by the Board of Trade under the Electric Lighting Act, 1882, relating to the Fulham District.
	Fulham District Electric Lighting Order 1884 Provisional Order authorising the West Middlesex Electric Lighting Company, Limited, to erect and maintain Electric Lines and Works, and to supply Electricity, within the district of the Fulham District Board of Works, in the County of Middlesex.	
Local Government Board (Ireland) Provisional Orders Confirmation (Dublin City, &c.) Act 1884	47 & 48 Vict. c. lxxxv	3 July 1884
An Act to confirm certain Provisional Orders of the Local Government Board for Ireland relating to new Streets in the City of Dublin, and to the Town of Dungarvan, and to Waterworks in Buncrana.
	Dublin (New Street) Provisional Order 1884 City of Dublin. Provisional Order.	
	Dungarvan Town Provisional Order 1884 Dungarvan Town. Provisional Order.	
	Buncrana Waterworks Provisional Order 1884 Buncrana Waterworks. Provisional Order.	
Sandbach Gas Act 1884	47 & 48 Vict. c. lxxxvi	3 July 1884
An Act for incorporating and conferring powers on the Sandbach Gas Company.
Hamilton Court House and Lanarkshire County Buildings Act 1884	47 & 48 Vict. c. lxxxvii	3 July 1884
An Act for enlarging and improving the Court House and for erecting public buildings at Hamilton and for other purposes.
Cromwell Road Bridge Act 1884	47 & 48 Vict. c. lxxxviii	3 July 1884
An Act to authorise the construction of a bridge over certain railways near the western end of Cromwell Road Kensington with roads and approaches in connection therewith.
Buenos Ayres and Ensenada Port Railway Company's Act 1884 or the Buenos Aires and Ensenada Port Railway Act 1884	47 & 48 Vict. c. lxxxix	3 July 1884
An Act to make provision with reference to the Arrears of Dividend on the Preference Shares in the Capital of the Buenos Ayres and Ensenada Port Railway Company Limited; and for other purposes.
Stalybridge Gas Act 1884	47 & 48 Vict. c. xc	3 July 1884
An Act to enable the Stalybridge Gas Company to purchase additional Land and to raise further Capital and for other purposes.
Clyde Navigation Act 1884	47 & 48 Vict. c. xci	3 July 1884
An Act to authorise the Trustees of the Clyde Navigation to construct Quays or Wharfs and other Works, and to acquire Lands in connexion with their undertaking, and to borrow Money; and for other purposes.
Limerick and Kerry Railway Act 1884	47 & 48 Vict. c. xcii	3 July 1884
An Act to make further Provisions respecting the Capital of the Limerick and Kerry Railway Company and for other purposes.
Belfast Improvement Act 1884	47 & 48 Vict. c. xciii	3 July 1884
An Act to authorise the Construction of New Streets and other Works in the Borough of Belfast and to make further Provision for the Improvement and Government of the Borough and for other purposes.
London Street Tramways (Extensions) Act 1884	47 & 48 Vict. c. xciv	3 July 1884
An Act to authorise the London Street Tramways Company to construct additional Tramways and for other purposes.
Metropolitan Board of Works (District Railway Ventilators) Act 1884	47 & 48 Vict. c. xcv	3 July 1884
An Act to further amend the Metropolitan District Railway Act, 1881; and for other purposes in relation thereto.
Eastern and Midlands Railway Act 1884	47 & 48 Vict. c. xcvi	3 July 1884
An Act to confer further Powers on the Eastern and Midlands Railway Company.
London, Brighton and South Coast Railway (Various Powers) Act 1884	47 & 48 Vict. c. xcvii	3 July 1884
An Act to confer further Powers on the London Brighton and South Coast Railway Company; to transfer to them the powers of the Oxted and Groombridge Railway Company; and for other purposes.
Midland Railway (Additional Powers) Act 1884	47 & 48 Vict. c. xcviii	3 July 1884
An Act to confer additional Powers upon the Midland Railway Company for the construction of Railways and other Works and the Acquisition of Lands and for raising further Capital; and upon that Company and the Great Western Railway Company jointly in respect of a portion of the Railway of the Bristol Port Railway and Pier Company; and for other purposes.
Scarborough and Whitby Railway Act 1884	47 & 48 Vict. c. xcix	3 July 1884
An Act for empowering the Scarborough and Whitby Railway Company to raise additional capital and for other purposes.
West Metropolitan Tramways Act 1884	47 & 48 Vict. c. c	3 July 1884
An Act to authorise the West Metropolitan Tramways Company to raise additional capital and for other purposes.
India Rubber, Gutta Percha and Telegraph Works Company Act 1884	47 & 48 Vict. c. ci	3 July 1884
An Act for defining or extending the powers of the India Rubber, Gutta Percha, and Telegraph Works Company, Limited, and for other purposes.
Tramways Orders Confirmation (No. 4) Act 1884	47 & 48 Vict. c. cii	14 July 1884
An Act to confirm certain Provisional Orders made by the Board of Trade under the Tramways Act, 1870, relating to Colchester Tramways, Gravesend, Rosherville, and Northfleet Tramways (Extension), Hartlepools Tramways (Extension), Stockton-on-Tees Tramways (Extension), and Weymouth Tramways.
	Colchester Tramways Order 1884 Order authorising the construction of Tramways in connexion with authorised Tramways in the borough of Colchester in the county of Essex.	
	Gravesend, Rosherville and Northfleet Tramways (Extension) Order 1884 Order authorising. the Gravesend Roşherville and Northfleet -Tramways Company (Limited) to construct additional Tramways in the parish of Northfleet in the county of Kent.	
	Hartlepools Tramways Order 1884 Order authorising the Hartlepools Steam Tramways Company (Limited) to construct additional Tramways in West Hartlepool in the county of Durham and amending the Hartlepool Tramways Order 1883 and for other purposes.	
	Stockton-on-Tees and District Tramways (Extension) Order 1884 Order authorising the Stockton and Darlington Steam Tramways Company (Limited) to extend their Tramways from Stockton to South Stockton and for other purposes.	
	Weymouth Tramways Order 1884 Order authorising the construction of Tramways in the borough of Weymouth in the county of Dorset.	
Education Department Provisional Order Confirmation (London) Act 1884	47 & 48 Vict. c. ciii	14 July 1884
An Act to confirm a Provisional Order made by the Education Department under the Elementary Education Act, 1870, (Note: Elementary Education Act 1870 (33 & 34 Vict. c. 75)) to enable the School Board for London to put in force the Lands Clauses Consolidation Act, 1845, (Note: Lands Clauses Consolidation Act 1845 (8 & 9 Vict. c. 18)) and the Acts amending the same.
	The School Board for London. Provisional Order for putting in force the Lands Clauses Consolidation Act, 1845.	
Local Government Board (Ireland) Provisional Order Confirmation (Dundalk Waterworks) Act 1884	47 & 48 Vict. c. civ	14 July 1884
An Act to confirm a Provisional Order of the Local Government Board for Ireland relating to Waterworks in the town of Dundalk.
	Dundalk Waterworks Provisional Order 1884 Dundalk Waterworks. Provisional Order.	
Local Government Board (Ireland) Provisional Orders Confirmation (Naas and Thurles) Act 1884	47 & 48 Vict. c. cv	14 July 1884
An Act to confirm certain Provisional Orders of the Local Government Board for Ireland relating to the Naas Burial Ground and the Town of Thurles.
	Naas Burial Ground Provisional Order 1884 Naas Burial Ground. Provisional Order.	
	Thurles Provisional Order 1884 Town of Thurles.	
Local Government Board (Ireland) Provisional Order Confirmation (Carrick-on-Suir Union) Act 1884	47 & 48 Vict. c. cvi	14 July 1884
An Act to confirm a Provisional Order of the Local Government Board for Ireland under the Labourers (Ireland) Act, 1883, relating to the Carrick-on-Suir Union.
	Carrick-on-Suir Union Labourers Order 1884 Provisional Order in pursuance of the Labourers (Ireland) Act, 1883, authorising the purchase and taking of Land otherwise than by agreement.	
Tramways Orders Confirmation (No. 3) Act 1884	47 & 48 Vict. c. cvii	14 July 1884
An Act to confirm certain Provisional Orders made by the Board of Trade under the Tramways Act, 1870, relating to Barrow-in-Furness Tramways, North Birmingham Tramways, and South Birmingham Tramways.
	Barrow-in-Furness Tramways Order 1884 Order authorising the construction of Tramways in the borough of Barrow-in-Furness, in the county of Lancaster.	
	North Birmingham Tramways Order 1884 Order authorising the Construction of Tramways in the Parishes of Birmingham and Aston in the County of Warwick; and amending the North Birmingham Tramways Order, 1883.	
	South Birmingham Tramways Order 1884 Order authorising the construction of tramways in the parish of Edgbaston, in the county of Warwick, and in the parish of Yardley, in the county of Worcester, and amending the South Birmingham Tramways Order, 1883.	
Aberdeen Improvement Confirmation Act 1884 (repealed)	47 & 48 Vict. c. cviii	14 July 1884
An Act to confirm a Provisional Order made under the Artizans and Labourers Dwellings Improvement (Scotland) Acts, 1875 (Note: Artisans and Labourers Dwellings Improvement (Scotland) Act 1875 (38 & 39 Vict. c. 49)) and 1880, (Note: Artizans and Labourers Dwellings Improvement (Scotland) Act 1880 (43 Vict. c. 2)) relating to the improvement of the Burgh of Aberdeen. (Repealed by Aberdeen Corporation (Administration Finance, &c.) Order Confirmation Act 1940 (3 & 4 Geo. 6. c. iii))
	Aberdeen (Artizans Dwellings) Improvement Scheme.	
Kirkintilloch Sewage Confirmation Act 1884	47 & 48 Vict. c. cix	14 July 1884
An Act to confirm a Provisional Order made under the Public Health (Scotland) Act, 1867, (Note: Public Health (Scotland) Act 1867 (30 & 31 Vict. c. 101)) relating to the Burgh of Kirkintilloch.
	Kirkintilloch Order 1884 Provisional Order. Public Health (Scotland) Act, 1867. (30 & 31 Victoria, c. 101.)	
Local Government Board (Ireland) Provisional Orders Confirmation (Cashel, &c.) Act 1884	47 & 48 Vict. c. cx	14 July 1884
An Act to confirm certain Provisional Orders of the Local Government Board for Ireland under the Labourers (Ireland) Act, 1883, relating to the Unions of Cashel, Clogheen, Navan, and Tipperary.
	Cashel Union Labourers Order 1884 Provisional Order in pursuance of the Labourers (Ireland) Act, 1883, authorising the purchase and taking of Land otherwise than by agreement.	
	Clogheen Union Labourers Order 1884 Provisional Order in pursuance of the Labourers (Ireland) Act, 1883, authorising the purchase and taking of Land otherwise than by agreement.	
	Navan Union Labourers Order 1884 Provisional Order in pursuance of the Labourers (Ireland) Act, 1883, authorising the purchase and taking of Land otherwise than by agreement.	
	Tipperary Union Labourers Order 1884 Provisional Order in pursuance of the Labourers (Ireland) Act, 1883, authorising the. purchase and taking of Land otherwise than by agreement.	
Local Government Board (Ireland) Provisional Orders Confirmation (Delvin, &c.) Act 1884	47 & 48 Vict. c. cxi	14 July 1884
An Act to confirm certain Provisional Orders of the Local Government Board for Ireland under the Labourers (Ireland) Act, 1883, relating to the Unions of Delvin, Fermoy, and Newcastle.
	Delvin Union Labourers Order 1884 Provisional Order in pursuance of the Labourers (Ireland) Act, 1883, authorising the purchase and taking of Land otherwise than by agreement.	
	Fermoy Union Labourers Order 1884 Provisional Order in pursuance of the Labourers (Ireland) Act, 1883, authorising the purchase and taking of Land otherwise than by agreement.	
	Newcastle Union Labourers Order 1884 Provisional Order in pursuance of the Labourers (Ireland) Act, 1883, authorising the purchase and taking of Land otherwise than by agreement.	
Tramways Orders Confirmation (No. 1) Act 1884	47 & 48 Vict. c. cxii	14 July 1884
An Act to confirm certain Provisional Orders made by the Board of Trade under the Tramways Act, 1870, relating to Birmingham and Aston Tramways, Blackpool Tramways, Bootle-cum-Linacre Corporation Tramways, Cardiff Tramways (Extensions), Dudley, Sedgley, and Wolverhampton Tramways, Liverpool Corporation Tramways (Extensions), and Nottingham Tramways.
	Birmingham and Aston Tramways Order 1884 Order authorising the Construction of additional Tramways in the Parish of Aston-juxta-Birmingham, in the County of Warwick; and amending the Birmingham and Aston Tramways Order, 1880, and the Birmingham and Aston Tramways Order, 1882.	
	Blackpool Corporation Tramways Order 1884 Order authorising the Mayor Aldermen and Burgesses of the Borough of Blackpool to construct Tramways in the said Borough.	
	Bootle-cum-Linacre Corporation Tramways Order 1884 Order authorising the Mayor Aldermen and Burgesses of the Borough of Bootle-cum-Linacre in the County of Lancaster to construct further Tramways in and adjoining the said Borough.	
	Cardiff Tramways (Extensions) Order 1884 Order authorising the Cardiff Tramways Company (Limited) to construct additional Tramways in the Borough of Cardiff and County of Glamorgan.	
	Dudley Sedgley and Wolverhampton Tramways Order 1884 Order authorising the use of Steam or any Mechanical Power on the authorised Tramways of the Dudley Sedgley and Wolverhampton Tramways Company Limited.	
	Liverpool Corporation Tramways (Extensions) Order 1884 Order authorizing the Mayor Aldermen and Citizens of the City of Liverpool to construct additional Tramways in the said City.	
	Nottingham Tramways Order 1884 Order authorising the use of Steam Power or any Mechanical Power on the Tramways of the Nottingham Tramways Company (Limited).	
Local Government Board's Provisional Orders Confirmation (Poor Law) (No. 11) Act 1884	47 & 48 Vict. c. cxiii	14 July 1884
An Act to confirm certain Orders of the Local Government Board under the provisions of the Divided Parishes and Poor Law Amendment Act, 1876, as amended and extended by the Poor Law Act, 1879, and the Divided Parishes and Poor Law Amendment Act, 1882, relating to the Parishes of Bisley, Bratton Clovelly, Broadwood Widger, Chittlehampton, Cranham, East Worlington (two), Haresfield, Hay, Lapford, Llowes, Meshaw, Miserdine, Randwick (two), Standish, Stonehouse, Thelbridge, West Worlington, Wifcheridge (two), and Woolfardisworthy.
	East Worlington, Lapford, Meshaw, Thelbridge, Witheridge, and Woolfardisworthy Order 1884 Crediton and South Molton Unions.	
	Hay and Llowes Order 1884 Hay Union.	
	Bratton Clovelly and Broadwood Widger Order 1884 Launceston and Okehampton Unions.	
	Chittlehampton Order 1884 South Molton Union.	
	East Worlington, West Worlington, and Witheridge Order 1884 South Molton Union.	
	Bisley, Cranham, Miserdine, Randwick, and Stonehouse Order 1884 Stroud Union.	
	Haresfield, Randwick, and Standish Order 1884 Stroud and Wheatenhurst Unions.	
Local Government Board's Provisional Order Confirmation (Poor Law) (No. 14) Act 1884	47 & 48 Vict. c. cxiv	14 July 1884
An Act to confirm an Order of the Local Government Board under the provisions of the Divided Parishes and Poor Law Amendment Act, 1876, as amended and extended by the Poor Law Act, 1879, and the Divided Parishes and Poor Law Amendment Act, 1882, relating to the Parishes of Dawlish and Kenton.
	Dawlish and Kenton Order 1884 Newton Abbot and Saint Thomas Unions.	
Local Government Board's Provisional Order Confirmation (Poor Law) (No. 15) Act 1884	47 & 48 Vict. c. cxv	14 July 1884
An Act to confirm a Provisional Order of the Local Government Board under the provisions of the Poor Law Amendment Act, 1867, as amended by the Poor Law Amendment Act, 1868, and extended by the Poor Law Act, 1879, relating to the Parish of Saint Luke (Middlesex).
	Saint Luke (Middlesex) Order 1884 Provisional Order for partially repealing, altering, and amending a Local Act. (Note: St. Luke, Middlesex, Poor Relief Act 1808 (48 Geo. 3. c. xcvii))	
Local Government Board (Ireland) Provisional Order Confirmation (Nenagh Union) Act 1884	47 & 48 Vict. c. cxvi	14 July 1884
An Act to confirm a Provisional Order of the Local Government Board for Ireland under the Labourers (Ireland) Act, 1883, relating to the Nenagh Union.
	Nenagh Union Labourers Order 1884 Provisional Order in pursuance of the Labourers (Ireland) Act, 1883, authorising the purchase and taking of Land otherwise than by agreement.	
Swanage Water Act 1884 (repealed)	47 & 48 Vict. c. cxvii	14 July 1884
An Act to authorise the Construction of additional Water Works at Swanage in the county of Dorset and for other purposes. (Repealed by Swanage Gas and Water Act 1901 (1 Edw. 7. c. cxxv))
Ventnor Local Board Act 1884 (repealed)	47 & 48 Vict. c. cxviii	14 July 1884
An Act to empower the Local Board for the District of the Town of Ventnor in the Isle of Wight to construct a Pier and to acquire Lands for Street Improvements and other purposes; and to confer further powers upon the said Local Board: and for other purposes. (Repealed by Ventnor Harbour Revision Order 1994 (SI 1994/2298))
Cork Butter Market Act 1884	47 & 48 Vict. c. cxix	14 July 1884
An Act for the permanent Establishment Regulation and Management of the Butter Market of the City of Cork and for other purposes.
Belfast and County Down Railway (Bangor Transfer) Act 1884	47 & 48 Vict. c. cxx	14 July 1884
An Act to transfer to the Belfast and County Down Railway Company the Belfast Holywood and Bangor Railway; and for other purposes.
Liverpool Hydraulic Power Act 1884	47 & 48 Vict. c. cxxi	14 July 1884
An Act for incorporating and conferring Powers upon the Liverpool Hydraulic Power Company and for other purposes.
Newport (Monmouthshire) Hydraulic Power Act 1884	47 & 48 Vict. c. cxxii	14 July 1884
An Act for incorporating and conferring powers upon the Newport (Monmouthshire) Hydraulic Power Company and for other purposes.
Rochdale Corporation Act 1884	47 & 48 Vict. c. cxxiii	14 July 1884
An Act to provide for the consolidation of the Loans of the Corporation of Rochdale and the conversion of those Loans into Stock; and to alter the Charges made by the Corporation for a supply of Water; and for other purposes.
Ballyclare, Ligoniel and Belfast Junction Railway (Extension of Time) Act 1884	47 & 48 Vict. c. cxxiv	14 July 1884
An Act to extend the periods for the compulsory purchase of lands for and for the completion of the railways authorised by the Ballyclare Ligoniel and Belfast Junction Railway Act 1881 (Note: Ballyclare, Ligoniel and Belfast Junction Railway Act 1881 (44 & 45 Vict. c. ccxv)) and for other purposes.
Belfast Street Tramways Act 1884	47 & 48 Vict. c. cxxv	14 July 1884
An Act to empower the Belfast Street Tramways Company to construct additional Tramways to raise further money and for other purposes.
Great Southern and Western Railway (Tullow Extension) Act 1884	47 & 48 Vict. c. cxxvi	14 July 1884
An Act for enabling the Great Southern and Western Railway Company to extend their railway to Tullow in the county of Carlow; and for other purposes.
Cork and Bandon and Clonakilty Extension Railways Act 1884	47 & 48 Vict. c. cxxvii	14 July 1884
An Act to extend the time limited by the Clonakilty Extension Railway Act 1881 (Note: Clonakilty Extension Railway Act 1881 (44 & 45 Vict. c. ccxvi)) for the purchase of Lands and the completion of the Railway by that Act authorised; to authorise the Cork and Bandon Railway Company to subscribe towards the construction of such Railway and to convert certain debenture shares into debenture stock; and for other purposes.
Belfast and Northern Counties Railway Act 1884	47 & 48 Vict. c. cxxviii	14 July 1884
An Act to authorise the Belfast and Northern Counties Railway Company to construct Tramways from Broughshane to Clonetrace and from Retreat to Cushendall; to vest the Undertaking of the Ballymena Cushendall and Redbay Railway Company in the Belfast and Northern Counties Railway Company; to authorise that Company to purchase Hotels and to make agreements with the Belfast Harbour Commissioners and the Londonderry Port and Harbour Commissioners; and for other purposes.
Caledonian Railway (No. 1) Act 1884	47 & 48 Vict. c. cxxix	14 July 1884
An Act for enabling the Caledonian Railway Company to construct certain Railways and other Works in the Counties of Renfrew, Forfar, Stirling, and Clackmannan, to acquire and complete the Alloa Railway, and to take in lease the Moffat Railway; for extending the time for completing the Alloa Railway; for dissolving the Alloa Railway Company; for abandoning the Larbert and Grangemouth Connecting Lines of the Caledonian Railway Company, and confirming an agreement between that Company and the North British Railway Company with respect to the use of the Stirlingshire Midland Junction and Grangemouth Railways and other matters; and for other purposes.
City of Dublin Steam Packet Company's Act 1884 (repealed)	47 & 48 Vict. c. cxxx	14 July 1884
An Act for making the Railway and Canal Traffic Acts applicable to the City of Dublin Steam Packet Company in relation to their Holyhead and Kingstown Mail Contract Service; and for other purposes. (Repealed by Statute Law (Repeals) Act 2013 (c. 2))
Coventry Corporation (Gas Purchase) Act 1884 (repealed)	47 & 48 Vict. c. cxxxi	14 July 1884
An Act to authorise the Corporation of the City of Coventry to purchase the Undertaking of the Coventry Gas Company; and to confer further powers on the Corporation. (Repealed by West Midlands County Council Act 1980 (c. xi))
Lancashire and Yorkshire and London and North Western Railways (Preston and Wyre Railway) Act 1884	47 & 48 Vict. c. cxxxii	14 July 1884
An Act for conferring further powers upon the Lancashire and Yorkshire Railway Company and the London and North Western Railway Company in respect of their Preston and Wyre Railway and for other purposes.
Caldicot and Wentlooge Level Act 1884	47 & 48 Vict. c. cxxxiii	14 July 1884
An Act to provide for the Commutation of the Liability of Landowners in the Levels of the Hundreds of Caldicot and Wentlooge in the County of Monmouth to maintain Seawalls and other Works and to provide for the making and maintaining of Roads in the said Levels and for other Purposes.
Jarrow Improvement Act 1884	47 & 48 Vict. c. cxxxiv	14 July 1884
An Act to extend the powers of the Corporation of the Borough of Jarrow in the County of Durham with respect to the local government and improvement of the Borough; to extend the boundary of the Borough; and for other purposes.
London, Tilbury and Southend Railway Act 1884	47 & 48 Vict. c. cxxxv	14 July 1884
An Act to confer further powers on the London Tilbury and Southend Railway Company.
Woolwich Equitable Gas Act 1884	47 & 48 Vict. c. cxxxvi	14 July 1884
An Act for the granting of further powers to the Woolwich Equitable Gas Company.
Cranbrook and Paddock Wood Railway Act 1884	47 & 48 Vict. c. cxxxvii	14 July 1884
An Act to extend the periods respectively limited for the construction of the Cranbrook and Paddock Wood Railway and for the compulsory purchase of lands required for the said railway and the deviations thereof.
Newry Navigation Act 1884	47 & 48 Vict. c. cxxxviii	14 July 1884
An Act to confer further powers on the Newry Navigation Company and for other purposes.
Treferig Valley Railway (Lease) Act 1884	47 & 48 Vict. c. cxxxix	14 July 1884
An Act to authorise the Treferig Valley Railway Company to lease their Railway to the Taff Vale Railway Company and for other purposes.
Abercarn and Newbridge Gas and Water Act 1884	47 & 48 Vict. c. cxl	14 July 1884
An Act for dissolving the Abercam and Newbridge Gas and Water Company Limited and re-incorporating the Members thereof with others and for enabling them to supply Gas and Water in the parishes of Mynyddyslwyn and Llanhilleth in the county of Monmouth and for other purposes.
Croydon Corporation Act 1884 (repealed)	47 & 48 Vict. c. cxli	14 July 1884
An Act for making further provision for the better government and for the preservation of the Health of the Inhabitants of the borough of Croydon to authorise the creation of Corporation Stock and for other purposes. (Repealed by Croydon Corporation Act 1960 (8 & 9 Eliz. 2. c. xl))
East London Railway Whitechapel Junction Act 1884	47 & 48 Vict. c. cxlii	14 July 1884
An Act to provide for the working and rental of the East London Railway Whitechapel Junction and for other purposes.
Great Southern and Western Railway (Additional Powers) Act 1884	47 & 48 Vict. c. cxliii	14 July 1884
An Act to authorise the Great Southern and Western Railway Company to make a railway in substitution for a portion of the existing Cork and Youghal and Great Southern and Western Junction Railway; to remove and replace a certain bridge; to divert and stop up certain roads; to acquire additional lands; and for other purposes.
Kenmare Junction Railway Act 1884 (repealed)	47 & 48 Vict. c. cxliv	14 July 1884
An Act to authorise the Cork and Kenmare Railway Company to construct a branch railway from Loo Bridge to Headfort in the county of Kerry to abandon so much of the railway authorised by the Cork and Kenmare Railway Act 1881 (Note: Cork and Kenmare Railway Act 1881 (44 & 45 Vict. c. cxciv)) as lies between Macroom and Loo Bridge to reduce the Company’s capital and borrowing powers to alter baronial guarantees and for other purposes. (Repealed by Kenmare Junction Railway (Abandonment) Act 1890 (53 & 54 Vict. c. xlviii))
Lancashire and Yorkshire Railway Act 1884	47 & 48 Vict. c. cxlv	14 July 1884
An Act for conferring further powers on the Lancashire and Yorkshire Railway Company with relation to their own undertaking and undertakings in which they are jointly interested and for other purposes.
Manchester, Sheffield and Lincolnshire Railway (Additional Powers) Act 1884	47 & 48 Vict. c. cxlvi	14 July 1884
An Act to authorise the Manchester Sheffield and Lincolnshire Railway Company to construct a new Railway and other works and to confer further powers upon that Company in connection with their undertaking and for other purposes.
South East Metropolitan Tramways Act 1884	47 & 48 Vict. c. cxlvii	14 July 1884
An Act for making Tramways in the Parishes of Greenwich Lewisham and St. Paul Deptford in the County of Kent; and for other purposes.
London, Chatham and Dover Railway (Further Powers) Act 1884	47 & 48 Vict. c. cxlviii	14 July 1884
An Act to authorise the London Chatham and Dover Railway Company to construct railways and works in the counties of Surrey and Kent and in the city of London and for other purposes.
Tees Conservancy Act 1884 (repealed)	47 & 48 Vict. c. cxlix	14 July 1884
An Act for extending the Limits of Jurisdiction of the Tees Conservancy Commissioners; for conferring further powers on the Commissioners; for amending the Tees Conservancy Acts; and for other purposes. (Repealed by Tees and Hartlepools Port Authority Act 1966 (c. xxv))
Society of Solicitors at Law of Edinburgh Act 1884	47 & 48 Vict. c. cl	14 July 1884
An Act for regulating the Society of Solicitors before the Courts of the Commissary the Sheriff and City of Edinburgh commonly called the Society oi Solicitors at Law for making provision for the present and contingent liabilities thereof for the distribution of the Funds and the ultimate dissolution, of the Society and for other relative purposes.
Llanfairfechan Waterworks Act 1884	47 & 48 Vict. c. cli	14 July 1884
An Act for reincorporating and conferring powers on the Llanfairfechan Waterworks Company Limited.
Llanfrechfa Upper Local Board Waterworks Act 1884 (repealed)	47 & 48 Vict. c. clii	14 July 1884
An Act to empower the Llanfrechfa Upper Local Board to make Waterworks and supply Water; and for other purposes. (Repealed by Llanfrechfa Upper and Llantarnam Water Board Act 1929 (19 & 20 Geo. 5. c. xlv))
Teign Valley Railway Act 1884	47 & 48 Vict. c. cliii	14 July 1884
An Act to confer further powers on the Teign Valley Railway Company.
Local Government Board (Ireland) Provisional Order Confirmation (Tipperary Union No. 2) Act 1884	47 & 48 Vict. c. cliv	28 July 1884
An Act to confirm a Provisional Order of the Local Government Board for Ireland under the Labourers Act, 1883, relating to the Tipperary Union.
	Tipperary Union Labourers Order (No. 2) 1884 Provisional Order in pursuance of the Labourers (Ireland) Act, 1883, authorising the purchase and taking of Land otherwise than by agreement.	
Benefices (Tiverton Portions) Consolidation Amendment Act 1884	47 & 48 Vict. c. clv	28 July 1884
An Act to amend certain provisions of the Acts third and fourth Victoria, chapter one hundred and thirteen, (Note: Ecclesiastical Commissioners Act 1840 (3 & 4 Vict. c. 113)) and thirty-second and thirty-third Victoria, chapter ninety-four, (Note: New Parishes Acts and Church Building Acts Amendment Act 1869 (32 & 33 Vict. c. 94)) in relation to the Consolidation of Benefices called "Medieties," or "Portions," and to extend the same to the parish of Tiverton, in the county of Devon.
Local Government Board (Ireland) Provisional Order Confirmation (Enniscorthy, &c.) Act 1884	47 & 48 Vict. c. clvi	28 July 1884
An Act to confirm Provisional Orders of the Local Government Board for Ireland under the Labourers (Ireland) Act, 1883, relating to the Unions of Enniscorthy, Clonakilty, Gorey, Killadysert, and Shillelagh.
	Enniscorthy Union Labourers Order 1884 Provisional Order in pursuance of the Labourers (Ireland) Act, 1883, authorising the purchase and taking of Land otherwise than by agreement.	
	Clonakilty Union Labourers Order 1884 Provisional Order in pursuance of the Labourers (Ireland) Act, 1883, authorising the purchase and taking of Land otherwise than by agreement.	
	Gorey Union Labourers Order 1884 Provisional Order in pursuance of the Labourers (Ireland) Act, 1883, authorising the purchase and taking of Land otherwise than by agreement.	
	Killadysert Union Labourers Order 1884 Provisional Order in pursuance of the Labourers (Ireland) Act, 1883, authorising the purchase and taking of Land otherwise than by agreement.	
	Shillelagh Union Labourers Order 1884 Provisional Order in pursuance of the Labourers (Ireland) Act, 1883, authorising the purchase and taking of Land otherwise than by agreement.	
Local Government Board's Provisional Order Confirmation (Salt Works) Act 1884	47 & 48 Vict. c. clvii	28 July 1884
An Act to confirm a Provisional Order of the Local Government Board under the provisions of the Alkali, &c. Works Regulation Act, 1881, (Note: Alkali, &c. Works Regulation Act 1881 (44 & 45 Vict. c. 37)) relating to Salt Works.
	Salt Works Order 1884 Provisional Order under Section 10 of the Alkali, &c. Works Regulation Act, 1881.	
Local Government Board's Provisional Orders Confirmation (No. 2) Act 1884	47 & 48 Vict. c. clviii	28 July 1884
An Act to confirm certain Provisional Orders of the Local Government Board relating to the Local Government Districts of Dorking and Hendon, the Rural Sanitary District of the Kingston Union, the Local Government District of Malvern, the Borough of Portsmouth, the City of Truro, and the Local Government Districts of Wimbledon and Ystradyfodwg.
	Dorking Order 1884 Provisional Order to enable the Sanitary Authority for the Urban Sanitary District of Dorking to put in force the Compulsory Clauses of the Lands Clauses Consolidation Acts.	
	Hendon Order 1884 Provisional Order to enable the Sanitary Authority for the Urban Sanitary District of Hendon to put in force the Compulsory Clauses of the Lands Clauses Consolidation Acts.	
	Kingston Union Order 1884 Provisional Order to enable the Sanitary Authority for the Rural Sanitary District of the Kingston Union to put in force the Compulsory Clauses of the Lands Clauses Consolidation Acts.	
	Malvern Order 1884 Provisional Order to enable the Sanitary Authority for the Urban Sanitary District of Malvern to put in force the Compulsory Clauses of the Lands Clauses Consolidation Acts.	
	Portsmouth Order 1884 Provisional Order to enable the Urban Sanitary Authority for the Borough of Portsmouth to put in force the Compulsory Clauses of the Lands Clauses Consolidation Acts.	
	Truro Order 1884 Provisional Order to enable the Urban Sanitary Authority for the City of Truro to put in force the Compulsory Clauses of the Lands Clauses Consolidation Acts.	
	Wimbledon Order 1884 Provisional Order to enable the Sanitary Authority for the Urban Sanitary District of Wimbledon to put in force the Compulsory Clauses of the Lands Clauses Consolidation Acts.	
	Ystradyfodwg Order 1884 Provisional Order to enable the Sanitary Authority for the Urban Sanitary District of Ystradyfodwg to put in force the Compulsory Clauses of the Lands Clauses Consolidation Acts.	
Walton-on-the-Naze and Frinton Improvement Act 1884	47 & 48 Vict. c. clix	28 July 1884
An Act to revive the powers and extend the periods for the compulsory purchase of lands and for the construction of the works authorised by the Walton-on-the-Naze and Frinton Improvement Act 1879 (Note: Walton-on-the-Naze and Frinton Improvement Act 1879) and for other purposes.
Gravesend Town Quay and Pier (Sale) Act 1884	47 & 48 Vict. c. clx	28 July 1884
An Act for the sale of the Gravesend Town Quay and Pier to the London Tilbury and Southend Railway Company; and for other purposes.
Ouse (Lower) Improvement Act 1884	47 & 48 Vict. c. clxi	28 July 1884
An Act to authorise the Undertakers of the Navigation of the Rivers Aire and Calder in the west riding of the county of York to deepen and improve the lower Navigation of the River Ouse and for other purposes.
West Derby Local Board Act 1884	47 & 48 Vict. c. clxii	28 July 1884
An Act to make better provision for the Health Local Government and Improvement of the Local Board district of West Derby in the County of Lancaster and for other purposes.
Caledonian Railway (No. 2) Act 1884	47 & 48 Vict. c. clxiii	28 July 1884
An Act for enabling the Caledonian Railway Company to make a Railway to Gourock, with a quay or pier there, and to connect their railways with the Paisley Canal Line of the Glasgow and South Western Railway Company, with facilities over that Line; for extending the time for the sale of certain superfluous Lands; and for other purposes.
Manchester, Bury, Rochdale and Oldham Steam Tramways Act 1884	47 & 48 Vict. c. clxiv	28 July 1884
An Act for incorporating and conferring Powers on the Manchester Bury Rochdale and Oldham Steam Tramways Company.
Manchester, Sheffield and Lincolnshire Railway (Chester to Connah's Quay) Act 1884	47 & 48 Vict. c. clxv	28 July 1884
An Act to authorise the Manchester Sheffield and Lincolnshire Railway Company to construct a Branch Railway from the Railway of the Cheshire Lines Committee at Chester to Connah's Quay and for other purposes.
Folkestone, Sandgate and Hythe Tramways Act 1884	47 & 48 Vict. c. clxvi	28 July 1884
An Act for making tramways in the county of Kent and for other purposes.
City of London and Southwark Subway Act 1884	47 & 48 Vict. c. clxvii	28 July 1884
An Act to authorise the Construction of a Subway under the River Thames from King William Street in the City of London to Short Street in the Parish of St. Mary Newington in the County of Surrey and for other purposes.
North Metropolitan Tramways Act 1884	47 & 48 Vict. c. clxviii	28 July 1884
An Act for empowering the North Metropolitan Tramways Company to construct New Tramways; and for other purposes.
Perth General Station Act 1884	47 & 48 Vict. c. clxix	28 July 1884
An Act to confer further powers on the Perth General Station Committee; and for other purposes.
Sutton and Willoughby Railway Act 1884	47 & 48 Vict. c. clxx	28 July 1884
An Act for authorising the Construction of Railways in the county of Lincoln to be called the Sutton and Willoughby Railway and for other purposes.
Burry Port and North Western Junction Railway Amendment Act 1884 (repealed)	47 & 48 Vict. c. clxxi	28 July 1884
An Act to extend the time for the compulsory purchase of lands for and for the completion of the railways authorised by the Burry Port and North Western Junction Railway Act 1876 (Note: Burry Port and North Western Junction Railway Act 1876 (39 & 40 Vict. c. lxxiii)) and the Burry Port and North Western Junction Railway Amendment Act 1881 (Note: Burry Port and North Western Junction Railway Amendment Act 1881 (44 & 45 Vict. c. liv)) and for other purposes. (Repealed by Burry Port and North Western Junction Railway (Abandonment) Act 1889 (52 & 53 Vict. c. cliii))
Dundee Suburban Railway Act 1884	47 & 48 Vict. c. clxxii	28 July 1884
An Act for incorporating the Dundee Suburban Railway Company and for other purposes.
South Stockton Local Board (Water) Act 1884 (repealed)	47 & 48 Vict. c. clxxiii	28 July 1884
An Act for empowering the South Stockton Local Board to acquire a share in the waterworks undertaking of the Stockton and Middlesbrough Water Board and for other purposes. (Repealed by Tees Valley Water (Consolidation) Act 1907 (7 Edw. 7. c. lxxx))
Swansea (Corporation) Water Act 1884	47 & 48 Vict. c. clxxiv	28 July 1884
An Act to empower the Mayor Aldermen and Burgesses cf the Borough of Swansea to make and maintain additional Waterworks, to make other provisions in relation to their Waterworks Undertaking to borrow money and for other purposes.
Malvern Hills Act 1884	47 & 48 Vict. c. clxxv	28 July 1884
An Act for the prevention of Encroachments upon the Malvern Hills, and for other purposes.
City of London Free Ferry Act 1884 (repealed)	47 & 48 Vict. c. clxxvi	28 July 1884
An Act to enable the Mayor and Commonalty and Citizens of the City of London to establish a Free Steam Ferry across the River Thames east of London Bridge to apply the income and to raise monies on the security of the rents and profits of the Bridge House Estates and for other purposes. (Repealed by Statute Law (Repeals) Act 2008 (c. 12))
Weston-super-Mare Grand Pier Act 1884	47 & 48 Vict. c. clxxvii	28 July 1884
An Act for incorporating and conferring powers on the Weston-super-Mare Grand Pier Company; and for other purposes.
Bank of South Australia Act 1884	47 & 48 Vict. c. clxxviii	28 July 1884
An Act to continue and extend the powers of the Bank of South Australia and for other purposes.
Lanarkshire and Ayrshire Railway Act 1884	47 & 48 Vict. c. clxxix	28 July 1884
An Act to authorise the Barrmill and Kilwinning Railway Company to construct new Railways; to change the name of the Company; and for other purposes.
Dewsbury Improvement Act 1884	47 & 48 Vict. c. clxxx	28 July 1884
An Act to enable the Mayor Aldermen and Burgesses of the Borough of Dewsbury to make new Streets and Street Improvements and to make further provision for the Improvement and good Government of the Borough and for other purposes.
Dore and Chinley Railway Act 1884	47 & 48 Vict. c. clxxxi	28 July 1884
An Act to incorporate a Company for the Construction of the Dore and Chinley Railway and for other purposes.
Dublin, Wicklow and Wexford Railway (City of Dublin Junction Railways) Act 1884	47 & 48 Vict. c. clxxxii	28 July 1884
An Act to enable the Dublin Wicklow and Wexford Railway Company to construct in the City of Dublin connecting Railways between Westland Row Terminus and the Railways of the Great Northern Railway (Ireland) and the Midland Great Western Railway (Ireland) on the north side of the River Liffey to be called the City of Dublin Junction Railways and for other purposes.
Highland Railway (New Lines) Act 1884	47 & 48 Vict. c. clxxxiii	28 July 1884
An Act to authorise the Highland Railway Company to construct new Railways; and for other purposes.
Highland Railway (Northern Lines Amalgamation) Act 1884	47 & 48 Vict. c. clxxxiv	28 July 1884
An Act to amalgamate the Undertakings of the Highland, the Sutherland, and the Sutherland and Caithness Railway Companies, and the Duke of Sutherland's Railway; and for other purposes.
Metropolitan Railway (Various Powers) Act 1884	47 & 48 Vict. c. clxxxv	28 July 1884
An Act to authorise the Metropolitan Railway Company to deviate parts of the Rickmansworth Extension Railway and Chorley Wood Lane to purchase additional lands to extend the time for compulsory purchase of lands and completion of works to give effect to an arrangement for vesting in them the powers to make and maintain Railway No. 2 authorised by the Metropolitan and District Railways (City Lines and Extensions) Act 1879 (Note: Metropolitan and District Railways (City Lines and Extensions) Act 1879 (42 & 43 Vict. c. cci)) to provide for consolidation of debenture stocks and for other purposes.
Sutton Bridge Dock Act 1884	47 & 48 Vict. c. clxxxvi	28 July 1884
An Act to extend some of the powers of the Sutton Bridge Dock Company to make further provisions with respect to their unissued capital and for other purposes.
Reedness and Swinefleet Drainage Act 1884	47 & 48 Vict. c. clxxxvii	28 July 1884
An Act for incorporating a Board of Drainage Commissioners with powers to drain and improve certain lands in the townships of Reedness and Swinefleet in the parish of Whitgift in the West Riding of the County of York.
Clacton-on-Sea Special Drainage District Amendment Act 1884 (repealed)	47 & 48 Vict. c. clxxxviii	28 July 1884
An Act to alter and amend the Clacton-on-Sea Special Drainage District Act 1880. (Note: Clacton-on-Sea Special Drainage District Act 1880 (43 & 44 Vict. c. xlii)) (Repealed by Clacton (Repeal of Local Enactments) Order 1964 (SI 1964/1927))
Maryport Improvement (Harbour) Act 1884 (repealed)	47 & 48 Vict. c. clxxxix	28 July 1884
An Act to enable the Trustees for the District and Harbour of Maryport to raise a further Sum of Money for the Improvement of the Harbour of Maryport and for other purposes. (Repealed by Maryport Harbour Revision Order 2007 (SI 2007/3463))
North Cornwall Railway Act 1884 (repealed)	47 & 48 Vict. c. cxc	28 July 1884
An Act for constituting a portion of the Railways authorised by "the North Cornwall Railway Act 1882" (Note: North Cornwall Railway Act 1882 (45 & 46 Vict. c. ccliv)) a separate Undertaking; and for other purposes. (Repealed by South Western Railway Act 1913 (3 & 4 Geo. 5. c. lxxxviii))
London Southern Tramways Act 1884	47 & 48 Vict. c. cxci	28 July 1884
An Act to authorise the London Southern Tramways Company to raise additional capital and for other purposes.
North London Tramways Act 1884	47 & 48 Vict. c. cxcii	28 July 1884
An Act to extend the time for constructing the North London Tramways; to empower the North London Tramways Company to raise additional Capital, and for other purposes.
Uxbridge and Rickmansworth Railway Act 1884 (repealed)	47 & 48 Vict. c. cxciii	28 July 1884
An Act to extend the Time for the Compulsory Purchase of Lands for the Uxbridge and Rickmansworth Railway. (Repealed by Statute Law (Repeals) Act 2013 (c. 2))
Wright's Patent Act 1884	47 & 48 Vict. c. cxciv	28 July 1884
An Act for reviving and rendering valid certain Letters Patent granted to Edward Wright for Improvements in Paint Brushes.
Liskeard and Caradon Railway Act 1884	47 & 48 Vict. c. cxcv	28 July 1884
An Act for authorising the Liskeard and Caradon Railway Company to extend their Railway to Launceston and for authorising arrangements between them and the Liskeard and Looe Union Canal Company and for other purposes.
Neath Harbour Act 1884	47 & 48 Vict. c. cxcvi	28 July 1884
An Act to amend the Neath Harbour Acts, to alter the Constitution of the Neath Harbour Commissioners, to authorise the Construction of new Works, and to confirm and regulate the borrowing of moneys, and for other purposes.
West Worthing Waterworks and Baths Act 1884 (repealed)	47 & 48 Vict. c. cxcvii	28 July 1884
An Act for incorporating the West Worthing Waterworks and Baths Company and for vesting the West Worthing Waterworks and Baths in that Company and for other purposes. (Repealed by Worthing Corporation Act 1922 (12 & 13 Geo. 5. c. liv))
South Eastern Railway (Various Powers) Act 1884	47 & 48 Vict. c. cxcviii	28 July 1884
An Act for conferring further powers on the South Eastern Railway Company in respect to their own undertaking and of the undertakings of other Companies.
Birmingham Compressed-Air Power Company's Act 1884	47 & 48 Vict. c. cxcix	28 July 1884
An Act to incorporate and confer powers on the Birmingham Compressed-Air Power Company and for other purposes.
Cleveland Mineral Railway Act 1884	47 & 48 Vict. c. cc	28 July 1884
An Act to revive and extend the powers of the Cleveland Extension Mineral Railway Company.
Southwark and Vauxhall Water Act 1884	47 & 48 Vict. c. cci	28 July 1884
An Act for conferring further powers on the Southwark and Vauxhall Water Company.
Taff Vale Railway Act 1884	47 & 48 Vict. c. ccii	28 July 1884
An Act to empower the Taff Vale Railway Company to construct a New Railway at Cardiff and to acquire additional Lands and to raise further Capital and for other purposes.
Stockton and Middlesbrough Corporations Waterworks Act 1884	47 & 48 Vict. c. cciii	28 July 1884
An Act to amend the Stockton and Middlesbrough Corporations Waterworks Act 1876 (Note: Stockton and Middlesbrough Corporations Waterworks Act 1876 (39 & 40 Vict. c. ccxxx)) and to confer further powers upon the Corporations of the Boroughs of Stockton-on-Tees and Middlesbrough and the Stockton and Middlesbrough Water Board for the supply of Water to the said Boroughs and their neighbourhoods and for other purposes.
Eastern Bengal Railway Company Purchase Act 1884 (repealed)	47 & 48 Vict. c. cciv	28 July 1884
An Act to provide for the vesting of the undertaking of the Eastern Bengal Railway Company in the Secretary of State in Council of India and for other purposes. (Repealed by Statute Law (Repeals) Act 2013 (c. 2))
Great North of Scotland Railway Act 1884	47 & 48 Vict. c. ccv	28 July 1884
An Act to enable the Great North of Scotland Railway Company to extend their Railway to Rosehearty, in the County of Aberdeen, and for other purposes.
Great Western Railway (No. 2) Act 1884	47 & 48 Vict. c. ccvi	28 July 1884
An Act to authorise the Great Western Railway Company to make and maintain certain railways in the county of Gloucester and to acquire lands and to confer further powers upon that Company and the Corporation of Carmarthen the Swindon and Cheltenham Extension Railway Company and the Llanelly Harbour and Burry Navigation Commissioners; and for other purposes.
London and North Western Railway Act 1884	47 & 48 Vict. c. ccvii	28 July 1884
An Act for conferring further powers upon the London and North Western Railway Company in relation to their own undertaking and other undertakings in which they are interested jointly with other companies and also for conferring powers upon the North Staffordshire Railway Company the Great Western Railway Company the Lancashire and Yorkshire Railway Company and the Manchester Sheffield and Lincolnshire Railway Company in relation to such other undertakings and upon the Manchester South Junction and Altrincham Railway Company in relation to their own undertaking and for vesting in the London and North Western Railway Company the undertaking of the Vale of Towy Railway Company and for other purposes.
Northampton Corporation Waterworks Act 1884 (repealed)	47 & 48 Vict. c. ccviii	28 July 1884
An Act to provide for a further Supply of Water to the Town of Northampton and adjacent Places and for other purposes. (Repealed by Northampton Act 1988 (c. xxix))
Strensall Common Act 1884	47 & 48 Vict. c. ccix	7 August 1884
An Act to provide for ascertaining any Rights of Common or other rights in or over Strensall Common, in the North Riding of the county of York, and for the acquisition and compensation of such rights, and the use of the said Common and adjoining land for military and other purposes.
Local Government Board's Provisional Orders Confirmation (No. 4) Act 1884	47 & 48 Vict. c. ccx	7 August 1884
An Act to confirm certain Provisional Orders of the Local Government Board relating to the Local Government District of Arlecdon and Frizington, the Borough of Bradford (Yorks), the Falmouth United Sewerage District, the Special Drainage District of Flaxley, the Local Government Districts of Holmfirth and Lindfield, the Borough of Over Darwen, the Local Government Districts of Rothwell and Saint Mary Church, and the Warwick Joint Hospital District.
	Arlecdon and Frizington Order 1884 Provisional Order for altering the Arlecdon and Frizington Water Act, 1879. (Note: Arlecdon and Frizington Water Act 1879 (42 & 43 Vict. c. cxxxi))	
	Bradford Order 1884 Provisional Order for altering and amending certain Local Acts. (Note: Bradford Corporation Gas and Improvement Act 1871 (34 & 35 Vict. c. xciv)) (Note: Bradford Improvement Act 1873 (36 & 37 Vict. c. clxvii)) (Note: Bradford Waterworks and Improvement Act 1875 (38 & 39 Vict. c. lxxx)) (Note: Bradford Water and Improvement Act 1878 (41 & 42 Vict. c. cxxxiii))	
	Falmouth Order 1884 Provisional Order for constituting a United District under Section 323 of the Public Health Act, 1875. (Note: Public Health Act 1875 (38 & 39 Vict. c. 55))	
	Flaxley Order 1884 Provisional Order for dissolving the Special Drainage District of Flaxley; and for other purposes.	
	Holmfirth Order 1884 Provisional Order for extending a Local Government District, and for other purposes.	
	Lindfield Order 1884 Provisional Order for dissolving the Local Government District of Lindfield.	
	Over Darwen Order 1884 Provisional Order for altering the Over Darwen Improvement Act, 1879. (Note: Over Darwen Improvement Act 1879 (42 & 43 Vict. c. ccii))	
	Rothwell Order 1884 Provisional Order for altering the area of the Local Government District of Rothwell.	
	Saint Mary Church Order 1884 Provisional Order for partially repealing, altering, and amending the Saint Mary Church Local Board Act, 1868. (Note: St. Mary Church Local Board Act 1868 (31 & 32 Vict. c. cxxix))	
	Warwick Joint Hospital Order 1884 Provisional Order for forming a United District under Sect. 279 of the Public Health Act, 1875.	
Local Government Board's Provisional Orders Confirmation (No. 5) Act 1884	47 & 48 Vict. c. ccxi	7 August 1884
An Act to confirm certain Provisional Orders of the Local Government Board relating to the City and County of Bristol, the Cities of Carlisle and Coventry, the Local Government District of Northwich, the Borough of Preston, the Rural Sanitary District of the Taunton Union, and the Borough of Warrington.
	Bristol Order 1884 Provisional Order to enable the Urban Sanitary Authority for the City and County of Bristol to put in force the Compulsory Clauses of the Lands Clauses Consolidation Acts.	
	Carlisle Order 1884 Provisional Order to enable the Urban Sanitary Authority for the City of Carlisle to put in force the Compulsory Clauses of the Lands Clauses Consolidation Acts.	
	Coventry Order 1884 Provisional Order to enable the Urban Sanitary Authority for the City of Coventry to put in force the Compulsory Clauses of the Lands Clauses Consolidation Acts.	
	Northwich Order 1884 Provisional Order to enable the Sanitary Authority for the Urban Sanitary District of Northwich to put in force the Compulsory Clauses of the Lands Clauses Consolidation Acts.	
	Preston Order 1884 Provisional Order to enable the Urban Sanitary Authority for the Borough of Preston to put in force the Compulsory Clauses of the Lands Clauses Consolidation Acts.	
	Taunton Union Order 1884 Provisional Order to enable the Sanitary Authority for the Rural Sanitary District of the Taunton Union to put in force the Compulsory Clauses of the Lands Clauses Consolidation Acts.	
	Warrington Order 1884 Provisional Order to enable the Urban Sanitary Authority for the Borough of Warrington to put in force the Compulsory Clauses of the Lands Clauses Consolidation Acts.	
Local Government Board's Provisional Orders Confirmation (No. 6) Act 1884	47 & 48 Vict. c. ccxii	7 August 1884
An Act to confirm certain Provisional Orders of the Local Government Board relating to the Improvement Act District of Bournemouth, the Special Drainage District of Clacton-on-Sea, the Local Government District of Farnham, the Boroughs of Hythe and Margate, the Improvement Act Districts of Milton-next-Sittingbourne and West Worthing, and the City of Winchester.
	Bournemouth Order 1884 Provisional Order for altering and extending the provisions of a Local Act (Note: Bournemouth Improvement Act 1856 (19 & 20 Vict. c. xc)) and certain Confirming Acts. (Note: Local Government Supplemental Act 1869 (32 & 33 Vict. c. cxxiv)) (Note: Local Government Board's Provisional Orders Confirmation (Bilbrough, &c.) Act 1876 (39 & 40 Vict. c. cciii)) (Note: Local Government Board's Provisional Orders Confirmation (Bournemouth, &c.) Act 1878 (41 & 42 Vict. c. clxii))	
	Clacton-on-Sea Order 1884 Provisional Order for dissolving the Special Drainage District of Clacton-on-Sea; and for other purposes.	
	Farnham Order 1884 Provisional Order for extending the Local Government District of Farnham.	
	Hythe Order 1884 Provisional Order for altering and amending the Hythe Improvement and Waterworks Act, 1874. (Note: Hythe Improvement and Waterworks Act 1874 (37 & 38 Vict. c. lxvi))	
	Margate Order 1884 Provisional Order for altering and amending a Local Act. (Note: Margate Improvement Act 1825 (6 Geo. 4. c. xx))	
	Milton-next-Sittingbourne Order 1884 Provisional Order for partially repealing, altering, and amending a Local Act, (Note: Milton-next-Sittingbourne Improvement Act 1838 (1 & 2 Vict. c. ii)) and a Confirming Act. (Note: Local Government Board's Provisional Orders Confirmation (Arundel, &c.) Act 1876 (39 & 40 Vict. c. xiii))	
	West Worthing Order 1884 Provisional Order for partially repealing, altering, and amending the West Worthing Improvement Act, 1865. (Note: West Worthing Improvement Act 1865 (28 & 29 Vict. c. xxvii))	
	Winchester Order 1884 Provisional Order for altering and amending a Confirming Act. (Note: Local Government Supplemental Act 1866 (29 & 30 Vict. c. 24))	
Local Government Board (Ireland) Provisional Orders Confirmation (Clonmel, &c.) Act 1884	47 & 48 Vict. c. ccxiii	7 August 1884
An Act to confirm certain Provisional Orders of the Local Government Board for Ireland under the Labourers (Ireland) Act, 1883, relating to the Unions of Clonmel, Croom, Glin, Kanturk, Limerick, Lismore, Macroom, Mullingar, Rathkeale, and Wexford.
	Clonmel Union Labourers Order 1884 Provisional Order in pursuance of the Labourers (Ireland) Act, 1883, authorising the purchase and taking of Land otherwise than by agreement.	
	Croom Union Labourers Order 1884 Provisional Order in pursuance of the Labourers (Ireland) Act, 1883, authorising the purchase and taking of Land otherwise than by agreement.	
	Glin Union Labourers Order 1884 Provisional Order in pursuance of the Labourers (Ireland) Act, 1883, authorising the purchase and taking of Land otherwise than by agreement.	
	Kanturk Union Labourers Order 1884 Provisional Order in pursuance of the Labourers (Ireland) Act, 1883, authorising the purchase and taking of Land otherwise than by agreement.	
	Limerick Union Labourers Order 1884 Provisional Order in pursuance of the Labourers (Ireland) Act, 1883, authorising the purchase and taking of Land otherwise than by agreement.	
	Lismore Union Labourers Order 1884 Provisional Order in pursuance of the Labourers (Ireland) Act, 1883, authorising the purchase and taking of Land otherwise than by agreement.	
	Macroom Union Labourers Order 1884 Provisional Order in pursuance of the Labourers (Ireland) Act, 1883, authorising the purchase and taking of Land otherwise than by agreement.	
	Mullingar Union Labourers Order 1884 Provisional Order in pursuance of the Labourers (Ireland) Act, 1883, authorising the purchase and taking of Land otherwise than by agreement.	
	Rathkeale Union Labourers Order 1884 Provisional Order in pursuance of the Labourers (Ireland) Act, 1883, authorising the purchase and taking of Land otherwise than by agreement.	
	Wexford Union Labourers Order 1884 Provisional Order in pursuance of the Labourers (Ireland) Act, 1883, authorising the purchase and taking of Land otherwise than by agreement.	
Local Government Board's Provisional Orders Confirmation (No. 7) Act 1884	47 & 48 Vict. c. ccxiv	7 August 1884
An Act to confirm certain Provisional Orders of the Local Government Board relating to the Accrington and Church Outfall Sewerage District, the Boroughs of Bangor, Barnsley, and Burnley, the Local Government District of Fulwood, the City of Liverpool, the Local Government District of Llanelly, the Borough of Middlesbrough, the Improvement Act District of Milford, and the Borough of Nottingham.
	Accrington and Church Order 1884 Provisional Order for forming a United District under Sect. 279 of the Public Health Act, 1875.	
	Bangor Order 1884 Provisional Order under Section 304 of the Public Health Act, 1875.	
	Barnsley Order 1884 Provisional Order for altering certain Local Acts (Note: Barnsley Improvement Act 1822 (3 Geo. 4. c. xxv)) (Note: Barnsley Local Board Act 1862 (25 & 26 Vict. c. xxxii)) (Note: Barnsley Local Board Amendment Act 1866 (29 & 30 Vict. c. xcviii)) and Confirming Acts. (Note: Public Health Supplemental Act 1853 (No. 1) (16 & 17 Vict. c. 24)) (Note: Local Government Supplemental Act 1860 (23 & 24 Vict. c. 44)) (Note: Local Government Board's Provisional Orders Confirmation (Alnwick Union, &c.) Act 1880 (43 & 44 Vict. c. lxxxiii))	
	Burnley Order 1884 Provisional Order for altering certain Local Acts, (Note: Burnley Borough Improvement Act 1871 (34 & 35 Vict. c. cliv)) (Note: Burnley Borough Improvement Act 1883 (46 & 47 Vict. c. lxxvii)) and Confirming Acts. (Note: Local Government Board's Provisional Orders Confirmation (Belper Union, &c.) Act 1878 (41 & 42 Vict. c. cix)) (Note: Local Government Board's Provisional Orders Confirmation (No. 5) Act 1883 (46 & 47 Vict. c. cxxxvi))	
	Fulwood Order 1884 Provisional Order for altering and amending a Local Act. (Note: Fulwood and Whittingham Water Act 1882 (45 & 46 Vict. c. xi))	
	Liverpool Order 1884 Provisional Order for altering certain Local Acts. (Note: Liverpool Sanitary Amendment Act 1864 (27 & 28 Vict. c. lxxiii)) (Note: Liverpool Corporation Loans Act 1880 (43 & 44 Vict. c. ccvii)) (Note: Liverpool Improvement Act 1882 (45 & 46 Vict. c. lv))	
	Llanelly Order 1884 Provisional Order for altering certain Confirming Acts. (Note: Public Health Supplemental Act 1850 (No. 3) (13 & 14 Vict. c. 108)) (Note: Local Government Supplemental Act 1868 (31 & 32 Vict. c. x))	
	Middlesbrough Order 1884 Provisional Order for altering and amending a Local Act. (Note: Middlesbrough Improvement Act 1877 (40 & 41 Vict. c. xxx))	
	Milford Order 1884 Provisional Order for partially repealing and altering certain Local Acts. (Note: Milford Improvement Act 1857 (20 & 21 Vict. c. lxxiv)) (Note: Milford Improvement Act 1869 (32 & 33 Vict. c. xcvii))	
	Nottingham Order 1884 Provisional Order for altering and amending certain Local Acts (Note: Nottingham and Leen District Sewerage Act 1872 (35 & 36 Vict. c. cv)) (Note: Nottingham Improvement Act 1874 (37 & 38 Vict. c. cxciv)) (Note: Nottingham Borough Extension Act 1877 (40 & 41 Vict. c. xxxi)) (Note: Nottingham Improvement Act 1878 (41 & 42 Vict. c. xci)) and a Confirming Act. (Note: Local Government Board's Provisional Orders Confirmation (Bingley, &c.) Act 1876 (39 & 40 Vict. c. cxcviii))	
Local Government Board's Provisional Orders Confirmation (No. 8) Act 1884	47 & 48 Vict. c. ccxv	7 August 1884
An Act to confirm certain Provisional Orders of the Local Government Board relating to the Borough of Aberavon, the Local Government Districts of Brighouse, and Denton and Haughton, the City of Manchester, and the Local Government Districts of Shipley, Skelton and Brotton, Sowerby Bridge, and Sutton in Ashfield.
	Aberavon Order 1884 Provisional Order for altering and amending certain Local Acts (Note: Aberavon Market Act 1848 (11 & 12 Vict. c. cxxxviii)) (Note: Aberavon Local Board Act 1866 (29 & 30 Vict. c. ccxl)) and a Confirming Act. (Note: Local Government Board's Provisional Orders Confirmation (Aberavon, &c.) Act 1876 (39 & 40 Vict. c. lxxxvii))	
	Brighouse Order 1884 Provisional Order for partially repealing, altering, and amending a Local Act (Note: Brighouse Improvement Act 1846 (9 & 10 Vict. c. ccclxxxv)) and a Confirming Act. (Note: Local Government Supplemental Act 1865 (28 & 29 Vict. c. 24))	
	Denton and Haughton Order 1884 Provisional Order for dissolving a Local Government District, and for partially repealing, altering, and amending certain Local Acts, (Note: Dukinfield and Denton Local Boards (Gas) Act 1877 (40 & 41 Vict. c. cxc)) (Note: Denton and Haughton (Gas) Act 1880 (43 & 44 Vict. c. xvii)) and for other purposes.	
	Manchester Order 1884 Provisional Order for altering the Manchester Corporation Waterworks and Improvement Act, 1875, (Note: Manchester Corporation Waterworks and Improvement Act 1875 (38 & 39 Vict. c. clxi)) and certain other Local Acts (Note: Manchester Markets Act 1847 (10 & 11 Vict. c. xiv)) (Note: Manchester Improvement Act 1860 (23 & 24 Vict. c. xlviii)) (Note: Manchester Improvement Act 1865 (28 & 29 Vict. c. xc)) relating to Markets.	
	Shipley Order 1884 Provisional Order for partially repealing, altering, and amending the Shipley Local Government Act, 1874. (Note: Shipley Local Government Act 1874 (37 & 38 Vict. c. cvii))	
	Skelton and Brotton Order 1884 Provisional Order for extending a Local Government District, and for other purposes.	
	Sowerby Bridge Order 1884 Provisional Order for partially repealing and altering the Sowerby Bridge Gas Act, 1861, (Note: Sowerby Bridge Gas Act 1861 (24 & 25 Vict. c. lxxx)) and the Sowerby Bridge Local Board Act, 1863. (Note: Sowerby Bridge Local Board Act 1863 (26 & 27 Vict. c. lii))	
	Sutton in Ashfield Order 1884 Provisional Order for partially repealing, altering, and amending the Sutton in Ashfield Local Board Gas Act, 1878. (Note: Sutton-in-Ashfield Local Board Gas Act 1878 (41 & 42 Vict. c. clxxii))	
Pier and Harbour Orders Confirmation Act 1884	47 & 48 Vict. c. ccxvi	7 August 1884
An Act to confirm certain Provisional Orders made by the Board of Trade under the General Pier and Harbour Act, 1861, (Note: General Pier and Harbour Act 1861 (24 & 25 Vict. c. 45)) relating to Aldborough, Baltimore and Skibbereen, Carlingford Lough, Chatham, Cromer, Cullen, Dawlish, Eyemouth, Fraserburgh, Hove, and Newlyn.
	Aldborough Pier Order 1884 Order for revising and amending the Aldborough Pier and Improvements Order, 1876.	
	Baltimore and Skibbereen Harbour Order 1884 Order for the maintenance of a Lighthouse, and for the improvement of the Harbour of Baltimore and Skibbereen, and of the River Ilen, in the county of Cork, and for the constitution of a Harbour Authority.	
	Carlingford Lough Improvement Order 1884 Order for the amendment of the Harbour of Carlingford Lough Improvement Orders, 1864, 1868, 1874, and 1875.	
	Chatham Pier Order 1884 Order for the rebuilding and extension of the Sun Pier at Chatham in the county of Kent.	
	Cromer Pier Order 1884 Order for the construction, maintenance, and regulation of a Pier at Cromer in the county of Norfolk.	
	Cullen Harbour Order 1884 Order for the regulation of the Harbour of Cullen, in the county of Banff, the appointment of Harbour Commissioners, and the construction of works, and for other purposes.	
	Dawlish Pier Order 1884 Order for the Construction, Maintenance, and Regulation of a Pier at Dawlish, in the County of Devon.	
	Eyemouth Harbour Order 1884 Order for enabling the Commissioners of Police of the Burgh of Eyemouth, in the County of Berwick, to guarantee Payment of Money raised by the Eyemouth Harbour Trustees.	
	Fraserburgh Harbour Order 1884 Order for the amendment of the Fraserburgh Harbour Act, 1878, (Note: Fraserburgh Harbour Act 1878 (41 & 42 Vict. c. cii)) and for conferring further powers on the Commissioners, and making further provisions with reference to the Harbour.	
	Hove Pier Order 1884 Order for the construction, maintenance, and regulation of a Pier at Hove in the county of Sussex.	
	Newlyn Pier and Harbour Order 1884 Order for the Construction, Maintenance, and Regulation of a Pier, Harbour, and Works, at Newlyn, in the County of Cornwall.	
Tramways (Ireland) Provisional Order (West Clare Railway) Confirmation Act 1884	47 & 48 Vict. c. ccxvii	7 August 1884
An Act to confirm a Provisional Order of the Lord Lieutenant and Privy Council in Ireland relating to the West Clare Railway.
	West Clare Railway Order 1884 The West Clare Railway Order, 1884.	
Tramways (Ireland) Provisional Order Confirmation (Clogher Valley) Act 1884	47 & 48 Vict. c. ccxviii	7 August 1884
An Act to confirm a Provisional Order of the Lord Lieutenant and Privy Council in Ireland relating to the Clogher Valley Tramway.
	Clogher Valley Tramway Order 1884 The Clogher Valley Tramway Order, 1884.	
Belfast Water Act 1884	47 & 48 Vict. c. ccxix	7 August 1884
An Act for providing a better supply of Water to the high-level districts of the borough of Belfast and other places adjacent thereto; for conferring further powers on the Belfast Water Commissioners; and for other purposes.
Coventry and District Tramways Act 1884 (repealed)	47 & 48 Vict. c. ccxx	7 August 1884
An Act to empower the Coventry and District Tramways Company to abandon the construction of one of their authorised Tramways; to extend the time for constructing the remainder of their authorised works, and for other purposes. (Repealed by West Midlands County Council Act 1980 (c. xi))
Bishop's Castle and Montgomery Railway Act 1884 (repealed)	47 & 48 Vict. c. ccxxi	7 August 1884
An Act to authorise the Construction of a Railway from the Bishop's Castle Railway at Lydham in the County of Salop to Montgomery in the County of Montgomery. (Repealed by Bishop's Castle and Montgomery Railway (Abandonment) Act 1887 (50 & 51 Vict. c. lxviii))
Cardiff Corporation Act 1884	47 & 48 Vict. c. ccxxii	7 August 1884
An Act to enable the Mayor Aldermen and Burgesses of the borough of Cardiff in the county of Glamorgan to obtain a supply of Water from the River Taff Fawr in Breconshire; and to make further provision for the improvement and good government of the borough; and for other purposes.
Metropolitan Board of Works (Various Powers) Act 1884	47 & 48 Vict. c. ccxxiii	7 August 1884
An Act for enabling the Metropolitan Board of Works to make certain New Streets in the Metropolis; for amending the Metropolitan Street Improvements Act, 1877; (Note: Metropolitan Street Improvements Act 1877 (40 & 41 Vict. c. ccxxxv)) for conferring further powers upon the said Board with respect to Plumstead Common and Hackney Commons and for other purposes.
Blackpool Railway Act 1884	47 & 48 Vict. c. ccxxiv	7 August 1884
An Act for authorising the construction of a railway in Lancashire, to be called the Blackpool Railway; and for other purposes.
Metropolitan Railway (Hendon Extension) Act 1884	47 & 48 Vict. c. ccxxv	7 August 1884
An Act to empower the Metropolitan Railway Company to extend their Railway to Hendon in the county of Middlesex and for other purposes.
Liverpool Southport and Preston Junction Railway Act 1884	47 & 48 Vict. c. ccxxvi	7 August 1884
An Act to authorise the making of Railways in the County of Lancaster to connect the Railway of the West Lancashire Railway Company with the Railway of the Southport and Cheshire Lines Extension Railway Company and for other purposes.
Mersey Railway Act 1884	47 & 48 Vict. c. ccxxvii	7 August 1884
An Act to authorise the Mersey Railway Company to make a Branch Railway in Birkenhead and for other purposes.
Metropolitan Board of Works (Bridges) Act 1884	47 & 48 Vict. c. ccxxviii	7 August 1884
An Act for enabling the Metropolitan Board of Works to alter the situation of the New Battersea Bridge authorised by "The Metropolitan Bridges Act, 1881" (Note: Metropolitan Bridges Act 1881 (44 & 45 Vict. c. cxcii)) and for other purposes.
Metropolitan District Railway Act 1884	47 & 48 Vict. c. ccxxix	7 August 1884
An Act to confer further powers on the Metropolitan District Railway Company.
West Lancashire Railway (Preston Docks Extension) Act 1884	47 & 48 Vict. c. ccxxx	7 August 1884
An Act to enable the West Lancashire Railway Company to extend their Railway to the Preston Docks in the county of Lancaster and to confer further powers in relation to their Undertaking on the Company and for other purposes.
Plymouth, Devonport and South Western Junction Railway Act 1884	47 & 48 Vict. c. ccxxxi	7 August 1884
An Act for vesting in the Plymouth Devonport and South Western Junction Railway Company the powers conferred by "The Devon and Cornwall Central Railway Act 1882" (Note: Devon and Cornwall Central Railway Act 1882 (45 & 46 Vict. c. ccxxviii)) and for the abandonment of a portion of the Railway authorised by that Act and for the dissolution of the Devon and Cornwall Central Railway Company and for other purposes.
York Extension and Improvement Act 1884	47 & 48 Vict. c. ccxxxii	7 August 1884
An Act for extending the boundaries of the city of York and county of the same city; for consolidating and amending various provisions of the Local Acts in force within the city; and for other purposes.
Leominster and Bromyard Railway Act 1884	47 & 48 Vict. c. ccxxxiii	7 August 1884
An Act to authorise the Leominster and Bromyard Railway Company to complete their authorised Railway from Steens Bridge to Bromyard; and for other purposes.
Chatham and Brompton Tramways Act 1884 (repealed)	47 & 48 Vict. c. ccxxxiv	7 August 1884
An Act for incorporating the Chatham and Brompton Tramways Company and empowering them to construct street tramways in the parishes of Chatham and Gillingham in the county of Kent and for other purposes. (Repealed by Chatham and Brompton Tramways (Abandonment) Act 1888 (51 & 52 Vict. c. xxxv))
Great Western Railway (No. 1) Act 1884	47 & 48 Vict. c. ccxxxv	7 August 1884
An Act for conferring further powers upon the Great Western Railway Company in connexion with their own and other Undertakings and upon them and other Companies in connexion with Undertakings in which they are jointly interested; for vesting in the Great Western Railway Company the Undertakings of the Coleford Railway Company and the Bristol and North Somerset Railway Company; for authorising and confirming agreements between the Great Western Railway Company and other Companies; and for other purposes.
North Pembrokeshire and Fishguard Railway Act 1884	47 & 48 Vict. c. ccxxxvi	7 August 1884
An Act to revive the powers and extend the time for the compulsory Purchase of Lands for and to extend the time for the completion of parts of the Railways of the Rosebush and Fishguard Railway Company to enable that Company to raise additional Capital to change the name of the Company and for other purposes.
Folkestone Pier and Lift Act 1884	47 & 48 Vict. c. ccxxxvii	7 August 1884
An Act for the construction maintenance and regulation of a Pier and Lift at Folkestone in the county of Kent and for other purposes.
Llandrindod Wells Water Act 1884	47 & 48 Vict. c. ccxxxviii	7 August 1884
An Act for incorporating and conferring powers on the Llandrindod Wells Water Company.
Chester Improvement Act 1884	47 & 48 Vict. c. ccxxxix	7 August 1884
An Act to consolidate the city of Chester into one parish; make improved provision for the levying of Rates; provide for the issue of Corporation Stock; make provision as to Markets and Fairs; for freeing the Dee Bridges of Tolls; and for the improvement government and health of the city: to amend the Improvement Act; (Note: Chester Improvement Act 1845 (8 & 9 Vict. c. xv)) and for other purposes.
Plymouth, Devonport and District Tramways Act 1884 (repealed)	47 & 48 Vict. c. ccxl	7 August 1884
An Act to extend the time for the completion of the Tramways authorised by the Plymouth Devonport and District Tramways Act 1882 (Note: Plymouth, Devonport and District Tramways Act 1882 (45 & 46 Vict. c. clix)) and for other purposes. (Repealed by Plymouth Corporation Act 1915 (5 & 6 Geo. 5. c. lxix))
Edinburgh Northern Tramways Act 1884 (repealed)	47 & 48 Vict. c. ccxli	7 August 1884
An Act to authorise the Construction of Street Tramways in certain parts of Edinburgh and Leith; and for other purposes. (Repealed by Edinburgh Corporation Order Confirmation Act 1932 (22 & 23 Geo. 5. c. vii))
Halifax High Level and North and South Junction Railway Act 1884	47 & 48 Vict. c. ccxlii	7 August 1884
An Act for incorporating the Halifax High Level and North and South Junction Railway Company and authorising them to make and maintain the Halifax High Level and North and South Junction Railway and for other purposes.
Poulnasherry Reclamation Act 1884	47 & 48 Vict. c. ccxliii	7 August 1884
An Act to revive and extend the powers of the several Acts relating to the Poulnasherry Reclamation; and for other purposes.
Lea Bridge, Leyton and Walthamstow Tramways (Extensions) Act 1884	47 & 48 Vict. c. ccxliv	7 August 1884
An Act to authorise the Lea Bridge Leyton and Walthamstow Tramways Company to construct new Tramways in the counties of Middlesex anu Essex and for other purposes.
Rotherham and Bawtry Railway Act 1884 (repealed)	47 & 48 Vict. c. ccxlv	7 August 1884
An Act for empowering the Rotherham and Bawtry Railway Company to raise additional Capital; and for other purposes. (Repealed by Rotherham and Bawtry Railway (Abandonment) Act 1888 (51 & 52 Vict. c. cc))
Tendring Hundred Waterworks Act 1884	47 & 48 Vict. c. ccxlvi	7 August 1884
An Act for incorporating and conferring powers on the Tendring Hundred Waterworks Company.
South Western Railway Act 1884	47 & 48 Vict. c. ccxlvii	7 August 1884
An Act for authorising the London and South Western Railway Company to construct additional works and to purchase additional lands and for conferring other powers upon them; for the widening of the Somerset and Dorset Railway; for authorising agreements between the Company and the Wimbledon and West Metropolitan Junction Railway Company; and for other purposes.
Porthdinlleyn Railway Act 1884 (repealed)	47 & 48 Vict. c. ccxlviii	7 August 1884
An Act to authorise the construction of a Railway from Pwllheli to Porthdinlleyn in the county of Carnarvon; and for other purposes. (Repealed by Porthdinlleyn Railway (Abandonment) Act 1892 (55 & 56 Vict. c. xcvi))
West Gloucestershire Water Act 1884	47 & 48 Vict. c. ccxlix	7 August 1884
An Act for incorporating the West Gloucestershire Water Company and conferring powers upon them with reference to the construction of Works and the supply of Water and otherwise, and for other purposes.
Scotch Education Department Provisional Order Confirmation (Ardchattan and Muckairn) Act 1884 (repealed)	47 & 48 Vict. c. ccl	14 August 1884
An Act to confirm a Provisional Order made by the Scotch Education Department under the Education (Scotland) Act, 1878, (Note: Education (Scotland) Act 1878 (41 & 42 Vict. c. 78)) to enable the School Board for Ardchattan and Muckairn, in the county of Argyll, to put in force the Lands Clauses Consolidation (Scotland) Act, 1845, (Note: Lands Clauses Consolidation (Scotland) Act 1845 (8 & 9 Vict. c. 19)) and the Acts amending the same. (Repealed by Statute Law (Repeals) Act 1998 (c. 43))
	Provisional Order for putting in force the Lands Clauses Consolidation (Scotland) Act, 1845.	
Local Government Board (Ireland) Provisional Order Confirmation (Drogheda Union) Act 1884	47 & 48 Vict. c. ccli	14 August 1884
An Act to confirm a Provisional Order of The Local Government Board for Ireland under the Labourers (Ireland) Act 1883, relating to the Drogheda Union.
	Drogheda Union Labourers Order 1884 Provisional Order in pursuance of the Labourers (Ireland) Act, 1883, authorising the purchasing and taking of Land otherwise than by agreement.	
Golden Valley Railway (Hay Extension) Act 1884	47 & 48 Vict. c. cclii	14 August 1884
An Act to enable the Golden Valley Railway Company to abandon a portion of their authorised Railway; to construct new Railways; and for other purposes.
Wirral Railway Act 1884	47 & 48 Vict. c. ccliii	14 August 1884
An Act to authorise the Wirral Railway Company to make a Branch Railway to Birkenhead and for other purposes.
Hull, Barnsley and West Riding Junction Railway and Dock (Money) Act 1884	47 & 48 Vict. c. ccliv	14 August 1884
An Act to authorise the Hull Barnsley and West Riding Junction Railway and Dock Company to raise further money by debentures.
Bristol Dock Act 1884	47 & 48 Vict. c. cclv	14 August 1884
An Act to enable the Mayor Aldermen and Burgesses of the City of Bristol to purchase the Undertakings of the Bristol Port and Channel Dock Company the Bristol Port and Channel Dock Warehouse Company Limited and the Portishead Warehouse Company Limited and the Dock Undertaking of the Bristol and Portishead Pier and Railway Company and for other purposes.
Great Western and Portishead Railways Act 1884	47 & 48 Vict. c. cclvi	14 August 1884
An Act to authorise the Great Western Railway Company to acquire the Pier and Railway Undertaking of the Bristol and Portishead Pier and Railway Company and for other purposes.
Barry Dock and Railways Act 1884 (repealed)	47 & 48 Vict. c. cclvii	14 August 1884
An Act to authorise the Construction of a Dock at Barry Island and Railways and Works in Glamorganshire connected therewith and for other purposes. (Repealed by Vale of Glamorgan (Barry Harbour) Act 1978 (c. xvii))
Easton and Church Hope Railway (Portland Extension) Act 1884	47 & 48 Vict. c. cclviii	14 August 1884
An Act to authorise the Easton and Church Hope Railway Company to make branch railways in the Parish of Portland in the County of Dorset and for other purposes.
South Western and District Railways Act 1884	47 & 48 Vict. c. cclix	14 August 1884
An Act to amend the provisions of the London and South-Western and Metropolitan District Railway Companies (Kingston and London Railway) Act 1882. (Note: London and South-Western and Metropolitan District Railway Companies (Kingston and London Railway) Act 1882 (45 & 46 Vict. c. ccxlviii ))
Medina Subway Act 1884	47 & 48 Vict. c. cclx	14 August 1884
An Act for constructing a Subway or Tunnel between East and West Cowes under the River Medina and approaches thereto and for other purposes.
Milford Docks Act 1884 (repealed)	47 & 48 Vict. c. cclxi	14 August 1884
An Act for empowering the Milford Docks Company to construct railways, and for other purposes. (Repealed by Milford Docks Act 1953 (1 & 2 Eliz. 2. c. x))
Brighton Improvement Act 1884 (repealed)	47 & 48 Vict. c. cclxii	14 August 1884
An Act to increase the number of Aldermen and Councillors of the Borough of Brighton: to authorise the Corporation of the said Borough to make and maintain certain Works and Improvements to provide a New Market to regulate the Race-course and certain Squares and Enclosed Places and Burial Grounds to purchase Lands and to make further provision for the good Government of the Borough and to borrow further moneys: and for other purposes. (Repealed by Brighton Corporation Act 1931 (21 & 22 Geo. 5. c. cix))

=== Private and personal acts ===
Short title	Citation	Royal assent
Long title
Dorrien Smith Estate Act 1884	47 & 48 Vict. c. 1 Pr.	3 July 1884
An Act to enable the Executors and surviving Trustee of the Will of Augustus John Smith Esquire deceased to surrender existing Leases and to accept a new lease of the Scilly Isles and to determine a Trust for Accumulation contained in the said Will and for other purposes.
Belhaven Trust Estate Act 1884	47 & 48 Vict. c. 2 Pr.	3 July 1884
An Act to authorise certain arrangements with regard to the Trust Estate of the late Robert Montgomery Hamilton Lord Belhaven and Stenton, and to empower his Trustee to carry the same into effect.
Hallett's Estate Act 1884	47 & 48 Vict. c. 3 Pr.	14 July 1884
An Act to confirm certain Leases Conveyances and Assignment under the Will of William Hallett Esquire deceased and to give the Trustees powers of leasing and sale and for other purposes.
Winwick Rectory Act 1884	47 & 48 Vict. c. 4 Pr.	7 August 1884
An Act to enable the sale of the glebe lands of the Rectory of Winwick in the county palatine of Lancaster, and the disposal of the proceeds for the endowment of that Rectory, and additional endowments of other Benefices.
Earl of Aylesford's Estate (Amendment) Act 1884	47 & 48 Vict. c. 5 Pr.	14 August 1884
An Act to further amend the Earl of Aylesford's Estate Act, 1882. (Note: Earl of Aylesford's Estate Act 1882 (45 & 46 Vict. c. 3 Pr.))
Earl of Devon's Estate Act 1884	47 & 48 Vict. c. 6 Pr.	14 August 1884
An Act to facilitate the Sale, free from incumbrances, of the Estates in England and Ireland of the Right Honourable William Reginald Earl of Devon and the Honourable Edward Baldwin Courtenay, commonly called Lord Courtenay.

=== Sources ===
- The Public General Statutes, Volume 20: 47 & 48 Victoria – 1884. 4 August 1884 – via Internet Archive.

== 48 & 49 Vict. ==
The sixth session of the 22nd Parliament of the United Kingdom which met from 23 October 1884 until 14 August 1885.

=== Public general acts ===
Short title	Citation	Royal assent
Long title
Additional Income Tax Act 1884 (repealed)	48 & 49 Vict. c. 1	1 December 1884
An Act to grant to Her Majesty additional Rates of Income Tax. (Repealed by Statute Law Revision Act 1898 (61 & 62 Vict. c. 22))
Consolidated Fund (No. 1) Act 1884 (Sess. 2) (repealed)	48 & 49 Vict. c. 2	6 December 1884
An Act to apply the sum of Two million and forty-nine thousand pounds out of the Consolidated Fund to the service of the year ending on the thirty-first day of March one thousand eight hundred and eighty-five. (Repealed by Statute Law Revision Act 1898 (61 & 62 Vict. c. 22))
Representation of the People Act 1884 or the Third Reform Act (repealed)	48 & 49 Vict. c. 3	6 December 1884
An Act to amend the Law relating to the Representation of the People of the United Kingdom. (Repealed by Parliamentary Registration (Ireland) Act 1885 (48 & 49 Vict. c. 17), Statute Law Revision Act 1898 (61 & 62 Vict. c. 22) and Representation of the People Act 1918 (7 & 8 Geo. 5. c. 64))
Yorkshire Registries Amendment Act 1884 (repealed)	48 & 49 Vict. c. 4	6 December 1884
An Act to amend the Forty-third Section of the Yorkshire Registries Act, 1884. (Note: Yorkshire Registries Act 1884 (47 & 48 Vict. c. 54)) (Repealed by Law of Property Act 1969 (c. 59))
Tramways and Public Companies (Ireland) Act 1883, Amendment Act 1884 (repealed)	48 & 49 Vict. c. 5	6 December 1884
An Act to amend Part II of the Tramways and Public Companies (Ireland) Act, 1883. (Note: Tramways and Public Companies (Ireland) Act 1883 (46 & 47 Vict. c. 43)) (Repealed by Statute Law Revision Act (Northern Ireland) 1954 (c. 35 (N.I.)))

=== Sources ===
- "The Public General Statutes, Volume 21: 48 & 49 Victoria – 1884-5". Law Reports, Statutes. 4 August 1867 – via HathiTrust.
- The Public General Acts: 48 & 49 Victoria – 1884-5. Proprietors of the Law Journal Reports – via Internet Archive.

== See also ==
- List of acts of the Parliament of the United Kingdom
