= Prosecution of Offences Act =

Prosecution of Offences Act may refer to:

- Prosecution of Offences Act 1879
- Prosecution of Offences Act 1884
- Prosecution of Offences Act 1908
- Prosecution of Offences Act 1985
