= Public Order Act 1963 =

Act of the Parliament of the United Kingdom

Public Order Act 1963 (Note: Section 2(1).)
- Act of Parliament
- Parliament of the United Kingdom
- Long title: An Act to increase the penalties for offences under section 5 of the Public Order Act 1936 and section 1 of the Public Meeting Act 1908.
- Citation: 1963 c. 52
- Territorial extent: England and Wales; Scotland; (Note: Section 2(2).)

Dates
- Royal assent: 31 July 1963
- Commencement: 31 July 1963 (Note: The Acts of Parliament (Commencement) Act 1793.)
Other legislation
Amends	Public Meeting Act 1908; Public Order Act 1936
Amended by	Criminal Law Act 1977

Status: Amended

Text of statute as originally enacted

Revised text of statute as amended

Text of the Public Order Act 1963 as in force today (including any amendments) within the United Kingdom, from legislation.gov.uk.

The Public Order Act 1963 (c. 52) is an act of the Parliament of the United Kingdom.

== Changes to penalties and mode of trial ==
Section 1(1) increased the penalties to which a person guilty of an offence under section 5 of the Public Order Act 1936 (1 Edw. 8 & 1 Geo. 6. c. 6) (conduct conducive to breach of the peace) or under section 1(1) of the Public Meeting Act 1908 (8 Edw. 7. c. 66) (endeavouring to break up meetings) was liable. It also provided that the offence under the 1936 act was to become triable on indictment. It provided that a person guilty of either of those offences was liable on conviction on indictment, to imprisonment for a term not exceeding twelve months or to a fine not exceeding £500, or to both, or on summary conviction, to imprisonment for a term not exceeding three months or to a fine not exceeding £100, or to both. This did not apply to offences committed before 31 July 1963.

== Consequential amendments ==
Section 1(2) effected consequential amendments to section 7(2) of the Public Order Act 1936 (1 Edw. 8 & 1 Geo. 6. c. 6) and section 1(1) of the Public Meeting Act 1908 (8 Edw. 7. c. 66) which had previously specified the penalty and mode of trial for those two offences.

== See also ==
- Public Order Act
