= List of acts of the Parliament of the United Kingdom from 1908 =

This is a complete list of acts of the Parliament of the United Kingdom for the year 1908.

Note that the first parliament of the United Kingdom was held in 1801; parliaments between 1707 and 1800 were either parliaments of Great Britain or of Ireland). For acts passed up until 1707, see the list of acts of the Parliament of England and the list of acts of the Parliament of Scotland. For acts passed from 1707 to 1800, see the list of acts of the Parliament of Great Britain. See also the list of acts of the Parliament of Ireland.

For acts of the devolved parliaments and assemblies in the United Kingdom, see the list of acts of the Scottish Parliament, the list of acts of the Northern Ireland Assembly, and the list of acts and measures of Senedd Cymru; see also the list of acts of the Parliament of Northern Ireland.

The number shown after each act's title is its chapter number. Acts passed before 1963 are cited using this number, preceded by the year(s) of the reign during which the relevant parliamentary session was held; thus the Union with Ireland Act 1800 is cited as "39 & 40 Geo. 3 c. 67", meaning the 67th act passed during the session that started in the 39th year of the reign of George III and which finished in the 40th year of that reign. Note that the modern convention is to use Arabic numerals in citations (thus "41 Geo. 3" rather than "41 Geo. III"). Acts of the last session of the Parliament of Great Britain and the first session of the Parliament of the United Kingdom are both cited as "41 Geo. 3". Acts passed from 1963 onwards are simply cited by calendar year and chapter number.

== 8 Edw. 7 ==
The third session of the 28th Parliament of the United Kingdom, which met from 29 January 1908 until 21 December 1908.

This session was also traditionally cited as 8 Ed. 7 or 8 E. 7.

=== Public general acts ===
Short title	Citation	Royal assent
Long title
Consolidated Fund (No. 1) Act 1908 (repealed)	8 Edw. 7. c. 1	27 March 1908
An Act to apply certain sums out of the Consolidated Fund to the service of the years ending on the thirty-first day of March one thousand nine hundred and eight and one thousand nine hundred and nine. (Repealed by Statute Law Revision Act 1927 (17 & 18 Geo. 5. c. 42))
Army (Annual) Act 1908 (repealed)	8 Edw. 7. c. 2	14 April 1908
An Act to provide, during Twelve Months, for the Discipline and Regulation of the Army. (Repealed by Statute Law Revision Act 1927 (17 & 18 Geo. 5. c. 42), Army Reserve Act 1950 (14 Geo. 6. c. 32) and Revision of the Army and Air Force Acts (Transitional Provisions) Act 1955 (3 & 4 Eliz. 2. c. 20))
Prosecution of Offences Act 1908 (repealed)	8 Edw. 7. c. 3	18 June 1908
An Act to amend the Prosecution of Offences Acts, 1879 (Note: Prosecution of Offences Act 1879 (42 & 43 Vict. c. 22)) and 1884. (Note: Prosecution of Offences Act 1884 (47 & 48 Vict. c. 58)) (Repealed by Statute Law Revision Act 1927 (17 & 18 Geo. 5. c. 42) and Prosecution of Offences Act 1979 (c. 31))
Patents and Designs Act 1908 (repealed)	8 Edw. 7. c. 4	1 August 1908
An Act to explain section ninety-two of the Patents and Designs Act, 1907. (Note: Patents and Designs Act 1907 (7 Edw. 7. c. 29)) (Repealed by Patents and Designs Act 1919 (9 & 10 Geo. 5. c. 80))
Police (Superannuation) Act 1908 (repealed)	8 Edw. 7. c. 5	1 August 1908
An Act to amend the Law relating to the Superannuation of the Police. (Repealed by Police Pensions Act 1921 (11 & 12 Geo. 5. c. 31))
Public Health Act 1908 (repealed)	8 Edw. 7. c. 6	1 August 1908
An Act to make the provisions of the Public Health Act, 1875, (Note: Public Health Act 1875 (38 & 39 Vict. c. 55)) with respect to the provision and regulation of Markets applicable in rural districts. (Repealed by Food and Drugs Act 1938 (1 & 2 Geo. 6. c. 56))
Fatal Accidents (Damages) Act 1908 (repealed)	8 Edw. 7. c. 7	1 August 1908
An Act to amend the Law with respect to the Assessment of Damages under the Fatal Accidents Acts. (Repealed for England and Wales by Fatal Accidents Act 1959 (7 & 8 Eliz. 2. c. 65) and for Northern Ireland by Fatal Accidents Act (Northern Ireland) 1959 (c. 18 (N.I.)))
Post Office Savings Bank Act 1908 (repealed)	8 Edw. 7. c. 8	1 August 1908
An Act to amend section eleven of the Savings Banks Act, 1904. (Note: Savings Banks Act 1904 (4 Edw. 7. c. 8)) (Repealed by Post Office Savings Bank Act 1954 (2 & 3 Eliz. 2. c. 62))
Isle of Man (Customs) Act 1908 (repealed)	8 Edw. 7. c. 9	1 August 1908
An Act to amend the Law with respect to Customs Duties in the Isle of Man. (Repealed by Isle of Man (Customs) Act 1919 (9 & 10 Geo. 5. c. 74) and Statute Law Revision Act 1927 (17 & 18 Geo. 5. c. 42))
Tobacco Growing (Scotland) Act 1908 (repealed)	8 Edw. 7. c. 10	1 August 1908
An Act to repeal the Law which prohibits the Growing of Tobacco in Scotland. (Repealed by Finance (1909-10) Act 1910 (10 Edw. 7 & 1 Geo. 5. c. 8))
Wild Birds Protection Act 1908 (repealed)	8 Edw. 7. c. 11	1 August 1908
An Act to amend the Wild Birds Protection Acts, 1880 to 1904. (Repealed by Protection of Birds Act 1954 (2 & 3 Eliz. 2. c. 30))
Companies Act 1908 (repealed)	8 Edw. 7. c. 12	1 August 1908
An Act to amend the Law with respect to the holding of Land by Companies incorporated in British Possessions. (Repealed by Companies (Consolidation) Act 1908 (8 Edw. 7. c. 69))
Polling Districts (County Councils) Act 1908 (repealed)	8 Edw. 7. c. 13	1 August 1908
An Act to make further provision with respect to the Arrangement of Polling Districts for the Election of County Councillors. (Repealed for England and Wales by Local Government Act 1933 (23 & 24 Geo. 5. c. 51), for London by London Government Act 1939 (2 & 3 Geo. 6. c. 40), for Scotland by Local Government (Scotland) Act 1947 (10 & 11 Geo. 6. c. 43) and for Northern Ireland by Electoral Law Act (Northern Ireland) 1962 (c. 14 (N.I.)))
Polling Arrangements (Parliamentary Boroughs) Act 1908 (repealed)	8 Edw. 7. c. 14	1 August 1908
An Act to amend the Law relating to the Arrangement of Polling Districts in Parliamentary Boroughs. (Repealed by Representation of the People Act 1918 (7 & 8 Geo. 5. c. 64))
Costs in Criminal Cases Act 1908 (repealed)	8 Edw. 7. c. 15	1 August 1908
An Act to consolidate and amend the Law relating to the Payment of Costs in Criminal Cases. (Repealed by Costs in Criminal Cases Act 1952 (15 & 16 Geo. 6 & 1 Eliz. 2. c. 48))
Finance Act 1908 (repealed)	8 Edw. 7. c. 16	1 August 1908
An Act to grant certain duties of Customs and Inland Revenue, to alter other duties, and to amend the Law relating to Customs and Inland Revenue and the National Debt, and to make other provisions for the financial arrangements of the year. (Repealed by Finance Act 1924 (14 & 15 Geo. 5. c. 21), Statute Law Revision Act 1927 (17 & 18 Geo. 5. c. 42), Customs and Excise Act 1952 (15 & 16 Geo. 6 & 1 Eliz. 2. c. 44), Statute Law Revision Act 1953 (2 & 3 Eliz. 2. c. 5), Finance Act 1960 (c. 44) and Statute Law Revision Act 1964 (c. 79) and for England and Wales by Regulatory Reform (Game) Order 2007 (SI 2007/2007))
Cran Measures Act 1908 (repealed)	8 Edw. 7. c. 17	1 August 1908
An Act to legalise the use of Cran and Quarter Cran Measures in connexion with trading in Fresh Herrings in England and Wales. (Repealed by Weights and Measures Act 1979 (c. 45))
Expiring Laws Continuance Act 1908 (repealed)	8 Edw. 7. c. 18	1 August 1908
An Act to continue various Expiring Laws. (Repealed by Statute Law Revision Act 1927 (17 & 18 Geo. 5. c. 42))
Seed Potatoes and Seed Oats Supply (Ireland) Act 1908 (repealed)	8 Edw. 7. c. 19	1 August 1908
An Act to make provision with respect to Loans and Sales made for the purpose of the supply of Seed Potatoes and Seed Oats to occupiers and cultivators of land in Ireland. (Repealed by Statute Law Revision Act 1927 (17 & 18 Geo. 5. c. 42))
University of Durham Act 1908 or the Durham University Act 1908 (repealed)	8 Edw. 7. c. 20	1 August 1908
An Act to make further provision with respect to the University of Durham. (Repealed by Statute Law Revision Act 1927 (17 & 18 Geo. 5. c. 42) and Universities of Durham and Newcastle upon Tyne Act 1963 (c. xi))
Registration Act 1908 (repealed)	8 Edw. 7. c. 21	1 August 1908
An Act to amend the Law relating to the time for an Appeal from the Decision of a Revising Barrister, and matters consequential thereon. (Repealed by Representation of the People Act 1918 (7 & 8 Geo. 5. c. 64))
Evicted Tenants (Ireland) Act 1908 (repealed)	8 Edw. 7. c. 22	1 August 1908
An Act to amend section one of the Evicted Tenants (Ireland) Act, 1907, (Note: Evicted Tenants (Ireland) Act 1907 (7 Edw. 7. c. 56)) with respect to the compulsory acquisition of tenanted land. (Repealed by Statute Law Revision Act 1927 (17 & 18 Geo. 5. c. 42))
Public Works Loans Act 1908 (repealed)	8 Edw. 7. c. 23	1 August 1908
An Act to grant Money for the purpose of certain Local Loans out of the Local Loans Fund, and for other purposes relating to Local Loans. (Repealed by National Loans Act 1968 (c. 13))
Summary Jurisdiction (Ireland) Act 1908	8 Edw. 7. c. 24	1 August 1908
An Act to amend the Law relating to Drunkenness in Ireland, and for purposes connected therewith.
Naval Lands (Volunteers) Act 1908 (repealed)	8 Edw. 7. c. 25	1 August 1908
An Act to extend the Military Lands Acts to Naval Volunteers. (Repealed by Defence (Transfer of Functions) (No. 1) Order 1964 (SI 1964/488))
Naval Marriages Act 1908 (repealed)	8 Edw. 7. c. 26	1 August 1908
An Act to authorise, for the purpose of Marriages in the United Kingdom, the Publication of Banns and the Issue of Certificates on board His Majesty’s Ships in certain cases. (Repealed for England and Wales by Marriage Act 1949 (12, 13 & 14 Geo. 6. c. 76) and for Scotland by Marriage (Scotland) Act 1977 (c. 15))
Married Women's Property Act 1908 (repealed)	8 Edw. 7. c. 27	1 August 1908
An Act to render Married Women with a separate Estate liable for the support of their Parents. (Repealed by Poor Law Act 1927 (17 & 18 Geo. 5. c. 14))
Agricultural Holdings Act 1908 (repealed)	8 Edw. 7. c. 28	1 August 1908
An Act to consolidate the Enactments relating to Agricultural Holdings in England and Wales. (Repealed by Agricultural Holdings Act 1923 (13 & 14 Geo. 5. c. 9))
Grand Jury (Ireland) Act 1836, Amendment Act 1908 (repealed)	8 Edw. 7. c. 29	1 August 1908
An Act to amend section sixty-seven of the Grand Jury (Ireland) Act, 1836, (Note: Grand Jury (Ireland) Act 1836 (6 & 7 Will. 4. c. 116)) with respect to Piers, Quays, and other Works, and for other purposes connected therewith. (Repealed by Harbours Act (Northern Ireland) 1970 (c. 1 (N.I.)))
Appropriation Act 1908 (repealed)	8 Edw. 7. c. 30	1 August 1908
An Act to apply a sum out of the Consolidated Fund to the service of the year ending on the thirty-first day of March one thousand nine hundred and nine, and to appropriate the Supplies granted in this Session of Parliament. (Repealed by Statute Law Revision Act 1927 (17 & 18 Geo. 5. c. 42))
Whale Fisheries (Ireland) Act 1908	8 Edw. 7. c. 31	1 August 1908
An Act to regulate Whale Fisheries in Ireland.
Friendly Societies Act 1908 (repealed)	8 Edw. 7. c. 32	1 August 1908
An Act to amend the Friendly Societies Act, 1896. (Note: Friendly Societies Act 1896 (59 & 60 Vict. c. 25)) (Repealed by Friendly Societies Act 1974 (c. 46))
Telegraph (Construction) Act 1908 (repealed)	8 Edw. 7. c. 33	1 August 1908
An Act to amend the Telegraph Acts, 1863 to 1907, with respect to the Construction and Maintenance of Telegraphic Lines for telephonic and other telegraphic purposes. (Repealed by Telecommunications Act 1984 (c. 12))
Bee Pest Prevention (Ireland) Act 1908 (repealed)	8 Edw. 7. c. 34	1 August 1908
An Act to prevent the spread of Bee Pest or Foul Brood in Ireland. (Repealed by Bee Pest Prevention Act (Northern Ireland) 1945 (c. 1 (N.I.)))
Polling Districts and Registration of Voters (Ireland) Act 1908 (repealed)	8 Edw. 7. c. 35	1 August 1908
An Act to confer upon County Councils in Ireland the power to alter the Polling Districts and alter the method of compiling Lists of Voters. (Repealed by Representation of the People Act 1918 (7 & 8 Geo. 5. c. 64))
Small Holdings and Allotments Act 1908	8 Edw. 7. c. 36	1 August 1908
An Act to consolidate the enactments with respect to small holdings and allotments in England and Wales.
Coroners (Ireland) Act 1908 (repealed)	8 Edw. 7. c. 37	1 August 1908
An Act to provide for the Appointment of Deputy Coroners in Counties and Boroughs in Ireland. (Repealed by Coroners Act (Northern Ireland) 1959 (c. 15 (N.I.)))
Irish Universities Act 1908 (repealed)	8 Edw. 7. c. 38	1 August 1908
An Act to make further provision with respect to University Education in Ireland. (Repealed by Queen's University of Belfast (Northern Ireland) Order 1981 (SI 1981/610 (N.I. 18)))
Endowed Schools (Masters) Act 1908 (repealed)	8 Edw. 7. c. 39	1 August 1908
An Act to make provision with respect to the tenure of office of Masters of Endowed Schools. (Repealed by Charities Act 1960 (8 & 9 Eliz. 2. c. 58))
Old Age Pensions Act 1908 (repealed)	8 Edw. 7. c. 40	1 August 1908
An Act to provide for Old Age Pensions. (Repealed for England and Wales and Scotland by Old Age Pensions Act 1936 (26 Geo. 5 & 1 Edw. 8. c. 31) and for Northern Ireland by Old Age Pensions Act (Northern Ireland) 1936 (26 Geo. 5 & 1 Edw. 8. c. 31 (N.I.)))
Assizes and Quarter Sessions Act 1908 (repealed)	8 Edw. 7. c. 41	21 December 1908
An Act to dispense with the Attendance of Jurors at Assizes and Quarter Sessions and with the Holding of Assizes and Quarter Sessions in certain cases, and to amend the Law relating to the dates at which Quarter Sessions are to be held. (Repealed by Courts Act 1971 (c. 23))
White Phosphorus Matches Prohibition Act 1908 or the White Phosphorus Prohibition Act 1908 (repealed)	8 Edw. 7. c. 42	21 December 1908
An Act to prohibit the Manufacture, Sale, and Importation of Matches made with White Phosphorus, and for other purposes in connection therewith. (Repealed for England and Wales and Scotland by Factories Act 1937 (1 Edw. 8 & 1 Geo. 6. c. 67) and for Northern Ireland by Statute Law Revision Act 1953 (2 & 3 Eliz. 2. c. 5))
Local Authorities (Admission of the Press to Meetings) Act 1908 (repealed)	8 Edw. 7. c. 43	21 December 1908
An Act to provide for the Admission of Representatives of the Press to the Meetings of certain Local Authorities. (Repealed by Public Bodies (Admission to Meetings) Act 1960 (8 & 9 Eliz. 2. c. 67))
Commons Act 1908	8 Edw. 7. c. 44	21 December 1908
An Act to regulate the turning out upon Commons of Entire Animals.
Punishment of Incest Act 1908	8 Edw. 7. c. 45	21 December 1908
An Act to provide for the punishment of Incest. (Repealed for England and Wales by Sexual Offences Act 1956 (4 & 5 Eliz. 2. c. 69))
Criminal Appeal (Amendment) Act 1908 (repealed)	8 Edw. 7. c. 46	21 December 1908
An Act to amend the Criminal Appeal Act, 1907, (Note: Criminal Appeal Act 1907 (7 Edw. 7. c. 23)) with reference to the Judges of the Court of Criminal Appeal and the Registrar. (Repealed by Criminal Appeal Act 1966 (c. 31))
Lunacy Act 1908 (repealed)	8 Edw. 7. c. 47	21 December 1908
An Act to amend the Lunacy Acts, 1890 (Note: Lunacy Act 1890 (53 & 54 Vict. c. 5)) and 1891. (Note: Lunacy Act 1891 (54 & 55 Vict. c. 65)) (Repealed by Mental Health Act 1959 (7 & 8 Eliz. 2. c. 72))
Post Office Act 1908 (repealed)	8 Edw. 7. c. 48	21 December 1908
An Act to consolidate Enactments relating to the Post Office. (Repealed by Post Office Act 1953 (1 & 2 Eliz. 2. c. 36))
Statute Law Revision Act 1908 (repealed)	8 Edw. 7. c. 49	21 December 1908
An Act for further promoting the Revision of the Statute Law by repealing Enactments which have ceased to be in force or have become unnecessary. (Repealed by Statute Law (Repeals) Act 1998 (c. 43))
Crofters Common Grazings Regulation Act 1908	8 Edw. 7. c. 50	21 December 1908
An Act to extend the powers of the Crofters Commission in regard to the regulation of common grazings.
Appellate Jurisdiction Act 1908	8 Edw. 7. c. 51	21 December 1908
An Act to amend the Law with respect to the Judicial Committee of the Privy Council, and the Court of Appeal in England.
Post Office Savings Bank (Public Trustee) Act 1908 (repealed)	8 Edw. 7. c. 52	21 December 1908
An Act to amend the Post Office Savings Bank Acts, 1861 to 1908, with respect to deposits by the Public Trustee. (Repealed by Savings Banks Act 1929 (19 & 20 Geo. 5. c. 27))
Law of Distress Amendment Act 1908 (repealed)	8 Edw. 7. c. 53	21 December 1908
An Act to amend the Law as regards a Landlord's right of Distress for Rent. (Repealed for England and Wales by Tribunals, Courts and Enforcement Act 2007 (c. 15) and for Northern Ireland by Judgments (Enforcement) Act (Northern Ireland) 1969 (c. 30 (N.I.)))
East India Loans Act 1908 (repealed)	8 Edw. 7. c. 54	21 December 1908
An Act to empower the Secretary of State in Council of India to raise money in the United Kingdom for the Construction, Extension, and Equipment of Railways in India by State Agency, or through the Agency of Companies, for the Construction of Irrigation Works; and for other purposes. (Repealed by East India Loans Act 1937 (1 Edw. 8 & 1 Geo. 6. c. 14))
Poisons and Pharmacy Act 1908 (repealed)	8 Edw. 7. c. 55	21 December 1908
An Act to regulate the sale of certain Poisonous Substances and to amend the Pharmacy Acts. (Repealed for England and Wales and Scotland by Pharmacy Act 1954 (2 & 3 Eliz. 2. c. 61) and for Northern Ireland by Statute Law Revision Act (Northern Ireland) 1954 (c. 35 (N.I.)))
Tuberculosis Prevention (Ireland) Act 1908 (repealed)	8 Edw. 7. c. 56	21 December 1908
An Act to prevent the spread and provide for the treatment of Tuberculosis; and for other purposes connected therewith. (Repealed by Health Services (Amendment) Act (Northern Ireland) 1969 (c. 36 (N.I.)))
Coal Mines Regulation Act 1908 or the Coal Mines (Eight Hours) Act 1908 or the Eight Hours Day Act 1908 or the Eight Hours Act 1908 (repealed)	8 Edw. 7. c. 57	21 December 1908
An Act to amend the Coal Mines Regulation Acts 1887 to 1905, for the purpose of limiting hours of work below ground. (Repealed for England and Wales and Scotland by Coal Industry Act 1992 (c. 17) and for Northern Ireland by Trade Union and Labour Relations (Northern Ireland) Order 1995 (SI 1995/1980 (N.I. 12)))
Local Registration of Title (Ireland) Amendment Act 1908 (repealed)	8 Edw. 7. c. 58	21 December 1908
An Act to amend the Local Registration of Title (Ireland) Act, 1891. (Note: Local Registration of Title (Ireland) Act 1891 (54 & 55 Vict. c. 66)) (Repealed by Statute Law Revision Act 1927 (17 & 18 Geo. 5. c. 42))
Prevention of Crime Act 1908 (repealed)	8 Edw. 7. c. 59	21 December 1908
An Act to make better provision for the prevention of crime, and for that purpose to provide for the reformation of Young Offenders and the prolonged detention of Habitual Criminals, and for other purposes incidental thereto. (Repealed for England and Wales by Criminal Justice Act 1948 (11 & 12 Geo. 6. c. 58), for Scotland by Criminal Justice (Scotland) Act 1949 (12, 13 & 14 Geo. 6. c. 94) and for Northern Ireland by Treatment of Offenders (Northern Ireland) Order 1980 (SI 1980/1084 (N.I. 10)))
Constabulary (Ireland) Act 1908 (repealed)	8 Edw. 7. c. 60	21 December 1908
An Act to amend the Law relating to the Pay and Pensions of the Royal Irish Constabulary, and for other purposes connected therewith. (Repealed by Statute Law Revision Act 1927 (17 & 18 Geo. 5. c. 42))
Housing of the Working Classes (Ireland) Act 1908 or the Clancy Act (repealed)	8 Edw. 7. c. 61	21 December 1908
An Act to provide further facilities for the erection of Houses for the Working Classes in Cities and Towns in Ireland. (Repealed by Judgments Enforcement (Northern Ireland) Order 1981 (SI 1981/226 (N.I. 6)))
Local Government (Scotland) Act 1908 (repealed)	8 Edw. 7. c. 62	21 December 1908
An Act to amend the Law relating to County Government, and to Roads and Bridges and the use of Locomotives thereon, in Scotland. (Repealed by Statute Law (Repeals) Act 1986 (c. 12))
Education (Scotland) Act 1908 (repealed)	8 Edw. 7. c. 63	21 December 1908
An Act to amend the Laws relating to Education in Scotland, and for other purposes connected therewith. (Repealed by Education (Scotland) Act 1918 (8 & 9 Geo. 5. c. 48), Education (Scotland) (Superannuation) Act 1919 (9 & 10 Geo. 5. c. 17), Statute Law Revision Act 1927 (17 & 18 Geo. 5. c. 42), Local Government (Scotland) Act 1929 (19 & 20 Geo. 5. c. 25), Education (Scotland) Act 1936 (26 Geo. 5 & 1 Edw. 8. c. 42), Reorganisation of Offices (Scotland) Act 1939 (2 & 3 Geo. 6. c. 20), Education (Scotland) Act 1942 (5 & 6 Geo. 6. c. 5), Education (Scotland) Act 1945 (8 & 9 Geo. 6. c. 37) and Education (Scotland) Act 1946 (9 & 10 Geo. 6. c. 72))
Agricultural Holdings (Scotland) Act 1908 (repealed)	8 Edw. 7. c. 64	21 December 1908
An Act to consolidate the Enactments relating to Agricultural Holdings in Scotland. (Repealed by Agriculture Act 1920 (10 & 11 Geo. 5. c. 76) and Agricultural Holdings (Scotland) Act 1923 (13 & 14 Geo. 5. c. 10))
Summary Jurisdiction (Scotland) Act 1908 (repealed)	8 Edw. 7. c. 65	21 December 1908
An Act to regulate and amend the Law relating to Summary Jurisdiction and Criminal Procedure in Scotland. (Repealed by Statute Law (Repeals) Act 1977 (c. 18))
Public Meeting Act 1908	8 Edw. 7. c. 66	21 December 1908
An Act to prevent disturbance of Public Meetings. (Repealed for Northern Ireland by Public Order Act (Northern Ireland) 1951 (c. 19 (N.I.)))
Children Act 1908 or the Children's Act 1908 or the Children and Young Persons Act 1908 or the Children's Charter (repealed)	8 Edw. 7. c. 67	21 December 1908
An Act to consolidate and amend the Law relating to the Protection of Children and Young Persons, Reformatory and Industrial Schools, and Juvenile Offenders, and otherwise to amend the Law with respect to Children and Young Persons. (Repealed for England and Wales and Scotland by Children Act 1958 (6 & 7 Eliz. 2. c. 65) and for Northern Ireland by Children and Young Persons Act (Northern Ireland) 1950 (c. 5 (N.I.)))
Port of London Act 1908 (repealed)	8 Edw. 7. c. 68	21 December 1908
An Act to provide for the improvement and better administration of the Port of London, and for purposes incidental thereto. (Repealed by Port of London (Consolidation) Act 1920 (10 & 11 Geo. 5. c. clxxiii) (Note: Incorrectly cited as "c. cclxxiii" in the Chronological Table of the Statutes.) and Port of London Act 1968 (c. xxxii) (Note: Incorrectly cited as "c. cxxxii" in the Chronological Table of the Statutes.))
Companies (Consolidation) Act 1908 (repealed)	8 Edw. 7. c. 69	21 December 1908
An Act to consolidate the Companies Act, 1862, (Note: Companies Act 1862 (25 & 26 Vict. c. 89)) and the Acts amending it. (Repealed for England and Wales and Scotland by Companies Act 1929 (19 & 20 Geo. 5. c. 23) and for Northern Ireland by Companies Act (Northern Ireland) 1932 (22 & 23 Geo. 5. c. 7 (N.I.)) and Company Law Amendment Act (Northern Ireland) 1950 (c. 24 (N.I.)))

=== Local acts ===
Short title	Citation	Royal assent
Long title
Transfer of Training Colleges (Scotland) Order Confirmation Act 1908 (repealed)	8 Edw. 7. c. i	27 March 1908
An Act to confirm a Provisional Order under the Private Legislation Procedure (Scotland) Act 1899 (Note: Private Legislation Procedure (Scotland) Act 1899 (62 & 63 Vict. c. 47)) relating to the Transfer of Training Colleges in Scotland. (Repealed by Statute Law (Repeals) Act 1998 (c. 43))
	Transfer of Training Colleges (Scotland) Order 1908 Provisional Order to enable the body of management of any existing Training College or Colleges in Scotland to demit their powers of management and to transfer such College or Colleges and for other purposes.	
Clyde Navigation (Superannuation) Order Confirmation Act 1908 (repealed)	8 Edw. 7. c. ii	27 March 1908
An Act to confirm a Provisional Order under the Private Legislation Procedure (Scotland) Act 1899 relating to the Clyde Navigation. (Repealed by Statute Law (Repeals) Act 1989 (c. 43))
	Clyde Navigation (Superannuation) Order 1908	
Madras Railway Annuities Act 1908 (repealed)	8 Edw. 7. c. iii	27 March 1908
An Act to provide for the creation and management of the Madras Railway Annuities and for other purposes. (Repealed by Statute Law (Repeals) Act 2013 (c. 2))
Herne Bay Pier Act 1908	8 Edw. 7. c. iv	14 April 1908
An Act to authorise the sale of Herne Bay Pier and for other purposes.
Great Western Railway (Superannuation Scheme) Act 1908 (repealed)	8 Edw. 7. c. v	18 June 1908
An Act to provide for a superannuation scheme for officers and servants of the Great Western Railway Company in substitution for the Great Western Railway Superannuation Fund established under the provisions of the Great Western Railway Act 1864. (Note: Great Western Railway Act 1864 (27 & 28 Vict. c. cccvi)) (Repealed by Great Western Railway (Superannuation Fund) Act 1941 (4 & 5 Geo. 6. c. ii))
Dublin and South Eastern Railway Act 1908	8 Edw. 7. c. vi	18 June 1908
An Act to confer further powers on the Dublin and South Eastern Railway Company in relation to their general undertaking and their separate undertakings of the New Ross and Waterford Extension Railways and the City of Dublin Junction Railways and for other purposes.
Glasgow Corporation Act 1908 (repealed)	8 Edw. 7. c. vii	18 June 1908
An Act to amend the Glasgow Building Regulations Act 1900. (Note: Glasgow Building Regulations Act 1900 (63 & 64 Vict. c. cl)) (Repealed by Glasgow Streets, Sewers and Buildings Consolidation Order Confirmation Act 1937 (1 Edw. 8 & 1 Geo. 6. c. xliii))
Huddersfield Water Act 1908	8 Edw. 7. c. viii	18 June 1908
An Act to make further provision with respect to the discharge of compensation waters from the water undertaking of the mayor aldermen and burgesses of the county borough of Huddersfield.
Derby Gas Act 1908	8 Edw. 7. c. ix	18 June 1908
An Act for conferring further powers upon the Derby Gas Light and Coke Company.
Interoceanic Railway of Mexico (Acapulco to Vera Crus) Limited Act 1908	8 Edw. 7. c. x	18 June 1908
An Act to make provision for dealing with the arrears of dividend on the preferred shares of the Interoceanic Railway of Mexico (Acapulco to Vera Cruz) Limited and for the increase and re-arrangement of the capital of the Company and for other purposes.
Norwich Union Fire Insurance Society Limited Act 1908	8 Edw. 7. c. xi	18 June 1908
An Act to make provision with reference to the registration under the Companies Acts 1862 to 1907 of the Norwich Union Fire Insurance Society as a limited company and the alteration of its constitution the extension of its objects and business and the subdivision of its shares by substituting a memorandum and articles of association for its deed of settlement and existing laws and regulations and for the repeal of the Norwich Union Fire Insurance Society's Act 1879 (Note: Norwich Union Fire Insurance Society's Act 1879 (42 & 43 Vict. c. xx)) and for other purposes.
Rhymney Railway Act 1908	8 Edw. 7. c. xii	18 June 1908
An Act to authorise the Rhymney Railway Company to reconstruct their Cardiff Passenger Station to make a new railway to raise additional capital and for other purposes.
Knott End Railway Act 1908	8 Edw. 7. c. xiii	18 June 1908
An Act to extend the period for the completion of the railway authorised by the Knott End Railway Act 1898 (Note: Knott End Railway Act 1898 (61 & 62 Vict. c. ccxliv)) to provide for the acquisition by the Knott End Railway Company of the undertaking of the Garstang and Knot End Railway Company and for other purposes.
Dartford Gas Act 1908 (repealed)	8 Edw. 7. c. xiv	18 June 1908
An Act for conferring further powers upon the Dartford Gas Company and for other purposes. (Repealed by South Suburban Gas Act 1928 (18 & 19 Geo. 5. c. lxxx))
Great Eastern Railway (General Powers) Act 1908	8 Edw. 7. c. xv	18 June 1908
An Act for conferring further powers upon the Great Eastern Railway Company for extending the time limited by former Acts for the completion of works and the purchase of lands and for other purposes.
Dundalk Urban District Council Act 1908	8 Edw. 7. c. xvi	18 June 1908
An Act to amend the borrowing powers of the urban district council of Dundalk and for other purposes.
Fishguard and Rosslare Railways and Harbours Act 1908	8 Edw. 7. c. xvii	18 June 1908
An Act to empower the Fishguard and Rosslare Railways and Harbours Company to construct Harbour Works at Fishguard in substitution for certain authorised Harbour Works and Railways in connection therewith and for other purposes.
Argentine North Eastern Railway Company Limited Act 1908	8 Edw. 7. c. xviii	18 June 1908
An Act to increase and regulate the Capital of the Argentine North Eastern Railway Company Limited and to fund the arrears of dividend on its preferred stock by the issue of fully paid stock and for other purposes.
Camberwell and other Metropolitan Borough Councils (Superannuation) Act 1908	8 Edw. 7. c. xix	18 June 1908
An Act to provide for the granting of superannuation allowances to the officers and servants of the Councils of the metropolitan boroughs of Camberwell Deptford and Hackney and for other purposes.
Rochdale Corporation Act 1908	8 Edw. 7. c. xx	18 June 1908
An Act to confer further powers upon the mayor aldermen and burgesses of the borough of Rochdale with reference to their water tramway and electrical undertakings to authorise the construction of a new street and for other purposes.
Saint Marylebone Borough Council (Superannuation) Act 1908 (repealed)	8 Edw. 7. c. xxi	18 June 1908
An Act to provide for the granting of superannuation allowances to the officers and servants of the Council of the metropolitan borough of Saint Marylebone and for other purposes. (Repealed by London Authorities (Superannuation) (Amendment) Order 1967 (SI 1967/1330))
Skegness Urban District Council Act 1908	8 Edw. 7. c. xxii	18 June 1908
An Act to authorise the urban district council of Skegness to purchase the undertaking of the Skegness Water Company and to make further and better provisions in regard to the health local government and improvement of the district and for other purposes.
Cheshire Lines Act 1908	8 Edw. 7. c. xxiii	18 June 1908
An Act to enable the Cheshire Lines Committee to acquire additional lands to extend the time for the sale of superfluous lands and for other purposes.
Llanelly Gas Act 1908	8 Edw. 7. c. xxiv	18 June 1908
An Act to authorise the Llanelly Gaslight Company to raise additional capital and for other purposes.
Great Western Railway Act 1908	8 Edw. 7. c. xxv	18 June 1908
An Act for extending and varying the powers of the Great Western Railway Company in respect of certain authorised railways and works and for other purposes.
Hull and Barnsley Railway Act 1908	8 Edw. 7. c. xxvi	18 June 1908
An Act to extend the time for the purchase of lands for and for the completion of certain works authorised by the Hull Barnsley and West Riding Junction Railway and Dock (South Yorkshire Extension Lines) Act 1902 (Note: Hull, Barnsley and West Riding Junction Railway and Dock (South Yorkshire Extension Lines) Act 1902 (2 Edw. 7. c. ccxvii)) to authorise the Hull and Barnsley Railway Company to construct new railways and for other purposes
Edinburgh Corporation (Tramways, &c.) Order Confirmation Act 1908 (repealed)	8 Edw. 7. c. xxvii	18 June 1908
An Act to confirm a Provisional Order under the Private Legislation Procedure (Scotland) Act 1899 relating to Edinburgh Corporation (Tramways &c.). (Repealed by Edinburgh Corporation Order Confirmation Act 1933 (24 & 25 Geo. 5. c. v))
	Edinburgh Corporation (Tramways, &c.) Order 1908 Provisional Order to authorise the Lord Provost Magistrates and Council of the City and Royal Burgh of Edinburgh to make and maintain a tramway to make contributions to reformatories or industrial schools to amend and extend the provisions of the Edinburgh Municipal and Police Acts and for other purposes.	
Loch Leven Water Power Order Confirmation Act 1908	8 Edw. 7. c. xxviii	18 June 1908
An Act to confirm a Provisional Order under the Private Legislation Procedure (Scotland) Act 1899 relating to Loch Leven Water Power.
	Loch Leven Water Power Order 1908 Provisional Order to extend the time limited by the Loch Leven Water Power (Amendment) Act 1904 (Note: Loch Leven Water Power (Amendment) Act 1904 (4 Edw. 7. c. ccxli)) for the construction of Work No. 5 authorised by the Loch Leven Water Power Act 1901 (Note: Loch Leven Water Power Act 1901 (1 Edw. 7. c. cclxx)) to authorise the levying of rates at Kinlochleven Pier for the maintenance and regulation of the said pier and for other purposes.	
Tramways Order Confirmation (No. 1) Act 1908	8 Edw. 7. c. xxix	18 June 1908
An Act to confirm a Provisional Order made by the Board of Trade under the Tramways Act 1870 (Note: Tramways Act 1870 (33 & 34 Vict. c. 78)) relating to Manchester Corporation Tramways.
	Manchester Corporation Tramways Order 1908 Order authorising the Lord Mayor Aldermen and Citizens of the City of Manchester to construct additional Tramways in their City.	
Leith Harbour and Docks Order Confirmation Act 1908	8 Edw. 7. c. xxx	18 June 1908
An Act to confirm a Provisional Order under the Private Legislation Procedure (Scotland) Act 1899 relating to Leith Harbour and Docks.
	Leith Harbour and Docks Order 1908 Provisional Order to authorise the Commissioners for the harbour and docks of Leith to construct a graving dock and other works to alter the procedure for electing Commissioners to vary the method of charging rates &c. to authorise the Commissioners to borrow money and to define their borrowing powers to amend the Leith Harbour and Docks Acts 1875 (Note: Leith Harbour and Docks Act 1875 (38 & 39 Vict. c. clx)) 1892 (Note: Leith Harbour and Docks Act 1892 (55 & 56 Vict. c. clxxvii)) and 1899 (Note: Leith Harbour and Docks Act 1899 (62 & 63 Vict. c. cliv)) and for other purposes.	
Metropolitan Police Provisional Order Confirmation Act 1908 (repealed)	8 Edw. 7. c. xxxi	18 June 1908
An Act to confirm a Provisional Order made by one of His Majesty's Principal Secretaries of State under the Metropolitan Police Act 1886 (Note: Metropolitan Police Act 1886 (49 & 50 Vict. c. 22)) and the Metropolitan Police Courts Act 1897. (Note: Metropolitan Police Courts Act 1897 (60 & 61 Vict. c. 26)) (Repealed by Statute Law (Repeals) Act 2008 (c. 12))
	Order made by the Secretary of State under the Metropolitan Police Act 1886 and the Metropolitan Police Courts Act 1897.	
Conway and Colwyn Bay Joint Water Supply Board Act 1908	8 Edw. 7. c. xxxii	1 August 1908
An Act to confirm the construction by the Conway and Colwyn Bay Joint Water Supply Board of their existing works and to confer upon them further powers and for other purposes.
Lincoln Corporation (Water, &c.) Act 1908	8 Edw. 7. c. xxxiii	1 August 1908
An Act to confer further powers upon the Corporation of the City of Lincoln with respect to their water undertaking and to authorise the Corporation to construct additional waterworks and to extend their limits for the supply of water to consolidate the loans and sinking funds of the Corporation and to borrow money and for other purposes.
North Eastern Railway Act 1908	8 Edw. 7. c. xxxiv	1 August 1908
An Act to confer additional powers upon the North Eastern Railway Company for the construction of new railways and other works and the acquisition of lands and upon the Midland and North Eastern Railway Companies Committee for the acquisition of lands to provide for the transfer to the South Yorkshire Joint Line Committee of certain powers of the Hull and Barnsley Railway Company and for other purposes.
North East London Railway Act 1908 (repealed)	8 Edw. 7. c. xxxv	1 August 1908
An Act for conferring further powers upon the North East London Railway Company. (Repealed by Statute Law (Repeals) Act 2013 (c. 2))
Bury and District Joint Water Board Act 1908	8 Edw. 7. c. xxxvi	1 August 1908
An Act to extend the time for the compulsory purchase of lands for and completion of works authorised by the Bury and District Joint Water Board Act 1903. (Note: Bury and District Joint Water Board Act 1903 (3 Edw. 7. c. ccxxxiv))
Draycott Gas Act 1908	8 Edw. 7. c. xxxvii	1 August 1908
An Act to confer further powers upon the Draycott 'Gas Company to repeal certain powers of the Long Eaton Gas Company and for other purposes.
Cardiff Railway Act 1908	8 Edw. 7. c. xxxviii	1 August 1908
An Act for empowering the Cardiff Railway Company to construct new railways for extending the time for the purchase of certain lands and for the completion of certain railways for reviving the powers of the Company to construct certain works for confirming an agreement between the Caerphilly Urban District Council and the Company and for other purposes.
King's College London (Transfer) Act 1908	8 Edw. 7. c. xxxix	1 August 1908
An Act for transferring to the University of London the powers and duties of King's College London in relation to instruction of a university standard in subjects comprised within the faculties in the university other than the faculty of theology and for other matters connected therewith.
Audenshaw Urban District Council Act 1908	8 Edw. 7. c. xl	1 August 1908
An Act to alter the constitution of the Ashton-under-Lyne Stalybridge and Dukinfield (District) Waterworks Joint Committee and to make the Audenshaw Urban District Council a combining authority and to make further and better provision with regard to the improvement health local government and finance of the urban district of Audenshaw and for other purposes.
Tawe Valley Gas Act 1908	8 Edw. 7. c. xli	1 August 1908
An Act for incorporating and conferring powers on the Tawe Valley Gas Company and for other purposes.
Bristol Tramways Act 1908	8 Edw. 7. c. xlii	1 August 1908
An Act to extend the time for the construction of certain authorised tramways of the Bristol Tramways and Carriage Company Limited and for the acquisition of lands in connexion therewith and for other purposes.
Cambrian Railways (Debenture Stock) Act 1908	8 Edw. 7. c. xliii	1 August 1908
An Act for enabling the Cambrian Railways Company to raise further money by the creation and issue of debenture stock.
North British and Mercantile Insurance Company's Act 1908	8 Edw. 7. c. xliv	1 August 1908
An Act to provide for the transfer of the undertaking of the Ocean Marine Insurance Company Limited to the North British and Mercantile Insurance Company to increase the capital of and to amend the Acts relating to the latter Company and for other purpose.
Upton Town Hall Act 1908	8 Edw. 7. c. xlv	1 August 1908
An Act to provide for the sale of the property of the Upton-upon-Severn Town Hall Trustees and for other purposes.
Blaydon and Ryton Water (Transfer) Act 1908	8 Edw. 7. c. xlvi	1 August 1908
An Act to authorise the sale of the water undertakings of the Blaydon Urban District Council and the Ryton Urban District Council to confer powers upon the Weardale and Consett Water Company and the Newcastle and Gateshead Water Company and for other purposes.
Bromley and Crays Gas Act 1908 (repealed)	8 Edw. 7. c. xlvii	1 August 1908
An Act to provide for the amalgamation of the Crays Gas Company with the Bromley Gas Consumers Company and for other purposes. (Repealed by South Suburban Gas Act 1928 (18 & 19 Geo. 5. c. lxxx))
Stockport Corporation Act 1908	8 Edw. 7. c. xlviii	1 August 1908
An Act to empower the Corporation of Stockport to construct a temporary tramroad and other works in connection with their waterworks and for other purposes.
Humber Commercial Railway and Dock Act 1908	8 Edw. 7. c. xlix	1 August 1908
An Act to authorise the Humber Commercial Railway and Dock Company to acquire additional lands and to make road works for the purposes of their dock at Immingham to authorise the said Dock Company and the Great Central Railway Company to acquire additional lands for the purpose of forming junctions between the Dock Company's railways and the Grimsby District Light Railway and for other purposes.
Southwell District Gas Act 1908	8 Edw. 7. c. l	1 August 1908
An Act to incorporate and confer powers on the Southwell District Gas Company and for other purposes.
Louth and East Coast Railway (Transfer) Act 1908	8 Edw. 7. c. li	1 August 1908
An Act for transferring to and Vesting in the Great Northern Railway Company the undertaking of the Louth and East Coast Railway Company and for other purposes.
Seaham Harbour Dock Act 1908	8 Edw. 7. c. lii	1 August 1908
An Act to enable the Seaham Harbour Dock Company, to raise additional capital and for other purposes.
Camborne Water Act 1908	8 Edw. 7. c. liii	1 August 1908
An Act to confer further powers on the Camborne Water Company for the raising of capital and for other purposes.
Briton Ferry Urban District Council Act 1908 (repealed)	8 Edw. 7. c. liv	1 August 1908
An Act to extend the water limits of the urban district council of Briton Ferry and to enlarge their powers in various respects and for other purposes. (Repealed by West Glamorgan Water Board Order 1966 (SI 1966/1096))
Bristol Corporation Act 1908	8 Edw. 7. c. lv	1 August 1908
An Act to empower the lord mayor aldermen and burgesses of the city of Bristol to construct dock railways and for other purposes.
Leicester Corporation Act 1908 (repealed)	8 Edw. 7. c. lvi	1 August 1908
An Act to extend the limits for the supply of gas and water by the mayor aldermen and burgesses of the county borough of Leicester and to confer further powers with respect to electricity milk supply and streets and buildings and to make further provision with respect to sanitary matters and for the good government of the borough and for other purposes. (Repealed by Leicestershire Act 1985 (c. xvii))
Rochester Bridge Act 1908	8 Edw. 7. c. lvii	1 August 1908
An Act to make better provisions for the constitution of the Court of Wardens and Assistants of Rochester Bridge in the county of Kent to empower the Court, to contribute to the funds of the New College of Cobham in the same county and for other purposes.
Doncaster Corporation Act 1908	8 Edw. 7. c. lviii	1 August 1908
An Act to empower the mayor aldermen and burgesses of the borough of Doncaster to construct a new road a light railway and other works within the borough and for other purposes.
Motherwell Burgh Extension and Sewage Purification Act 1908	8 Edw. 7. c. lix	1 August 1908
An Act to extend the boundaries of the burgh of Motherwell to authorise the provost magistrates and councillors of the said burgh to construct and maintain sewers and sewage purification works to acquire lands for sewage purification and for other purposes.
Swinton and Mexborough Gas Act 1908 (repealed)	8 Edw. 7. c. lx	1 August 1908
An Act to incorporate and confer powers upon the Swinton and Mexbrough Gas Light Company. (Repealed by Statute Law (Repeals) Act 1989 (c. 43))
Merthyr Tydfil Corporation Act 1908 (repealed)	8 Edw. 7. c. lxi	1 August 1908
An Act to empower the corporation of Merthyr Tydfil to construct street works and to provide recreation grounds and to make further and better provision with regard to the health improvement and good government of the borough and for other purposes. (Repealed by Mid Glamorgan County Council Act 1987 (c. vii))
Garw and Ogmore Gas Act 1908	8 Edw. 7. c. lxii	1 August 1908
An Act for conferring further powers upon the Garw and Ogmore Gras Company.
Barry Railway Act 1908	8 Edw. 7. c. lxiii	1 August 1908
An Act to enable the Barry Railway Company to construct new railways and for other purposes.
Metropolitan District Railway Act 1908	8 Edw. 7. c. lxiv	1 August 1908
An Act for making further provision respecting the capital and undertaking of the Metropolitan District Railway Company to authorise the abandonment of works authorised by the Metropolitan District Railway Acts 1897 (Note: Metropolitan District Railway Act 1897 (60 & 61 Vict. c. ccxlvii)) and 1903 (Note: Metropolitan District Railway Act 1903 (3 Edw. 7. c. cxxvi)) and for other purposes
Taff Vale Railway Act 1908	8 Edw. 7. c. lxv	1 August 1908
An Act to confer further powers upon the Taff Vale Railway Company with respect to their Penarth harbour and dock undertaking and for other purposes.
Northern Assurance Act 1908	8 Edw. 7. c. lxvi	1 August 1908
An Act to provide for the substitution of a memorandum and articles of association for the provisions of the Northern Assurance Acts 1865 (Note: Northern Assurance Act 1865 (28 & 29 Vict. c. cxxiii)) 1874 (Note: Northern Assurance Act 1874 (37 & 38 Vict. c. ix)) 1889 (Note: Northern Assurance Act 1889 (52 & 53 Vict. c. xxxv)) and 1899 (Note: Northern Assurance Act 1899 (62 & 63 Vict. c. xvi)) for the registration of the Northern Assurance Company under the Companies Acts 1862 to 1907 as a company limited by shares and for other purposes.
Commercial Union Assurance Company Limited Act 1908	8 Edw. 7. c. lxvii	1 August 1908
An Act to make provision with reference to the substitution of a memorandum and articles of association for the existing constitution and regulations of the Commercial Union Assurance Company Limited and for extending its objects and to repeal the Commercial Union Assurance Company Limited Act 1886 (Note: Commercial Union Assurance Company Act 1886 (49 & 50 Vict. c. lxxv)) the Commercial Union Assurance Company Limited Act 1890 (Note: Commercial Union Assurance Company Act 1890 (53 & 54 Vict. c. clxxii)) and the Commercial Union Assurance Company Limited Act 1900 (Note: Commercial Union Assurance Company Act 1900 (63 & 64 Vict. c. lxxii)) and for other purposes.
Leeds Corporation Act 1908 (repealed)	8 Edw. 7. c. lxviii	1 August 1908
An Act to empower the Corporation of Leeds to acquire lands and construct works for the disposal of sewage and to lay down tramways and for other purposes. (Repealed by West Yorkshire Act 1980 (c. xiv))
Pontypridd Waterworks and Tramroad Act 1908	8 Edw. 7. c. lxix	1 August 1908
An Act to confer further powers upon the Pontypridd Waterworks Company and for other purposes.
Bognor Gaslight and Coke Company Act 1908	8 Edw. 7. c. lxx	1 August 1908
An Act for the dissolution and re-incorporation of the Bognor Gaslight and Coke Company Limited and for other purposes.
South Wales Electrical Power Distribution Company Act 1908	8 Edw. 7. c. lxxi	1 August 1908
An Act to make further provision in regard to the undertaking of the South Wales Electrical Power Distribution Company.
Aire and Calder Navigation Act 1908	8 Edw. 7. c. lxxii	1 August 1908
An Act to authorise the Undertakers of the Aire and Calder Navigation to construct works and acquire lands in connection with their undertaking to amend the Acts relating to the Undertakers to confer further powers upon them and for other purposes.
Glyncorrwg Urban District Council Act 1908	8 Edw. 7. c. lxxiii	1 August 1908
An Act to empower the Glyncorrwg Urban District Council to construct sewerage works and new roads and for other purposes.
Wishaw Burgh Electricity, &c. Act 1908	8 Edw. 7. c. lxxiv	1 August 1908
An Act to confer further powers on the provost magistrates and councillors of the burgh of Wishaw in connexion with their electricity undertaking to authorise the laying of mains and pipes in connexion with the supply of gas beyond the burgh and for other purposes.
Wolverhampton Corporation Act 1908 (repealed)	8 Edw. 7. c. lxxv	1 August 1908
An Act to extend the time for the construction of tramways by the Corporation of Wolverhampton and to make further provision in regard to the tramway and water undertakings of the Corporation and the health local government and improvement of their borough and for other purposes. (Repealed by Wolverhampton Corporation Act 1969 (c. lx))
Finchley Urban District Council Act 1908 (repealed)	8 Edw. 7. c. lxxvi	1 August 1908
An Act to confer further powers on the Urban District Council of Finchley in relation to their electricity undertaking and to make further and better provision with regard to the improvement health local government and finance of the district and for other purposes. (Repealed by Local Law (North West London Boroughs) Order 1965 (SI 1965/533))
Stratford-upon-Avon and Midland Junction Railway (Amalgamation) Act 1908	8 Edw. 7. c. lxxvii	1 August 1908
An Act for amalgamating the Undertakings of the Stratford-upon-Avon Towcester and Midland Junction Railway Company the Evesham Redditch and Stratford-upon-Avon Junction Railway Company and the East and West Junction Railway Company and for other purposes.
London County Council (Tramways and Improvements) Act 1908	8 Edw. 7. c. lxxviii	1 August 1908
An Act to empower the London County Council to construct and work tramways and make a new street and street improvements and other works in the county of London and for other purposes.
London County Council (Money) Act 1908 (repealed)	8 Edw. 7. c. lxxix	1 August 1908
An Act to regulate the expenditure of money by the London County Council on capital account during the current financial period and the raising of money to meet such expenditure and for other purposes. (Repealed by London County Council (Finance Consolidation) Act 1912 (2 & 3 Geo. 5. c. cv))
Macclesfield and District Tramways (Abandonment) Act 1908 (repealed)	8 Edw. 7. c. lxxx	1 August 1908
An Act for the abandonment of a portion of the Macclesfield and District Tramways and for other purposes. (Repealed by Cheshire County Council Act 1980 (c. xiii))
Honourable Artillery Company Act 1908	8 Edw. 7. c. lxxxi	1 August 1908
An Act to appoint Special Trustees in regard to certain land and premises of the Honourable Artillery Company and for other purposes.
Leith Burgh Act 1908 (repealed)	8 Edw. 7. c. lxxxii	1 August 1908
An Act to authorise the provost magistrates and councillors of the burgh of Leith to construct additional tramways and to execute street improvements and for other purposes. (Repealed by Edinburgh Corporation Order Confirmation Act 1932 (22 & 23 Geo. 5. c. vii))
London Brighton and South Coast Railway Act 1908	8 Edw. 7. c. lxxxiii	1 August 1908
An Act to extend the time for the completion of certain works by the London Brighton and South Coast Railway Company to authorise certain street works in the borough of Worthing and to confer certain powers upon the corporation of Worthing with reference thereto and for other purposes.
Liverpool Corporation (General Powers) Act 1908 (repealed)	8 Edw. 7. c. lxxxiv	1 August 1908
An Act for empowering the Corporation of the city of Liverpool to execute a widening of Hornby Road to construct a tramway in the township of Litherland and to establish a compensation insurance fund in respect of their officers servants and workmen for making further provisions relating to the water undertaking of the Corporation for making further regulations with respect to buildings sewers and sanitary matters for making certain licensing and registration regulations for authorising the Corporation to purchase the undertaking of the Liverpool Crematorium Company Limited and for other purposes. (Repealed by County of Merseyside Act 1980 (c. x))
Tyne Improvement Act 1908	8 Edw. 7. c. lxxxv	1 August 1908
An Act for conferring further powers on the Tyne Improvement Commissioners in reference to dredging.
Widnes Corporation Act 1908	8 Edw. 7. c. lxxxvi	1 August 1908
An Act to confer further powers upon the Corporation of Widnes in relation to their water gas and market undertakings and the Widnes and Runcorn Bridge undertaking to authorise them to provide and work omnibuses and to make further and better provision for the health improvement and good government of the borough of Widnes and for other purposes.
Margate Corporation Act 1908 (repealed)	8 Edw. 7. c. lxxxvii	1 August 1908
An Act to confer further powers upon the mayor aldermen and burgesses of the borough of Margate with regard to the audit of accounts and to make further provision with regard to the health local government and improvement of the borough and for other purposes. (Repealed by County of Kent Act 1981 (c. xviii))
Manchester Corporation Act 1908	8 Edw. 7. c. lxxxviii	1 August 1908
An Act to confer further powers upon the lord mayor aldermen and citizens of the city of Manchester with reference to the construction of waterworks street works and sewerage works and otherwise for the better local government and improvement of the city and for other purposes.
Burnley Corporation Act 1908	8 Edw. 7. c. lxxxix	1 August 1908
An Act to authorise the corporation of Burnley to construct additional waterworks tramways and street improvements to amend and extend the Acts relating to the borough to confer further powers with respect to the supply of gas water and electricity to make further provisions for the health local government and improvement of the said borough and for other purposes.
Ammanford Urban District Council (Water) Act 1908	8 Edw. 7. c. xc	1 August 1908
An Act to sanction and confirm the existing water undertaking of the urban district council of Ammanford in the county of Carmarthen and for other purposes.
Metropolitan Electric Tramways Act 1908	8 Edw. 7. c. xci	1 August 1908
An Act to empower the Metropolitan Electric Tramways Limited to construct a new tramway and widen certain streets and roads and for other purposes.
Rhymney and Aber Valleys Gas and Water Act 1908	8 Edw. 7. c. xcii	1 August 1908
An Act for conferring further powers on the Rhymney and Aber Valleys Gas and Water Company.
Wath and Bolton Gas Board Act 1908	8 Edw. 7. c. xciii	1 August 1908
An Act to constitute and incorporate a Gas Board for the urban districts of Wath-upon-Dearne and Bolton-upon-Dearne in the west riding of the county of York and to transfer to and vest in such Board the undertaking of the Wath-upon-Dearne and District Gas Company Limited and for other purposes.
South West Suburban Water Act 1908	8 Edw. 7. c. xciv	1 August 1908
An Act to empower the South West Suburban Water Company to raise additional capital and for other purposes.
Blackburn Corporation Act 1908	8 Edw. 7. c. xcv	1 August 1908
An Act to authorise the corporation of the county borough of Blackburn to construct new tramways in the borough to make street and bridge improvements to borrow money and for other purposes.
Keighley Corporation Act 1908 (repealed)	8 Edw. 7. c. xcvi	1 August 1908
An Act to empower the mayor aldermen and burgesses of the borough of Keighley to purchase further lands in connection with their water undertaking to extend the time for the construction of certain waterworks to empower the Corporation to provide and work motor omnibuses and to extend the powers of the Corporation with regard to their gas and electricity undertakings and with regard to the health local government and improvement of the borough and for other purposes. (Repealed by West Yorkshire Act 1980 (c. xiv))
Great Northern, Piccadilly and Brompton Railway Act 1908	8 Edw. 7. c. xcvii	1 August 1908
An Act to confer on the Great Northern Piccadilly and Brampton Railway Company further Powers with reference to capital and for other purposes.
Thames River Steamboat Service Act (1904) Amendment Act 1908	8 Edw. 7. c. xcviii	1 August 1908
An Act to amend the Thames River Steamboat Service Act 1904 (Note: Thames River Steamboat Service Act 1904 (4 Edw. 7. c. cciii)) with respect to the tolls rates and charges at the piers and landing-places of the London County Council on the River Thames and for other purposes.
Holderness Water Act 1908	8 Edw. 7. c. xcix	1 August 1908
An Act to incorporate and confer powers upon the Holderness Water Company for supplying water within the borough of Hedon and adjacent places in the east riding of the county of York.
London United Tramways Act 1908	8 Edw. 7. c. c	1 August 1908
An Act for conferring further powers on the London United Tramways Limited for constructing tramways and widening and altering streets and roads and for other purposes.
Nottinghamshire and Derbyshire Tramways Act 1908	8 Edw. 7. c. ci	1 August 1908
An Act to further extend the time limited for the purchase of lands and for the construction and completion of the tramways and works authorised by the Nottinghamshire and Derbyshire Tramways Act 1903 (Note: Nottinghamshire and Derbyshire Tramways Act 1903 (3 Edw. 7. c. ccii)) to provide for the transfer to the corporation of Nottingham of certain of the powers of that Act to authorise the corporation to construct additional tramways and a tramroad and street improvements and for other purposes.
Sligo and Arigna Railway Act 1908	8 Edw. 7. c. cii	1 August 1908
An Act to incorporate the Sligo and Arigna Railway Company and to empower them to construct a railway in the counties of Sligo and Roscommon and for other purposes.
Criccieth Water and Improvement Act 1908	8 Edw. 7. c. ciii	1 August 1908
An Act to authorise the urban district council of Cricciefh to supply water and to acquire the undertaking of the Criccieth Waterworks Company Limited and to make further provision in regard to the local government and improvement of the district and for other purposes.
Padiham Urban District Council Act 1908	8 Edw. 7. c. civ	1 August 1908
An Act to confer further powers upon the Padiham Urban District Council in relation to their gas and water undertakings and for other purposes.
Central Ireland Electric Power Act 1908	8 Edw. 7. c. cv	1 August 1908
An Act for incorporating and conferring powers on the Central Ireland Electric Power Company and for other purposes.
Gosport Gas Act 1908	8 Edw. 7. c. cvi	1 August 1908
An Act to confer further powers upon the Gosport Gas and Coke Company.
London County Council (General Powers) Act 1908	8 Edw. 7. c. cvii	1 August 1908
An Act to make sanitary provisions applicable to the administrative county of London to amend the London Building Act 1894 (Note: London Building Act 1894 (57 & 58 Vict. c. ccxiii)) to confer powers upon the London County Council and the councils of certain metropolitan boroughs to make provisions with respect to the drainage of parts of the metropolitan borough of Hackney and the urban districts of Tottenham and Willesden and for other purposes.
Ravensthorpe Urban District Council Act 1908 (repealed)	8 Edw. 7. c. cviii	1 August 1908
An Act to confer further powers on the Ravensthorpe Urban District Council in regard to their water and electricity undertakings and generally to improve the local government of the district. (Repealed by West Yorkshire Act 1980 (c. xiv))
Crystal Palace Company's Act 1908 (repealed)	8 Edw. 7. c. cix	1 August 1908
An Act for making further provision respecting the undertaking and debenture stock o£ the Crystal Palace Company and for other purposes. (Repealed by London County Council (Crystal Palace) Act 1951 (14 & 15 Geo. 6. c. xxviii))
River Wandle Protection Act 1908	8 Edw. 7. c. cx	1 August 1908
An Act for the preservation of the underground sources of the River Wandle.
Dover Graving Dock Act 1908 (repealed)	8 Edw. 7. c. cxi	1 August 1908
An Act to authorise the construction and maintenance of graving dock and quays and other works in connexion therewith at Dover in the county of Kent. (Repealed by Dover Harbour Act 1953 (1 & 2 Eliz. 2. c. xxix))
Public Offices Sites (Extension) Act 1908	8 Edw. 7. c. cxii	1 August 1908
An Act to provide for the acquisition of Land for the extension of certain Public Offices in Westminster and of the Patent Office and for certain other public purposes.
Ayr Corporation Tramways Order Confirmation Act 1908	8 Edw. 7. c. cxiii	1 August 1908
An Act to confirm a Provisional Order under the Private Legislation Procedure (Scotland) Act 1899 relating to Ayr Corporation Tramways.
	Ayr Corporation Tramways Order 1908	
Buckie Burgh and Buckie (Cluny) Harbour Order Confirmation Act 1908 (repealed)	8 Edw. 7. c. cxiv	1 August 1908
An Act to confirm a Provisional Order under the Private Legislation Procedure (Scotland) Act 1899 relating to Buckie Burgh and Buckie (Cluny) Harbour. (Repealed by Grampian Regional Council (Harbours) Order Confirmation Act 1987 (c. x))
	Buckie Burgh and Buckie (Cluny) Harbour Order 1908	
Electric Lighting Orders Confirmation (No. 1) Act 1908	8 Edw. 7. c. cxv	1 August 1908
An Act to confirm certain Provisional Orders made by the Board of Trade under the Electric Lighting Acts 1882 (Note: Electric Lighting Act 1882 (45 & 46 Vict. c. 56)) and 1888 (Note: Electric Lighting Act 1888 (51 & 52 Vict. c. 12)) relating to Bispham-with-Norbreck Caldy Manor Carmarthen Fleetwood Halesowen Heswall Lowestoft (Amendment) Lymington (Extension) Portsmouth (Amendment) Southampton (Amendment) and Woking (Extension).
	Bispham-with-Norbreck Electric Lighting Order 1908	
	Caldy Manor Electric Lighting Order 1908	
	Carmarthen Electric Lighting Order 1908	
	Fleetwood Electric Lighting Order 1908	
	Halesowen Electric Lighting Order 1908	
	Heswall Electric Lighting Order 1908	
	Lowestoft Electric Lighting (Amendment) Order 1908	
	Lymington (Extension) Electric Lighting Order 1908	
	Portsmouth Electric Lighting Order 1908	
	Southampton Electric Lighting Order 1908	
	Woking Electric Supply Company Electric Lighting (Extension) Order 1908	
Electric Lighting Orders Confirmation (No. 2) Act 1908 (repealed)	8 Edw. 7. c. cxvi	1 August 1908
An Act to confirm certain Provisional Orders made by; the Board of Trade under the Electric Lighting Acts 1882 and 1888 the Electric Lighting (Scotland) Act 1890 (Note: Electric Lighting (Scotland) Act 1890 (53 & 54 Vict. c. 13)) and the Electric Lighting (Scotland) Act 1902 (Note: Electric Lighting (Scotland) Act 1902 (2 Edw. 7. c. 35)) relating to Barrhead Clydebank (Amendment) Dundee (Extension) and Rutherglen (Amendment). (Repealed by North of Scotland Electricity Order Confirmation Act 1958 (7 & 8 Eliz. 2. c. ii))
Electric Lighting Orders Confirmation Act 1908	8 Edw. 7. c. cxvii	1 August 1908
An Act to confirm certain Provisional Orders made by the Board of Trade under the Electric Lighting Acts 1882 and 1888 relating to Bridgend (Extension) Hendon (Amendment) Llandaff and Dinas Powis (Amendment) Llansamlet Oulton Broad Sowerby Bridge (Amendment) and Tewkesbury (Amendment).
	Bridgend Electric Lighting (Extension) Order 1908	
	Hendon Electric Lighting (Amendment) Order 1908	
	Llandaff and Dinas Powis Electric Lighting Order 1901 (Amendment) Order 1908	
	Llansamlet Electric Lighting Order 1908	
	Oulton Broad Electric Lighting Order 1908	
	Sowerby Bridge Electric Lighting (Amendment) Order 1908	
	Tewkesbury Electric Lighting (Amendment) Order 1908	
Lanarkshire Tramways Order Confirmation Act 1908	8 Edw. 7. c. cxviii	1 August 1908
An Act to confirm a Provisional Order under the Private Legislation Procedure (Scotland) Act 1899 relating to Lanarkshire Tramways.
	Lanarkshire Tramways Order 1908	
Lanarkshire (Middle Ward District) Water Order Confirmation Act 1908 (repealed)	8 Edw. 7. c. cxix	1 August 1908
An Act to confirm a Provisional Order under the Private Legislation Procedure (Scotland) Act 1899 relating to Lanarkshire (Middle Ward District) Water. (Repealed by Lanarkshire County Council Order Confirmation Act 1939 (2 & 3 Geo. 6. c. xcii))
	Lanarkshire (Middle Ward District) Water Order 1908	
Paisley District Tramways Order Confirmation Act 1908 (repealed)	8 Edw. 7. c. cxx	1 August 1908
An Act to confirm a Provisional Order under the Private Legislation Procedure (Scotland) Act 1899 relating to Paisley District Tramways. (Repealed by Glasgow Corporation Consolidation (Water, Transport and Markets) Order Confirmation Act 1964 (c. xliii))
	Paisley District Tramways Order 1908	
Land Drainage Provisional Order Confirmation Act 1908	8 Edw. 7. c. cxxi	1 August 1908
An Act to confirm a Provisional Order under the Land Drainage Act 1861 in the matter of a proposed drainage district in the Parishes of Blundeston Flixton and Oulton in the county of Suffolk.
	Land Drainage (Suffolk) Order 1908	
Metropolitan Commons Scheme Confirmation Act 1908	8 Edw. 7. c. cxxii	1 August 1908
An Act to confirm a Scheme under the Metropolitan Commons Acts 1866 to 1898 relating to Malden Green in the county of Surrey.
	Metropolitan Commons (Malden Green) Scheme.	
Troon (Loch Bradan) Water Order Confirmation Act 1908	8 Edw. 7. c. cxxiii	1 August 1908
An Act to confirm a Provisional Order under the Private Legislation Procedure (Scotland) Act 1899 relating to Troon (Loch Bradan) Water.
	Troon (Loch Bradan) Water Order 1908	
Local Government Board (Ireland) Provisional Orders Confirmation (No. 1) Act 1908	8 Edw. 7. c. cxxiv	1 August 1908
An Act to confirm certain Provisional Orders of the Local Government Board for Ireland relating to the rural districts of Limerick (No. 1) and Naas (No. 1) and the County of Westmeath and King’s County and for other purposes.
	Ballinacurra Sewerage Order 1908	
	Kilcullen Sewerage Order 1908	
	Brosna Drainage Order 1908	
Local Government Board (Ireland) Provisional Orders Confirmation (No. 2) Act 1908	8 Edw. 7. c. cxxv	1 August 1908
An Act to confirm certain Provisional Orders of the Local Government Board for Ireland relating to the City of Dublin and the urban district of Pembroke (two).
	Dublin Order 1908	
	Pembroke Order (No. 1) 1908	
	Pembroke Order (No. 2) 1908	
Local Government Board (Ireland) Provisional Orders Confirmation (No. 3) Act 1908	8 Edw. 7. c. cxxvi	1 August 1908
An Act to confirm certain Provisional Orders of the Local Government Board for Ireland relating to the County Borough of Belfast and the urban district of Letterkenny.
	Belfast Order 1908	
	Letterkenny Order 1908	
Local Government Board (Ireland) Provisional Order Confirmation (No. 4) Act 1908	8 Edw. 7. c. cxxvii	1 August 1908
An Act to confirm a certain Provisional Order of the Local Government Board for Ireland relating to the Rural District of Rathdown No. 1.
	Stillorgan Sewerage Order 1908	
Galashiels Drainage and Burgh Extension Order Confirmation Act 1908	8 Edw. 7. c. cxxviii	1 August 1908
An Act to confirm a Provisional Order under the Private Legislation Procedure (Scotland) Act 1899 relating to Galashiels Drainage and Burgh Extension.
	Galashiels Drainage and Burgh Extension Order 1908	
Falkirk and District Water Order Confirmation Act 1908	8 Edw. 7. c. cxxix	1 August 1908
An Act to confirm a Provisional Order under the Private Legislation Procedure (Scotland) Act 1899 relating to Falkirk and District Water.
	Falkirk and District Waterworks Order 1908	
Education Board Provisional Orders Confirmation (London) Act 1908	8 Edw. 7. c. cxxx	1 August 1908
An Act to confirm certain Provisional Orders made by the Board of Education under the Education Acts 1870 to 1907 to enable the London County Council to put into force the Lands Clauses Acts.
	London County Council (No. 1) Order 1908	
	London County Council (No. 2) Order 1908	
Glasgow and South Western Railway Order Confirmation Act 1908	8 Edw. 7. c. cxxxi	1 August 1908
An Act to confirm a Provisional Order under the Private Legislation Procedure (Scotland) Act 1899 relating to the Glasgow and South Western Railway.
	Glasgow and South Western Railway Order 1908	
Tramways Orders Confirmation (No. 2) Act 1908	8 Edw. 7. c. cxxxii	1 August 1908
An Act to confirm certain Provisional Orders made by the Board of Trade under the Tramways Act 1870 relating to Liverpool Corporation Tramways Extensions and Potteries and North Staffordshire Tramways (Amendment).
	Liverpool Corporation Tramways Extensions Order 1908	
	Potteries and North Staffordshire Tramways (Amendment) Order 1908	
Gas and Water Orders Confirmation Act 1908	8 Edw. 7. c. cxxxiii	1 August 1908
An Act to confirm certain Provisional Orders made by the Board of Trade under the Gas and Water Works Facilities Act 1870 (Note: Gas and Water Works Facilities Act 1870 (33 & 34 Vict. c. 70)) relating to Brough Water Burgess Hill Water Earby and Thornton Gas East Hull Gas Sevenoaks Water and Stourbridge Water.
	Brough Water Order 1908	
	Burgess Hill Water Order 1908	
	Earby and Thornton Gas Order 1908	
	East Hull Gas Order 1908	
	Stourbridge Water Order 1908	
Gas Orders Confirmation Act 1908	8 Edw. 7. c. cxxxiv	1 August 1908
An Act to confirm certain Provisional Orders made by the Board of Trade under the Gas and Water Works Facilities Act 1870 relating to Caldicot and District Gas Rainford Gas Rotliwell Gas Tenterden and District Gas and Woolmer and District Gas.
	Caldicot and District Gas Order 1908	
	Rainford Gas Order 1908	
	Rothwell Gas Order 1908	
	Tenterden and District Gas Order 1908	
	Woolmer and District Gas Order 1908	
Pier and Harbour Orders Confirmation (No. 1) Act 1908	8 Edw. 7. c. cxxxv	1 August 1908
An Act to confirm certain Provisional Orders made by the Board of Trade under the General Pier and Harbour Act 1861 (Note: General Pier and Harbour Act 1861 (24 & 25 Vict. c. 45)) relating to Bridgwater Llandudno and Whitley Bay.
	Bridgwater Port and Navigation Order 1908	
	Llandudno Pier Order 1908	
	Whitley Bay Pier Order 1908	
Pier and Harbour Orders Confirmation (No. 2) Act 1908	8 Edw. 7. c. cxxxvi	1 August 1908
An Act to confirm certain Provisional Orders made by the Board of Trade under the General Pier and Harbour Act 1861 relating to Gott Bay and Vaila.
	Gott Bay Pier Order 1908	
	Vaila Harbour Order 1908	
Pier and Harbour Order Confirmation (No. 3) Act 1908	8 Edw. 7. c. cxxxvii	1 August 1908
An Act to confirm a Provisional Order made by the Board of Trade under the General Pier and Harbour Act 1861 relating to Rothesay.
	Rothesay Harbour Order 1908	
Lanark Corporation (Extension of Boundaries, &c.) Order Confirmation Act 1908	8 Edw. 7. c. cxxxviii	1 August 1908
An Act to confirm a Provisional Order under the Private Legislation Procedure (Scotland) Act 1899 relating to Lanark Corporation.
	Lanark Corporation Order 1908	
Provisional Order (Marriages) Confirmation Act 1908 (repealed)	8 Edw. 7. c. cxxxix	1 August 1908
An Act to confirm a Provisional Order made by one of His Majesty's Principal Secretaries of State under the Provisional Order (Marriages) Act 1905. (Note: Provisional Order (Marriages) Act 1905 (5 Edw. 7. c. 23)) (Repealed by Statute Law (Repeals) Act 1977 (c. 18))
Usk Fisheries Provisional Order Confirmation Act 1908	8 Edw. 7. c. cxl	1 August 1908
An Act to confirm a Provisional Order under the Salmon and Freshwater Fisheries Act 1907 (Note: Salmon and Freshwater Fisheries Act 1907 (7 Edw. 7. c. 15)) relating to the River Usk and other waters.
	Usk Fisheries Provisional Order 1908	
Wye Fisheries Provisional Order Confirmation Act 1908	8 Edw. 7. c. cxli	1 August 1908
An Act to confirm a Provisional Order under the Salmon and Freshwater Fisheries Act 1907 relating to the River Wye and other waters.
	Wye Fisheries Provisional Order 1908	
Local Government Board's Provisional Orders Confirmation (No. 1) Act 1908	8 Edw. 7. c. cxlii	1 August 1908
An Act to confirm certain Provisional Orders of the Local Government Board relating to Bath Little Lever Stanhope Stratton and Bude and the Hemel Hempstead Joint Hospital District.
	Bath Order 1908	
	Little Lever Order 1908	
	Stanhope Order 1908	
	Stratton and Bude Order 1908	
	Hemel Hempstead Joint Hospital Order 1908	
Local Government Board's Provisional Orders Confirmation (No. 2) Act 1908	8 Edw. 7. c. cxliii	1 August 1908
An Act to confirm certain Provisional Orders of the Local Government Board relating to Bridlington Fulwood Romford and Weymouth and Melcombe Regis.
	Bridlington Order 1908	
	Fulwood Order 1908	
	Romford Order 1908	
	Weymouth and Melcombe Regis Order 1908	
Local Government Board's Provisional Orders Confirmation (No. 4) Act 1908	8 Edw. 7. c. cxliv	1 August 1908
An Act to confirm certain Provisional Orders of the Local Government Board relating to Bromley Crewe Milford Haven Rhyl Sawbridgeworth and York.
	Bromley Order 1908	
	Crewe Order 1908	
	Milford Haven Order 1908	
	Rhyl Order 1908	
	Sawbridgeworth Order 1908	
	York Order 1908	
Local Government Board's Provisional Orders Confirmation (No. 5) Act 1908	8 Edw. 7. c. cxlv	1 August 1908
An Act to confirm certain Provisional Orders of the Local Government Board relating to Bethnal Green Bradfield (Rural) Cambridge Spennymoor Surbiton and Worthing and the Accrington and Church Outfall Sewerage District (two).
	Bethnal Green Order 1908	
	Bradfield Rural Order 1908	
	Cambridge Order 1908	
	Spennymoor Order 1908	
	Surbiton Order 1908	
	Worthing Order 1908	
	Accrington and Church Order (No. 1) 1908	
	Accrington and Church Order (No. 2) 1908	
Local Government Board's Provisional Orders Confirmation (No. 6) Act 1908	8 Edw. 7. c. cxlvi	1 August 1908
An Act to confirm certain Provisional Orders of the Local Government Board relating to East Ham Gateshead Neath Salford and Shipley and the Birmingham Tame and Rea Main Sewerage District and the Middlesex Districts Joint Small-Pox Hospital District.
	East Ham Order 1908	
	Gateshead Order 1908	
	Neath Order 1908	
	Salford Order 1908	
	Shipley Order 1908	
	Birmingham Tame and Rea Main Sewerage Order 1908	
	Middlesex Districts Joint Smallpox Hospital Order 1908	
Local Government Board's Provisional Orders Confirmation (No. 7) Act 1908	8 Edw. 7. c. cxlvii	1 August 1908
An Act to confirm certain Provisional Orders of the Local Government Board relating to Abergavenny Newport Newton Abbot Stockport and Waterloo-with-Seaforth and the Wirral Joint Hospital District.
	Abergavenny Order 1908	
	Newport Order 1908	
	Newton Abbot Order 1908	
	Stockport Order 1908	
	Waterloo-with-Seaforth Order 1908	
	Wirral Joint Hospital Order 1908	
Local Government Board's Provisional Order Confirmation (No. 8) Act 1908 (repealed)	8 Edw. 7. c. cxlviii	1 August 1908
An Act to confirm a Provisional Order of the Local Government Board relating to Crewe. (Repealed by Cheshire County Council Act 1980 (c. xiii))
Local Government Board's Provisional Orders Confirmation (No. 9) Act 1908	8 Edw. 7. c. cxlix	1 August 1908
An Act to confirm certain Provisional Orders of the Local Government Board relating to Barry Bradford (Yorks) and Sutton in Ashfield.
	Barry Order 1908	
	Bradford Order 1908	
	Sutton in Ashfield Order 1908	
Local Government Board's Provisional Orders Confirmation (No. 10) Act 1908	8 Edw. 7. c. cl	1 August 1908
An Act to confirm certain Provisional Orders of the Local Government Board relating to Bethesda Monmouth and the Aspatria Silloth and District Joint Water Board District.
	Bethesda Order 1908	
	Monmouth Order 1908	
	Aspatria Silloth and District Order 1908	
Local Government Board's Provisional Order Confirmation (No. 11) Act 1908 (repealed)	8 Edw. 7. c. cli	1 August 1908
An Act to confirm a Provisional Order of the Local Government Board relating to Burton-upon-Trent. (Repealed by Staffordshire Act 1983 (c. xviii))
Edinburgh and District Water Order Confirmation Act 1908 (repealed)	8 Edw. 7. c. clii	1 August 1908
An Act to confirm a Provisional Order under the Private Legislation Procedure (Scotland) Act 1899 relating to Edinburgh and District Water. (Repealed by Edinburgh Corporation Order Confirmation Act 1958 (7 & 8 Eliz. 2. c. v))
	Edinburgh and District Water Order 1908	
Commons Regulation (Towyn Trewan) Provisional Order Act 1908	8 Edw. 7. c. cliii	1 August 1908
An Act to confirm a Provisional Order under the Inclosure Acts 1845 to 1899 relating to Towyn Trewan Common in the County of Anglesey.
	Towyn Trewan Order 1908	
Education Board Provisional Orders Confirmation (Cornwall, &c.) Act 1908	8 Edw. 7. c. cliv	21 December 1908
An Act to confirm certain Provisional Orders made by the Board of Education under the Education Acts 1870 to 1907 to enable the Councils of the Administrative County of Cornwall and the County Borough of Swansea to put in force the Lands Clauses Acts.
	Cornwall County Council Order 1908	
	Swansea County Borough Council (No. 1) Order 1908	
	Swansea County Borough Council (No. 2) Order 1908	
Kirkcaldy and Dysart Water Order Confirmation Act 1908 (repealed)	8 Edw. 7. c. clv	21 December 1908
An Act to confirm a Provisional Order under the Private Legislation Procedure (Scotland) Act 1899 relating to Kirkcaldy and Dvsart Water. (Repealed by Kirkcaldy Corporation Order Confirmation Act 1939 (2 & 3 Geo. 6. c. vi))
	Kirkcaldy and Dysart Water Order 1908	
Buxton Congregational Chapel Scheme Confirmation Act 1908	8 Edw. 7. c. clvi	21 December 1908
An Act to confirm a Scheme of the Charity Commissioners relating to the Buxton (Congregational Chapel) Charity.
	Buxton Congregational Chapel Scheme.	
Long Ashton Congregational Chapel Scheme Confirmation Act 1908	8 Edw. 7. c. clvii	21 December 1908
An Act to confirm a Scheme of the Charity Commissioners relating to the Long Ashton (Congregational Chapel Schoolroom) Charity.
	Long Ashton Congregational Chapel Scheme.	
Abbots Bromley Congregational Chapel Scheme Confirmation Act 1908	8 Edw. 7. c. clviii	21 December 1908
An Act to confirm a Scheme of the Charity Commissioners relating to the Abbots Bromley (Congregational Chapel) Charity.
	Abbots Bromley Congregational Chapel Scheme.	
North British Railway Order Confirmation Act 1908	8 Edw. 7. c. clix	21 December 1908
An Act to confirm a Provisional Order under the Private Legislation Procedure (Scotland) Act 1899 relating to the North British Railway.
	North British Railway Order 1908	
Perth Corporation Order Confirmation Act 1908	8 Edw. 7. c. clx	21 December 1908
An Act to confirm a Provisional Order under the Private Legislation Procedure (Scotland) Act 1899 relating to Perth Corporation.
	Perth Corporation Order 1908	
Post Office (Sites) Act 1908 (repealed)	8 Edw. 7. c. clxi	21 December 1908
An Act to enable His Majesty’s Postmaster-General to acquire lands in London Glasgow Bolton Devonport Dover Ilford and Stroud for the public service and for other purposes. (Repealed by Postal Services Act 2000 (Consequential Modifications to Local Enactments) Order 2003 (SI 2003/1542))
Edinburgh and Leith Corporations Gas Order Confirmation Act 1908 (repealed)	8 Edw. 7. c. clxii	21 December 1908
An Act to confirm a Provisional Order under the Private Legislation Procedure (Scotland) Act 1899 relating to the Edinburgh and Leith Corporations Gas. (Repealed by Edinburgh Corporation Order Confirmation Act 1922 (13 Geo. 5. Sess. 2. c. iv))
	Edinburgh and Leith Corporations Gas Order 1908	
Water of Leith Purification and Sewerage Order Confirmation Act 1908 (repealed)	8 Edw. 7. c. clxiii	21 December 1908
An Act to confirm a Provisional Order under the Private Legislation Procedure (Scotland) Act 1899 relating to Water of Leith Purification and Sewerage. (Repealed by Edinburgh Corporation Order Confirmation Act 1964 (c. xli))
	Water of Leith Purification and Sewerage Order 1908	
Local Government Board's Provisional Order Confirmation (No. 3) Act 1908	8 Edw. 7. c. clxiv	21 December 1908
An Act to confirm a Provisional Order of the Local Government Board relating to the Boroughs of Burslem Hanley Longton and Stoke-upon-Trent and the Urban Districts of Fenton and Tunstall.
	Borough of Stoke-on-Trent Order 1908 Provisional Order made in pursuance of Sections 54 55 and 59 of the Local Government Act 1888. (Note: Local Government Act 1888 (51 & 52 Vict. c. 41))	
Liverpool Corporation (Streets and Buildings) Act 1908 (repealed)	8 Edw. 7. c. clxv	21 December 1908
An Act for conferring on the Corporation of the City of Liverpool further powers for the better regulation of buildings the formation of streets and the laying out and development of estates within the City and for other purposes. (Repealed by Liverpool Corporation Act 1921 (11 & 12 Geo. 5. c. lxxiv))
Ards Railways Act 1908	8 Edw. 7. c. clxvi	21 December 1908
An Act for making railways in the County of Down to be called the Ards Railways and for other purposes.
London Electric Supply Act 1908	8 Edw. 7. c. clxvii	21 December 1908
An Act to confer further powers and to make further provision with respect to the supply of electrical energy in London.
London (Westminster and Kensington) Electric Supply Companies Act 1908	8 Edw. 7. c. clxviii	21 December 1908
An Act to confer further powers upon the Kensington and Knightsbridge Electric Lighting Company Limited the Notting Hill Electric Lighting Company Limited the Saint James' and Pall Mall Electric Light Company Limited the Westminster Electric Supply Corporation Limited and the Central Electric Supply Company Limited with respect to the supply of electrical energy and for other purposes.

=== Private and personal acts ===
Short title	Citation	Royal assent
Long title
Tollemache Estate Act 1908	8 Edw. 7. c. 1 Pr.	1 August 1908
An Act for authorising and requiring the trustees of the will and codicils of the Honourable Frederick James Tollemache, deceased, to invest part of the trust funds and property in their hands, subject to the trusts of the said will and codicils, upon a transfer of a mortgage for two hundred and twenty-five thousand pounds created by the Right Honourable Ada Maria Katharine Baroness Sudeley, the tenant for life under the said will and codicils, upon the security of her life interest under the said will and codicils and certain policies of assurance upon her own life, and for other purposes.
Hurly's Divorce Act 1908 (Note: This act was not printed by the King's Printer.)	8 Edw. 7. c. 2 Pr.	18 June 1908
An Act to dissolve the Marriage of Honoria Hurly with Maurice Randall Hurly, a Major in the 93rd Burma Infantry, her now husband, and to enable her to marry again, and for other purposes.

=== Sources ===
- Volume 46 - 8 Edward VII - 1908 – via Internet Archive.

== See also ==
- List of acts of the Parliament of the United Kingdom
