= Parades in Northern Ireland =

Northern Irish cultural phenomenon

Parades are a prominent cultural feature of Northern Ireland. The overwhelming majority of parades are held by Ulster Protestant, unionist or Ulster loyalist groups, but some Irish nationalist, republican and non-political groups also parade. Due to longstanding controversy surrounding the contentious nature of some parades, a quasi-judicial public body, the Parades Commission, exists to place conditions and settle disputes. Although not all parading groups recognise the commission's authority, its decisions are legally binding.

== Unionist parades ==
The majority of parades in Northern Ireland (nearly 70% in 2003/4) are organised by Protestant and/or unionist groups, leading some people to view attempts to restrict parades as an attack on Protestant and/or unionist culture. Parades typically take place on Saturdays, which means that participants and spectators do not have to take time off work, and avoid parading on Sunday, which some Protestants believe should only be spent on purely religious activities. The only exceptions to this are the Twelfth of July parades, which are held on the same date each year, (unless the 12th falls on a Sunday, in which case it is postponed to Monday the 13th), and church parades, which are held on Sunday.

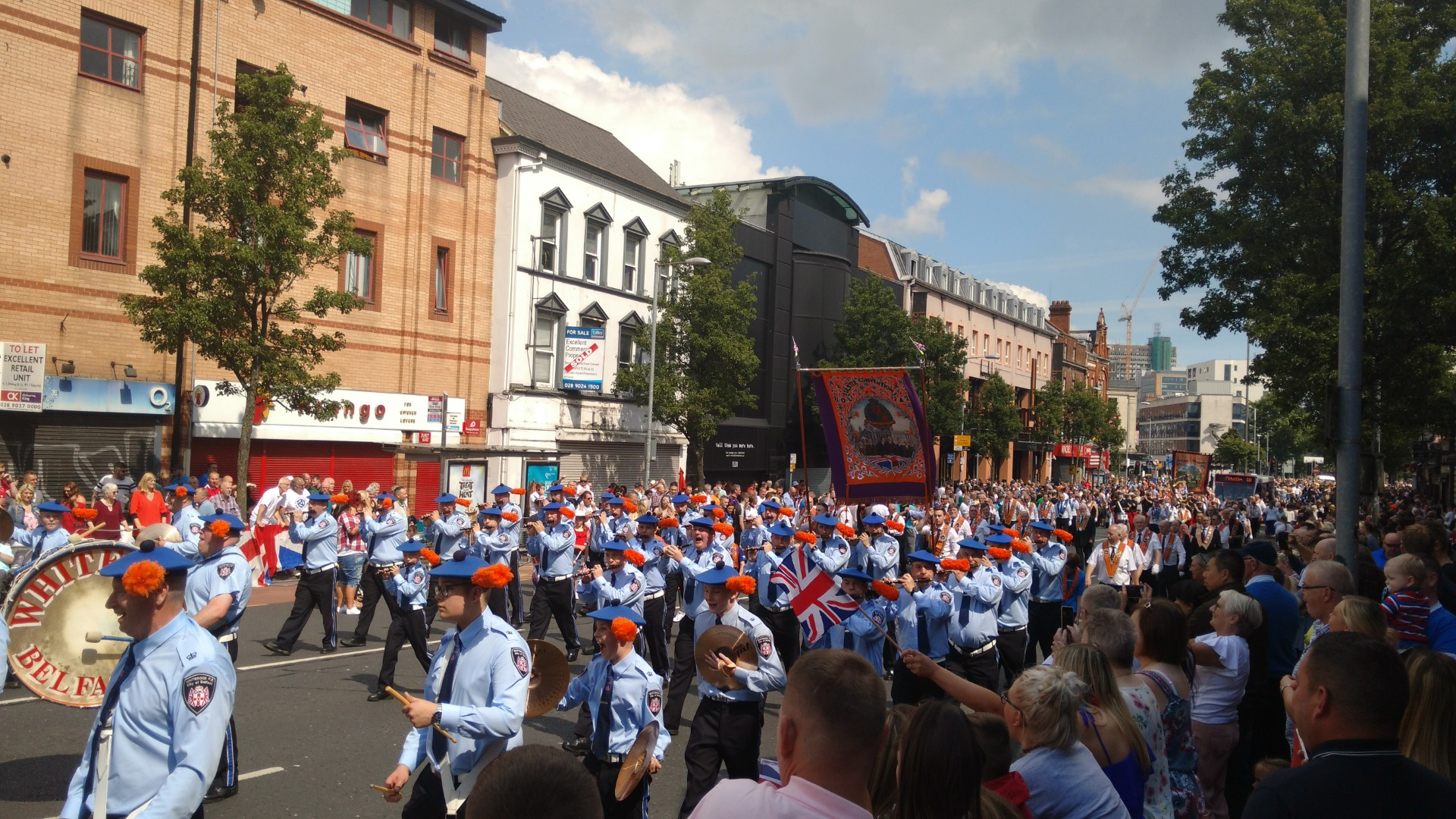
Loyalist July 12th parade in Belfast in 2017 near Sandy Row

=== Orange Institution ===
The Orange Institution holds hundreds of parades throughout Northern Ireland every year. The biggest of these are usually on the twelfth of July ('The Twelfth'), in commemoration of the Battle of the Boyne. Individual lodges also parade at various times of the year, particularly leading up to the Twelfth. Parades in memory of the dead of World War I, particularly the 36th (Ulster) Division at the Battle of the Somme, are held in July and November. Junior lodges from Armagh, South Tyrone and Fermanagh parade annually at the end of May. On the last Saturday in October, Reformation Day is celebrated with the year's last major Orange parades. In Belfast, these proceed to Saint Anne's Cathedral for a church service.

=== Apprentice Boys ===
Members of the Royal Black Institution parade in Lisburn on "Black Saturday", 2007.

The Apprentice Boys of Derry exist in commemoration of the siege of Derry in the seventeenth century. The Boys' biggest celebration is held in Derry on the Saturday nearest 12 August each year, in commemoration of the lifting of the siege. They also parade on the Saturday nearest 18 December, in commemoration of the original apprentice boys shutting the gates of the town against King James II's troops, and at Easter. Most Apprentice Boys' parades are held in the city of Derry.

=== Royal Black Institution ===
The main parade of the Royal Black Institution is held on the last Saturday of August and is known as Last or Black Saturday. This was originally held on 12 August in commemoration of the end of the siege of Derry, but in the 1950s the date of the event was moved. Local parades are held in Belfast in the two weeks beforehand. Its other major event is the "sham fight" at Scarva on 13 July, in which an actor playing William of Orange ritually defeats an actor playing James II, thus re-enacting the victory of the Williamite forces at the Battle of the Boyne. There is also a 12 August Battle of Newtownbutler celebration parade held in Fermanagh. It was previously held on the same date as the "Remembering the Siege of Derry", but has now been moved to the Saturday before in an attempt to attract larger crowds and more participants.

=== Bands ===
As well as accompanying the above organisations on their parades, many marching bands also hold their own parades, often as a fund-raising activity. These are often combined with band competitions—which other bands in the United Kingdom are invited to compete in—sometimes amounting to over 100 bands for a single parade. Band parades are more regular than loyal order parades, with numerous parades every weekend from early April until the end of September.

== Nationalist parades ==
Parades are much less common among nationalist or republican communities. According to the Parades Commission, less than 5% of parades in Northern Ireland are nationalist/republican.

=== Ancient Order of Hibernians ===
Compared to most Protestant organisations the Ancient Order of Hibernians parade relatively infrequently, their main parades being on Saint Patrick's Day, at Easter, and on Lady Day. At various points during the Troubles, Hibernians offered to cease parading if Protestant groups did the same.

=== Irish National Foresters ===
The Irish National Foresters are a nationalist fraternal organisation. Although they are open to Irish people of any religion, the majority of their members are Catholics. Their main parading date is the Sunday closest to 1 August.

=== Republican parades ===
Northern Ireland's biggest annual republican parade takes place in August, during Féile an Phobail. This began as a protest against internment without trial and evolved into a festival that celebrates Gaelic and republican culture. Republican parades are also held in January to commemorate Bloody Sunday, and at Easter to commemorate the 1916 Easter Rising. There is a Republican March every year to commemorate the anniversary of the 1981 Hunger Strike. The parade is attended by Republican figures such as Gerry Adams. Republican parades are attended by Irish Republican bands that come from Scotland, England and Ireland, especially the march in August to commemorate the anniversary of the 1981 Hunger Strike.

=== Civil rights marches ===
In the late 1960s and early 1970s, groups of civil activists such as the Northern Ireland Civil Rights Association (NICRA) and People's Democracy attempted to use the protest march tactics of contemporary protest movements elsewhere in the world to draw attention to political, social and economic discrimination against Catholics in Northern Ireland. The civil rights marches and the reaction to them were a major contributing factor to the outbreak of The Troubles, due largely to heavy-handed policing.

== Easter ==
Easter is a major parading time for both communities, and is often considered to be the start of the year's "marching season". A number of republican groups also commemorate the Easter Rising. According to Neil Jarman, Protestants began parading at Easter in the 1930s to counter republican parading, but "few people are aware of this, and Easter parades are now an accepted part of the loyalist tradition".

== Non-sectarian parades ==
A number of parades are held in Northern Ireland, especially in Belfast, which are not associated with any particular religious tradition. They are subject to the same laws and regulations as other parades.

=== Lord Mayor's parade ===
Several cities in Northern Ireland hold Lord Mayor's parades marking the end of the mayor's term in office. These are usually carnival-type events that evolved from the more stately affairs held in many cities in the United Kingdom since the Middle Ages. The Belfast parade takes place in May; the 2007 theme was "Love and Friendship".

=== Salvation Army ===
As in other countries, The Salvation Army in Northern Ireland sometimes parades with brass bands. Salvation Army parades are generally not seen as controversial or sectarian, and their parades have not led to any problems.

=== Belfast Pride ===
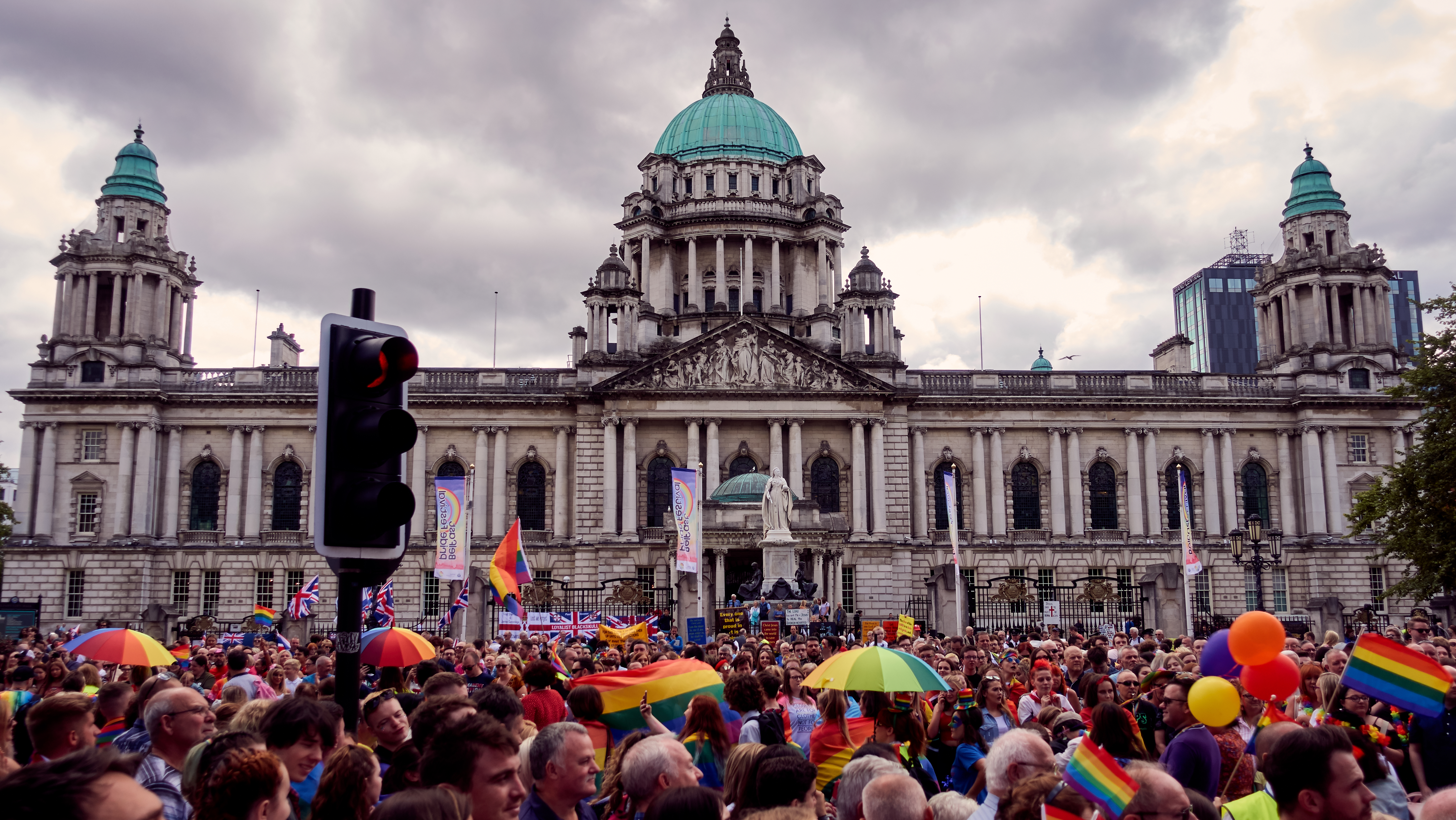
Belfast Pride 2018, passing Belfast City Hall

An LGBT+ Pride parade has been held in Belfast each year since the early 1990s. The parade has been seen as controversial due to public perceptions of LGBT+ Rights in Northern Ireland, as Northern Ireland has more traditionalist Protestants and Catholics. In 2005 a number of Christian groups called for it to be banned, but the Parades Commission ruled that it could go ahead. It is sometimes described as one of the few genuine cross-community events in Northern Ireland.

=== Remembrance Sunday parades ===
War memorial parades are mainly attended by the unionist population of Northern Ireland, but recently nationalists have started to get involved. Some war memorial parades are run by Protestant organisations such as the Orange Order. However those on Remembrance Sunday (the Sunday closest to 11 November) are organised by local councils or the British Legion and commemorate war dead of all religious backgrounds. Remembrance Sunday parades usually consist of a march by veterans or local military units or both to a Remembrance Sunday ceremony, usually held at a war memorial, and often another march to a church service. In Belfast, the Belfast Cenotaph at City Hall is used for the ceremony.

=== St. Patrick's Day parades ===
There are many parades on St. Patrick's Day throughout Northern Ireland. Although the parade celebrates the Patron Saint's stature as the Patron Saint of Ireland, it has been recognised that St. Patrick is the patron saint of the island of Ireland, and the patron saint of both Nationalists and Unionists throughout Ireland. In recent years, loyal orders such as the Orange Order and the Apprentice Boys of Derry have held parades to mark St. Patrick's day.

=== Youth organisations ===
Some youth organisations, such as the Boys' Brigade, take part in or organise parades and drills throughout the calendar.

== Controversy ==
Parading is a controversial issue in Northern Ireland. In general, debates centre on the route of particular parades; people from one community often object to parades by "the other side" passing through or near "their" area, exclusively the Orange Order parades marching through mainly nationalist or republican areas. A few parades are seen as objectionable regardless of route. These involve or commemorate paramilitary groups, such as the Provisional Irish Republican Army and Ulster Defence Association, and otherwise non-controversial parades have sometimes caused conflict because of a band or lodge carrying a banner or flag associated with a paramilitary group.

=== Attempts to control parading ===
Since the nineteenth century the British government and various local authorities have attempted to control parades and the disorder that sometimes accompanies them. The Orange Order and its parades were banned for a period in the nineteenth century. In an address to the British House of Commons, in July 1815, Henry Parnell called for an inquiry into the Orange Lodges in Ireland and noted that 14 petitions requesting such an inquiry saying:

to the existence of Orange Lodges in Ireland, was mainly attributed the disturbances of public peace, particularly by the celebrations of processions with certain insignia etc.... [and that] besides the agitation which these necessarily produced they beget a counter spirit among the people, that led to animosities, which, in their consequences, produced riots.

A Parliamentary Select Committee was set up to investigate the Orange Societies in 1835. When the Select Committee published its report a Cabinet council was held at the Foreign Office for the purpose of agreeing the terms of the resolutions which were to be submitted to the House of Commons by Lord John Russell, Secretary of State for the Home Department, on 23 Feb 1836. This resolution stated:

That it is the opinion of this house that the existence of any political society in Ireland, consisting exclusively of persons preferring one religious faith, using secret signs and symbols, and acting by means of affiliated branches, tend to injure the peace of society – to derogate from the authority of the Crown, to weaken the supremacy of the law, and to impair the religious freedom of his majesty's subjects in that part of the United Kingdom. That an humble address be presented to his majesty, laying before him the foregoing resolution, and praying that his majesty will take such steps for the discouragement of all such societies as may seem to his majesty most desirable.

The Secretary of State read the following response from the King to the House of Commons on Thursday 25 Feb 1836:

William Rex – I willing assert to the prayer of my faithful Commons, that I will be pleased to take such measures as shall seem advisable for the effectual discouragement of Orange Lodges, and generally of all political societies excluding persons of a different religious persuasion using signs and symbols, and acting by means of associated lodges. It is my firm intention to discourage all such societies, and I rely with confidence upon the fidelity of my loyal subjects to support me in my determination.

The following day Lord Russell read the response of the Grand Master of the Orange Order, the Duke of Cumberland, brother of King William iv to the House of Commons on 26 February. It said:

I have received your Lordships letter, with the copy of the resolutions of the House of Commons on the Subject of Orange Lodges, together with his majesties gracious answer there to. Before I received your lordships communication, I had already taken steps, with several influential members, to recommend their immediate dissolution. In conformity with the wish expressed by his majesty, I shall take all legal steps to dissolve Orange Lodges.

The Grand Orange Lodge of Ireland met in Dublin on 13 April 1836 and voted in favour of dissolving the organisation. However, Orangemen in Portadown met in secret and resolved to set up a provisional Grand Lodge in the town.

The British government's policy of banning sectarian parades was eventually overturned after a campaign of defiance led by William Johnston of Ballykilbeg. The 1st Government of Northern Ireland passed the Civil Authorities (Special Powers) Act (Northern Ireland) 1922, which allowed the Home Affairs Minister to do virtually anything he thought necessary to preserve law and order. Over the next thirty years this was used many times to ban or re-route nationalist, republican and some left-wing parades, marches and meetings. In 1951, the government passed the Public Order Act, which required parade organisers to give the police forty-eight hours notice of their intent to parade. The local head of police could then ban or re-route the parade if he felt it might lead to a breach of public order. The only exceptions to this rule were funerals and parades normally held along a particular route. Since Orange parades had been allowed along the same routes without interference for years, this essentially meant that most Orange parades were exempt from having to give notice. The new Act was used disproportionately against nationalist parades, although from time to time Ministers attempted to stop unionist groups from parading through predominantly nationalist areas. This always met with fierce hostility from the Orange Order and often from within the Ulster Unionist Party that made up the government. Several Home Affairs Ministers were forced to make public apologies after interfering with unionist parades and two (Brian Maginess and W.W.B. Topping) were moved from the position after banning unionist band parades.

From the late 1960s, parading and marching became a much more fraught issue. The Public Order Act was used against numerous marches, and the issue of parading and of who was allowed to march in what area became even more heated. In 1969 an Apprentice Boys parade in Derry led to what is now known as the Battle of the Bogside, considered by many to mark the start of the Troubles. Several months-long bans on parading were made in the early 1970s, although none of these covered the main Protestant parading period. The Special Powers and Public Order Acts were modified on several occasions in the 1970s and 1980s.

Several areas have been the focus of a disproportionate amount of conflict over parading. These include Derry, Ormeau Road in Belfast, and especially the Drumcree area of Portadown. The Drumcree conflict flared up in the 1970s, the mid-1980s and the mid to late 1990s. Disputes over whether the Orange Order should be allowed to parade through mainly nationalist areas were often accompanied by severe violence. In 1983-4 a group of republican activists in the town researched the history of sectarian violence in the area as part of a campaign to have the Drumcree and other Orange marches banned from nationalist parts of Portadown. Their findings were distributed to visiting journalists in 1997 and presented in abridged form to the Parades Commission that was set up by the British Government in 1998 in an attempt to deal with contentious parades. The Parades Commission has the power to ban, restrict, re-route or impose conditions on any parade in Northern Ireland. The Orange Order has refused to acknowledge the commission's authority, although the lodges involved in the Drumcree dispute have recently agreed on principle to negotiate.

== Dates of major parades ==
Date	Groups involved	Event
17 March	Various	Saint Patrick's Day
Easter Sunday	Republicans	Commemorates the Easter Rising (1916)
5 May	Republicans	Commemorates the republican hunger strike (1981)
1 July	Various groups, mostly unionist	Commemorates the Battle of the Somme (1916)
1st Sunday in July	Orange Order	"Drumcree Sunday"
12 July	Orange Order	The Twelfth
9 August	Republicans	Commemorates the introduction of internment (1971)
Saturday nearest 12 August	Apprentice Boys of Derry	Commemorates the relief of the Siege of Derry (1689)
−15 August	Ancient Order of Hibernians	Lady Day
last Saturday in August	Royal Black Institution	"Black Saturday"
last Sunday in October	Orange Order	Reformation Day
2nd Sunday in November	British Legion and others	Remembrance Sunday
Saturday nearest 18 December	Apprentice Boys of Derry	Commemorates the shutting of the gates by the 13 apprentice boys during the Siege of Derry (1688)

== Number of parades ==
According to the Parades Commission, a total of 3405 parades (not counting funerals) were held in Northern Ireland in 2007. The following table groups these parades by type and sponsoring organisation.

Organisation or type	Political affiliation	Number of parades	No. of sensitive parades
Loyalist bands	Unionist	483	33
Orange Order	Unionist	452	23
Civic (including schools, trade unions, community groups)	Non-aligned, mixed or either	249	5
Apprentice Boys of Derry	Unionist	231	17
Royal Black and Royal Arch Purple	Unionist	167	5
Church parades (including Boys' Brigade, Girl Guides, Legion of Mary etc.)	Non-aligned	157	0
Military (including British Legion)	Non-aligned	149	1
Other		98	0
Nationalist bands	Nationalist	59	11
Other nationalist/republican (includes political parties)	Nationalist	51	5
Hibernians and Foresters	Nationalist	28	2
Other unionist (includes political parties)	Unionist	21	0
Residents' groups	Nationalist	6	2
Total unionist/loyalist (excluding church parades)		1354	78
Total nationalist/republican (excluding church parades)		144	20

The Police Service of Northern Ireland uses different statistics, and recorded a total of 2863 parades in 2007. Of these, 2270 were loyalist, 144 nationalist, and 449 neither. Four of these were illegal and of these three were nationalist. 45 parades were re-routed, of which all but two (one nationalist, one other) were loyalist, and 78 parades had other conditions imposed, of which 70 were loyalist, 7 nationalist and one neither. Disorder occurred at just ten parades, of which nine were loyalist and one nationalist. This is a significant decline from previous years; in 2005 disorder was recorded at 34 parades.

== See also ==
- Banners in Northern Ireland
- Drumcree conflict
- 1997 nationalist riots in Northern Ireland

== Sources ==
- Neil Jarman, extract from Material Conflicts: Parades and Visual Displays in Northern Ireland (1997)
- Key dates in the parading calendar at CAIN Web Service
- Irish Emergency Parades Committee (IPEC) and Brehan Law Society, International Observer and Breannual report on marching season from 2001 to 2007
