= Prosecution of Offences Act 1979 =

Act of the Parliament of the United Kingdom

Prosecution of Offences Act 1979 (Note: Section 12(1).)
- Act of Parliament
- Parliament of the United Kingdom
- Long title: An Act to consolidate certain enactments relating to the prosecution of offences in England and Wales and to repeal certain obsolete enactments relating thereto.
- Citation: 1979 c. 31
- Territorial extent: England and Wales (Note: Section 12(3).)

Dates
- Royal assent: 4 April 1979
- Commencement: 4 May 1979 (Note: Section 12(2).)
- Repealed: 1 October 1986
Other legislation
Amends	Public Order Act 1936; See § Repealed enactments
Repeals/revokes	See § Repealed enactments
Amended by	Representation of the People Act 1983
Repealed by	Prosecution of Offences Act 1985

Status: Repealed

Text of statute as originally enacted

The Prosecution of Offences Act 1979 (c. 31) was an act of the Parliament of the United Kingdom that consolidated enactments relating to the prosecution of offences in England and Wales.

== Provisions ==
=== Repealed enactments ===
Section 11(2) of the act repealed 11 enactments, listed in parts I and II of schedule 2 to the act.

Part I - Repeal of Obsolete Enactments
Citation	Short title	Extent of repeal
42 & 43 Vict. c. 22	Prosecution of Offences Act 1879	In section 5, the words "justice or", in the first place where they occur, and the words from "A failure" onwards. Section 7.
8 Edw. 7. c. 3	Prosecution of Offences Act 1908	Section 2(4).

Part II - Consequential Repeals
Citation	Short title	Extent of repeal
42 & 43 Vict. c. 22	Prosecution of Offences Act 1879	The whole act, so far as unrepealed.
47 & 48 Vict. c. 58	Prosecution of Offences Act 1884	The whole act.
8 Edw. 7. c. 3	Prosecution of Offences Act 1908	The whole act, so far as unrepealed.
15 & 16 Geo. 5. c. 86	Criminal Justice Act 1925	Section 34.
1965 c. 2	Administration of Justice Act 1965	Section 27.
1967 c. 80	Criminal Justice Act 1967	In Schedule 6, paragraph 2.
1968 c. 19	Criminal Appeal Act 1968	In Schedule 5, the entry relating to the Prosecution of Offences Act 1879.
1971 c. 23	Courts Act 1971	In Schedule 8, paragraph 13.
1975 c. 59	Criminal Jurisdiction Act 1975	Section 12. In section 14(2)(a), the words "12 and".

== Subsequent developments ==
The whole act was repealed by section 31(6) of, and the second schedule to, the Prosecution of Offences Act 1985, which came into force on 1 October 1986.
