= Public Order Act =

Public Order Act (with its variations) is a stock short title used for legislation in Malaysia, Rhodesia, Sierra Leone, Hong Kong, Singapore, the Republic of Ireland and the United Kingdom, relating to public order offences.

== List ==
=== Hong Kong ===
- The Public Order Ordinance 1967, an Act passed following the 1967 riots

=== Malaysia ===
- The Public Order (Preservation) Act 1958

=== Republic of Ireland ===
- The Criminal Justice (Public Order) Act, 1994
- The Criminal Justice (Public Order) Act 2003

=== Rhodesia ===
- The Public Order Act 1955, an Act giving the police the power to detain and restrict without trial.

=== Sierra Leone ===
- The Public Order Act 1965

=== Singapore ===
- The Public Order Act 2009

=== United Kingdom ===
Acts of the Parliament of the United Kingdom:

- The Public Order Act 1936 (1 Edw. 8 & 1 Geo. 6. c. 6)
- The Public Order Act 1963 (c. 52)
- The Public Order Act 1986 (c. 64)
- The Criminal Justice and Public Order Act 1994 (c. 33)
- The Public Order (Amendment) Act 1996 (c. 59)
- The Public Order Act 2023 (c. 15)

Acts of the Parliament of Northern Ireland:

- The Public Order Act (Northern Ireland) 1951 (c. 19 (N.I.))
- The Public Order (Amendment) Act (Northern Ireland) 1970 (c. 4)

The following Orders in Council, passed due to the suspension of home rule in Northern Ireland, are considered to be primary legislation:

- The Public Order (Northern Ireland) Order 1987 (SI 1987/463 (N.I. 7))
- The Public Order (Amendment) (Northern Ireland) Order 1997 (SI 1997/1181 (N.I. 10))

Act of the Scottish Parliament:

- The Police, Public Order and Criminal Justice (Scotland) Act 2006 (asp 10)

== See also ==
- List of short titles
- Riot Acts
