= Flags and Emblems (Display) Act (Northern Ireland) 1954 =

- Act of Parliament
- Parliament of Northern Ireland
- Long title: An Act to make provision with respect to the display of certain flags and emblems.
- Citation: 1954 c. 10 (N.I.)

Dates
- Royal assent: 6 April 1954
- Commencement: 6 April 1954
- Repealed: 2 April 1987

Other legislation
- Repealed by: Public Order (Northern Ireland) Order 1987
- Relates to: Civil Authorities (Special Powers) Act (Northern Ireland) 1922; Public Order Act (Northern Ireland) 1951

Status: Repealed

History of passage through Parliament

Text of statute as originally enacted

The Flags and Emblems (Display) Act (Northern Ireland) 1954 (c. 10 (N.I.)) was an act of the Parliament of Northern Ireland, passed in 1954. It empowered the Royal Ulster Constabulary (RUC) to order the removal of any "emblem" whose public display was likely to lead to a breach of the peace, with exemption and protection for display of the Union Jack. The main emblem targeted under the act was the Irish tricolour. The act was bitterly resented by Irish nationalists, who saw it as deliberately designed to suppress their identity. It was repealed by the Public Order (Northern Ireland) Order 1987 made by the Northern Ireland Secretary during direct rule over Northern Ireland.

== Background ==
The Ulster unionist majority in Northern Ireland regarded the Irish tricolour as specific to the Republic of Ireland (originally the Irish Free State) and not symbolic of the whole island of Ireland, and deprecated its use with United Ireland symbolism as irredentism. Conversely, the Irish nationalist minority saw the tricolour as a symbol of their identity and political aspirations, and many deprecated the Union Jack as a symbol of imperialist subjugation. In 1933, the Craigavon ministry made Regulation 24C under the Civil Authorities (Special Powers) Act (Northern Ireland) 1922 to ban public display of the tricolour when "representing the Irish Republican Army ... an Irish Republic ... or... any ... unlawful association"; the order was interpreted as a ban in all circumstances unless flown explicitly to represent the Irish Free State. The playing of "The Soldier's Song", the Free State national anthem, was not subject to such an explicit ban but rather came under a general prohibition on performances likely to lead to a breach of the peace.

Later legal problems with Regulation 24C provided impetus for a switch to regulating the Irish flag on a similar basis to the anthem. In 1949, the southern state became a republic, meaning the order now explicitly banned the flag of a sovereign state with which the UK had friendly relations, a diplomatic problem. Also, the order referred to the flag as a tricolour of "green white and yellow" whereas its actual colours are green white and orange; on this basis, the High Court of Northern Ireland overturned James McSparran's 1951 conviction for displaying the flag in Enniskillen.

There were also political grounds for increasing protection of the Union Flag. The act was introduced at a time of some turmoil within unionism. A more lenient approach by the Brookeborough ministry to some nationalist parades had led to an increase in the flying of the tricolour. Also, celebrations of the 1953 coronation of Elizabeth II had led to the erection of Union Flags, not only in unionist enclaves, but in nationalist areas where disputes erupted and where some Union Flags were taken down and replaced with tricolours. In Ballymacash and Dungiven the RUC to prevent conflict negotiated removal of both Irish and Union flags, attracting criticism from unionists elsewhere. Nationalists had also organised boycotts of shops which openly celebrated the coronation with the display of the Union Flag, increasing tension and unionist fears. Hardline unionists accused the government of appeasing nationalists; dissent that was viewed with alarm by Brookeborough's Ulster Unionist Party, which initiated the legislation in response.

== Provisions ==
Although it did not refer explicitly to the Irish tricolour, it did the Union Flag. The act gave the RUC a positive duty to remove any flag or emblem from public or private property which was considered to be likely to cause a breach of the peace, but legally exempted the Union Flag from ever being considered a breach of the peace. As a result, of all the flags likely to be displayed in Northern Ireland, almost exclusively the tricolour would be deemed a breach of the peace.

Violations of the act (interfering with a Union Jack, or refusing to comply with an RUC order to remove an emblem) were punishable under summary conviction by a fine up to £50, or up to six months in prison; on indictment the limits were £500 and five years respectively.

The act was vague in defining both which agencies are responsible and the scope of the offences.

== Effect ==
The first prosecution was in Glenarm, County Antrim on 2 September 1955, of three men from Carnlough who on 14 July had taken a Union Flag from outside a house in Carnlough and burned it. The resident magistrate fined each of them £5 for "preventing the display" of the flag under the 1954 act, and £1 for stealing the flag.

The enforcement of the act could on occasion lead to rioting, most notoriously during the 1964 UK general election in Belfast West. On Divis Street at the end of the Falls Road, at the headquarters of the Republican Clubs candidate Billy McMillen, a tricolour was hanging inside the window, which Ian Paisley reported to the RUC, who initially refused to act, given that the location was predominantly nationalist. On 28 September, after Paisley had threatened to take supporters to remove the flag himself, RUC officers moved past a crowd of mainly young republican protesters, smashed open the door, and removed the flag, using the 1954 act's power to enter premises without a warrant. The following day McMillen replaced the flag, which was then confiscated by the RUC via a smashed window, as another standoff with republicans escalated into a night of rioting.

The last prosecution under the 1954 act was in 1969.

In the committee stage debate on the bill for the 1973 Northern Ireland border poll, Gerry Fitt proposed unsuccessfully that, during the referendum campaign, the 1954 act be suspended (as well as the 1922 special powers act and the Public Order Act (Northern Ireland) 1951) to facilitate those campaigning for a United Ireland vote.

The erroneous belief remained widespread until its 1987 repeal that the 1954 act made publicly flying the tricolour in Northern Ireland technically illegal in all circumstances. A 2013 report found some unionists thought it remained illegal even then.

== Repeal ==
Under the Northern Ireland Constitution Act 1973 and Northern Ireland Act 1974, the UK government in London had direct rule over Northern Ireland, the Parliament of Northern Ireland was abolished, and acts it had passed could be amended or replaced by statutory instruments made by the Northern Ireland Office and laid before the houses of the Westminster Parliament for approval. The first (1975) report of the Standing Advisory Commission on Human Rights recommended repeal of the 1954 act, on the grounds that its existence offended nationalists and its useful functions could be exercised under other laws.

Under the 1985 Anglo-Irish Agreement, the UK government and Irish government held regular meetings on Northern Ireland matters as the Anglo-Irish Intergovernmental Conference (AIIGC). Ulster unionists opposed the 1985 agreement as condoning interference by a foreign state in British affairs. The AIIGC would consider "measures to recognise and accommodate the rights and identities of the two traditions in Northern Ireland ... [including] the use of flags and emblems". The Irish Times reported that the Irish government had in early 1986 proposed at the AIIGC that the tricolour and Union Flag have equal status in Northern Ireland.

Repeal was finally effected by the Public Order (Northern Ireland) Order 1987. The order was a consolidation and amendment of public order law in Northern Ireland, aligning it more closely to public order law in Great Britain and repealing some of the provisions most resented by nationalists, including the 1954 act. A draft of the order was discussed at the AIIGC in December 1986, submitted at Westminster in February 1987, amended after feedback, and approved in March, despite unionist opposition. The Irish Times reported that unionist opposition to repealing the 1954 act was partly general opposition to the workings of the 1985 agreement and partly that it would not so much raise the tricolour's status as lower that of the Union Flag. Tom King, the Northern Ireland Secretary, said during the debate on the order:

The repeal of the Act will not affect the fact that the Union flag is the official flag of the United Kingdom and will continue to be the flag that is flown from public buildings on public occasions. There is no question of the Irish tricolour being given any status by the repeal. It will no longer be an offence in itself to interfere with the display of the Union flag on private property—such as might have occurred under the Act—but any such interference would involve the commission of other criminal or civil offences, such as criminal damage, so the peaceful display of the Union flag or any other flag will continue to be protected. The police will also retain their general duty under common law to take whatever steps are necessary to prevent a breach of the peace arising from the provocative display of any flag or emblem.

The draft order was approved by both houses on 10 March; the formal order in council was made on 18 March and came into operation on 2 April 1987.
