= Public Order Act 1936 =

Act of the Parliament of the United Kingdom

Public Order Act 1936 (Note: Section 10(1).)
- Act of Parliament
- Parliament of the United Kingdom
- Long title: An Act to prohibit the wearing of uniforms in connection with political objects and the maintenance by private persons of associations of military or similar character; and to make further provision for the preservation of public order on the occasion of public processions and meetings and in public places.
- Citation: 1 Edw. 8 & 1 Geo. 6. c. 6
- Territorial extent: England and Wales; Scotland; (Note: Section 10(2).)

Dates
- Royal assent: 18 December 1936
- Commencement: 1 January 1937 (Note: Section 10(3))
Other legislation
Amends	Public Meeting Act 1908
Amended by	Statute Law Revision Act 1950; Public Order Act 1963; Police Act 1964; Police (Scotland) Act 1967; Sheriff Courts (Scotland) Act 1971; District Courts (Scotland) Act 1975; Criminal Jurisdiction Act 1975; Bail Act 1976; Prosecution of Offences Act 1979; Public Order Act 1986; Criminal Procedure (Consequential Provisions) (Scotland) Act 1995; Law Officers Act 1997; Serious Organised Crime and Police Act 2005

Status: Amended

Text of statute as originally enacted

Revised text of statute as amended

Text of the Public Order Act 1936 as in force today (including any amendments) within the United Kingdom, from legislation.gov.uk.

The Public Order Act 1936 (1 Edw. 8 & 1 Geo. 6. c. 6) is an act of the Parliament of the United Kingdom passed to control extremist political movements in the 1930s such as the British Union of Fascists (BUF).

== Provisions ==
Largely the work of Home Office civil servant Frank Newsam, the act banned the wearing of political uniforms in any public place or public meeting. (The first conviction under the act was of police officer and fascist-sympathizer William Henry Wood, by Leeds Magistrates' Court on 27 January 1937.) It also required police consent for political marches to go ahead (now covered by the Public Order Act 1986). The act also prohibited organising, training or equipping an "association of persons ... for the purpose of enabling them to be employed in usurping the functions of the police or of the armed forces of the Crown", or "for the use or display of physical force in promoting any political object".

While the act likely prevented a rapid comeback of the BUF, it may in fact have had the indirect result of actually improving their fortunes. The party's forced abandonment of paramilitary and armed tactics improved their relations with the police and, by making it more "respectable", increased the BUF appeal among traditionally conservative middle-class citizens, who became the party's main base in the years after the Public Order Act 1936 was passed.

The act was used extensively against IRA and Sinn Féin demonstrations in the 1970s, though the act does not extend to Northern Ireland. In November 1974, twelve people were each fined the maximum £50 under the act for wearing black berets at Speakers' Corner during a Sinn Féin anti-internment rally.

The act was used extensively against the flying pickets during the 1984/85 miners' strike. The police used it on the grounds of preventing a breach of the peace. In 2015 and 2016, it was used against Paul Golding and Jayda Fransen of the far-right political movement Britain First.

=== Section 5 – Conduct conducive to breach of the peace ===
Section 5 of the act created the offence of conduct conducive to breach of the peace. This section was repealed by section 40(3) of, and schedule 3 to, the Public Order Act 1986. The offence under this section was abolished by section 9(2)(d) of that act.

The offence under section 5 of the act is replaced by the offence of fear or provocation of violence, contrary to section 4 of the Public Order Act 1986.

== See also ==
- Battle of Cable Street
- Public Order Act

== Bibliography ==
- Pollen, Annebella (2019). The Public Order Act: Defining Political Uniform in 1930s Britain. Bloomsbury Academic.
