= Prosecution of Offences Act 1884 =

Act of the Parliament of the United Kingdom

Prosecution of Offences Act 1884 (Note: Section 1.)
- Act of Parliament
- Parliament of the United Kingdom
- Long title: An Act for amending the Prosecution of Offences Act, 1879.
- Citation: 47 & 48 Vict. c. 58
- Territorial extent: United Kingdom

Dates
- Royal assent: 14 August 1884
- Commencement: 14 August 1884 (Note: Section 2.)
- Repealed: 4 May 1979
Other legislation
Amends	Prosecution of Offences Act 1879
Amended by	Prosecution of Offences Act 1908; Police Act 1964
Repealed by	Prosecution of Offences Act 1979

Status: Repealed

Text of statute as originally enacted

The Prosecution of Offences Act 1884 (47 & 48 Vict. c. 58) was an act of the Parliament of the United Kingdom. Its main purpose was to modify the original Prosecution of Offences Act 1879, merging the roles of Director of Public Prosecutions and Treasury Solicitor (Section 2), though it also put in place a requirement for Commissioners and Assistant Commissioners and District Superintendents of the Metropolitan Police, Commissioners of the City of London Police, Chief Constables and the heads of every other county, city and borough police forces in England to report to the Director (Sections 3–4). Its Section 2 was itself repealed by the Prosecution of Offences Act 1908 (8 Edw. 7. c. 3), again splitting the two roles.

== Subsequent developments ==
The whole act was repealed by section 11(2) of, and part II of the schedule to, the Prosecution of Offences Act 1979, which came into force on 4 May 1979.
