= Civil Authorities (Special Powers) Act (Northern Ireland) 1922 =

Act of the Parliament of Northern Ireland

- Act of Parliament
- Parliament of Northern Ireland
- Long title: An Act to empower certain authorities of the Government of Northern Ireland to take steps for preserving the peace and maintaining order in Northern Ireland, and for purposes connected therewith.
- Citation: 12 & 13 Geo. 5. c. 5 (N.I.)
- Territorial extent: Northern Ireland

Dates
- Royal assent: 7 April 1922
- Commencement: 7 April 1922
- Repealed: 8 August 1973

Other legislation
- Repealed by: Northern Ireland (Emergency Provisions) Act 1973
- Relates to: Public Order Act (Northern Ireland) 1951; Flags and Emblems (Display) Act (Northern Ireland) 1954

Status: Repealed

The Civil Authorities (Special Powers) Act (Northern Ireland) 1922 (12 & 13 Geo. 5. c. 5 (N.I.)), often referred to simply as the Special Powers Act and known as the "Flogging Act", was an act passed by the Parliament of Northern Ireland during the partition of Ireland and shortly after the establishment of Northern Ireland. This act replaced the Restoration of Order in Ireland Act 1920 which permitted the jailing of any Irish person without charge or trial (see Internment).

The act was initially renewed annually; in 1928 it was renewed for five years; it was made permanent by the Civil Authorities (Special Powers) Act (Northern Ireland) 1933 (23 & 24 Geo. 5. c. 12 (N.I.)), and not finally repealed until 1973. Its sweeping powers made it highly controversial, and it was seen by much of the Irish nationalist community as a tool of Ulster unionist oppression. The act was eventually repealed by the Northern Ireland (Emergency Provisions) Act 1973, following the abolition of Northern Ireland's parliament and the imposition of direct rule by the British government.

== Context of act's passage ==
At the start of the twentieth century, the people of Ireland were divided into two mutually hostile factions. The much larger group (nationalists) were mostly Roman Catholic, identified primarily as Irish, and wanted some form of Irish home rule or independence from Britain. The smaller group (unionists), concentrated primarily in the province of Ulster, were mostly Protestant, identified primarily as British (although many saw themselves as Irish and British), and were committed to remaining within the United Kingdom. In the years before World War I, both groups established armed militias intended to enforce their aims and protect their communities from the other side's militias. The British government resolved to partition Ireland in an effort to alleviate unionists and nationalists, with the six most Protestant of the nine counties of Ulster forming Northern Ireland while the rest of Ireland achieved limited self-rule. This was accepted by most unionists as the best deal they were likely to get, but bitterly disappointed many nationalists, especially those who lived in the six counties that became Northern Ireland. Many nationalists on both sides of the border felt that their country had been unjustly divided, and for many decades the Irish government claimed that Northern Ireland was rightfully its territory.

Partition was formally established with the Government of Ireland Act 1920. This also established the Parliament of Northern Ireland, which came into being the following year. Partition was followed by high levels of inter-communal violence, especially in Belfast (see: The Troubles in Ulster (1920–1922)). The Irish Republican Army, although split into pro-treaty and anti-treaty factions, continued to use armed force, aiming to end partition and compel the United Kingdom to withdraw from Northern Ireland.

== The act ==
The act was presented as being necessary to re-establish peace and law and order in Northern Ireland, and enabled the government to 'take all such steps and issue all such orders as may be necessary for preserving the peace and maintaining order', although it was specified that the ordinary course of law should be interfered with as little as possible. The act allowed that trial by jury could be superseded, inquests abolished, curfews imposed, organizations, meetings and newspapers could be banned and the death penalty and flogging could be imposed for the possession of arms. The Home Affairs Minister (Dawson Bates - in office 7 June 1921 – 6 May 1943) was empowered to make any regulation felt necessary to preserve law and order in Northern Ireland. Anyone who broke these regulations could be sentenced to up to a year in prison with hard labour, and in the case of some crimes, whipping. A special summary jurisdiction (court with no jury) was enabled to hear cases involving such crimes. The Home Affairs Minister was also permitted to forbid the holding of inquests if he felt this was required to preserve order and peace.

The schedule to the act specified actions which the government could take in order to preserve peace, although the body of the act enabled the government to take any steps at all which it thought necessary. Actions specified in the Schedule included the closing of licensed premises; the banning in any area of meetings and parades in public places; the closing of roads; the taking of any land or property; and the destruction of any building. The Schedule also forbade the spreading by word of mouth or text any 'reports or... statements intended or likely to cause disaffection to subjects of His Majesty'.

Because it was presented as emergency legislation, the act was initially current only for one year and had to be renewed annually. In 1928, however, it was renewed for five years and when this period expired in 1933 the act was made permanent. According to John Whyte, this happened because, from 1925, nationalist MPs began sitting in the Stormont parliament which they had initially boycotted. Unsurprisingly, they objected strenuously to the renewal of the act, and it was felt by the (Ulster Unionist Party) Minister of Home Affairs that it would be better to make the act permanent than for Parliament annually to 'wrangle' over it.

== Use of the act ==
Despite rhetoric accompanying the act which asserted that it was for the purpose of restoring public order, its provisions continued to be used for the entire period of the Northern Irish parliament's existence. Because the Ulster Unionist Party was the only party ever to form a government in this parliament, the act was used 'almost exclusively on the minority population'. Initially, regulations under the act were used mostly to curb immediate violence and disorder. One of the most controversial of these was internment without trial.

Paragraph 23 of the schedule allowed for the indefinite internment without warrant or trial of 'any person whose behaviour is of such a nature as to give reasonable grounds for suspecting that he has acted or is acting or is about to act in a manner prejudicial to the preservation of the peace or maintenance of order'. The Irish politician Cahir Healy was interned for 18 months in 1922-23 and is quoted on the reasons he was interned:

"All my life I've been a man of peace. It is not therefore, because they feared that I would disturb the peace of Northern Ireland that they dragged me away from my wife and family, but for political reasons. I have been engaged in preparing the case for the inclusion of these areas (Fermanagh and Tyrone) in the Free State. To get me out of the way, local politicians urged my arrest".

In the period from May 1922 to December 1924, 700 republicans were interned under the act. Many of the internees were imprisoned on a British Navy hulk (HMS Argenta) which has been described as a "floating gulag".

Political violence had declined dramatically by 1925, and the government gradually shifted its emphasis from broad measures designed to return civil order to the province to more preventative regulations aimed at suppressing the threat posed by republican aspirations.' Regulations such as internment and the establishment of curfews were used far less, and those such as the banning of meetings and parades, and restrictions on the flying of the Irish tricolour became more common. Between 1922 and 1950, the government banned nearly 100 parades and meetings, the vast majority of which were nationalist or republican. No loyalist gathering was ever directly banned under the act, although a few were caught in blanket bans against parades or meetings in a particular area. From 1922 until 1972, 140 publications were banned, the vast majority of which expressed republican viewpoints. The act was also used against communist publications and recordings. Likewise the vast majority of groups banned under the act were republican; the 1960s incarnation of the Ulster Volunteer Force was the only loyalist group to be made illegal in this way.

After the troubles of the early 1920s had died down, the provision for internment was not used until the IRA's border campaign of the 1950s, in which several hundred republicans were interned. During this time British Labour Party MPs took up the case of the interned Irish Republicans in Northern Ireland. Labour MPs sent a telegram to the Prime Minister of Northern Ireland, Basil Brooke demanding the release of the internees. Some British trade union branches protested against the Special Powers Act and demanded an official inquiry into the administration of Northern Ireland. Following the outbreak of the Troubles in 1968, many within the Protestant community called for the reintroduction of internment. This occurred in 1971 and authorised internment of those suspected to be involved in terrorism. Although there were loyalist as well as republican terrorists at this time, of the 1,981 men interned, only 107 were loyalists. Due to inadequate intelligence-gathering, many of the interned republicans were members of the Official IRA rather than the recently formed Provisional IRA, which was much more heavily involved in military activity at the time.

Internment ended in 1975, but is credited with increasing support and sympathy for the PIRA amongst the Catholic community and outside of Northern Ireland. It helped to create political tensions which culminated in the 1981 Irish Hunger Strike and the death of MP Bobby Sands. Imprisonment under anti-terrorism laws specific to Northern Ireland continued until the 1998 Good Friday Agreement, but these laws required the right to a fair trial be respected.

=== The act and the Army ===
The act encountered further controversy in the 1970s due to the deployment of the Army in Northern Ireland and its role in maintaining order and similar policing-style duties. In 1972, the government was forced to amend the act in order to legalise the detention of internees arrested by soldiers. Martin Meehan had been arrested after escaping from Crumlin Road Jail and charged with escaping from lawful custody. At his trial he successfully argued that, under the Special Powers Act, a soldier had no power of arrest and, as such, he had the legal right to escape, and was awarded £800 in compensation for being illegally detained for twenty-three days.

== Related legislation ==
=== Public Order Act 1951 ===
The Public Order Act (Northern Ireland) 1951 enabled the Home Affairs Minister to ban or re-route any 'non-traditional' procession if it was likely to lead to disorder. It was used primarily against nationalist parades and took over the function of controlling parades and processions from the Special Powers Act.

=== Flags and Emblems (Display) Act ===
The Flags and Emblems (Display) Act (Northern Ireland) 1954 made it an offence to interfere with the display of the Union Jack on private property and enabled the police to remove any other flag if it was likely to cause public disorder. This act was primarily directed against displays of the Irish tricolour, although contrary to popular belief, it did not ban it. This was because it would have been legally very difficult for the Northern Irish government to ban the flag of a sovereign state.

== Bibliography ==
Primary

- Text as passed: "Civil Authorities (Special Powers) Act (Northern Ireland), 1922". CAIN.
- Stormont Commons Hansard Vol.2; debates on bill: c.29 1st r., c.86 2nd r., c.150 Comm., c.246 Report, c.271 3rd r., c.347 c.401 Senate amendments, c.410 assent

Secondary

- Dohonue, Laura K. (1998). "Regulating Northern Ireland: The Special Powers Acts, 1922–1972". The Historical Journal. 41 (4).
- Whyte, John (1983). "How much discrimination was there under the unionist regime, 1921–68?". In Gallagher, Tom; O'Connell, James (eds.). Contemporary Irish Studies. Manchester University Press. ISBN 0-7190-0919-7.
