= Public Order Act (Northern Ireland) 1951 =

Act of the Parliament of Northern Ireland

- Act of Parliament
- Parliament of Northern Ireland
- Long title: An Act to make certain provision with respect to the maintenance of public order and the prevention of disturbance of public meetings, and for purposes connected with the matters aforesaid.
- Citation: 1951 c. 19 (N.I.)
- Territorial extent: Northern Ireland

Dates
- Royal assent: 23 August 1951
Other legislation
Amended by	Public Order (Amendment) Act (Northern Ireland) 1970
Repealed by	Public Order (Northern Ireland) Order 1981
Relates to	Public Meeting Act 1908; Civil Authorities (Special Powers) Act (Northern Ireland) 1922; Flags and Emblems (Display) Act (Northern Ireland) 1954; Public Order (Northern Ireland) Order 1987

Status: Repealed

The Public Order Act (Northern Ireland) 1951 (c. 19 (N.I.)) was an act of the Parliament of Northern Ireland. The act concerned meetings and 'non traditional' parades, although a 1970 amendment considerably broadened the act's scope to include paramilitary groups and weaponry.

== Provisions ==
The first section of the act required any person or persons organising a public procession to give 48 hours' notice to a senior officer of the Royal Ulster Constabulary (RUC). The only exceptions were funeral processions and "public processions which are customarily held along a particular route". Failing to give notice was an offence against the act. Any senior RUC officer who decided that the procession might lead to a breach of the peace or serious public disorder could order the route to be changed.

A Minister of Home Affairs who felt that rerouting would not be sufficient to prevent serious disorder could make an order banning any or all parades in that area.

The act also made it an offence to say or do anything insulting, threatening or abusive at a public meeting or procession; to display anything which would be likely to cause a breach of the peace; or to act in a disorderly manner during a lawful public meeting for the purpose of preventing the purpose of the meeting. Anyone convicted of an offence under the act could be fined up to £500 or be imprisoned for up to two years, depending on which section the offence was under and the nature of the offence.

The original 1951 act exempted processions without specific leaders, though this was amended in 1970.

== Amendment ==
Public Order (Amendment) Act (Northern Ireland) 1970 (Note: Section 9(1).)
- Act of Parliament
- Parliament of Northern Ireland
- Long title: An Act to make further provision for the maintenance of public order and the prevention of disturbance of lawful public processions and public meetings; to prohibit the wearing of uniforms in connection with political objects and the maintenance by private persons of associations of a military or similar character; to prohibit the carrying of offensive weapons in public places without lawful authority or reasonable excuse; and for purposes connected with those matters.
- Citation: 1970 c. 4 (N.I.)
- Territorial extent: Northern Ireland

Dates
- Royal assent: 5 February 1970
Other legislation
Amends	Public Order Act (Northern Ireland) 1951
Amended by	Statute Law Revision (Northern Ireland) Act 1980; Public Order (Northern Ireland) Order 1981; Fines and Penalties (Northern Ireland) Order 1984

Status: Amended

Revised text of statute as amended

Text of the Public Order (Amendment) Act (Northern Ireland) 1970 as in force today (including any amendments) within the United Kingdom, from legislation.gov.uk.

The act was amended by the Public Order (Amendment) Act (Northern Ireland) 1970 (c. 4 (N.I.)) in response to the beginning of the Troubles.

The 1970 act made it an offence to participate in an unlawful procession. The act increased the time before a procession that organisers were required to give to the Royal Ulster Constabulary from 48 hours to 72 hours.

The 1970 act made it an offence to attempt to prevent, hinder or annoy a legal procession. The minister became able to ban a procession or a counter-demonstration. This was in response to increasing counter-demonstrations.

The definition of procession was widened by the 1970 act to include processions of cars.

== Repeal ==
The act was repealed by the Public Order (Northern Ireland) Order 1981 (SI 1981/609), an order in council made by the British government during the period of direct rule. The Public Order (Northern Ireland) Order 1987 (SI 1987/463) removed the "traditional processions" exemption and required all parade organisers to give seven days notice to the RUC.

== Effects ==
The act took over the governance and control of parades in Northern Ireland from the Civil Authorities (Special Powers) Act (Northern Ireland) 1922 (12 & 13 Geo. 5. c. 5 (N.I.)). Although a 'customary' parade was never defined, most commentators agree that the clause exempting these parades privileged Orange Order and other Protestant/loyalist marches, as under the Special Powers Act, they had generally been allowed to go wherever they liked, but nationalist and republican parades had been restricted to Catholic-dominated areas. Although loyalist parades were occasionally banned before the beginning of the Troubles, that was very unusual and tended to do severe career damage to the minister who enacted the ban. Once the Troubles broke out, the act was used to ban all parades in Northern Ireland for several periods from 1969 to 1972. It remained relatively unusual for loyalist parades to be specifically banned, but their rerouting became much more common.

The 1951 act allowed the Royal Ulster Constabulary to significantly restrict displays of the Flag of Ireland.

== See also ==
- Public Order Act
