= Prosecution of Offences Act 1908 =

Act of the Parliament of the United Kingdom

Prosecution of Offences Act 1908 (Note: Section 3(2).)
- Act of Parliament
- Parliament of the United Kingdom
- Long title: An Act to amend the Prosecution of Offences Acts, 1879 and 1884.
- Citation: 8 Edw. 7. c. 3
- Territorial extent: United Kingdom

Dates
- Royal assent: 18 June 1908
- Commencement: 18 June 1908 (Note: The Acts of Parliament (Commencement) Act 1793.)
- Repealed: 4 May 1979
Other legislation
Amends	Prosecution of Offences Act 1879; Prosecution of Offences Act 1884
Repealed by	Statute Law Revision Act 1927; Prosecution of Offences Act 1979

Status: Repealed

Text of statute as originally enacted

The Prosecution of Offences Act 1908 (8 Edw. 7. c. 3) was an act of the Parliament of the United Kingdom passed in 1908.

== Provisions ==
Section 1 of the act repealed section 2 of the Prosecution of Offences Act 1884 (47 & 48 Vict. c. 58), thus splitting the offices of Director of Public Prosecutions and Treasury Solicitor. That section of the 1908 act also removed the upper bar on his salary enacted in the Prosecution of Offences Act 1879 (42 & 43 Vict. c. 2 2) and reiterated the minimum experience of ten years for directors and seven years for his assistants from the 1879 act.

Section 2 of the act made other minor amendments to the 1879 act as well as substituting the director for the Treasury Solicitor in the section of the Coinage (Offences) Act 1861 (24 & 25 Vict. c. 99) relating to the costs of prosecutions.

== Subsequent developments ==
The following enactments were repealed by section 1 of, and the part I of the schedule to, the Statute Law Revision Act 1927 (17 & 18 Geo. 5. c. 42), which came into force on 22 December 1927.

- Section 1, subsection (1), to “ this Act

and.”

- Section 2, subsections (2) and (5).
- Section 3, subsection (1).
- Schedule.

The whole act, so far as unrepealed, was repealed by section 11(2) of, and part II of schedule 2 to, the Prosecution of Offences Act 1979, which came into force on 4 May 1979.
