= Prosecution of Offences Act 1879 =

Act of the Parliament of the United Kingdom

Prosecution of Offences Act 1879 (Note: Section 1.)
- Act of Parliament
- Parliament of the United Kingdom
- Long title: An Act for more effectually providing for the Prosecution of Offences in England, and for other purposes.
- Citation: 42 & 43 Vict. c. 22
- Territorial extent: United Kingdom

Dates
- Royal assent: 3 July 1879
- Commencement: 1 January 1880 (Note: Section 10.)
- Repealed: 4 May 1979
Other legislation
Amended by	Administration of Justice Act 1965
Repealed by	Prosecution of Offences Act 1884; Statute Law Revision Act 1894; Prosecution of Offences Act 1908; Administration of Justice Act 1965; Criminal Procedure (Attendance of Witnesses) Act 1965; Criminal Law Act 1977; Prosecution of Offences Act 1979

Status: Repealed

Text of statute as originally enacted

The Prosecution of Offences Act 1879 (42 & 43 Vict. c. 22) was an act of the Parliament of the United Kingdom. It was one of the Prosecution of Offences Acts 1879 to 1908.

The act established the role of Director of Public Prosecutions at a maximum annual salary of £2,000, reporting to the Attorney General, with up to six assistants. Both director and assistants had to be barristers or solicitors of the Supreme Court of Judicature with a minimum of ten (director) or seven (assistants) years' experience, but were not allowed to practice outside their roles as assistants or Director.

The director's role was to "institute, undertake, or carry on ... similar [criminal] proceedings" at Crown Courts and before magistrates, justices of the peace and sessions of oyer and terminer, as well as advising those involved in such proceedings, such as court clerks and head police officers. It also provided for the Director to force a prosecution if others failed or refused to do so.

The Prosecution of Offences Regulations 1946 (SR&O 1946/1467) (L 17) were made under this act.

== Subsequent developments ==
The whole act, so far as unrepealed, was repealed by section 11(2) of, and part II of schedule 2 to, the Prosecution of Offences Act 1979, which came into force on 4 May 1979.

== Bibliography ==
- "The Prosecution of Offences Act 1879". Halsbury's Statutes of England. Third Edition. Butterworths. London. 1969. Volume 8. Pages 217 to 220.
- "The Prosecution of Offences Act, 1879". Halsbury's Statutes of England. (The Complete Statutes of England). Butterworth & Co (Publishers) Ltd. 1929. Volume 4. Page 696. See also Preliminary Note at page 258, and pages 705, 723, 732, 738 and 739.
- W H Aggs. "The Prosecution of Offences Act, 1879". Chitty's Statutes of Practical Utility. Sixth Edition. Sweet and Maxwell. 1912. Volume 3. Title "Criminal Law". Page 320.
- J M Lely. "The Prosecution of Offences Act, 1879". The Statutes of Practical Utility. (Chitty's Statutes). Fifth Edition. Sweet and Maxwell. Stevens and Sons. Chancery Lane, London. 1894. Volume 3. Title "Criminal Law". Pages 150 to 152.
- J M Lely. "Prosecution of Offences Act, 1879". Chitty's Collection of Statutes of Practical Utility. Fourth Edition. Henry Sweet. Stevens and Sons. Chancery Lane, London. 1880. Volume 2. Title "Criminal Law". Pages 323 to 325.
- The Statutes: Second Revised Edition. 1899. Volume 14: . Page 934.
- W Paterson (ed). "Prosecution of Offences Act, 1879". The Practical Statutes of the Session 1879. Printed by Horace Cox. Law Times Office. Wellington Street, Strand, London. 1879. Pages 65 to 72.
- W Cunningham Glen. "Prosecution of Offences Act, 1879". The Summary Jurisdiction Acts, 1848-1884. Fifth Edition. Shaw and Sons. Fetter Lane, Fleet Street, London. 1884. Pages 444 to 450. Sixth Edition. 1887. Page 470.
- Thomas William Saunders. "The Prosecution of Offences Act". Oke's Magisterial Synopsis. Thirteenth Edition. Butterworths. Fleet Street, London. 1881. Volume 2. Pages 998 to 1003.
- R Henslowe Wellington. "The Prosecution of Offences Act, 1879". The King's Coroner. William Clowes & Sons. 1905. Volume 1. Page 209.
- "A Public Prosecutor" in "Abstracts of Important Acts of Parliament". Companion to the Almanac; or, Year-Book of General Information for 1880. Fifty-Third Year. Printed for the Company of Stationers. London. Pages 239 to 240.
- "Abstract of Statutes 42 and 43 Vict". The Local Government Directory, Almanac and Guide, for the Year 1880. Knight and Co. London. Pages 36 and 37.
- " Loi du 3 Juillet 1879 relative a la poursuite des delits en Angleterre". Annuaire de législation étrangère. Paris. 1880. Volume 9. Pages 13 to 19. Translation into, and notes in, French by Charles Babinet.
