= Local Government (Boundaries) Act 1887 =

Act of the Parliament of the United Kingdom

Local Government (Boundaries) Act 1887 (Note: Section 1.)
- Act of Parliament
- Parliament of the United Kingdom
- Long title: An Act for appointing Commissioners to inquire and report as to the Boundaries of certain Areas of Local Government in England.
- Citation: 50 & 51 Vict. c. 61
- Territorial extent: United Kingdom

Dates
- Royal assent: 16 September 1887
- Commencement: 16 September 1887 (Note: The Acts of Parliament (Commencement) Act 1793.)
- Repealed: 21 December 1908
Other legislation
Repealed by	Statute Law Revision Act 1908

Status: Repealed

Text of statute as originally enacted

The Local Government (Boundaries) Act 1887 (50 & 51 Vict. c. 61) was an act of the Parliament of the United Kingdom. The act established boundary commissioners to reform the areas of administrative bodies in England and Wales in preparation for the creation of elected councils by the Local Government Act 1888 (51 & 52 Vict. c. 41). In the event, the recommendations of the commissioners were not carried out.

== Background ==
By the 1880s the issue of county government had become a major political issue. Both the Liberal and Conservative party manifestos for the 1886 general election contained promises to introduce elected local authorities. Following the election the Conservatives formed an administration led by Lord Salisbury with the support of the breakaway Liberal Unionists. Charles Ritchie became President of the Local Government Board and responsible for carrying forward the reforms. One of the most pressing issues was the necessity of boundary changes: counties in many cases had very irregular boundaries, and the lower-level units such as boroughs, parishes, poor law unions and sanitary districts often lay in more than one county.

== Provisions ==
The act received the royal assent on 16 September 1887. Section 2 of the Act constituted five named persons as The Boundary Commissioners for England and Wales. The commissioners were Earl Brownlow, Lord Edmond Fitzmaurice, Baon Basing, John Selwin-Ibbotsen, Bt, MP and John Tomlinson Hibbert, three of whom formed a quorum.

The commissioners were to proceed, as soon as the Act was passed, to inquire in respect of each county in England and Wales:

- To find the best mode of adjusting boundaries of counties and other local government areas so that no union, borough, sanitary district or parish lay in more than one county.
- To find the best mode of dealing with detached parts of counties.
- To find the best mode for making the boundaries of boroughs and sanitary districts coincide.
- To make administrative arrangements consequential to boundary changes and combination existing areas.

The commissioners were to have "due regard to financial and administrative considerations" in their recommendations. They were permitted to make local inquiries and appoint assistant commissioners to further their work. Their report was to be made to the Local Government Board and laid before parliament.

The area to be reviewed by the commissioners was the whole of England and Wales, except the part under the supervision of the Metropolitan Board of Works. The "counties" to be reviewed were not to include any county of a city or county of a town (also known as a county corporate), but each county, including a riding, division or part for which separate quarter sessions were held.

The commissioners were required to complete their work by 31 December 1888 unless extended by parliament.

== The work of the boundary commissioners ==
It was anticipated that the commissioners would make substantial changes to county boundaries, with counties being formed by groupings of poor law unions which included towns and their rural hinterland. The commissioners were expected to face opposition to altering boundaries that were perceived to date back centuries and mark the limits of ancient entities such as the kingdoms of the heptarchy.

The commissioners divided England and Wales into five areas, with each commissioner taking responsibility for one area. Lord Brownlow took charge of central England, Lord Fitzmaurice: western England and Wales, Lord Basing: southern England, Sir H Selwin-Ibbetson: eastern England while Mr Hibbert was in charge of northern England. The principal commissioners appointed assistant commissioners to carry out detailed enquiries in the various localities and to elicit public opinion. By the end of January 1888, they had carried out three months of enquiries. The bodies concerned were consulted, and not all were opposed to boundary changes, with some making counter-proposals to those of the commissioners.

- The justices of Wiltshire sought extensive territory changes with Berkshire, Gloucestershire, Hampshire and Somerset.
- The Highway Committee of the West Riding of Yorkshire was in favour of taking over parts of Lincolnshire.
- The justices of Flintshire approved a merger with Denbighshire, a move only rejected by the magistrates of the latter county by a single vote.
- The commission's proposal to constitute the borough of Birmingham a county of itself, and to make large extensions to the municipal boundaries were approved by the borough council. The enlarged boundary would take in Aston Manor in Warwickshire and surrounding areas of Worcestershire.
- It was proposed that Cambridgeshire's boundaries should be readjusted to match those of the poor law unions, thus exchanging territory with Huntingdonshire and Hertfordshire. The Cambridgeshire quarter sessions accepted most of the changes, with the exception of those for the south of the county. This would have involved the transfer of 17 parishes in the Royston Union, and the Cambridgeshire part of the town of Royston itself, to Hertfordshire. The Cambridgeshire justices instead called for the Hertfordshire portion of the union to be included in their county.
- A substantial realignment of the boundaries of the Isle of Ely, Norfolk and Suffolk was proposed. The part of Wisbech Union in Norfolk (roughly the hundred of Freebridge Marshland) would be placed in the Isle, while the Suffolk portion of Thetford Union (the Brandon area) would pass to Norfolk.

By March 1888 the commissioners had issued their preliminary schemes to the various local authorities in each county, and local inquiries were to be held to hear objections before the preparation of the final report. The proposed alterations in county boundaries was generally smaller than had been expected. The Liberty of Ripon was to be merged with the North Riding of Yorkshire, and the Soke of Peterborough with Northamptonshire. Adjustments were to be made between the ridings of Yorkshire and between East and West Sussex, while the detached Maelor area of Flintshire was to become part of Denbighshire.

On the issue of towns that were divided by county boundaries, they were to be placed entirely in a single county. Most were to be incorporated in the county in which most of the population lay, but the commissioners made seven recommendations against this rule:

- East Barnet to be entirely in Middlesex
- Filey to be in the North Riding of Yorkshire
- Llandrillo yn Rhos to be in Denbighshire
- Newmarket to be in Cambridgeshire
- Peterborough to be in Huntingdonshire
- Stamford to be in Northamptonshire
- Tamworth to be in Warwickshire

The borough of Dudley, a detached part of Worcestershire, was to be united with the rest of the county by the transfer of an intervening portion of Staffordshire. The act's definition of county as excluding counties of cities and counties of towns caused particular debate over Bristol, the only county corporate which straddled an ancient county boundary (between Gloucestershire and Somerset). The commissioners recommended that despite the act's definition Bristol should be made a separate county for all purposes.

== Parliamentary reaction ==
Even though the commissioners had yet to finish their work it became clear that the government was unwilling to carry out their recommendations. The Local Government Bill passing through parliament was amended with a number of boundary clauses. The effect was that the new county councils would be established on the existing parliamentary counties. Following their election, the new councils were to consider the reports of the Commission and adjust the county boundaries themselves by agreement with the Local Government Board, also establishing the areas for district councils to be elected in January 1890.

The commissioners made their report in August 1888. The report was dismissed by Ritchie, who decried what he saw as the "wholesale destruction of county boundaries" in the recommendations. In particular, he noted that the consequent changes to the boundaries of parliamentary constituencies were likely to be unpopular with MPs, and might lead to the rejection of the Local Government Bill then going through parliament.

Instead, the clauses in the bill creating district councils and requiring boundary alterations were removed, and a section was incorporated that required the relevant county report of the commissioners to be laid before each newly constituted county or county borough council. Each council was to make proposals on boundary alterations in view of the report and forward them to the Local Government Board. In practice, very few changes were made. Four months after the county councils were elected, Lord Balfour of Burleigh, Parliamentary Secretary to the Board of Trade, admitted in the Lords that due to the "time that must necessarily be occupied" by the process, no reports would be ready for approval in that parliamentary session.

== Later changes ==
The question of adjusting county boundaries was revisited in 1894, when the Local Government Act of that year created urban and rural districts. It was admitted that the expected rectification of boundaries in 1889 had not occurred and that the boundaries clauses of the Local Government Act 1888 had proved a "dead letter". The 1894 Act included stronger wording that required county councils to "as soon as practicable" review the county boundaries to ensure that the new districts lay in a single county. Accordingly, there were many alterations over the next few years. It was only after the abolition of poor law unions in 1930 that it was finally possible to rationalise local government areas by county review orders carried out under the Local Government Act 1929.

== Subsequent developments ==
The whole act was repealed by section 1 of, and the schedule to, the Statute Law Revision Act 1908 (8 Edw. 7. c. 49), which came into force on 21 December 1908.
