= HBOS Group Reorganisation Act 2006 =

Local Act of Parliament of the United Kingdom

- Act of Parliament
- Parliament of the United Kingdom
- Long title: An Act to make new provision for the regulation and management of the Governor and Company of the Bank of Scotland upon its registration as a public company under the Companies Act 1985; to provide for the transfer of the undertakings of Capital Bank plc, Halifax plc and HBOS Treasury Services plc to the Governor and Company of the Bank of Scotland; to provide for the transfer of the assets of the Clerical, Medical and General Life Assurance Society to Clerical Medical Investment Group Limited; and for connected purposes.
- Citation: 2006 c. i
- Introduced by: Local act

Dates
- Royal assent: 21 June 2006
- Commencement: 17 September 2007
Other legislation
Repeals/revokes	Bank of Scotland Act 1873; Bank of Scotland Act 1920; Clerical, Medical and General Life Assurance Act 1961; Clerical, Medical and General Life Assurance Act 1974

Status: Current legislation

Text of the HBOS Group Reorganisation Act 2006 as in force today (including any amendments) within the United Kingdom, from legislation.gov.uk.

The HBOS Group Reorganisation Act 2006 (c. i) is a local act of Parliament, passed by the Parliament of the United Kingdom in June 2006. The aim of the act was to provide HBOS plc, a banking and insurance group in the UK, the legal authority to reorganise its subsidiaries into a simplified structure. It came into effect on 17 September 2007.

== Background ==
HBOS plc is a banking and insurance holding company and was created on 10 September 2001 from the merger of the Governor and Company of the Bank of Scotland and Halifax plc.

== See also ==
- Lloyds TSB Act 1998
