= List of acts of the Parliament of the United Kingdom from 1998 =

This is a list of acts of the Parliament of the United Kingdom passed in 1998.

Acts passed since 1963 are cited by calendar year, as opposed to the convention used for earlier acts of citing the regnal year(s) in which the relevant parliamentary session was held. Each act passed in a respective year is given a chapter number (abbreviated "c."), denoted by Arabic numerals in the case of public general acts, lowercase Roman numerals in the case of local acts, or italicised Arabic numerals in the case of personal acts. These run as separate series.

54 acts of Parliament were passed in 1998: 49 public general acts and 5 local acts.

indicates that an act has been transcribed on Wikisource, indicates that an act is available to view at legislation.gov.uk, and indicates the location of the original act in the Parliamentary Archives.

== Public general acts ==
Short title	Citation	Royal assent
Long title
Education (Student Loans) Act 1998 (repealed)	1998 c. 1	27 January 1998
An Act to make further provision with respect to public sector student loans. (Repealed by Teaching and Higher Education Act 1998 (c. 30))
Public Processions (Northern Ireland) Act 1998	1998 c. 2	16 February 1998
An Act to amend the law relating to public processions in Northern Ireland; to provide for the establishment and functions of the Parades Commission for Northern Ireland; and for connected purposes.
Greater London Authority (Referendum) Act 1998	1998 c. 3	23 February 1998
An Act to make provision for the holding of a referendum on the establishment of a Greater London Authority and for expenditure in preparation for such an Authority; and to confer additional functions on the Local Government Commission for England in connection with the establishment of such an Authority.
Consolidated Fund Act 1998 (repealed)	1998 c. 4	18 March 1998
An Act to apply certain sums out of the Consolidated Fund to the service of the years ending on 31st March 1997 and 1998. (Repealed by Consolidated Fund (Appropriation) Act 2000 (c. 9))
Fossil Fuel Levy Act 1998 (repealed)	1998 c. 5	18 March 1998
An Act to amend section 33 of the Electricity Act 1989. (Note: Electricity Act 1989 (c. 29)) (Repealed by Utilities Act 2000 (c. 27))
Wireless Telegraphy Act 1998 (repealed)	1998 c. 6	18 March 1998
An Act to make provision about the grant of, and sums payable in respect of, licences under the Wireless Telegraphy Act 1949 (Note: Wireless Telegraphy Act 1949 (12, 13 & 14 Geo. 6. c. 54)) other than television licences, and about the promotion of the efficient use and management of the electro-magnetic spectrum for wireless telegraphy; and for connected purposes. (Repealed by Wireless Telegraphy Act 2006 (c. 36))
Nuclear Explosions (Prohibition and Inspections) Act 1998	1998 c. 7	18 March 1998
An Act to enable effect to be given to certain provisions of the Comprehensive Nuclear-Test-Ban Treaty adopted in New York on 10th September 1996 and the Protocol to that Treaty; and for connected purposes.
Employment Rights (Dispute Resolution) Act 1998	1998 c. 8	8 April 1998
An Act to rename industrial tribunals and amend the law relating to those tribunals; to amend the law relating to dismissal procedures agreements and other alternative methods of resolving disputes about employment rights; to provide for the adjustment of awards of compensation for unfair dismissal in cases where no use is made of internal procedures for appealing against dismissal; to make provision about cases involving both unfair dismissal and disability discrimination; and for connected purposes.
Northern Ireland (Emergency Provisions) Act 1998 (repealed)	1998 c. 9	8 April 1998
An Act to postpone the expiry and otherwise make amendments of the Northern Ireland (Emergency Provisions) Act 1996; (Note: Northern Ireland (Emergency Provisions) Act 1996 (c. 22)) and for connected purposes. (Repealed by Terrorism Act 2000 (c. 11))
Criminal Procedure (Intermediate Diets) (Scotland) Act 1998	1998 c. 10	8 April 1998
An Act to amend, with retrospective effect, the law in relation to intermediate diets in summary criminal proceedings in Scotland.
Bank of England Act 1998	1998 c. 11	23 April 1998
An Act to make provision about the constitution, regulation, financial arrangements and functions of the Bank of England, including provision for the transfer of supervisory functions; to amend the Banking Act 1987 (Note: Banking Act 1987 (c. 22)) in relation to the provision and disclosure of information; to make provision relating to appointments to the governing body of a designated agency under the Financial Services Act 1986; (Note: Financial Services Act 1986 (c. 60)) to amend Schedule 5 to that Act; to make provision relating to the registration of Government stocks and bonds; to make provision about the application of section 207 of the Companies Act 1989 (Note: Companies Act 1989 (c. 40)) to bearer securities; and for connected purposes.
Northern Ireland (Elections) Act 1998 (repealed)	1998 c. 12	7 May 1998
An Act to make provision for the establishment of the New Northern Ireland Assembly and for the election of its members. (Repealed by Northern Ireland Act 1998 (c. 47))
Animal Health (Amendment) Act 1998	1998 c. 13	21 May 1998
An Act to improve the welfare of animals in quarantine; and for connected purposes.
Social Security Act 1998	1998 c. 14	21 May 1998
An Act to make provision as to the making of decisions and the determination of appeals under enactments relating to social security, child support, vaccine damage payments and war pensions; to make further provision with respect to social security; and for connected purposes.
Magistrates' Courts (Procedure) Act 1998	1998 c. 15	21 May 1998
An Act to amend sections 12 and 13 of the Magistrates' Courts Act 1980; (Note: Magistrates' Courts Act 1980 (c. 43)) to make further provision, in relation to certain criminal proceedings in magistrates' courts, about the proof of previous convictions and orders; and for connected purposes.
Tax Credits (Initial Expenditure) Act 1998 (repealed)	1998 c. 16	21 May 1998
An Act to authorise the incurring of expenditure in connection with the replacement of certain social security benefits with income tax credits. (Repealed by Tax Credits Act 2002 (c. 21))
Petroleum Act 1998	1998 c. 17	11 June 1998
An Act to consolidate certain enactments about petroleum, offshore installations and submarine pipelines.
Audit Commission Act 1998 (repealed)	1998 c. 18	11 June 1998
An Act to consolidate Part III of the Local Government Finance Act 1982 (Note: Local Government Finance Act 1982 (c. 32)) and other enactments relating to the Audit Commission for Local Authorities and the National Health Service in England and Wales. (Repealed by Local Audit and Accountability Act 2014 (c. 2))
Community Care (Residential Accommodation) Act 1998	1998 c. 19	11 June 1998
An Act to restrict the amount of a person's capital which may be taken into account by a local authority in determining whether he should be provided with residential accommodation that would be, or would be treated as, provided under Part III of the National Assistance Act 1948. (Note: National Assistance Act 1948 (11 & 12 Geo. 6. c. 29))
Late Payment of Commercial Debts (Interest) Act 1998	1998 c. 20	11 June 1998
An Act to make provision with respect to interest on the late payment of certain debts arising under commercial contracts for the supply of goods or services; and for connected purposes.
European Communities (Amendment) Act 1998 (repealed)	1998 c. 21	11 June 1998
An Act to make provision consequential on the Treaty signed at Amsterdam on 2nd October 1997 amending the Treaty on European Union, the Treaties establishing the European Communities and certain related Acts. (Repealed by European Union (Withdrawal) Act 2018 (Consequential Modifications and Repeals and Revocations) (EU Exit) Regulations 2019 (SI 2019/628))
National Lottery Act 1998	1998 c. 22	2 July 1998
An Act to make further provision in relation to the National Lottery; to make provision for and in connection with the establishment of a body corporate to be endowed out of the National Lottery Distribution Fund and to be known as the National Endowment for Science, Technology and the Arts; and for connected purposes.
Public Interest Disclosure Act 1998	1998 c. 23	2 July 1998
An Act to protect individuals who make certain disclosures of information in the public interest; to allow such individuals to bring action in respect of victimisation; and for connected purposes.
Road Traffic Reduction (National Targets) Act 1998	1998 c. 24	2 July 1998
An Act to make further provision for road traffic reduction targets; and for related purposes.
Registered Establishments (Scotland) Act 1998 (repealed)	1998 c. 25	9 July 1998
An Act to add to the classes of establishment which require to be registered under section 61 of the Social Work (Scotland) Act 1968; (Note: Social Work (Scotland) Act 1968 (c. 49)) and for connected purposes. (Repealed by Regulation of Care (Scotland) Act 2001 (asp 8))
Pesticides Act 1998	1998 c. 26	9 July 1998
An Act to amend the Food and Environment Protection Act 1985 (Note: Food and Environment Protection Act 1985 (c. 48)) in respect of the powers to make regulations concerning pesticides and in respect of the enforcement of provisions relating to the control of pesticides.
Criminal Justice (International Co-operation) (Amendment) Act 1998	1998 c. 27	9 July 1998
An Act to amend section 12 of the Criminal Justice (International Co-operation) Act 1990. (Note: Criminal Justice (International Co-operation) Act 1990 (c. 5))
Appropriation Act 1998 (repealed)	1998 c. 28	16 July 1998
An Act to apply a sum out of the Consolidated Fund to the service of the year ending on 31st March 1999; to appropriate the supplies granted in this Session of Parliament; and to repeal certain Consolidated Fund and Appropriation Acts. (Repealed by Consolidated Fund (Appropriation) Act 2000 (c. 9))
Data Protection Act 1998 (repealed)	1998 c. 29	16 July 1998
An Act to make new provision for the regulation of the processing of information relating to individuals, including the obtaining, holding, use or disclosure of such information. (Repealed by Data Protection Act 2018 (c. 12))
Teaching and Higher Education Act 1998	1998 c. 30	16 July 1998
An Act to make provision for the establishment of General Teaching Councils for England and Wales and with respect to the registration, qualifications and training of teachers and the inspection of such training; to make new provision with respect to grants and loans to students in higher or further education and fees payable by them; to make provision with respect to the funding of higher education institutions and certain further education, and other matters relating to further and higher education institutions; to enable the higher and further education funding councils in Scotland to discharge certain functions jointly; to enable young persons to have time off work for study or training; to make provision with respect to the inspection of training and careers services provided in pursuance of arrangements or directions under the Employment and Training Act 1973; (Note: Employment and Training Act 1973 (c. 50)) to provide that the Scottish Further Education Funding Council shall be a relevant body for the purposes of section 19(5) of the Disability Discrimination Act 1995; (Note: Disability Discrimination Act 1995 (c. 50)) and for connected purposes.
School Standards and Framework Act 1998	1998 c. 31	24 July 1998
An Act to make new provision with respect to school education and the provision of nursery education otherwise than at school; to enable arrangements to be made for the provision of further education for young persons partly at schools and partly at further education institutions; to make provision with respect to the Education Assets Board; and for connected purposes.
Police (Northern Ireland) Act 1998	1998 c. 32	24 July 1998
An Act to make provision about policing in Northern Ireland; and for connected purposes.
Landmines Act 1998	1998 c. 33	28 July 1998
An Act to promote the control of anti-personnel landmines; and for connected purposes.
Private Hire Vehicles (London) Act 1998	1998 c. 34	28 July 1998
An Act to provide for the licensing and regulation of private hire vehicles, and drivers and operators of such vehicles, within the metropolitan police district and the City of London; and for connected purposes.
Northern Ireland (Sentences) Act 1998	1998 c. 35	28 July 1998
An Act to make provision about the release on licence of certain persons serving sentences of imprisonment in Northern Ireland.
Finance Act 1998	1998 c. 36	31 July 1998
An Act to grant certain duties, to alter other duties, and to amend the law relating to the National Debt and the Public Revenue, and to make further provision in connection with Finance.
Crime and Disorder Act 1998	1998 c. 37	31 July 1998
An Act to make provision for preventing crime and disorder; to create certain racially-aggravated offences; to abolish the rebuttable presumption that a child is doli incapax and to make provision as to the effect of a child's failure to give evidence at his trial; to abolish the death penalty for treason and piracy; to make changes to the criminal justice system; to make further provision for dealing with offenders; to make further provision with respect to remands and committals for trial and the release and recall of prisoners; to amend Chapter I of Part II of the Crime (Sentences) Act 1997 (Note: Crime (Sentences) Act 1997 (c. 43)) and to repeal Chapter I of Part III of the Crime and Punishment (Scotland) Act 1997; (Note: Crime and Punishment (Scotland) Act 1997 (c. 48)) to make amendments designed to facilitate, or otherwise desirable in connection with, the consolidation of certain enactments; and for connected purposes.
Government of Wales Act 1998	1998 c. 38	31 July 1998
An Act to establish and make provision about the National Assembly for Wales and the offices of Auditor General for Wales and Welsh Administration Ombudsman; to reform certain Welsh public bodies and abolish certain other Welsh public bodies; and for connected purposes.
National Minimum Wage Act 1998	1998 c. 39	31 July 1998
An Act to make provision for and in connection with a national minimum wage; to provide for the amendment of certain enactments relating to the remuneration of persons employed in agriculture; and for connected purposes.
Criminal Justice (Terrorism and Conspiracy) Act 1998	1998 c. 40	4 September 1998
An Act to make provision about procedure and forfeiture in relation to offences concerning proscribed organisations, and about conspiracy to commit offences outside the United Kingdom.
Competition Act 1998	1998 c. 41	9 November 1998
An Act to make provision about competition and the abuse of a dominant position in the market; to confer powers in relation to investigations conducted in connection with Article 85 or 86 of the treaty establishing the European Community; to amend the Fair Trading Act 1973 (Note: Fair Trading Act 1973 (c. 41)) in relation to information which may be required in connection with investigations under that Act; to make provision with respect to the meaning of "supply of services" in the Fair Trading Act 1973; and for connected purposes.
Human Rights Act 1998	1998 c. 42	9 November 1998
An Act to give further effect to rights and freedoms guaranteed under the European Convention on Human Rights; to make provision with respect to holders of certain judicial offices who become judges of the European Court of Human Rights; and for connected purposes.
Statute Law (Repeals) Act 1998	1998 c. 43	19 November 1998
An Act to promote the reform of the statute law by the repeal, in accordance with recommendations of the Law Commission and the Scottish Law Commission, of certain enactments which (except in so far as their effect is preserved) are no longer of practical utility, and to make other provision in connection with the repeal of those enactments.
Waste Minimisation Act 1998	1998 c. 44	19 November 1998
An Act to enable certain local authorities to make arrangements to minimise the generation of waste in their area; and for related purposes.
Regional Development Agencies Act 1998	1998 c. 45	19 November 1998
An Act to make provision for regional development agencies in England; to make provision about the Development Commission and the Urban Regeneration Agency; and for connected purposes.
Scotland Act 1998	1998 c. 46	19 November 1998
An Act to provide for the establishment of a Scottish Parliament and Administration and other changes in the government of Scotland; to provide for changes in the constitution and functions of certain public authorities; to provide for the variation of the basic rate of income tax in relation to income of Scottish taxpayers in accordance with a resolution of the Scottish Parliament; to amend the law about parliamentary constituencies in Scotland; and for connected purposes.
Northern Ireland Act 1998	1998 c. 47	19 November 1998
An Act to make new provision for the government of Northern Ireland for the purpose of implementing the agreement reached at multi-party talks on Northern Ireland set out in Command Paper 3883. (Note: Cmd 3883 was the Belfast Agreement.)
Registration of Political Parties Act 1998	1998 c. 48	19 November 1998
An Act to make provision about the registration of political parties.
Consolidated Fund (No. 2) Act 1998 (repealed)	1998 c. 49	17 December 1998
An Act to apply certain sums out of the Consolidated Fund to the service of the years ending on 31st March 1999 and 2000. (Repealed by Consolidated Fund (Appropriation) Act 2000 (c. 9))

== Local acts ==
Short title	Citation	Royal assent
Long title
Tyne Tunnels Act 1998	1998 c. i	8 April 1998
An Act to amend provisions of the Tyne and Wear Act 1976 (Note: Tyne and Wear Act 1976 (c. xxxvi)) concerning tolls in relation to the Tyne Tunnels; to confer further powers upon the Tyne and Wear Passenger Transport Authority to facilitate the provision and operation of an additional tunnel crossing of the river Tyne; to enable provision to be made for the operation of the existing tunnels in conjunction with such a new crossing; and for connected purposes.
Shrewsbury and Atcham Borough Council Act 1998	1998 c. ii	16 July 1998
An Act to make further provision for the regulation and protection of part of the Square in the borough of Shrewsbury and Atcham; and for other purposes.
City of Edinburgh (Guided Busways) Order Confirmation Act 1998	1998 c. iii	28 July 1998
An Act to confirm a Provisional Order under the Private Legislation Procedure (Scotland) Act 1936, (Note: Private Legislation Procedure (Scotland) Act 1936 (26 Geo. 5 & 1 Edw. 8. c. 52)) relating to City of Edinburgh (Guided Busways).
	City of Edinburgh (Guided Busways) Order 1998 Provisional Order to authorise The City of Edinburgh Council to develop guided busways between Edinburgh airport and the city centre of Edinburgh for the provision of guided vehicle services; to authorise the construction of works and the purchase of lands; to confer further powers on the Council; and for other purposes.	
Tamar Bridge Act 1998	1998 c. iv	28 July 1998
An Act to empower the Cornwall County Council and the Plymouth City Council ("the Authorities") to strengthen, widen and improve the bridge across the river Tamar authorised by the Tamar Bridge Act 1957 (Note: Tamar Bridge Act 1957 (5 & 6 Eliz. 2. c. xxviii)) and to acquire land; to confer further powers on the Authorities; to make further provision with respect to the undertaking of the Authorities established under that Act and to amend that Act; and for other purposes.
Lloyds TSB Act 1998	1998 c. v	31 July 1998
An Act to provide for the transfer to and vesting in Lloyds Bank Plc of the undertakings of TSB Bank plc and Hill Samuel Bank Limited; and for connected purposes.

== See also ==
- List of acts of the Parliament of the United Kingdom
