= Lloyds TSB Act 1998 =

Act of Parliament of the United Kingdom

- Act of Parliament
- Parliament of the United Kingdom
- Long title: An Act to provide for the transfer to and vesting in Lloyds Bank Plc of the undertakings of TSB Bank plc and Hill Samuel Bank Limited; and for connected purposes.
- Citation: 1998 c. v

Dates
- Royal assent: 31 July 1998
- Commencement: 28 June 1999

Status: Current legislation

Text of statute as originally enacted

The Lloyds TSB Act 1998 (c. v) is a local act of the United Kingdom Parliament, to provide for the transfer to and vesting in Lloyds Bank plc of the undertakings of TSB Bank plc and Hill Samuel Bank Limited (members of the Lloyds TSB Group); and for connected purposes.

== Background ==
The Lloyds TSB merger was structured as a reverse takeover; Lloyds Bank Plc was delisted from the London Stock Exchange and TSB Group plc was renamed Lloyds TSB Group plc on 28 December 1995, with former Lloyds Bank shareholders owning a 70 per cent equity interest in the share capital, effected through a scheme of arrangement.

== Objectives ==
The new bank commenced trading in 1999, after the statutory process of integration was completed. On 28 June, TSB Bank plc transferred engagements to Lloyds Bank plc which then changed its name to Lloyds TSB Bank plc; at the same time, TSB Bank Scotland plc absorbed Lloyds' three Scottish branches becoming Lloyds TSB Scotland plc.

This coincided with a new corporate identity and advertising campaign launched by the bank that year, which saw the introduction of a revised version of the Lloyds Bank black horse (placed upon a background combining the Lloyds green and TSB blue color schemes) as the combined bank's new logo, and the adoption of the new slogan "Your Life, Your Bank".

== See also ==
- HBOS Group Reorganisation Act 2006
