= List of acts of the Parliament of the United Kingdom from 1887 =

This is a complete list of acts of the Parliament of the United Kingdom for the year 1887.

Note that the first parliament of the United Kingdom was held in 1801; parliaments between 1707 and 1800 were either parliaments of Great Britain or of Ireland). For acts passed up until 1707, see the list of acts of the Parliament of England and the list of acts of the Parliament of Scotland. For acts passed from 1707 to 1800, see the list of acts of the Parliament of Great Britain. See also the list of acts of the Parliament of Ireland.

For acts of the devolved parliaments and assemblies in the United Kingdom, see the list of acts of the Scottish Parliament, the list of acts of the Northern Ireland Assembly, and the list of acts and measures of Senedd Cymru; see also the list of acts of the Parliament of Northern Ireland.

The number shown after each act's title is its chapter number. Acts passed before 1963 are cited using this number, preceded by the year(s) of the reign during which the relevant parliamentary session was held; thus the Union with Ireland Act 1800 is cited as "39 & 40 Geo. 3 c. 67", meaning the 67th act passed during the session that started in the 39th year of the reign of George III and which finished in the 40th year of that reign. Note that the modern convention is to use Arabic numerals in citations (thus "41 Geo. 3" rather than "41 Geo. III"). Acts of the last session of the Parliament of Great Britain and the first session of the Parliament of the United Kingdom are both cited as "41 Geo. 3". Acts passed from 1963 onwards are simply cited by calendar year and chapter number.

All modern acts have a short title, e.g. the Local Government Act 2003. Some earlier acts also have a short title given to them by later acts, such as by the Short Titles Act 1896.

== 50 & 51 Vict. ==
The second session of the 24th Parliament of the United Kingdom, which met from 27 January 1887 until 16 September 1887.

=== Public general acts ===
Short title	Citation	Royal assent
Long title
Consolidated Fund (No. 1) Act 1887 (repealed)	50 & 51 Vict. c. 1	29 March 1887
An Act to apply certain sums out of the Consolidated Fund to the service of the years ending on the thirty-first day of March one thousand eight hundred and eighty-seven and one thousand eight hundred and eighty-eight. (Repealed by Statute Law Revision Act 1908 (8 Edw. 7. c. 49))
Army (Annual) Act 1887 (repealed)	50 & 51 Vict. c. 2	28 April 1887
An Act to provide, during twelve months, for the Discipline and Regulation of the Army. (Repealed by Statute Law Revision Act 1908 (8 Edw. 7. c. 49) and Revision of the Army and Air Force Acts (Transitional Provisions) Act 1955 (3 & 4 Eliz. 2. c. 20))
County Courts (Expenses) Act 1887 (repealed)	50 & 51 Vict. c. 3	28 April 1887
An Act to amend the Acts relating to County Courts so far as regards the payment of certain expenses connected with County Courts. (Repealed by County Courts Act 1888 (51 & 52 Vict. c. 43))
Merchant Shipping (Fishing Boats) Act 1887 (repealed)	50 & 51 Vict. c. 4	28 April 1887
An Act to amend the provisions of the Merchant Shipping (Fishing Boats) Acts. (Repealed by Merchant Shipping Act 1894 (57 & 58 Vict. c. 60))
Isle of Man (Customs) Act 1887 (repealed)	50 & 51 Vict. c. 5	28 April 1887
An Act to amend the law respecting the Customs Duties of the Isle of Man. (Repealed by Isle of Man Act 1958 (6 & 7 Eliz. 2. c. 11))
Supreme Court of Judicature (Ireland) Act 1887 (repealed)	50 & 51 Vict. c. 6	23 May 1887
An Act to amend the Supreme Court of Judicature Act (Ireland), 1877. (Note: Supreme Court of Judicature Act (Ireland) 1877 (40 & 41 Vict. c. 57)) (Repealed by Judicature (Northern Ireland) Act 1978 (c. 23))
Customs Consolidation Act 1876, Amendment Act 1887 (repealed)	50 & 51 Vict. c. 7	23 May 1887
An Act to amend the Customs Consolidation Act, 1876. (Note: Customs Consolidation Act 1876 (39 & 40 Vict. c. 36)) (Repealed by Customs and Excise Act 1952 (15 & 16 Geo. 6 & 1 Eliz. 2. c. 44))
Incumbents of Benefices Loans Extension Act 1886, Amendment Act 1887 (repealed)	50 & 51 Vict. c. 8	23 May 1887
An Act to amend the Incumbents of Benefices Loans Extension Act, 1886. (Note: Incumbents of Benefices Loans Extension Act 1886 (49 & 50 Vict. c. 34)) (Repealed by Statute Law Revision Act 1908 (8 Edw. 7. c. 49))
Police Disabilities Removal Act 1887 (repealed)	50 & 51 Vict. c. 9	23 May 1887
An Act to remove the Disabilities of the Police to vote at Parliamentary Elections. (Repealed by Representation of the People Act 1948 (11 & 12 Geo. 6. c. 65))
Duke of Connaught's Leave Act 1887 (repealed)	50 & 51 Vict. c. 10	23 May 1887
An Act to enable His Royal Highness the Duke of Connaught to return to England for a limited time for the purpose of being present at the celebration of Her Majesty’s Jubilee without thereby resigning his command in Bombay. (Repealed by Statute Law Revision Act 1908 (8 Edw. 7. c. 49))
Conversion of India Stock Act 1887 (repealed)	50 & 51 Vict. c. 11	23 May 1887
An Act for giving facilities for the conversion of India Four per Cent. Stock into India Three and a half per Cent. Stock, and for other purposes relating thereto. (Repealed by Statute Law Revision Act 1964 (c. 79))
Truro Bishopric and Chapter Acts Amendment Act 1887 (repealed)	50 & 51 Vict. c. 12	5 July 1887
An Act to amend the Bishopric of Truro Act, 1876, (Note: Bishopric of Truro Act 1876 (39 & 40 Vict. c. 54)) and the Truro Chapter Act, 1878. (Note: Truro Chapter Act 1878 (41 & 42 Vict. c. 44)) (Repealed by Truro Cathedral Measure 1959 (No. 1))
Pensions (Colonial Service) Act 1887 (repealed)	50 & 51 Vict. c. 13	5 July 1887
An Act to extend, in certain cases, the provisions of the Superannuation Act, 1859, (Note: Superannuation Act 1859 (22 Vict. c. 26)) and to extend and otherwise amend the provisions of the Colonial Governors (Pensions) Acts, 1865 (Note: Colonial Governors (Pensions) Act 1865 (28 & 29 Vict. c. 113)) and 1872. (Note: Colonial Governors (Pensions) Act 1872 (35 & 36 Vict. c. 29)) (Repealed by Superannuation (Amendment) Act 1965 (c. 10))
Consolidated Fund (No. 2) Act 1887 (repealed)	50 & 51 Vict. c. 14	5 July 1887
An Act to apply the sum of thirteen million six hundred and seventy-five thousand six hundred and fifty-nine pounds out of the Consolidated Fund to the service of the year ending on the thirty-first day of March one thousand eight hundred and eighty-eight. (Repealed by Statute Law Revision Act 1908 (8 Edw. 7. c. 49))
Customs and Inland Revenue Act 1887 (repealed)	50 & 51 Vict. c. 15	5 July 1887
An Act to grant certain Duties of Customs and Inland Revenue, to alter other duties, and to amend the laws relating to Inland Revenue. (Repealed by Customs and Excise Act 1952 (15 & 16 Geo. 6 & 1 Eliz. 2. c. 44))
National Debt and Local Loans Act 1887 (repealed)	50 & 51 Vict. c. 16	12 July 1887
An Act to amend the law respecting the National Debt and the charge thereof on the Consolidated Fund, and to make further provision respecting Local Loans. (Repealed by National Loans Act 1968 (c. 13))
Metropolis Management (Battersea and Westminster) Act 1887 (repealed)	50 & 51 Vict. c. 17	12 July 1887
An Act to amend the Metropolis Management Acts. (Repealed by Statute Law Revision Act 1908 (8 Edw. 7. c. 49))
Trusts (Scotland) Act 1867 Amendment Act 1887 (repealed)	50 & 51 Vict. c. 18	12 July 1887
An Act to amend the Trusts (Scotland) Act, 1867. (Note: Trusts (Scotland) Act 1867 (30 & 31 Vict. c. 97)) (Repealed by Trusts (Scotland) Act 1921 (11 & 12 Geo. 5. c. 58))
Quarry (Fencing) Act 1887 (repealed)	50 & 51 Vict. c. 19	19 July 1887
An Act to provide for the Fencing of Quarries. (Repealed by Mines and Quarries Act 1954 (2 & 3 Eliz. 2. c. 70))
Criminal Law and Procedure (Ireland) Act 1887 or the Crimes Act 1887 or the Irish Crimes Act 1887 or the Perpetual Crimes Act 1887 or the Jubilee Coercion Act 1887 (repealed)	50 & 51 Vict. c. 20	19 July 1887
An Act to make better provision for the prevention and punishment of Crime in Ireland, and for other purposes relating thereto. (Repealed by Northern Ireland (Emergency Provisions) (Amendment) Act 1975 (c. 62))
Water Companies (Regulation of Powers) Act 1887 (repealed)	50 & 51 Vict. c. 21	8 August 1887
An Act to limit the Powers of the Water Companies to cut off the Tenants Water Supply where the rate is paid by the landlord. (Repealed by Water Act 1945 (8 & 9 Geo. 6. c. 42))
Public Libraries Acts Amendment Act 1887 (repealed)	50 & 51 Vict. c. 22	8 August 1887
An Act to amend the Public Libraries Acts. (Repealed by Public Libraries Act 1892 (55 & 56 Vict. c. 53))
Incumbents' Resignation Act 1871 Amendment Act 1887 (repealed)	50 & 51 Vict. c. 23	8 August 1887
An Act to amend the Incumbents Resignation Act, 1871. (Note: Incumbents Resignation Act 1871 (34 & 35 Vict. c. 44)) (Repealed by Clergy Pensions Measure 1961 (No. 3))
Crofters Holdings (Scotland) Act 1887	50 & 51 Vict. c. 24	8 August 1887
An Act to amend the Crofters Holdings (Scotland) Act, 1886. (Note: Crofters Holdings (Scotland) Act 1886 (49 & 50 Vict. c. 29))
Probation of First Offenders Act 1887 (repealed)	50 & 51 Vict. c. 25	8 August 1887
An Act to permit the conditional Release of First Offenders in certain cases. (Repealed by Probation of Offenders Act 1907 (7 Edw. 7. c. 17))
Allotments and Cottage Gardens Compensation for Crops Act 1887 (repealed)	50 & 51 Vict. c. 26	8 August 1887
An Act to provide Compensation to the Occupiers of Allotments and Cottage Gardens for crops left in the ground at the end of their tenancies. (Repealed by Allotments Act 1922 (12 & 13 Geo. 5. c. 51))
Markets and Fairs (Weighing of Cattle) Act 1887	50 & 51 Vict. c. 27	8 August 1887
An Act to amend the Law with respect to weighing Cattle in Markets and Fairs.
Merchandise Marks Act 1887 (repealed)	50 & 51 Vict. c. 28	23 August 1887
An Act to consolidate and amend the Law relating to Fraudulent Marks on Merchandise. (Repealed by Trade Descriptions Act 1968 (c. 29))
Margarine Act 1887 (repealed)	50 & 51 Vict. c. 29	23 August 1887
An Act for the better Prevention of the Fraudulent Sale of Margarine. (Repealed for England and Wales and Scotland by Food and Drugs (Adulteration) Act 1928 (18 & 19 Geo. 5. c. 31) and for Northern Ireland by Food and Drugs Act (Northern Ireland) 1958 (c. 27 (N.I.)))
Settled Land Acts (Amendment) Act 1887	50 & 51 Vict. c. 30	23 August 1887
An Act to amend the Settled Land Act (1882). (Note: Settled Land Act 1882 (45 & 46 Vict. c. 38)) (Repealed for England and Wales by Settled Land Act 1925 (15 & 16 Geo. 5. c. 18))
Metropolitan Board of Works (Money) Act 1887 (repealed)	50 & 51 Vict. c. 31	23 August 1887
An Act further to amend the Acts relating to the raising of Money by the Metropolitan Board of Works; and for other purposes. (Repealed by London County Council (Finance Consolidation) Act 1912 (2 & 3 Geo. 5. c. cv))
Open Spaces Act 1887 (repealed)	50 & 51 Vict. c. 32	23 August 1887
An Act for extending certain Provisions of the Metropolitan Open Spaces Acts, 1877 (Note: Metropolitan Open Spaces Act 1877 (40 & 41 Vict. c. 35)) and 1881, (Note: Metropolitan Open Spaces Act 1881 (44 & 45 Vict. c. 34)) with Amendments, to Sanitary Districts throughout England, Wales, and Ireland; and for other purposes. (Repealed by Statute Law (Repeals) Act 1993 (c. 50))
Land Law (Ireland) Act 1887	50 & 51 Vict. c. 33	23 August 1887
An Act to amend the Land Law (Ireland) Act, 1881, (Note: Land Law (Ireland) Act 1881 (44 & 45 Vict. c. 49)) and the Purchase of Land (Ireland) Act, 1885, (Note: Purchase of Land (Ireland) Act 1885 (48 & 49 Vict. c. 73)) and for other purposes connected therewith.
London Parks and Works Act 1887 (repealed)	50 & 51 Vict. c. 34	23 August 1887
An Act for the transfer to the Metropolitan Board of Works and the maintenance of certain Public Parks and Works in the Metropolis. (Repealed by Local Law (Greater London Council and Inner London Boroughs) Order 1965 (SI 1965/540))
Criminal Procedure (Scotland) Act 1887 (repealed)	50 & 51 Vict. c. 35	16 September 1887
An Act to simplify and amend the Criminal Law of Scotland and its Procedure and to alter the Constitution of the Justiciary and Sheriff Courts in Scotland. (Repealed by Criminal Procedure (Consequential Provisions) (Scotland) Act 1995 (c. 40))
Lieutenancy Clerks Allowances Act 1887 (repealed)	50 & 51 Vict. c. 36	16 September 1887
An Act for amending the Allowances payable to Clerks of General Meetings of Lieutenancy. (Repealed by Statute Law Revision Act 1950 (14 Geo. 6. c. 6))
Public Works Loans Act 1887 (repealed)	50 & 51 Vict. c. 37	16 September 1887
An Act to grant money for the purpose of certain Local Loans; and for other purposes relating to Local Loans. (Repealed by Merchant Shipping (Mercantile Marine Fund) Act 1898 (61 & 62 Vict. c. 44), Statute Law Revision Act 1908 (8 Edw. 7. c. 49) and Statute Law (Repeals) Act 2004 (c. 14))
Public-houses, Hours of Closing (Scotland) Act 1887 (repealed)	50 & 51 Vict. c. 38	16 September 1887
An Act to provide for the earlier closing of premises licensed for the sale of Exciseable Liquors in Scotland. (Repealed by Licensing (Scotland) Act 1903 (3 Edw. 7. c. 25))
Lunacy Districts (Scotland) Act 1887 (repealed)	50 & 51 Vict. c. 39	16 September 1887
An Act to make provision for altering and varying Lunacy Districts in Scotland. (Repealed by National Health Service (Scotland) Act 1947 (10 & 11 Geo. 6. c. 27))
Savings Banks Act 1887	50 & 51 Vict. c. 40	16 September 1887
An Act to amend the Acts relating to Savings Banks and to the Purchase of Small Government Annuities, and to assuring Payments of Money after Death.
Sheriff of Lanarkshire Act 1887 (repealed)	50 & 51 Vict. c. 41	16 September 1887
An Act to remove doubts as to the appointment of the Sheriff of Lanarkshire, and to confirm the same. (Repealed by Statute Law Revision Act 1908 (8 Edw. 7. c. 49))
Public Libraries Consolidation (Scotland) Act 1887	50 & 51 Vict. c. 42	16 September 1887
An Act to amend and consolidate the Public Libraries (Scotland) Acts.
Stannaries Act 1887 (repealed)	50 & 51 Vict. c. 43	16 September 1887
An Act to amend the Stannaries Act, 1869, (Note: Stannaries Act 1869 (32 & 33 Vict. c. 19)) and for other purposes relating thereto. (Repealed by Statute Law (Repeals) Act 1998 (c. 43))
Trinidad and Tobago Act 1887 (repealed)	50 & 51 Vict. c. 44	16 September 1887
An Act to enable Her Majesty by Order in Council to unite the Colonies of Trinidad and Tobago into one Colony. (Repealed by West Indies Act 1962 (10 & 11 Eliz. 2. c. 19))
Metropolitan Police Act 1887	50 & 51 Vict. c. 45	16 September 1887
An Act for further amending the Enactments relating to Offices, Stations, and Buildings for the Metropolitan Police Force.
Truck Amendment Act 1887 or the Truck Act 1887 (repealed)	50 & 51 Vict. c. 46	16 September 1887
An Act to amend and extend the Law relating to Truck. (Repealed by Wages Act 1986 (c. 48))
Trustee Savings Banks Act 1887 (repealed)	50 & 51 Vict. c. 47	16 September 1887
An Act to provide for examination into the affairs of Trustee Savings Banks, and to remove doubts as to the Law relating to the winding-up of such Banks. (Repealed by Trustee Savings Banks Act 1954 (2 & 3 Eliz. 2. c. 63))
Allotments Act 1887 (repealed)	50 & 51 Vict. c. 48	16 September 1887
An Act to facilitate the provision of Allotments for the Labouring Classes. (Repealed by Statute Law Revision Act 1966 (c. 5))
Charitable Trusts Act 1887 (repealed)	50 & 51 Vict. c. 49	16 September 1887
An Act to amend the Charitable Trusts Acts, 1853 to 1869, so far as respects the officers of the Charity Commissioners for England and Wales and the Official Trustees acting under those Commissioners. (Repealed by Charities Act 1960 (8 & 9 Eliz. 2. c. 58))
Appropriation Act 1887 (repealed)	50 & 51 Vict. c. 50	16 September 1887
An Act to apply a sum out of the Consolidated Fund to the service of the year ending on the thirty-first day of March one thousand eight hundred and eighty-eight, and to appropriate the Supplies granted in this Session of Parliament. (Repealed by Statute Law Revision Act 1908 (8 Edw. 7. c. 49))
Valuation of Lands (Scotland) Amendment Act 1887 (repealed)	50 & 51 Vict. c. 51	16 September 1887
An Act to amend the Valuation of Lands (Scotland) Amendment Act, 1867. (Note: Valuation of Lands (Scotland) Amendment Act 1867 (30 & 31 Vict. c. 80)) (Repealed by Statute Law (Repeals) Act 1976 (c. 16))
Secretary for Scotland Act 1887	50 & 51 Vict. c. 52	16 September 1887
An Act to amend the Secretary for Scotland Act 1885.
Escheat (Procedure) Act 1887 (repealed)	50 & 51 Vict. c. 53	16 September 1887
An Act for repealing certain Enactments relating to Escheators and the Procedure in cases of Escheat; and for regulating the Procedure in such cases. (Repealed by Statute Law (Repeals) Act 1989 (c. 43))
British Settlements Act 1887	50 & 51 Vict. c. 54	16 September 1887
An Act to enable Her Majesty to provide for the Government of Her Possessions acquired by Settlement.
Sheriffs Act 1887	50 & 51 Vict. c. 55	16 September 1887
An Act to consolidate the Law relating to the office of Sheriff in England, and to repeal certain enactments relating to Sheriffs which have ceased to be in force or have become unnecessary.
Friendly Societies Act 1887 (repealed)	50 & 51 Vict. c. 56	16 September 1887
An Act to amend the Friendly Societies Act, 1875. (Note: Friendly Societies Act 1875 (38 & 39 Vict. c. 60)) (Repealed by Friendly Societies Act 1896 (59 & 60 Vict. c. 25) and Collecting Societies and Industrial Assurance Companies Act 1896 (59 & 60 Vict. c. 26))
Deeds of Arrangement Act 1887 (repealed)	50 & 51 Vict. c. 57	16 September 1887
An Act to provide for the Registration of Deeds of Arrangement. (Repealed for England and Wales by Deeds of Arrangement Act 1914 (4 & 5 Geo. 5. c. 47) and for Northern Ireland by Insolvency (Northern Ireland) Order 1989 (SI 1989/2405 (N.I. 19)))
Coal Mines Regulation Act 1887 (repealed)	50 & 51 Vict. c. 58	16 September 1887
An Act to consolidate with amendments the Coal Mines Acts, 1872 (Note: Coal Mines Regulation Act 1872 (35 & 36 Vict. c. 76)) and 1886, (Note: Coal Mines Act 1886 (49 & 50 Vict. c. 40)) and the Stratified Ironstone Mines (Gunpowder) Act, 1881. (Note: Stratified Ironstone Mines (Gunpowder) Act 1881 (44 & 45 Vict. c. 26)) (Repealed by Wages Act 1986 (c. 48))
Statute Law Revision Act 1887	50 & 51 Vict. c. 59	16 September 1887
An Act for further promoting the Revision of the Statute Law by repealing Enactments which have ceased to be in force or have become unnecessary.
Prison (Officers Superannuation, Scotland) Act 1887 (repealed)	50 & 51 Vict. c. 60	16 September 1887
An Act to amend the Prison (Officers' Superannuation) Act, 1878, (Note: Prison (Officers' Superannuation) Act 1878 (41 & 42 Vict. c. 63)) as to Scotland. (Repealed by Statute Law Revision Act 1950 (14 Geo. 6. c. 6))
Local Government (Boundaries) Act 1887 (repealed)	50 & 51 Vict. c. 61	16 September 1887
An Act for appointing Commissioners to inquire and report as to the Boundaries of certain Areas of Local Government in England. (Repealed by Statute Law Revision Act 1908 (8 Edw. 7. c. 49))
Merchant Shipping (Miscellaneous) Act 1887 (repealed)	50 & 51 Vict. c. 62	16 September 1887
An Act to amend in certain minor particulars some of the Enactments relating to Merchant Shipping and Seamen. (Repealed by Merchant Shipping Act 1894 (57 & 58 Vict. c. 60))
Expiring Laws Continuance Act 1887 (repealed)	50 & 51 Vict. c. 63	16 September 1887
An Act to continue various expiring Laws. (Repealed by Statute Law Revision Act 1908 (8 Edw. 7. c. 49))
Technical Schools (Scotland) Act 1887 (repealed)	50 & 51 Vict. c. 64	16 September 1887
An Act to facilitate the Establishment of Technical Schools in Scotland. (Repealed by Education (Scotland) Act 1945 (8 & 9 Geo. 6. c. 37))
Military Tramways Act 1887 (repealed)	50 & 51 Vict. c. 65	16 September 1887
An Act to facilitate the construction of Tramways by Her Majesty's Principal Secretary of State for the War Department, and for other purposes connected therewith. (Repealed by Transport and Works Act 1992 (c. 42))
Bankruptcy (Discharge and Closure) Act 1887 (repealed)	50 & 51 Vict. c. 66	16 September 1887
An Act to amend the Law relating to the discharge of Bankrupts and the closure of Bankruptcy proceedings. (Repealed by Bankruptcy Act 1914 (4 & 5 Geo. 5. c. 59))
Superannuation Act 1887 (repealed)	50 & 51 Vict. c. 67	16 September 1887
An Act to amend the Superannuation Acts, 1834 (Note: Superannuation Act 1834 (4 & 5 Will. 4. c. 24)) and 1859; and for other purposes. (Repealed by Superannuation Act 1965 (c. 74))
Pluralities Act 1887 (repealed)	50 & 51 Vict. c. 68	16 September 1887
An Act to explain section twenty-six of the Pluralities Act, 1838. (Note: Pluralities Act 1838 (1 & 2 Vict. c. 106)) (Repealed by Pastoral Measure 1968 (No. 1) and Statute Law (Repeals) Act 1974 (c. 22))
Conveyancing (Scotland) Acts (1874 and 1879) Amendment Act 1887	50 & 51 Vict. c. 69	16 September 1887
An Act to amend the Conveyancing (Scotland) Act, 1874, (Note: Conveyancing (Scotland) Act 1874 (37 & 38 Vict. c. 94)) and the Conveyancing (Scotland) Act (1874) Amendment Act, 1879. (Note: Conveyancing (Scotland) Act (1874) Amendment Act 1879 (42 & 43 Vict. c. 40))
Appellate Jurisdiction Act 1887 (repealed)	50 & 51 Vict. c. 70	16 September 1887
An Act to amend the Appellate Jurisdiction Act, 1876. (Note: Appellate Jurisdiction Act 1876 (39 & 40 Vict. c. 59)) (Repealed by Constitutional Reform Act 2005 (c. 4))
Coroners Act 1887 (repealed)	50 & 51 Vict. c. 71	16 September 1887
An Act to consolidate the Law related to Coroners. (Repealed by Coroners Act 1988 (c. 13))
Local Authorities (Expenses) Act 1887 (repealed)	50 & 51 Vict. c. 72	16 September 1887
An Act to amend the Law relating to Expenses of Local Authorities. (Repealed by Local Government Act 1933 (23 & 24 Geo. 5. c. 51))
Copyhold Act 1887 (repealed)	50 & 51 Vict. c. 73	16 September 1887
An Act to amend the Copyhold Acts, and for the Enfranchisement of Copyhold and Customary Lands. (Repealed by Copyhold Act 1894 (57 & 58 Vict. c. 46))

=== Local acts ===
Short title	Citation	Royal assent
Long title
Drainage and Improvement of Lands Supplemental (Ireland) Act 1887	50 & 51 Vict. c. i	29 March 1887
An Act to confirm a Provisional Order under the Drainage and Improvement of Lands (Ireland) Act, 1863, (Note: Drainage and Improvement of Lands (Ireland) Act 1863 (26 & 27 Vict. c. 88)) and the Acts amending the same, relating to the Follistown Drainage District, in the County of Meath.
	Follistown Drainage Order 1887 In the matter of the Follistown Drainage District, in the county of Meath.	
Barnet District Gas and Water Act 1887 (repealed)	50 & 51 Vict. c. ii	29 March 1887
An Act to enable the Barnet District Gas and Water Company to extend their limits of Water Supply to construct new Water Works to raise additional Capital and for other purposes. (Repealed by Lee Valley Water Act 1959 (7 & 8 Eliz. 2. c. li))
Skegness and Saint Leonard's Tramway (Abandonment) Act 1887	50 & 51 Vict. c. iii	29 March 1887
An Act for the abandonment of the tramways authorised by the Skegness and Saint Leonard's Tramway Act 1885 (Note: Skegness and St. Leonards Tramway Act 1885 (48 & 49 Vict. c. cxxxii)) and for making provision as to the application of the moneys deposited in respect of the application to Parliament for the Skegness Chapel Saint Leonard's and Alford Tramways Act 1883; (Note: Skegness Chapel St. Leonards and Alford Tramways Act 1883 (46 & 47 Vict. c. clxxxiii)) and for other purposes.
London Street Tramways (Extensions) Act 1887	50 & 51 Vict. c. iv	29 March 1887
An Act to authorise the London Street Tramways Company to construct additional Tramways and for other purposes.
Southend Local Board Act 1887 (repealed)	50 & 51 Vict. c. v	29 March 1887
An Act for authorising the Local Board for the District of Southend in the County of Essex to acquire a portion of the foreshore within their district and to make and maintain new piers and a street and for other purposes. (Repealed by Essex Act 1987 (c. xx))
Edinburgh Improvement Act 1887 (repealed)	50 & 51 Vict. c. vi	29 March 1887
An Act for the improvement of certain Districts within the City of Edinburgh, and the execution of works in the Water of Leith and Mill-leads thereof, and the acquisition and filling up of the Mill-leads; and for other purposes. (Repealed by Edinburgh Corporation Order Confirmation Act 1964 (c. xli))
Rhymney Railway Act 1887	50 & 51 Vict. c. vii	29 March 1887
An Act to confer further powers on the Rhymney Railway Company in connection with their undertaking; and for other purposes.
Clyde Navigation Act 1887	50 & 51 Vict. c. viii	29 March 1887
An Act to extend the periods limited by the Clyde Navigation Act, 1883, (Note: Clyde Navigation Act 1883 (46 & 47 Vict. c. clvi)) for the compulsory purchase of Lands and for the completion of the Railway thereby authorised; to confer further powers on the Trustees of the Clyde Navigation and on the Clyde Pilot Board, with respect to the collection of Rates and Dues, the appointment of Officers, and the erection of Signals; and for other purposes.
Manchester Bury Rochdale and Oldham Steam Tramways Act 1887	50 & 51 Vict. c. ix	29 March 1887
An Act for conferring further powers on the Manchester Bury Rochdale and Oldham Steam Tramways Company.
Clerical Medical and General Life Assurance Act 1887 (repealed)	50 & 51 Vict. c. x	29 March 1887
An Act to amend the Clerical Medical and General Life Assurance Act, 1850, (Note: Clerical, Medical and General Life Assurance Act 1850 (13 & 14 Vict. c. ix)) and to make further provisions in relation to the capital of the Society and to the distribution of profits, and for other purposes. (Repealed by Clerical, Medical and General Life Assurance Act 1974 (c. xi))
Edinburgh Chartered Accountants Annuity &c. Fund Act 1887 (repealed)	50 & 51 Vict. c. xi	29 March 1887
An Act for establishing a Fund for providing Annuities and other benefits to Members of the Society of Accountants in Edinburgh, and to their widows and representatives; and for other purposes. (Repealed by Edinburgh Chartered Accountants Annuity, &c. Fund (Consolidation and Amendment) Order Confirmation Act 1936 (1 Edw. 8 & 1 Geo. 6. c. ii))
North Metropolitan Tramways Act 1887	50 & 51 Vict. c. xii	29 March 1887
An Act for empowering the North Metropolitan Tramways Company to construct new Tramways; and for other purposes.
City of London Ballot Act 1887	50 & 51 Vict. c. xiii	29 March 1887
An Act for introducing Vote by Ballot and for further regulating Municipal Elections within the city of London.
Stratford-upon-Avon, Towcester and Midland Junction Railway Act 1887	50 & 51 Vict. c. xiv	29 March 1887
An Act to authorise the Stratford-upon-Avon Towcester and Midland Junction Railway Company to create and issue Debenture Stock; and for other purposes.
Munster Bank (Limited) Liquidation Act 1887	50 & 51 Vict. c. xv	28 April 1887
An Act to facilitate the winding-up of the Munster Bank Limited to vest the remaining assets of the Munster Bank in the Munster and Leinster Bank Limited and for other purposes.
Northampton Gas Act 1887	50 & 51 Vict. c. xvi	28 April 1887
An Act for granting further powers to the Northampton Gaslight Company.
Manchester, Sheffield and Lincolnshire Railway Act 1887	50 & 51 Vict. c. xvii	28 April 1887
An Act to confer further powers on the Manchester Sheffield and Lincolnshire Railway Company in connection with their undertaking and the undertakings of other companies and for other purposes.
Local Government Board (Ireland) Provisional Order Confirmation (Carrick-on-Suir) Act 1887	50 & 51 Vict. c. xviii	28 April 1887
An Act to confirm a Provisional Order of the Local Government Board for Ireland relating to the Town of Carrick-on-Suir.
	Carrick-on-Suir (Town) Provisional Order 1887 Town of Carrick-on-Suir. Provisional Order.	
Carlisle Corporation Act 1887	50 & 51 Vict. c. xix	28 April 1887
An Act to extend and define the boundary of the city of Carlisle to confer further powers upon the Corporation of Carlisle with respect to their gas and water undertakings to make further and better provision for the improvement health and good government of the city of Carlisle and to provide for the consolidation of the loans of the Corporation of Carlisle and the conversion of those loans into stock and for other purposes.
Kirkheaton Dalton and Lepton Gas Act 1887	50 & 51 Vict. c. xx	28 April 1887
An Act for dissolving the Kirkheaton Dalton and Lepton Gas Company Limited and reincorporating the members thereof with others and for enabling them to supply Gas within the townships of Kirkheaton and Lepton in the West Riding of the county of York and for other purposes.
Renfrew County and Paisley Burgh Buildings Act 1887	50 & 51 Vict. c. xxi	28 April 1887
An Act for enabling the Commissioners of Supply of the county of Renfrew to erect and maintain new county buildings; for transferring the existing county and burgh buildings to the Town Council of Paisley; for enabling the Town Council to erect additional buildings, and to sell others belonging to the burgh; and for other purposes.
Bristol (River Frome) Act 1887	50 & 51 Vict. c. xxii	28 April 1887
An Act to enable the Mayor Aldermen and Burgesses of the City of Bristol to make a Culvert for the relief of the floods in the River Frome and for other purposes.
Belfast Corporation (Lagan Bridge) Act 1887	50 & 51 Vict. c. xxiii	28 April 1887
An Act to empower the Mayor Aldermen and Burgesses of the borough of Belfast to construct a new Bridge over the River Lagan with approaches thereto.
Glasgow Barony Parochial Board (Woodilee Asylum) Act 1887	50 & 51 Vict. c. xxiv	28 April 1887
An Act to extinguish a right of way over the lands of Woodilee belonging to the Parochial Board of the Barony Parish of Glasgow and to enable that Board to make and maintain a footpath in lieu thereof and for other purposes.
Manchester Corporation Act 1887	50 & 51 Vict. c. xxv	28 April 1887
An Act to confer further powers on the Mayor Aldermen and Citizens of the city of Manchester with reference to superfluous lands and for other purposes.
Felixstowe and Bawdsey Ferry Railway Act 1887 (repealed)	50 & 51 Vict. c. xxvi	23 May 1887
An Act for incorporating a company and authorising them to make and maintain certain railways between Felixstowe and Felixstowe (otherwise Bawdsey) Ferry in the county of Suffolk and for other purposes. (Repealed by Felixstowe and Bawdsey Ferry Railway (Abandonment) Act 1892 (55 & 56 Vict. c. xvi))
Millwall Dock Act 1887 (repealed)	50 & 51 Vict. c. xxvii	23 May 1887
An Act to confer further powers upon the Millwall Dock Company; and for other purposes. (Repealed by Port of London (Consolidation) Act 1920 (10 & 11 Geo. 5. c. clxxiii))
Highland Railway Act 1887	50 & 51 Vict. c. xxviii	23 May 1887
An Act to confer further powers on the Highland Railway Company; and for other purposes.
London Brighton and South Coast Railway (Various Powers) Act 1887	50 & 51 Vict. c. xxix	23 May 1887
An Act to confer further powers on the London Brighton and South Coast Railway Company and for other purposes.
Orkney Roads Act 1887	50 & 51 Vict. c. xxx	23 May 1887
An Act to amend the Roads and Bridges (Scotland) Act, 1878, (Note: Roads and Bridges (Scotland) Act 1878 (41 & 42 Vict. c. 51)) as regards the county of Orkney; and for other purposes.
Metropolitan Police Provisional Order Confirmation Act 1887 (repealed)	50 & 51 Vict. c. xxxi	23 May 1887
An Act to confirm a Provisional Order made by one of Her Majesty’s Principal Secretaries of State under the Metropolitan Police Act, 1886, (Note: Metropolitan Police Act 1886 (49 & 50 Vict. c. 22)) relating to lands in the Parishes of Leyton (Essex) and Coulsdon (Surrey). (Repealed by Statute Law (Repeals) Act 2008 (c. 12))
	Provisional Order made by the Secretary of State under the Metropolitan Police Act, 1886.	
Governments Stock Investment Company Act 1887 (repealed)	50 & 51 Vict. c. xxxii	23 May 1887
An Act for regulating the Capital of the Government Stock Investment Company Limited and for other purposes. (Repealed by Governments Stock and other Securities Investment Company Act 1928 (18 & 19 Geo. 5. c. vii))
Law Life Assurance Society's Act 1887	50 & 51 Vict. c. xxxiii	23 May 1887
An Act to make further provision as to the Investment of the Moneys of and to confer further powers upon the Law Life Assurance Society and for other purposes.
Municipal Trust Company, Limited Act 1887	50 & 51 Vict. c. xxxiv	23 May 1887
An Act to confirm a certain special Resolution for dividing the ordinary Share Capital of the Municipal Trust Company, Limited, into preferred Shares and deferred Shares, and for other purposes.
Liverpool Hydraulic Power Act 1887	50 & 51 Vict. c. xxxv	23 May 1887
An Act for extending the district of the Liverpool Hydraulic Power Company and for other purposes.
Banffshire Solicitors Society Act 1887	50 & 51 Vict. c. xxxvi	23 May 1887
An Act to effect the winding-up and dissolution of the Society of Solicitors of Banffshire.
London, Hendon and Harrow Railway (Abandonment) Act 1887 (repealed)	50 & 51 Vict. c. xxxvii	23 May 1887
An Act for the Abandonment of the London, Hendon and Harrow Railway. (Repealed by Statute Law (Repeals) Act 2013 (c. 2))
Manchester Middleton and District Tramways Act 1887	50 & 51 Vict. c. xxxviii	23 May 1887
An Act to extend the time for the compulsory purchase of lands and for completing the Manchester Middleton and District Tramways and for other purposes.
Cardiff Gas Act 1887	50 & 51 Vict. c. xxxix	23 May 1887
An Act to enable the Cardiff Gas Light and Coke Company to raise further Capital to acquire additional Lands to construct New Works and for other purposes.
Ayrshire and Wigtownshire Railway Act 1887	50 & 51 Vict. c. xl	23 May 1887
An Act to incorporate a Company for the maintaining and working of the Girvan and Portpatrick Junction Railway; and for other purposes,
Brentford and District Tramways Act 1887 (repealed)	50 & 51 Vict. c. xli	23 May 1887
An Act to extend the time for the compulsory purchase of Lands and for the construction of the Tramways Street widening Bridge widening and other works authorised by the Brentford and District Tramways Act 1885. (Note: Brentford and District Tramways Act 1885 (48 & 49 Vict. c. lxxx)) (Repealed by Brentford and District Tramways (Abandonment) Act 1890 (53 & 54 Vict. c. xvi))
Midland and South Western Junction Railway Act 1887	50 & 51 Vict. c. xlii	23 May 1887
An Act to confer further powers on the Midland and South Western Junction Railway Company.
Dublin Southern District Tramways Act 1887	50 & 51 Vict. c. xliii	23 May 1887
An Act to provide for the release of the Money deposited in respect of the application to Parliament for the Dublin Southern District Tramways Act 1883; (Note: Dublin Southern District Tramways Act 1883 (46 & 47 Vict. c. ccxxxii)) and for other purposes.
Llangammarch and Neath and Brecon Junction Railway Act 1887 (repealed)	50 & 51 Vict. c. xliv	23 May 1887
An Act to extend the time for purchasing Land and completing the Llangammarch and Neath and Brecon Junction Railway. (Repealed by Llangammarch and Neath and Brecon Junction Railway (Abandonment) Act 1890 (53 & 54 Vict. c. xxvi))
West Lancashire Railways Act 1887	50 & 51 Vict. c. xlv	23 May 1887
An Act to confer further powers on the West Lancashire Railway Company in relation to their Preston Docks Extension Railway and for other purposes.
Blackburn Corporation Tramways Act 1887 (repealed)	50 & 51 Vict. c. xlvi	23 May 1887
An Act to extend the time for construction of Tramways authorised by the Blackburn Improvement Act 1882 (Note: Blackburn Improvement Act 1882 (45 & 46 Vict. c. ccxliii)) and for other purposes. (Repealed by County of Lancashire Act 1984 (c. xxi))
Cockermouth Local Board (Lighting) Act 1887	50 & 51 Vict. c. xlvii	23 May 1887
An Act to provide for the transfer of the undertaking of the Cockermouth Gaslight and Coke Company to the Cockermouth Local Board; and for other purposes.
National Assurance Company of Ireland Act 1887	50 & 51 Vict. c. xlviii	23 May 1887
An Act to amend the National Assurance Company of Ireland Act 1876 (Note: National Assurance Company of Ireland Act 1876 (39 & 40 Vict. c. lxxxvi)) and to make further provision with respect to the Charter and Capital of the Company and as to Agreements made by the Company and for other purposes.
Local Government Board's Provisional Orders Confirmation Act 1887	50 & 51 Vict. c. xlix	23 May 1887
An Act to confirm certain Provisional Orders of the Local Government Board relating to the Local Government District of Aldershot, the Improvement Act District of Bethesda, the Local Government District of Bridlington, the Borough of Cheltenham, the Local Government District of Epsom, the Special Drainage District of Merton Rush, the Local Government District of Pontypool, the Borough of Saint Helen’s, and the Improvement Act District of Surbiton.
	Aldershot Order 1887 Provisional Order to enable the Sanitary Authority for the Urban Sanitary District of Aldershot to put in force the Compulsory Clauses of the Lands Clauses Consolidation Acts.	
	Bethesda Order 1887 Provisional Order for altering a Confirming Act. (Note: Local Government Board's Provisional Orders Confirmation (No. 6) Act 1882 (45 & 46 Vict. c. lxiii))	
	Bridlington Order 1887 Provisional Order to enable the Sanitary Authority for the Urban Sanitary District of Bridlington to put in force the Compulsory Clauses of the Lands Clauses Consolidation Acts.	
	Cheltenham Order 1887 Provisional Order to enable the Sanitary Authority for the Borough of Cheltenham to put in force the Compulsory Clauses of the Lands Clauses Consolidation Acts.	
	Epsom Order 1887 Provisional Order to enable the Sanitary Authority for the Urban Sanitary District of Epsom to put in force the Compulsory Clauses of the Lands Clauses Consolidation Acts.	
	Merton Rush Order 1887 Provisional Order for dissolving the Special Drainage District of Merton Rush.	
	Pontypool Order 1887 Provisional Order to enable the Sanitary Authority for the Urban Sanitary District of Pontypool to put in force the Compulsory Clauses of the Lands Clauses Consolidation Acts.	
	Saint Helens Order 1887 Provisional Order for altering the Saint Helen's (Corporation) Water Act, 1882. (Note: Saint Helens (Corporation) Water Act 1882 (45 & 46 Vict. c. cxlix))	
	Surbiton Order 1887 Provisional Order to enable the Sanitary Authority for the Urban Sanitary District of Surbiton to put in force the Compulsory Clauses of the Lands Clauses Consolidation Acts.	
North Eastern Railway Act 1887	50 & 51 Vict. c. l	23 May 1887
An Act for enabling The North Eastern Railway Company to make new railways; and for other purposes.
Regent's Canal, City and Docks Railway (Extension of Time) Act 1887	50 & 51 Vict. c. li	23 May 1887
An Act to extend the time limited by the Regent's Canal City and Docks Railway Act 1882 (Note: Regent's Canal, City, and Docks Railway Act 1882 (45 & 46 Vict. c. cclxii) for the compulsory purchase of lands for and for the completion of works thereby authorised and for other purposes.
Southampton Harbour Act 1887	50 & 51 Vict. c. lii	23 May 1887
An Act to amend and extend the Acts relating to the Southampton Harbour Board and for other purposes.
Golden Valley Railway Act 1887	50 & 51 Vict. c. liii	23 May 1887
An Act to authorise the Golden Valley Railway Company to raise further money to extend the time for completion of the railway authorised by their Act of 1884 (Note: Golden Valley Railway (Hay Extension) Act 1884 (47 & 48 Vict. c. cclii)) and for other purposes.
Barry Dock and Railways Act 1887	50 & 51 Vict. c. liv	23 May 1887
An Act to confer further powers on the Barry Dock and Railways Company.
Aberdeen Royal Infirmary and Lunatic Asylum Act 1887	50 & 51 Vict. c. lv	23 May 1887
An Act to incorporate the President and Managers of the Royal Infirmary and Lunatic Asylum of Aberdeen and for other purposes.
Accrington Corporation Steam Tramways (Haslingden and Rawtenstall Extension) Act 1887	50 & 51 Vict. c. lvi	5 July 1887
An Act to dissolve and re-incorporate the Accrington Corporation Steam Tramways Company (Limited) and to authorise the construction of Tramways from Baxenden to Haslingden and Rawtenstall and for other purposes.
Local Government Board's Provisional Order Confirmation (Highways) Act 1887	50 & 51 Vict. c. lvii	5 July 1887
An Act to confirm a Provisional Order of the Local Government Board under the Highways and Locomotives (Amendment) Act, 1878, (Note: Highways and Locomotives (Amendment) Act 1878 (41 & 42 Vict. c. 77)) relating to the North Riding of the County of York.
	York (North Riding) Order 1887 Provisional Order as to certain Disturnpiked Roads.	
Local Government Board's Provisional Order Confirmation (Poor Law) Act 1887	50 & 51 Vict. c. lviii	5 July 1887
An Act to confirm certain Orders of the Local Government Board under the provisions of the Divided Parishes and Poor Law Amendment Act, 1876, (Note: Divided Parishes and Poor Law Amendment Act 1876 (39 & 40 Vict. c. 61)) as amended and extended by the Poor Law Act, 1879, (Note: Poor Law Act 1879 (42 & 43 Vict. c. 54)) relating to the Parishes of Birtley, Carlton Little, Cockerington North, Cockerington South, Ludford Magna, Ludford Parva, Reston North, Swaby, Theddlethorpe All Saints, and Theddlethorpe Saint Helen's; and to the Townships of Bagby, Belleau, Chollerton, Dalton, and Louth Park.
	Birtley and Chollerton Order 1887 Bellingham and Hexham Unions.	
	Belleau, &c. Order 1887 Louth Union.	
	Bagby and Dalton Order 1887 Thirsk Union.	
Local Government Board's Provisional Orders Confirmation (Poor Law) (No. 2) Act 1887	50 & 51 Vict. c. lix	5 July 1887
An Act to confirm certain Orders of the Local Government Board under the provisions of the Divided Parishes and Poor Law Amendment Act, 1876, as amended and extended by the Poor Law Act, 1879, relating to the Parishes of Asterby, Cowbit, Curdworth, Dalderby, Durston, Goulceby, Langton, Lyng, Mareham-le-Fen, Pinchbeck, Revesby, Scrivelsby, Spalding, Tattershall, Thimbleby, Thornton, and Woodhall; to the Township of Tattershall Thorpe, and to the Hamlet of Minworth.
	Cudworth and Minworth Order 1887 Aston Union.	
	Durston and Lyng Order 1887 Bridgewater and Taunton Unions.	
	Asterby, &c. Order 1887 Horncastle Union.	
	Cowbit, Pinchbeck, and Spalding Order 1887 Spalding Union.	
Cardiff Corporation Act 1887	50 & 51 Vict. c. lx	5 July 1887
An Act to authorise the construction of bridges over the River Taff and the Glamorganshire Canal and roads and approaches in connexion therewith and for other purposes.
Kirkcaldy and District Tramways (Abandonment) Act 1887	50 & 51 Vict. c. lxi	5 July 1887
An Act for the abandonment of the Kirkcaldy and District Tramways and for authorising the repayment of the money deposited for securing the completion thereof.
Hull and North Western Junction Railway Act 1887 (repealed)	50 & 51 Vict. c. lxii	5 July 1887
An Act for incorporating the Hull and North-Western Junction Rail wav Company and for transferring to such Company certain powers of the Hull Barnsley and West Riding Junction Railway and Dock Company and for other purposes. (Repealed by Hull and North Western Junction Railway (Abandonment) Act 1894 (57 & 58 Vict. c. xiii))
Hyde Park Corner (Streets Maintenance) Act 1887	50 & 51 Vict. c. lxiii	5 July 1887
An Act to provide for the Maintenance of the new Streets at Hyde Park Corner.
Kilrush and Kilkee Railway and Poulnasherry Reclamation Act 1887	50 & 51 Vict. c. lxiv	5 July 1887
An Act to authorise the repayment of moneys deposited in respect of the railways authorised to be constructed by the Kilrush and Kilkee Railway and Poulnasherry Reclamation Company.
Downham and Stoke Ferry Railway Act 1887	50 & 51 Vict. c. lxv	5 July 1887
An Act to authorise the Downham and Stoke Ferry Railway Company to abandon the construction of a portion of their authorised railways and for other purposes.
Basingstoke Gas Act 1887	50 & 51 Vict. c. lxvi	5 July 1887
An Act for incorporating and conferring powers on the Basingstoke Gas and Coke Company.
Great Eastern and Felixstowe Railways Arrangement Act 1887	50 & 51 Vict. c. lxvii	5 July 1887
An Act to authorise and provide for the sale and transfer to the Great Eastern Railway Company of the part of the undertaking of the Felixstowe Railway and Dock Company authorised by the Felixstowe Railway and Pier Act 1875 (Note: Felixstowe Railway and Pier Act 1875 (38 & 39 Vict. c. cxlv)) to change the name of the Felixstowe Railway and Dock Company; and for other purposes.
Bishop's Castle and Montgomery Railway (Abandonment) Act 1887 (repealed)	50 & 51 Vict. c. lxviii	5 July 1887
An Act for the abandonment of the Bishop's Castle and Montgomery Railway. (Repealed by Statute Law (Repeals) Act 2013 (c. 2))
Newark and Ollerton Railway Act 1887	50 & 51 Vict. c. lxix	5 July 1887
An Act for incorporating the Newark and Ollerton Railway Company and authorising them to make and maintain the Newark and Ollerton Railway and for other purposes.
Edinburgh Northern Tramways Act 1887 (repealed)	50 & 51 Vict. c. lxx	5 July 1887
An Act to enable the Edinburgh Northern Tramways Company to make and maintain additional Tramways and for other purposes. (Repealed by Edinburgh Corporation Order Confirmation Act 1932 (22 & 23 Geo. 5. c. vii))
Wakefield Corporation Act 1887 (repealed)	50 & 51 Vict. c. lxxi	5 July 1887
An Act to make further and better provision in relation to the Water Supply Health Local Government and improvement of the borough of Wakefield in the West Riding of the county of York and to empower the Corporation of that borough to create and issue Corporation Stock and for other purposes. (Repealed by West Yorkshire Act 1980 (c. xiv))
Dundee Street Tramways, Recreation Grounds, Police and Improvement Act 1887 (repealed)	50 & 51 Vict. c. lxxii	5 July 1887
An Act to authorise the Dundee Police Commissioners to abandon portions of their existing tramways, and to make a new tramway; to construct a sea wall or bulwark, and other works; to take and appropriate lands for a public park; and for other purposes. (Repealed by Dundee Corporation (Consolidated Powers) Order Confirmation Act 1957 (6 & 7 Eliz. 2. c. iv))
Holywell and District Water Act 1887	50 & 51 Vict. c. lxxiii	5 July 1887
An Act for incorporating the Holywell and District Water Company and empowering them to construct Waterworks and supply Water and for other purposes.
Pier and Harbour Orders Confirmation (No. 1) Act 1887	50 & 51 Vict. c. lxxiv	5 July 1887
An Act to confirm certain Provisional Orders made by the Board of Trade under the General Pier and Harbour Act, 1861, (Note: General Pier and Harbour Act 1861 (24 & 25 Vict. c. 45)) relating to Aberdeen, Alum Bay, Greenock, Sandown, and Teignmouth.
	Aberdeen Harbour Order 1887 Order for amending the Aberdeen Harbour Act, 1879; (Note: Aberdeen Harbour Act 1879 (42 & 43 Vict. c. lxxxviii)) and for conferring further powers on the Aberdeen Harbour Commissioners.	
	Alum Bay Pier Order 1887 Order for the Construction, Maintenance, and Regulation of a Pier and Works at Alum Bay, in the Parish of Freshwater, in the Isle of Wight and County of Southampton.	
	Greenock Harbour Order 1887 Order for amending the Greenock Port and Harbours Acts, 1866 to 1884.	
	Sandown Pier Order 1887 Order for extending the time and giving further powers for construction of Works under The Sandown Pier Order, 1874.	
	Teignmouth Quays Order 1887 Order for the Construction of New Quays in the River Teign and other Works in connexion therewith at West Teignmouth in the County of Devon.	
Local Government Board (Ireland) Provisional Order Confirmation (Limerick Waterworks) Act 1887	50 & 51 Vict. c. lxxv	5 July 1887
An Act to confirm a Provisional Order of the Local Government Board for Ireland relating to Waterworks in the City of Limerick.
	Limerick Waterworks Provisional Order 1887 Limerick Waterworks. Provisional Order.	
Commons Regulation (Ewer) Provisional Order Confirmation Act 1887	50 & 51 Vict. c. lxxvi	5 July 1887
An Act to confirm a Provisional Order for the Regulation of Ewer Common, situated in the parish of Alverstoke, in the county of Southampton, in pursuance of a report of the Land Commissioners for England.
	Ewer Common Order 1887 Provisional Order for the Regulation of Ewer Common.	
Commons Regulation (Laindon) Provisional Order Confirmation Act 1887	50 & 51 Vict. c. lxxvii	5 July 1887
An Act to confirm a Provisional Order for the Regulation of Lain don Common, situated in the parish of Laindon, in the county of Essex, in pursuance of a report from the Land Commissioners for England.
	Laindon Common Order 1887 Provisional Order for the Regulation of Laindon Common.	
Surrey and Hants District Waterworks Act 1887	50 & 51 Vict. c. lxxviii	5 July 1887
An Act for dissolving the Farnborough (Surrey and Hants) District Waterworks Company Limited and re-incorporating the members thereof with others and for enabling them to construct Waterworks and supply Water and for other purposes.
Hull, Barnsley and West Riding Junction Railway and Dock Act 1887	50 & 51 Vict. c. lxxix	5 July 1887
An Act for extending the periods limited for the compulsory purchase of lands for and for the completion of certain of the authorised works of the Hull Barnsley and West Riding Junction Railway and Dock Company and for the abandonment of other of their authorised works for authorising the construction of a new railway by the Company and for other purposes.
Bexley Heath Railway Act 1887	50 & 51 Vict. c. lxxx	5 July 1887
An Act to authorise the Bexley Heath Railway Company to extend their railway to Blackheath to abandon a portion of their authorised railway and for other purposes.
North British Railway Act 1887	50 & 51 Vict. c. lxxxi	5 July 1887
An Act to authorise the North British Railway Company to make a Railway in the county of Linlithgow; to amalgamate with the Company the undertaking of the Glasgow City and District Railway Company; to subscribe to the undertaking of the Anstruther and St. Andrews Railway Company; to amend various Acts; and for other purposes.
Local Government Board's Provisional Order Confirmation (Poor Law) (No. 3) Act 1887 (repealed)	50 & 51 Vict. c. lxxxii	5 July 1887
An Act to confirm an Order of the Local Government Board under the provisions of the Divided Parishes and Poor Law Amendment Act, 1876, as amended and extended by the Poor Law Act, 1879, relating to the Parishes of Aldington, Saint Leonard, Hythe, and West Hythe. (Repealed by County of Kent Act 1981 (c. xviii))
	Aldington, Saint Leonard, Hythe, and West Hythe Order 1887 East Ashford, Elham, and Romney Marsh Unions.	
Local Government Board's Provisional Orders Confirmation (Gas) Act 1887	50 & 51 Vict. c. lxxxiii	5 July 1887
An Act to confirm certain Provisional Orders of the Local Government Board under the provisions of the Gas and Water Works Facilities Act, 1870, (Note: Gas and Water Works Facilities Act 1870 (33 & 34 Vict. c. 70)) the Gas and Water Works Facilities Act, 1870, Amendment Act, 1873, (Note: Gas and Water Works Facilities Act 1870 Amendment Act 1873 (36 & 37 Vict. c. 89)) and the Public Health Act, 1875, (Note: Public Health Act 1875 (38 & 39 Vict. c. 55)) relating to the Local Government Districts of East Dereham and Meltham.
	East Dereham Gas Order 1887 Provisional Order under the Gas and Water Works Facilities Act, 1870, and the Gas and Water Works Facilities Act, 1870, Amendment Act, 1873.	
	Meltham Gas Order 1887 Provisional Order under the Gas and Water Works Facilities Act, 1870.	
Local Government Board's Provisional Orders Confirmation (No. 2) Act 1887	50 & 51 Vict. c. lxxxiv	5 July 1887
An Act to confirm certain Provisional Orders of the Local Government Board relating to the Local Government District of Abergele and Pensarn, the District of Bilston, the Boroughs of Bradford (Yorks.) and Evesham, the Improvement Act District of Leek, the Local Government Districts of Leyton and Wanstead, and the Borough of Ramsgate.
	Abergele and Pensarn Order 1887 Provisional Order for altering a Confirming Act. (Note: Local Government Board's Provisional Orders Confirmation (Aberavon, &c.) Act 1876 (39 & 40 Vict. c. lxxxvii))	
	Bilston Order 1887 Provisional Order for altering the Bilston Improvement Act, 1850. (Note: Bilston Improvement Act 1850 (13 & 14 Vict. c. xcvi))	
	Bradford (Yorks.) Order 1887 Provisional Order for altering the Bradford Corporation Act, 1866. (Note: Bradford Corporation Act 1866 (29 & 30 Vict. c. ccxxii))	
	Evesham Order 1887 Provisional Order for altcring a Local Act. (Note: Evesham Improvement Act 1824 (5 Geo. 4. c. lxvii))	
	Leek Order 1887 Provisional Order for altering the Leek Improvement Act, 1855. (Note: Leek Improvement Act 1855 (18 & 19 Vict. c. cxxxii))	
	Leyton and Wanstead Order 1887 Provisional Order for extending the Local Government Districts of Leyton and Wanstead.	
	Ramsgate Order 1887 Provisional Order for altering a Local Act (Note: Ramsgate Local Board Act 1877 (40 & 41 Vict. c. cxix)) and a Confirming Act. (Note: Local Government Board's Provisional Orders Confirmation (Eastbourne, &c.) Act 1880 (43 & 44 Vict. c. cxxxii))	
Edinburgh Public Library Assessment Act 1887 (repealed)	50 & 51 Vict. c. lxxxv	5 July 1887
An Act to provide for the levying of the Assessments under the Public Libraries (Scotland) Acts in the City of Edinburgh; and for other purposes. (Repealed by Edinburgh Corporation Order Confirmation Act 1932 (22 & 23 Geo. 5. c. vii))
Coventry and District Tramways Act 1887 (repealed)	50 & 51 Vict. c. lxxxvi	5 July 1887
An Act for authorising the release of the balance of the deposit fund remaining deposited as security for the completion of certain of the tramways authorised by the Coventry and District Tramways Act 1880. (Note: Coventry and District Tramways Act 1880 (43 & 44 Vict. c. clxxxv)) (Repealed by West Midlands County Council Act 1980 (c. xi))
Burnard and Alger's Cattedown Wharves Act 1887	50 & 51 Vict. c. lxxxvii	5 July 1887
An Act to authorise the levying of rates at the Cattedown Wharves Plymouth and for other purposes.
Blyth and Cowpen Gas Act 1887	50 & 51 Vict. c. lxxxviii	5 July 1887
An Act to re-incorporate with further powers the Blyth and Cowpen Gaslight Company Limited.
Sutton District Waterworks Act 1887	50 & 51 Vict. c. lxxxix	5 July 1887
An Act to authorise the Sutton District Water Company to raise further capital and for other purposes.
Dundalk Gas Company Act 1887	50 & 51 Vict. c. xc	5 July 1887
An Act to dissolve the Dundalk Gas Company Limited and to incorporate a new Company; and for other purposes.
Walton-on-Thames and Weybridge Gas Act 1887	50 & 51 Vict. c. xci	5 July 1887
An Act to enable the Walton-on-Thames and Weybridge Gas Company to acquire additional land and to erect and maintain additional works to raise further capital and for other purposes.
Dundalk Commissioners (Gas) Act 1887	50 & 51 Vict. c. xcii	5 July 1887
An Act to authorise the Town Commissioners of Dundalk to apply their funds and to raise further funds for the purchase of the works and undertaking of the Dundalk Gas Company; and for other purposes.
Great Northern Railway Act 1887	50 & 51 Vict. c. xciii	5 July 1887
An Act to confer further powers upon the Great Northern Railway Company with respect to their own undertaking and undertakings in which they are jointly interested and upon the Halifax High Level and North and South Junction Railway Company with respect to their undertaking and for other purposes.
Chelsea Waterworks Act 1887	50 & 51 Vict. c. xciv	5 July 1887
An Act to enable the Governor and Company of Chelsea Waterworks to dispose of certain lands and for other purposes.
New Shoreham Harbour Act 1887 (repealed)	50 & 51 Vict. c. xcv	5 July 1887
An Act for empowering the Shoreham Harbour Trustees to raise money by the creation and issue of Debenture Stock and for amending the New Shoreham Harbour Acts; and for other purposes. (Repealed by Shoreham Harbour Act 1926 (16 & 17 Geo. 5. c. xlvii))
Flamborough Head Tramways Act 1887 (repealed)	50 & 51 Vict. c. xcvi	5 July 1887
An Act for incorporating the Flamborough Head Tramways Company and empowering them to construct Tramways and other works in the East Riding of the County of York and for other purposes. (Repealed by Flamborough Head Tramways (Abandonment) Act 1891 (54 & 55 Vict. c. cxxviii))
Christchurch Charter Amendment Act 1887	50 & 51 Vict. c. xcvii	5 July 1887
An Act to correct an Error in the Charter of Incorporation granted to the Borough of Christchurch in the County of Southampton.
Kilsyth and Bonnybridge Railway Act 1887	50 & 51 Vict. c. xcviii	12 July 1887
An Act to revive and extend the powers granted to the Kilsyth and Bonnybridge Railway Company for the compulsory purchase of certain lands and to extend the time for the completion of their authorised railways to enable the Company to raise further capital and for other purposes.
Local Government Board's Provisional Orders Confirmation (No. 3) Act 1887	50 & 51 Vict. c. xcix	12 July 1887
An Act to confirm certain Provisional Orders of the Local Government Board relating to the Local Government District of Alverstoke, the Boroughs of Dewsbury, Great Torrington, Halifax, and Nottingham, and the Rural Sanitary District of the Saint Thomas Union.
	Alverstoke Order 1887 Provisional Order to enable the Sanitary Authority for the Urban Sanitary District of Alverstoke to put in force the Compulsory Clauses of the Lands Clauses Consolidation Acts.	
	Dewsbury Order 1887 Provisional Order to enable the Urban Sanitary Authority for the Borough of Dewsbury to put in force the Compulsory Clauses of the Lands Clauses Consolidation Acts.	
	Great Torrington Order 1887 Provisional Order to enable the Urban Sanitary Authority for the Borough of Great Torrington to put in force the Compulsory Clauses of the Lands Clauses Consolidation Acts.	
	Halifax Order 1887 Provisional Order to enable the Urban Sanitary Authority for the Borough of Halifax to put in force the Compulsory Clauses of the Lands Clauses Consolidation Acts.	
	Nottingham Order 1887 Provisional Order to enable the Urban Sanitary Authority for the Borough of Nottingham to put in force the Compulsory Clauses of the Lands Clauses Consolidation Acts.	
	Saint Thomas Union Order 1887 Provisional Order to enable the Sanitary Authority for the Rural Sanitary District of the Saint Thomas Union to put in force the Compulsory Clauses of the Lands Clauses Consolidation Acts.	
Oyster and Mussel Fisheries Order Confirmation Act 1887	50 & 51 Vict. c. c	12 July 1887
An Act to confirm an Order made by the Board of Trade under the Sea Fisheries Act, 1868, (Note: Sea Fisheries Act 1868 (31 & 32 Vict. c. 45)) relating to Poole (Wareham Channel).
	Poole (Wareham Channel) Fishery Order 1887 Order for the establishment and maintenance by the Fowley Oyster Fishery Company, Limited, of a Several Oyster and Mussel Fishery in the Wareham Channel at Poole, in the County of Dorset.	
Metropolis (Cable Street, Shadwell) Provisional Order Confirmation Act 1887	50 & 51 Vict. c. ci	12 July 1887
An Act to confirm a Provisional Order of one of Her Majesty's Principal Secretaries of State for the improvement of an unhealthy area at Shadwell within the Metropolis.
	Cable Street, Shadwell Order 1887 The Artizans and Labourers Dwellings Improvement Acts, 1875-1885. The Metropolis (Cable Street, Shadwell) Improvement, 1886. Provisional Order.	
Metropolis (Shelton Street, St. Giles) Provisional Order Confirmation Act 1887	50 & 51 Vict. c. cii	12 July 1887
An Act to confirm a Provisional Order of one of Her Majesty's Principal Secretaries of State for the improvement of an unhealthy area at Saint Giles-in-the-Fields within the Metropolis.
	Shelton Street, St. Giles Order 1887 The Artizans and Labourers Dwellings Improvement Acts, 1875-1885. The Metropolis (Shelton Street, St. Giles) Improvement, 1886. Provisional Order.	
Kenmare Junction Railway Act 1887 (repealed)	50 & 51 Vict. c. ciii	12 July 1887
An Act to increase the baronial guarantee authorised by the Kenmare Junction Railway Act 1884; (Note: Kenmare Junction Railway Act 1884 (47 & 48 Vict. c. cxliv)) to extend the time for the purchase of lands and completion of the railway; and for other purposes. (Repealed by Kenmare Junction Railway (Abandonment) Act 1890 (53 & 54 Vict. c. xlviii))
Witham Drainage (Hobhole Sluice) Act 1887	50 & 51 Vict. c. civ	12 July 1887
An Act to authorise the General Commissioners for Drainage by the River With am to widen and improve Hobhole Sluice and to confer further powers upon those Commissioners and upon the District Commissioners under the Witham Drainage Acts and for other purposes.
City of London and Southwark Subway (Kennington Extensions, &c.) Act 1887	50 & 51 Vict. c. cv	12 July 1887
An Act to empower the City of London and Southwark Subway Company to extend their authorised Subway from the Elephant and Castle to Kennington and Stockwell and for other purposes.
Metropolitan Board of Works (Various Powers) Act 1887	50 & 51 Vict. c. cvi	12 July 1887
An Act to confer further Powers on the Metropolitan Board of Works as to Streets Bridges and open Spaces as to the Drainage of a detached portion of Clerkenwell Parish and for other purposes.
Weston-super-Mare Improvement Act 1887	50 & 51 Vict. c. cvii	12 July 1887
An Act for authorising the Weston-super-Mare Improvement Commissioners to acquire additional lands to construct additional works and to raise further Moneys for the purposes of their Water undertaking and to make further and better provision for the Improvement Health and good Government of the Urban Sanitary District of Weston-super-Mare and for other purposes.
Merionethshire Railway (Abandonment) Act 1887 (repealed)	50 & 51 Vict. c. cviii	12 July 1887
An Act for the abandonment of the railways authorised by the Merionethshire Railway Act 1871. (Note: Merionethshire Railway Act 1871 (34 & 35 Vict. c. lxxii)) (Repealed by Statute Law (Repeals) Act 2013 (c. 2))
Manchester Ship Canal Act 1887 (repealed)	50 & 51 Vict. c. cix	12 July 1887
An Act to enable the Manchester Ship Canal Company to raise a portion of their Capital by means of preference shares. (Repealed by Manchester Ship Canal Harbour Revision Order 2009 (SI 2009/2579))
South-eastern Railway Act 1887	50 & 51 Vict. c. cx	12 July 1887
An Act for conferring further powers with reference to the South-eastern Railway Company's undertaking and the undertakings of other Companies and for other purposes.
Local Government Board's Provisional Orders Confirmation (No. 6) Act 1887	50 & 51 Vict. c. cxi	19 July 1887
An Act to confirm certain Provisional Orders of the Local Government Board relating to the City of Bath, the Local Government Districts of Birstal and Dalton-in-Furness, the City of Newcastle-upon-Tyne, and the Borough of Southport.
	Bath Order 1887 Provisional Order for altering a Local Act (Note: Bath Act 1870 (33 & 34 Vict. c. liii)) and a Confirming Act. (Note: Local Government Board's Provisional Orders Confirmation (Aberdare, &c.) Act 1875 (38 & 39 Vict. c. clxxv))	
	Birstal Order 1887 Provisional Order for altering the Birstal Local Board Act, 1872. (Note: Birstal Local Board Act 1872 (35 & 36 Vict. c. lxxiii))	
	Dalton-in-Furness Order 1887 Provisional Order for altering the Dalton-in-Furness District Local Board Act, 1878. (Note: Dalton-in-Furness District Local Board Act 1878 (41 & 42 Vict. c. lxiii))	
	Newcastle-upon-Tyne Order 1887 Provisional Order for altering certain Local Acts. (Note: Newcastle-upon-Tyne Improvement Act 1837 (7 Will. 4 & 1 Vict. c. lxxii)) (Note: Newcastle-upon-Tyne Improvement Act 1841 (4 & 5 Vict. c. lxxi)) (Note: Newcastle-upon-Tyne Improvement Act 1865 (28 & 29 Vict. c. ccl)) (Note: Newcastle-upon-Tyne Improvement Act 1870 (33 & 34 Vict. c. cxx)) (Note: Newcastle-upon-Tyne Improvement Act 1871 (34 & 35 Vict. c. cxxxv)) (Note: Newcastle-upon-Tyne Corporation Loans Act 1882 (45 & 46 Vict. c. ccxxxv))	
	Southport Order 1887 Provisional Order for partially repealing and altering certain Local (Note: Southport Improvement Act 1865 (28 & 29 Vict. c. cxcv)) (Note: Southport Improvement Act 1871 (34 & 35 Vict. c. cxl)) (Note: Southport Improvement Act 1875 (38 & 39 Vict. c. cxxvi)) (Note: Southport Improvement Act 1876 (39 & 40 Vict. c. cxxvii)) (Note: Southport Improvement Act 1885 (48 & 49 Vict. c. cxxii)) and Confirming Acts. (Note: Local Government Board's Provisional Orders Confirmation (Abingdon, &c.) Act 1878 (41 & 42 Vict. c. xxxvii)) (Note: Local Government Board's Provisional Orders Confirmation (Abingdon, &c.) Act 1880 (43 & 44 Vict. c. xxxvi)) (Note: Local Government Board's Provisional Orders Confirmation (No. 6) Act 1886 (50 Vict. c. viii))	
Local Government Board's Provisional Orders Confirmation (No. 8) Act 1887	50 & 51 Vict. c. cxii	19 July 1887
An Act to confirm certain Provisional Orders of the Local Government Board relating to the Borough of Burnley, the Urban Sanitary District of Folkestone, the Local Government District of Garw and Ogmore, the Rural Sanitary District of the Newport (Mon.) Union, and the Borough of Stafford.
	Burnley Order 1887 Provisional Order for altering certain Local Acts. (Note: Burnley Borough Improvement Act 1871 (34 & 35 Vict. c. cliv)) (Note: Burnley Borough Improvement Act 1883 (46 & 47 Vict. c. lxxvii))	
	Folkestone Order 1887 Provisional Order for partially repealing and altering the Folkestone Improvement Act, 1855. (Note: Folkestone Improvement Act 1855 (18 & 19 Vict. c. cxlvii))	
	Garw and Ogmore Order 1887 Provisional Order for constituting a Local Government District, and for other purposes.	
	Newport (Mon.) Order 1887 Provisional Order to enable the Sanitary Authority for the Rural Sanitary District of the Newport (Mon.) Union to put in force the Compulsory Clauses of the Lands Clauses Consolidation Acts.	
	Stafford Order 1887 Provisional Order for altering a Confirming Act. (Note: Local Government Board's Provisional Orders Confirmation (No. 5) Act 1885 (48 & 49 Vict. c. lxii))	
Local Government Board (Ireland) Provisional Order (Killiney and Ballybrack) Act 1887	50 & 51 Vict. c. cxiii	19 July 1887
An Act to confirm a Provisional Order of the Local Government Board for Ireland constituting the Township of Killiney and Ballybrack an Urban Sanitary District.
	Killiney and Ballybrack Township Provisional Order 1887 Killiney and Ballybrack Township. Provisional Order.	
Whitehaven Harbour and Dock Act 1887	50 & 51 Vict. c. cxiv	19 July 1887
An Act to authorise the Trustees of the Town and Harbour of Whitehaven to make arrangements with their Bondholders and other Creditors and for other purposes.
Trent (Burton-upon-Trent and Humber) Navigation Act 1887	50 & 51 Vict. c. cxv	19 July 1887
An Act to provide for the improvement and maintenance of the Navigation of the River Trent from Wilden Ferry in the counties of Derby and Leicester or one of them to Gainsborough in the county of Lincoln and for other purposes.
Isle of Wight Central Railway Act 1887	50 & 51 Vict. c. cxvi	19 July 1887
An Act to amalgamate the undertakings of the Cowes and Newport the Isle of Wight (Newport Junction) and the Ryde and Newport Railway Companies; and for other purposes.
Pudsey Gas Act 1887	50 & 51 Vict. c. cxvii	19 July 1887
An Act to enable the Pudsey Coal Gas Company to raise further capital; and for other purposes.
Municipal Corporation of Belfast Act 1887	50 & 51 Vict. c. cxviii	19 July 1887
An Act to amend the Municipal Corporations (Ireland) Act (Note: Municipal Corporations (Ireland) Act 1840 (3 & 4 Vict. c. 108)) so far as relates to the Borough of Belfast.
Education Department Provisional Order Confirmation (Christchurch) Act 1887	50 & 51 Vict. c. cxix	19 July 1887
An Act to confirm a Provisional Order made by the Education Department under the Elementary Education Act, 1870, (Note: Elementary Education Act 1870 (33 & 34 Vict. c. 75)) to enable the School Board for Christchurch (extra municipal), Monmouth, to put in force the Lands Clauses Consolidation Act, 1845, (Note: Lands Clauses Consolidation Act 1845 (8 & 9 Vict. c. 18)) and the Acts amending the same.
	Christchurch Order 1887 The School Board for Christchurch (Extra Municipal), County of Monmouth. Provisional Order for putting in force the Lands Clauses Consolidation Act, 1845.	
Education Department Provisional Order Confirmation (London) Act 1887	50 & 51 Vict. c. cxx	19 July 1887
An Act to confirm a Provisional Order made by the Education Department under the Elementary Education Act, 1870, to enable the School Board for London to put in force the Lands Clauses Consolidation Act, 1845, and the Acts amending the same.
	London Order 1887 The School Board for London. Provisional Order for putting in force the Lands Clauses Consolidation Act, 1845.	
Potter's Patent Act 1887	50 & 51 Vict. c. cxxi	19 July 1887
An Act for rendering valid certain Letters Patent granted to Richard Potter for Improvements in Furnaces for melting Glass.
Local Government Board's Provisional Orders Confirmation (No. 4) Act 1887	50 & 51 Vict. c. cxxii	19 July 1887
An Act to confirm certain Provisional Orders of the Local Government Board relating to the Local Government District of Buxton, the Borough of Halifax, and the Local Government Districts of Otley, Southwick, and Sowerby Bridge.
	Buxton Order 1887 Provisional Order for altering the Buxton Local Board Act, 1873. (Note: Buxton Local Board Act 1873 (36 & 37 Vict. c. lvi))	
	Halifax Order 1887 Provisional Order for altering certain Local Acts. (Note: Halifax Park and Improvement Act 1858 (21 & 22 Vict. c. xci)) (Note: Halifax Extension and Improvement Act 1865 (28 & 29 Vict. c. cxl))	
	Otley Order 1887 Provisional Order for altering the Otley Local Board Act, 1885. (Note: Otley Local Board Act 1885 (48 & 49 Vict. c. cxci))	
	Southwick Order 1887 Provisional Order for diminishing the Local Government District of Southwick.	
	Sowerby Bridge Order 1887 Provisional Order for altering the Sowerby Bridge Gas Act, 1861. (Note: Sowerby Bridge Gas Act 1861 (24 & 25 Vict. c. lxxx))	
Tramways Orders Confirmation (No. 2) Act 1887	50 & 51 Vict. c. cxxiii	19 July 1887
An Act to confirm certain Provisional Orders made by the Board of Trade under the Tramways Act, 1870, (Note: Tramways Act 1870 (33 & 34 Vict. c. 78)) relating to Dudley, Netherton, Old Hill, and Cradley Tramways, Newport Pagnell and District Tramways, Norwich Tramways, Wolverton and Stony Stratford Tramways (Deanshanger Extension), and Worcester Tramways.
	Dudley, Netherton Old Hill and Cradley Tramways Order 1887 Order authorising the construction of Tramways in the parishes of Dudley in the county of Worcester and Rowley Regis in the county of Stafford.	
	Newport Pagnell and District Tramways Order 1887 Order authorising the construction of Tramways in the parishes of Newport Pagnell Lathbury Sherington Emberton and Olney all in the county of Buckingham.	
	Norwich Tramways Order 1887 Order authorising the construction of Tramways in the city and county of the city of Norwich and the parish of Thorpe Saint Andrew in the county of Norfolk.	
	Wolverton and Stony Stratford (Deanshanger Extension) Tramways Order 1887 Order authorising the construction of Tramways in the parishes of Stony Stratford in the county of Buckingham and Cosgrove and Passenham in the county of Northampton.	
	Worcester Tramways Order 1887 Order authorising the Construction of Additional Tramways in the City of Worcester.	
Water Orders Confirmation Act 1887	50 & 51 Vict. c. cxxiv	19 July 1887
An Act to confirm certain Provisional Orders made by the Board of Trade under the Gas and Water Works Facilities Act, 1870, relating to Beverley Water, Freshwater and Yarmouth Water, Hoylake and West Kirby Water, Poole Water, and West Lulworth Water.
	Beverley Waterworks Order 1887 Order empowering the Beverley Waterworks Company to raise additional Capital.	
	Freshwater and Yarmouth Water Order 1887 Order conferring powers for the construction and maintenance of Waterworks, and the supply of Water within the parishes of Freshwater, Yarmouth, Thorley and Shalfleet, in the Isle of Wight in the county of Southampton.	
	Hoylake and West Kirby Water Order 1887 Order empowering the Hoylake and West Kirby Gas and Water Company Limited to raise additional capital.	
	Poole Water Order 1887 Order empowering the Poole Waterworks Company to raise additional Capital.	
	West Lulworth Water Order 1887 Order empowering Reginald Joseph Weld and his successors to maintain Waterworks and to supply Water within the Parish of West Lulworth in the County of Dorset.	
Gas Orders Confirmation Act 1887	50 & 51 Vict. c. cxxv	19 July 1887
An Act to confirm certain Provisional Orders made by the Board of Trade under the Gas and Water Works Facilities Act, 1870, relating to Bedford Gas, Long Melford Gas, Musselburgh Gas, Penmaenmawr Gas, and Portsea Gas.
	Bedford Gas Order 1887 Order empowering the Bedford Gas Light Company to raise additional capital.	
	Long Melford Gas Order 1887 Order conferring powers for the maintenance and continuance of Gasworks, and for the manufacture and supply of Gas in the parish of Long Melford in the county of Suffolk.	
	Musselburgh Gas Order 1887 Order empowering the Musselburgh Gas Light Company to maintain and continue gasworks, and to make and supply gas in the burgh of Musselburgh, and in other parts of the parish of Inveresk in the county of Mid-Lothian.	
	Penmaenmawr Gas Order 1887 Order conferring powers for the maintenance and continuance of gasworks and for the manufacture and supply of gas in the local board district of Dwygyfylchi in the county of Carnarvon.	
	Portsea Gas Order 1887 Order empowering the Portsea Island Gaslight Company to purchase additional lands to construct and maintain additional works and for other purposes.	
Liskeard and Caradon Railway Act 1887	50 & 51 Vict. c. cxxvi	19 July 1887
An Act for conferring further powers on the Liskeard and Caradon Railway Company in relation to their undertaking and for authorising arrangements between them and other railway companies and for other purposes.
Belfast Main Drainage Act 1887	50 & 51 Vict. c. cxxvii	19 July 1887
An Act to extend the powers of the mayor aldermen and burgesses of the borough of Belfast for the purification of the River Lagan and for the construction of works in connexion therewith and for other purposes.
Tunbridge Wells Gas Act 1887	50 & 51 Vict. c. cxxviii	19 July 1887
An Act for the granting of further powers to the Tunbridge Wells Gas Company.
Cathcart District Railway Act 1887	50 & 51 Vict. c. cxxix	19 July 1887
An Act to authorise the Cathcart District Railway Company to construct a railway from their authorised railway at New Cathcart to join the Caledonian Railway at Strathbungo to revive the powers and extend the time for the compulsory purchase of lands for and to extend the time for the completion of their authorised railway No. 1 to abandon their authorised railway No. 3 to raise further capital and for other purposes.
Furness Railway Act 1887	50 & 51 Vict. c. cxxx	19 July 1887
An Act for conferring further powers on the Furness Railway Company in relation to their undertaking and for other purposes.
London and North Western Railway Act 1887	50 & 51 Vict. c. cxxxi	19 July 1887
An Act for conferring further powers upon the London and North-Western Railway Company in relation to their own undertaking and other undertakings in which they are interested jointly with other companies and also for conferring powers upon the Great Western Railway Company the Lancashire and Yorkshire Railway Company and other railway companies in relation to such other undertakings and for amalgamating with their undertaking the undertaking of the Cromford and High Peak Railway Company and for other purposes.
Bradford Corporation (Various Powers) Act 1887 (repealed)	50 & 51 Vict. c. cxxxii	19 July 1887
An Act to enable the mayor aldermen and burgesses of the borough of Bradford to establish and maintain a "Conditioning House" for ascertaining and certifying on behalf of persons so desiring the weight length quality and condition of articles of merchandise used in the Bradford worsted trade and the true weight character quality and condition of wools; to authorize the transfer of the Bradford Fever Hospital to the said mayor aldermen and burgesses; and for other purposes. (Repealed by West Yorkshire Act 1980 (c. xiv))
Freshwater, Yarmouth and Newport Railway (Deviations) Act 1887	50 & 51 Vict. c. cxxxiii	19 July 1887
An Act to authorise the Freshwater Yarmouth and Newport Railway Company to deviate portions of their authorised railway and for other purposes.
Newport Waterworks Act 1887	50 & 51 Vict. c. cxxxiv	19 July 1887
An Act to enable the Newport and Pillgwenlly Waterworks Company to construct additional Works and raise additional Capital and for other purposes.
St. Pancras Loans Amendment Act 1887	50 & 51 Vict. c. cxxxv	19 July 1887
An Act to amend the Saint Pancras Loans Act 1879 (Note: Saint Pancras Loans Act 1879 (42 & 43 Vict. c. xxxix)) and for other purposes.
Metropolitan Railway Act 1887	50 & 51 Vict. c. cxxxvi	19 July 1887
An Act to confer further powers upon the Metropolitan Railway Company with reference to their undertaking and their surplus lands and other matters; and for other purposes.
Clissold Park (Stoke Newington) Act 1887 (repealed)	50 & 51 Vict. c. cxxxvii	19 July 1887
An Act to authorise the acquisition of Clissold Park, Stoke Newington, and its utilisation for public purposes. (Repealed by London County Council (General Powers) Act 1908 (8 Edw. 7. c. cvii))
Great North of Scotland Railway (Further Powers) Act 1887	50 & 51 Vict. c. cxxxviii	19 July 1887
An Act to confer further powers on the Great North of Scotland Railway Company.
Mersey Docks and Harbour Board (Overhead Railways) Act 1887 (repealed)	50 & 51 Vict. c. cxxxix	19 July 1887
An Act to revive the Powers for the compulsory purchase of Lands for and to extend the time limited for the completion of the Railways authorised by the Mersey Docks and Harbour Board (Overhead Railways) Act 1882; (Note: Mersey Docks and Harbour Board (Overhead Railways) Act 1882 (45 & 46 Vict. c. cciv)) and to authorise the Mersey Docks and Harbour Board to make and maintain additional Overhead Railways; and for other purposes. (Repealed by Liverpool Overhead Railway Act 1956 (4 & 5 Eliz. 2. c. lxxxii))
Plymouth, Devonport and South Western Junction Railway Act 1887	50 & 51 Vict. c. cxl	19 July 1887
An Act to empower the Plymouth Devonport and South Western Junction Railway Company to attach a preference to part of their authorised Capital and to vary their borrowing powers and for other purposes.
Borough of Portsmouth, Kingston, Fratton and Southsea Tramways Act 1887	50 & 51 Vict. c. cxli	19 July 1887
An Act for providing for the release of a portion of the money deposited in respect of the application to Parliament for the Borough of Portsmouth Kingston Fratton and Southsea Tramways Act 1883; (Note: Borough of Portsmouth Kingston Fratton and Southsea Tramways Act 1883 (46 & 47 Vict. c. clxxxvii)) and for other purposes.
St. Austell Valleys Railway and Dock Act 1887 (repealed)	50 & 51 Vict. c. cxlii	19 July 1887
An Act for incorporating the St. Austell Valleys Railway and Dock Company and authorising them to purchase the St. Austell and Pentewan Railway and to convert and maintain the same and to make and maintain new Railways and Works in the county of Cornwall in connection therewith and to purchase and maintain Pentewan Dock and for other purposes. (Repealed by St. Austell Valleys Railway and Dock (Abandonment) Act 1892 (55 & 56 Vict. c. xxxv))
Burry Port and North Western Junction Railway Amendment Act 1887 (repealed)	50 & 51 Vict. c. cxliii	8 August 1887
An Act to extend the time for the compulsory purchase of lands for and for the completion of the railways authorised by the Burry Port and North-western Junction Railway Act 1876 (Note: Burry Port and North Western Junction Railway Act 1876 (39 & 40 Vict. c. lxxiii)) and the Burry Port and North-western Junction Railway Amendment Act 1881. (Note: Burry Port and North Western Junction Railway Amendment Act 1881 (44 & 45 Vict. c. liv)) (Repealed by Burry Port and North Western Junction Railway (Abandonment) Act 1889 (52 & 53 Vict. c. cliii))
Cowdenbeath Water Supply Confirmation Act 1887	50 & 51 Vict. c. cxliv	8 August 1887
An Act to confirm a Provisional Order under the Public Health (Scotland) Act, 1867, (Note: Public Health (Scotland) Act 1867 (30 & 31 Vict. c. 101)) relating to Cowdenbeath Water.
	Cowdenbeath Water Order 1887 Cowdenbeath Water. Public Health (Scotland) Act, 1867. (30 & 31 Vict. c. 101.) Provisional Order.	
Duntocher and Dalmuir Water Supply Confirmation Act 1887	50 & 51 Vict. c. cxlv	8 August 1887
An Act to confirm a Provisional Order under the Public Health (Scotland) Act, 1867, relating to Duntocher and Dalmuir Water.
	Duntocher and Dalmuir Water Order 1887 Duntocher and Dalmuir Water. Public Health (Scotland) Act, 1867. (30 & 31 Vict. c. 101.) Provisional Order.	
Midland Great Western Railway of Ireland Act 1887 (repealed)	50 & 51 Vict. c. cxlvi	8 August 1887
An Act to confer further powers on the Midland Great Western Railway of Ireland Company. (Repealed by Statute Law (Repeals) Act 2013 (c. 2))
Tees Conservancy (No. 2) Act 1887	50 & 51 Vict. c. cxlvii	8 August 1887
An Act for enabling the Tees Conservancy Commissioners to consolidate their debt by the creation and issue of Debenture Stock and to raise further moneys and for amending the Tees Conservancy Acts and for other purposes.
National Provident Institution Act 1887 (repealed)	50 & 51 Vict. c. cxlviii	8 August 1887
An Act for enabling the National Provident Institution to sue and be sued and for other purposes. (Repealed by National Provident Institution Act 1910 (10 Edw. 7 & 1 Geo. 5. c. ix))
Willesden Local Board Act 1887 (repealed)	50 & 51 Vict. c. cxlix	8 August 1887
An Act for enabling the Local Board for the District of Willesden in the County of Middlesex to appoint building inspectors to be paid by means of fees for extending the powers of the Board with respect to the regulation of the width of streets and the lines of frontage therein and with respect to the making of bye-laws and with respect to infectious diseases; and for other purposes. (Repealed by Local Law (North West London Boroughs) Order 1965 (SI 1965/533))
East Huntingdonshire Water Act 1887	50 & 51 Vict. c. cl	8 August 1887
An Act for incorporating the East Huntingdonshire Water Company and empowering them to construct Works and supply Water and for other purposes.
Local Government Board (Ireland) Provisional Orders Confirmation (Dublin, &c.) Act 1887	50 & 51 Vict. c. cli	8 August 1887
An Act to confirm certain Provisional Orders of the Local Government Board for Ireland relating to a New Street in Dublin, and to Grand Jury Cess in the county and borough of Wexford, and to Waterworks in Strabane.
	City of Dublin (New Street) Provisional Order 1887 City of Dublin—New Street. Provisional Order.	
	Wexford (Town) Provisional Order 1887 Town of Wexford. Provisional Order.	
	Strabane Water Works Provisional Order 1887 Strabane Water Works. Provisional Order.	
Darwen Corporation Act 1887	50 & 51 Vict. c. clii	8 August 1887
An Act to alter the names of the borough and of the Corporation of Over Darwen; to extend the limits of gas supply of the Corporation, and to confer upon them further powers in relation to their water and gas undertakings; to make further provision for the improvement and good government of the borough; to authorise the creation of Corporation stock; and for other purposes.
Weymouth and Melcombe Regis Corporation Act 1887	50 & 51 Vict. c. cliii	8 August 1887
An Act to enable the Mayor Aldermen and Burgesses of the Borough of Weymouth and Melcombe Regis to make a new Pier and new Streets and Street Improvements, and to make further provision for the improvement and good government of the borough; and for other purposes.
Caledonian Railway Act 1887	50 & 51 Vict. c. cliv	8 August 1887
An Act for enabling the Caledonian Railway Company to widen and extend the lines leading into their Central Station in Glasgow, to make a Branch Railway to Midcalder, to open their Kinbuck Tunnel, to acquire lands there and at Aberdeen, and to raise additional money; for extending the time for completing a Railway in the parish of Rutherglen; for making further provision regarding their lands at Blythswoodholm; for making certain alterations on their Officers and Servants Provident Fund; for carrying out certain arrangements between them and the Montrose Harbour Trustees; and for other purposes.
Plymouth Corporation Act 1887	50 & 51 Vict. c. clv	8 August 1887
An Act to empower the Corporation of Plymouth to make additional Waterworks and to create and issue Corporation Stock and for other purposes.
Metropolitan District Railway Act 1887	50 & 51 Vict. c. clvi	8 August 1887
An Act to confer further powers on the Metropolitan District Railway Company and for other purposes.
Gas and Water Orders Confirmation Act 1887	50 & 51 Vict. c. clvii	8 August 1887
An Act to confirm certain Provisional Orders made by the Board of Trade under the Gas and Water Works Facilities Act, 1870, relating to Caterham and District Gas, Sunbury Gas, and Stowmarket Water.
	Caterham and District Gas Order 1887 Order empowering the Caterham and District Gaslight and Coke Company, Limited, to maintain and continue Gasworks, to purchase additional land, to construct additional works, and to make and supply gas in the parishes of Caterham, Warlingham, Chelsham, Chaldon, and Farley, and in parts of the parishes of Coulsdon and Tandridge, all in the County of Surrey.	
	Sunbury Gas Order 1887 Order empowering the Sunbury Gas Consumers Company (Limited) to maintain and continue Gasworks and to manufacture and supply Gas within the Parishes of Sunbury Littleton Hanworth Feltham and a portion of Ashford all in the County of Middlesex.	
	Stowmarket Water Order 1887 Order authorising the Construction and Maintenance of Waterworks and the Supply of Water within the Parishes of Stowmarket and Stow-Upland in the County of Suffolk.	
Pier and Harbour Order Confirmation (No. 2) Act 1887	50 & 51 Vict. c. clviii	8 August 1887
An Act to confirm a Provisional Order made by the Board of Trade under the General Pier and Harbour Act, 1861, relating to Boscombe.
	Boscombe Pier Order 1887 Order for the construction maintenance and regulation of a Pier at Boscombe in the parish of Christchurch in the county of Southampton.	
Local Government Board (Ireland) Provisional Orders Confirmation (Ballyshannon, &c.) Act 1887	50 & 51 Vict. c. clix	8 August 1887
An Act to confirm certain Provisional Orders of the Local Government Board for Ireland relating to Waterworks in Ballyshannon, Greencastle, and Kinlough.
	Ballyshannon Waterworks Provisional Order 1887 Ballyshannon Waterworks. Provisional Order.	
	Greencastle and Upper Whitehouse Waterworks Provisional Order 1887 Greencastle and Upper Whitehouse Waterworks. Provisional Order.	
	Kinlough Waterworks Provisional Order 1887 Kinlough Waterworks. Provisional Order.	
Banbury and Cheltenham Direct Railway Act 1887	50 & 51 Vict. c. clx	8 August 1887
An Act to empower the Banbury and Cheltenham Direct Railway Company to abandon certain of their authorised railways; to confer further powers upon them with reference to capital; and for other purposes.
Great Eastern Railway (General Powers) Act 1887	50 & 51 Vict. c. clxi	8 August 1887
An Act for conferring further powers upon the Great Eastern Railway Company and for authorising a lease to that Company of the Ely and Newmarket Railway; and for other purposes.
Orkney Harbours Act 1887 (repealed)	50 & 51 Vict. c. clxii	8 August 1887
An Act for consolidating under one management the Harbours and Piers of Kirkwall, Scapa and Holm, and of Gill, Whitehall (Stronsay) and Kettletoft, in the county of Orkney; for the amendment of the Acts and Provisional Orders relating to those harbours and piers; and for other purposes. (Repealed by Orkney Islands Council Order Confirmation Act 1978 (c. iv))
Reading Corporation Act 1887	50 & 51 Vict. c. clxiii	8 August 1887
An Act to extend the Boundaries of the Borough of Reading and for other purposes.
Shanklin and Chale Railway Act 1887	50 & 51 Vict. c. clxiv	8 August 1887
An Act to authorise the Shanklin and Chale Railway Company to make certain branch railways in connection with their authorized railway in the Isle of Wight; and for other purposes.
East London Railway (Capital) Act 1887	50 & 51 Vict. c. clxv	8 August 1887
An Act to give effect to a scheme for the consolidation and conversion of the Capital of the East London Railway Company made under section 32 of the East London Railway Act 1882 (Note: East London Railway Act 1882 (45 & 46 Vict. c. clxxxi)) and for other purposes.
Croydon Gas Act 1887 (repealed)	50 & 51 Vict. c. clxvi	8 August 1887
An Act to amend section 12 of the Croydon Gas Act 1877. (Note: Croydon Gas Act 1877 (40 & 41 Vict. c. clxxvi)) (Repealed by Croydon Gas Order 1926 (SR&O 1926/999))
Liverpool Waterworks and Improvement Act 1887	50 & 51 Vict. c. clxvii	8 August 1887
An Act to amend the Liverpool Waterworks Acts; to authorise an Improvement of Chisenhale Street; and for other purposes.
Brighton and Dyke Railway Act 1887	50 & 51 Vict. c. clxviii	8 August 1887
An Act to extend the time for completing and opening the Brighton and Dyke Railway.
Kingstown and Kingsbridge Junction Railway Act 1887 (repealed)	50 & 51 Vict. c. clxix	8 August 1887
An Act to authorise the Construction of Railways from or near the Booterstown Station of the Dublin Wicklow and Wexford Railway Company to the Great Southern and Western Railway at Inchicore with Junctions to connect the same with other Railways; and for other purposes. (Repealed by Kingstown and Kingsbridge Junction Railway (Abandonment) Act 1898 (61 & 62 Vict. c. ccxlvi))
Kingsbridge and Salcombe Railway (Extension of Time) Act 1887	50 & 51 Vict. c. clxx	8 August 1887
An Act to revive and extend the time for purchasing Lands and completing the Railways and Works authorised by the Kingsbridge and Salcombe Railway Act 1882; (Note: Kingsbridge and Salcombe Railway Act 1882 (45 & 46 Vict. c. clx)) and for other purposes.
South Wales Colliery Company (Limited) Act 1887	50 & 51 Vict. c. clxxi	8 August 1887
An Act to extend the powers of the South Wales Colliery Company (Limited).
Thames Tunnel (Blackwall) Act 1887	50 & 51 Vict. c. clxxii	8 August 1887
An Act for enabling the Metropolitan Board of Works to make a new means of communication across the River Thames by means of a Tunnel or Subway at Blackwall.
Clyde Ardrishaig and Crinan Railway Act 1887 (repealed)	50 & 51 Vict. c. clxxiii	8 August 1887
An Act for the construction of certain Railways between the Holy Loch near Dunoon and Lochgilphead Ardrishaig and Crinan Loch with Piers in connection therewith all in the county of Argyll and for other purposes. (Repealed by Clyde, Ardrishaig and Crinan Railway (Abandonment) Act 1892 (55 & 56 Vict. c. xii))
Wolverhampton Corporation Act 1887 (repealed)	50 & 51 Vict. c. clxxiv	8 August 1887
An Act to make better provision for the management and maintenance of the Free Library the Gallery of Art and School of Science and Art in the Borough of Wolverhampton. (Repealed by Wolverhampton Corporation Act 1969 (c. lx))
Cleveland Extension Mineral Railway Act 1887	50 & 51 Vict. c. clxxv	8 August 1887
An Act to revive and extend the powers of the Cleveland Extension Mineral Railway Company.
Pontypridd Caerphilly and Newport Railway Act 1887	50 & 51 Vict. c. clxxvi	8 August 1887
An Act to authorise the Pontypridd Caerphilly and Newport Railway Company to construct a Railway in the counties of Glamorgan and Monmouth in substitution for the Railway authorised by their Act of 1882 (Note: Pontypridd, Caerphilly and Newport Railway Act 1882 (45 & 46 Vict. c. cxcix)) and for other purposes.
Greenock and Port Glasgow Tramways Act 1887	50 & 51 Vict. c. clxxvii	8 August 1887
An Act to authorise the construction of Street Tramways in the Burghs of Greenock and Port Glasgow in the County of Renfrew and for other purposes.
Sheffield Corporation (Water) Act 1887 (repealed)	50 & 51 Vict. c. clxxviii	8 August 1887
An Act to provide for vesting the undertaking of the Company of Proprietors of the Sheffield Waterworks in the Mayor Aldermen and Burgesses of the borough of Sheffield; and for other purposes. (Repealed by Sheffield Corporation (Consolidation) Act 1918 (8 & 9 Geo. 5. c. lxi))
Local Government Board's Provisional Orders Confirmation (No. 5) Act 1887	50 & 51 Vict. c. clxxix	23 August 1887
An Act to confirm certain Provisional Orders of the Local Government Board relating to the Local Government Districts of Chesham and Hindley, the City of Norwich, and the Richmond and West Kent Main Sewerage Districts.
	Chesham Order 1887 Provisional Order under Section 304 of the Public Health Act, 1875.	
	Hindley Order 1887 Provisional Order to enable the Sanitary Authority for the Urban Sanitary District of Hindley to put in force the Compulsory Clauses of the Lands Clauses Consolidation Acts.	
	Norwich Order 1887 Provisional Order to enable the Urban Sanitary Authority for the City of Norwich to put in force the Compulsory Clauses of the Lands Clauses Consolidation Acts.	
	Richmond Main Sewerage Order 1887 Provisional Order for forming a United District under Sec. 279 of the Public Health Act, 1875.	
	West Kent Main Sewerage Order 1887 Provisional Order for altering certain Local Acts and a Confirming Act. (Note: Local Government Board's Provisional Orders Confirmation (No. 7) Act 1886 (50 Vict. c. xv))	
Local Government Board's Provisional Orders Confirmation (No. 7) Act 1887	50 & 51 Vict. c. clxxx	23 August 1887
An Act to confirm certain Provisional Orders of the Local Government Board relating to the Borough of Blackpool, the Improvement Act District of Bournemouth, the Borough of Dewsbury and the Local Government District of Heckmondwike, and the Improvement Act Districts of Milford, Rhyl, and West Worthing.
	Blackpool Order 1887 Provisional Order for altering certain Local Acts.	
	Bournemouth Order 1887 Provisional Order for altering the Bournemouth Improvement Act, 1856. (Note: Bournemouth Improvement Act 1856 (19 & 20 Vict. c. xc))	
	Dewsbury and Heckmondwike Order 1887 Provisional Order for altering the Dewsbury and Heckmondwike Waterworks Act, 1876. (Note: Dewsbury and Heckmondwike Waterworks Act 1876 (39 & 40 Vict. c. clxxxv))	
	Milford Order 1887 Provisional Order for partially repealing and altering the Milford Improvement Act, 1857. (Note: Milford Improvement Act 1857 (20 & 21 Vict. c. lxxiv))	
	Rhyl Order 1887 Provisional Order for partially repealing and altering certain Local Acts and a Confirming Act. (Note: Local Government Board's Provisional Orders Confirmation (No. 9) Act 1882 (45 & 46 Vict. c. ciii))	
	West Worthing Order 1887 Provisional Order for partially repealing and altering the West Worthing Improvement Act, 1865. (Note: West Worthing Improvement Act 1865 (28 & 29 Vict. c. xxvii))	
Didcot Newbury and Southampton Railway (Extension of Time) Act 1887	50 & 51 Vict. c. clxxxi	23 August 1887
An Act to confer further powers on the Didcot Newbury and Southampton Railway Company.
Easingwold Railway Act 1887	50 & 51 Vict. c. clxxxii	23 August 1887
An Act for authorising the construction of a Railway in the North Riding of the County of York to be called the Easingwold Railway and for other purposes.
Peckham and East Dulwich Tramways Act 1887	50 & 51 Vict. c. clxxxiii	23 August 1887
An Act for conferring further powers on the Peckham and East Dulwich Tramways Company.
Westminster (Parliament Street, &c.) Improvements Act 1887	50 & 51 Vict. c. clxxxiv	23 August 1887
An Act to authorise the widening of Parliament Street Charles Street and Delahay Street and the making of new streets and the taking of lands in the Parish of Saint Margaret Westminster in the City of Westminster and County of Middlesex and for other purposes.
Welshpool and Llanfair Railway Act 1887 (repealed)	50 & 51 Vict. c. clxxxv	23 August 1887
An Act to incorporate a company for the construction of a railway from Welshpool to Llanfair in the county of Montgomery and for other purposes. (Repealed by Welshpool and Llanfair Railway (Abandonment) Act 1892 (55 & 56 Vict. c. ii))
Tees Conservancy (No. 1) Act 1887	50 & 51 Vict. c. clxxxvi	23 August 1887
An Act for limiting the liabilities of the Tees Conservancy Commissioners with respect to damage to lands arising from floods from the River Tees through or over their river banks and other works; and for other purposes.
Bankruptcy Offices Site Act 1887	50 & 51 Vict. c. clxxxvii	23 August 1887
An Act for the acquisition of Property and the provision of new Buildings for the Bankruptcy Department.
Dublin, Wicklow and Wexford Railway (City of Dublin Junction Railways) Amendment Act 1887	50 & 51 Vict. c. clxxxviii	23 August 1887
An Act to make further provision with reference to the capital and undertaking of the City of Dublin Junction Railways authorised by the Dublin Wicklow and Wexford Railway (City of Dublin Junction Railways) Act 1884 (Note: Dublin, Wicklow and Wexford Railway (City of Dublin Junction Railways) Act 1884 (47 & 48 Vict. c. clxxxii)) and for other purposes.
Lough and River Erne Navigation Act 1887	50 & 51 Vict. c. clxxxix	23 August 1887
An Act for further extending the time for the completion of the works authorised by the Drainage and Improvement of Lands Supplemental Act (Ireland) 1880 (Note: Drainage and Improvement of Lands Supplemental Act (Ireland) 1880 (43 & 44 Vict. c. cciv)) as extended by the Commissioners of Public Works in Ireland.
Easton and Church Hope Railway Act 1887	50 & 51 Vict. c. cxc	23 August 1887
An Act to enable the Easton and Church Hope Railway Company to alter the levels of a portion of their existing railway; to abandon a portion of their authorised railway; to construct new railways, and for other purposes.
Chew Valley Tramway Act 1887 (repealed)	50 & 51 Vict. c. cxci	23 August 1887
An Act for incorporating the Chew Valley Tramway Company and empowering them to construct a Tramway and other works in the County of Somerset and for other purposes. (Repealed by Chew Valley Tramway (Abandonment) Act 1891 (54 & 55 Vict. c. iv))
Brighton, Rottingdean and Newhaven Direct Railway Act 1887 (repealed)	50 & 51 Vict. c. cxcii	23 August 1887
An Act to authorise the Brighton Rottingdean and Newhaven Direct Railway Company to make a Railway in Brighton in connexion with their authorised Railway, and for other purposes. (Repealed by Brighton, Rottingdean and Newhaven Direct Railway (Abandonment) Act 1894 (57 & 58 Vict. c. cxliv))
Mersey Railway Act 1887	50 & 51 Vict. c. cxciii	23 August 1887
An Act to authorise the Mersey Railway Company to extend their Railway in Liverpool and Birkenhead and for other purposes.
Lynton Railway Act 1887 (repealed)	50 & 51 Vict. c. cxciv	23 August 1887
An Act for conferring further powers on the Lynton Railway Company for the construction of works and for other purposes. (Repealed by Lynton Railway Act 1890 (53 & 54 Vict. c. ccxlv))
South Wales Roads (Abergavenny and Merthyr) Act 1887	50 & 51 Vict. c. cxcv	23 August 1887
An Act to amend an Act intituled "An Act to further amend the law relating to Turnpike Roads in South Wales." (Note: South Wales Roads (Abergavenny and Merthyr) Act 1886 (49 & 50 Vict. c. lii))
Tramways Orders Confirmation (No. 1) Act 1887	50 & 51 Vict. c. cxcvi	23 August 1887
An Act to confirm certain Provisional Orders made by the Board of Trade under the Tramways Act, 1870, (Note: Tramways Act 1870 (33 & 34 Vict. c. 78)) relating to Birmingham Central Tramways (Extension), Bristol Tramways, Burnley and District Tramways, and Burnley and District Tramways Extension, Macclesfield Tramways, Oldham, Ashton-under-Lyne, Hyde, and District Tramways, West Metropolitan Tramways, and Weymouth Tramways.
	Birmingham Central Tramways (Extension) Order 1887 Order authorising the construction of Tramways in the parishes or places of Aston, in the county of Warwick, and King's Norton and Balsall Heath, in the county of Worcester, and for other purposes.	
	Bristol Tramways Order 1887 Order authorising the Bristol Tramways Company (Limited) to construct additional Tramways in the City and County of Bristol and for other purposes.	
	Burnley and District Tramways Extensions Order 1887 Order authorising the use of steam or any mechanical power on certain portions of the tramways authorised by the Burnley and District Tramways Order 1879 and the Burnley and District Tramways Extension Order 1882 and for other purposes.	
	Macclesfield Tramways (Abandonment of Tramways and Release of Deposit) Order 1887 Order authorising the Abandonment of the Tramways authorised by the Macclesfield Tramways Order 1883 and the Release of the Deposit Fund paid into Court on the application for the said Order.	
	Oldham Ashton-under-Lyne Hyde and District Tramways (Release of Deposit) Order 1887 Order authorising the Release of Deposit Fund paid into Court on the application for the Oldham Ashton-under-Lyne Hyde and District Tramways Order 1883.	
	West Metropolitan Tramways Order 1887 Order authorising the use of electrical or any mechanical power other than steam power on the Tramways of the West Metropolitan Tramways Company.	
	Weymouth Tramways Order 1887 Order amending the Weymouth Tramways Order 1884 with respect to the commencement and opening for public traffic of the tramways thereby authorised.	
Kanturk and Newmarket Railway Act 1887	50 & 51 Vict. c. cxcvii	23 August 1887
An Act to authorise the construction of a Railway in the County of Cork to be called the Kanturk and Newmarket Railway and for other purposes.
Crystal Palace Company's Act 1887 (repealed)	50 & 51 Vict. c. cxcviii	23 August 1887
An Act for making further provision respecting the capital and undertaking of the Crystal Palace Company and for other purposes. (Repealed by London County Council (Crystal Palace) Act 1951 (14 & 15 Geo. 6. c. xxviii))
Ogmore Dock and Railway Act 1887 (repealed)	50 & 51 Vict. c. cxcix	16 September 1887
An Act to amend the Ogmore Dock and Railway Act 1883. (Note: Ogmore Dock and Railway Act 1883 (46 & 47 Vict. c. cxcvii)) (Repealed by Ogmore Dock and Railway (Abandonment) Act 1891 (54 & 55 Vict. c. xvii))
West Gloucestershire Water Act 1887	50 & 51 Vict. c. cc	16 September 1887
An Act for extending the limits of supply of the West Gloucestershire Water Company and for conferring further powers on the Company in relation to their undertaking and for other purposes.
Lincoln Horncastle Spilsby and Skegness Railway Act 1887 (repealed)	50 & 51 Vict. c. cci	16 September 1887
An Act to authorise the construction of Railways in Lincolnshire to be called the Lincoln Horncastle Spilsby and Skegness Railway and for other purposes. (Repealed by Lincoln, Horncastle, Spilsby and Skegness Railway (Abandonment) Act 1891 (54 & 55 Vict. c. clxxiv))

=== Private and personal acts ===
Short title	Citation	Royal assent
Long title
Arkwright Estate Act 1887	50 & 51 Vict. c. 1 Pr.	23 August 1887
An Act for vesting the Hampton Court Estate, in the County of Hereford, in Trustees, and for reimbursing John Hungerford Arkwright, Esquire, certain Sums expended by him in the permanent improvement of that Estate.
Gifford's Divorce Act 1887 (Note: This act was not printed by the Queen's Printer.)	50 & 51 Vict. c. 2 Pr.	23 May 1887
An Act to dissolve the Marriage of Harriett Frances Gifford with James Richard Gifford, and to enable her to marry again, and for other purposes.
Hewat's Divorce Act 1887	50 & 51 Vict. c. 3 Pr.	23 May 1887
An Act to dissolve the Marriage of William Hewat (formerly of 102, Saint Stephen's Green South, but now of 18, Westmoreland-street, in the City of Dublin), Merchant, with Agnes Anna Hewat, his now Wife, and to enable him to marry again, and for other purposes.
Atkins's Divorce Act 1887	50 & 51 Vict. c. 4 Pr.	12 July 1887
An Act to dissolve the Marriage of Ringrose Atkins, Of Lower Grange, in the County of Waterford, in Ireland, Esquire, Doctor of Medicine, with Mary Ellen Atkins, his now Wife, and to enable him to marry again, and for other purposes.

=== Sources ===
- The Public General Statutes, Volume 24: 50 & 51 Victoria – 1887. 1887 – via Internet Archive.
- Local and Personal Acts – via Google Books.
- Local and Personal Laws. Vol. 156 – via Google Books.
- Local and Personal Acts – via Google Books.

== See also ==
- List of acts of the Parliament of the United Kingdom
