= Clerical Medical =

British finance company

Clerical Medical Investment Group Limited
- Type: Subsidiary
- Industry: Financial services
- Founded: 1824; 202 years ago
- Headquarters: London, England, UK
- Products: life assurance Pensions; Investments
- Parent: Lloyds Banking Group
- Website: www.clericalmedical.co.uk

Clerical Medical is a British life assurance, pensions and investments company founded in 1824, and a subsidiary of Lloyds Banking Group.

== History ==
Clerical, Medical and General Life Assurance Act 1850
- Act of Parliament
- Parliament of the United Kingdom
- Long title: An Act for better enabling the Clerical, Medical, and General Life Assurance Society to sue and be sued; and to alter certain Provisions of their Deed of Constitution; and to give further Powers to the Society.
- Citation: 13 & 14 Vict. c. ix

Dates
- Royal assent: 17 May 1850

Other legislation
- Repealed by: Clerical, Medical and General Life Assurance Act 1974

Status: Repealed

Text of statute as originally enacted

Clerical Medical and General Life Assurance Act 1887
- Act of Parliament
- Parliament of the United Kingdom
- Long title: An Act to amend the Clerical Medical and General Life Assurance Act, 1850, and to make further provisions in relation to the capital of the Society and to the distribution of profits, and for other purposes.
- Citation: 50 & 51 Vict. c. x

Dates
- Royal assent: 29 March 1887

Other legislation
- Repealed by: Clerical, Medical and General Life Assurance Act 1974

Status: Repealed

Text of statute as originally enacted

In 1824, Dr George Pinckard formed a committee of physicians and members of the clergy which published a pamphlet called 'Prospectus for the Establishment of a new Assurance Office with Improved Arrangements'. On 18 June 1824, the Medical, Clerical and General Life Assurance Society was formed. Pinckard was appointed as Chairman, the Marquis of Huntly as President, and Pinckard's brother Joseph as Resident Secretary and Actuary. A board of directors, which included eight eminent physicians was also appointed. The company's first policy was issued to Richard Pinckard, a nephew of Dr George Pinckard.

In 1855, the company moved its headquarters to Lichfield House in St James's Square, London.

Clerical, Medical and General Life Assurance Act 1961
- Act of Parliament
- Parliament of the United Kingdom
- Long title: An Act to provide for the control and management of the Clerical, Medical and General Life Assurance Society as a Mutual Society; for the substitution of Loan Stock for the Share Capital of the Society; and for other purposes.
- Citation: 9 & 10 Eliz. 2. c. xii

Dates
- Royal assent: 9 May 1961

Other legislation
- Repealed by: HBOS Group Reorganisation Act 2006

Text of statute as originally enacted

Clerical, Medical and General Life Assurance Act 1974
- Act of Parliament
- Parliament of the United Kingdom
- Long title: An Act to provide for the incorporation of the Clerical, Medical and General Life Assurance Society; and for other purposes.
- Citation: 1974 c. xi

Dates
- Royal assent: 9 July 1974

Other legislation
- Repealed by: HBOS Group Reorganisation Act 2006

Status: Repealed

Text of statute as originally enacted

Clerical Medical acquired the General Reversionary and Investment Company in 1913, and in 1920 a merger with the Employers' Liability Assurance Corporation took place. In 1961 by the Clerical, Medical and General Life Assurance Act 1961 (9 & 10 Eliz. 2. c. xii), Clerical Medical became a mutual office.

In 1975, the company moved its head office from St James's Square, London to Bristol.

Following the decision to demutualise the company in 1995, Clerical Medical merged with the Halifax in 1996, and was later absorbed into HBOS plc in 2001.

HBOS was bought by Lloyds TSB Group in January 2009. The resulting company, Lloyds Banking Group, announced in April 2009 that the Clerical Medical brand would eventually be phased out in favour of its Scottish Widows subsidiary.

In 2015, Lloyds Banking Group sold Clerical Medical International (CMI) to offshore life assurance company RL360°.

== Illness and premium ==
In the early 19th century, the following illnesses, lifestyles, injuries, and description of such conditions were recorded and raised the premium for prospective applicants to Clerical Medical, by which the company made profit when clients lived longer than expected.

- "Consumption" (pulmonary tuberculosis)
- Dropsy (oedema)
- "spitting of blood" "vomiting of blood" (lung cancer, pneumonia, tuberculosis)
- "indigestion" "Bilious attacks with spasms" (ulcers, cancer)
- Gout
- Apoplexy "Paralysis and Determination of Blood to the Head"
- Intemperance "drinking ale to excess" "Takes Laudanum"
- "Corpulency" "Fast and short necked" "Lusty and lives rather freely"
- Rupture
- Amputations
- Physical injury "an account of His Grace (Duke of Richmond) to have a Musket Ball lodged in his person from a wound which he received at the Battle of Orthez, and his having, about six or seven years since, been affected with a spitting of blood after being thrown from his Horse when hunting"
