= Greater London Authority (Referendum) Act 1998 =

Act of the Parliament of the United Kingdom

Greater London Authority (Referendum) Act 1998 (Note: Section 13.)
- Act of Parliament
- Parliament of the United Kingdom
- Long title: An Act to make provision for the holding of a referendum on the establishment of a Greater London Authority and for expenditure in preparation for such an Authority; and to confer additional functions on the Local Government Commission for England in connection with the establishment of such an Authority.
- Citation: 1998 c. 3
- Introduced by: John Prescott, Deputy Prime Minister of the United Kingdom (Commons)
- Territorial extent: United Kingdom

Dates
- Royal assent: 23 February 1998
- Commencement: 23 February 1998 (Note: Section 4(b) of the Interpretation Act 1978.)

Status: Current legislation

Text of statute as originally enacted

Revised text of statute as amended

The Greater London Authority (Referendum) Act 1998 (c. 3) is an act of the Parliament of the United Kingdom, which made legal provision for the holding of a non-binding referendum in Greater London on whether there should be a democratically elected Assembly for London and a separately elected Mayor for London.

== Proposal ==
The government published a green paper with the title New Leadership for London in July 1997. This laid out the principles of the GLA: a strong mayor and a "strategic" assembly.

The act legislated for the holding of a non-binding referendum to be held on 7 May 1998 in Greater London on whether there should be a democratically elected London Assembly and a separately elected Mayor for London and legislated for the appointment of a Chief Counting Officer to oversee the referendum.

The detailed proposals were confirmed in a March 1998 white paper entitled A Mayor and Assembly for London which set out the full details of the proposal.

The legislation was supported by the Association of London Government. The Conservative Party criticised the lack of separate votes for a mayor and an assembly.

== Provisions ==
Part I of the act made provision for the referendum. Section 1 provided for a referendum to be held on 7 May 1998, or on such later date as Her Majesty prescribed by Order in Council, on the establishment of a Greater London Authority made up of an elected assembly and a separately elected mayor, with the question set out in the schedule. Section 2 gave the right to vote to those entitled to vote at a local government election in any London borough, and to those entitled to vote at a ward election in the City of London. Section 3 required the Secretary of State to appoint a Chief Counting Officer for Greater London, who was to appoint a counting officer for each London borough and for the City of London. Section 4 provided for the poll to be taken together with any ordinary election of borough councillors held on the same day, and allowed an Order in Council to make further provision about the conduct of the referendum. Section 5 allowed the Secretary of State to pay grants towards the boroughs' referendum expenditure, and section 6 excluded legal proceedings questioning the number of ballot papers counted or votes cast.

Part II of the act (sections 7 to 11) allowed the Secretary of State to direct the Local Government Commission for England to report on the electoral areas into which Greater London should be divided for the election of members of an assembly, the number of members to be elected for each area, and the names of the areas. It set out the procedure for consultation and for draft, final and supplementary reports, and allowed the Secretary of State to give directions and to pay the Commission's costs. Section 12 provided for expenditure and section 13 for the short title.

== The referendum ==
The referendum was held in Greater London on 7 May 1998 on the issue of a Greater London Authority.

=== Referendum question ===
The question that appeared on ballot papers in the referendum was:

Are you in favour of the government’s proposals for a Greater London Authority, made up of an elected mayor and a separately elected assembly?

— Form of ballot paper, Greater London Authority (Referendum) Act 1998, Schedule

The ballot paper permitted a simple YES / NO answer.

=== Counting areas ===
The 32 London boroughs and the City of London were used as the counting areas for the referendum.

== Result ==
All 33 London boroughs voted "Yes" in the referendum.

Greater London Authority referendum, 1998; Result
Choice	Votes	%
Yes	1,230,739	72.01%
No	478,413	27.99%
Valid votes	1,709,172	98.49%
Invalid or blank votes	26,178	1.51%
Total votes	1,735,350	100.00%
Registered voters and turnout	5,016,064	34.60%

== Outcome ==
Following the successful outcome of the vote, the Greater London Authority Act 1999 was passed by the UK Parliament and the authority came into being following elections in 2000.

== See also ==
- Referendums in the United Kingdom
