= West India Loan Act 1879 =

Act of the Parliament of the United Kingdom

West India Loan Act 1879 (Note: Section 1.)
- Act of Parliament
- Parliament of the United Kingdom
- Long title: An Act to provide for the winding up of the West Indian Relief Commission, and for the remission of certain Sums remaining unpaid in respect of Loans by the said Commission.
- Citation: 42 & 43 Vict. c. 16
- Territorial extent: United Kingdom

Dates
- Royal assent: 3 July 1879
- Commencement: 3 July 1879 (Note: The Acts of Parliament (Commencement) Act 1793.)
- Repealed: 25 August 1894

Other legislation
- Amends: See § Repealed enactments
- Repeals/revokes: See § Repealed enactments
- Repealed by: Statute Law Revision Act 1894

Status: Repealed

Text of statute as originally enacted

The West India Loan Act 1879 (42 & 43 Vict. c. 16) was an act of the Parliament of the United Kingdom that provided for the winding up of the West India Relief Commission and the remission of certain sums remaining unpaid in respect of loans made by the commission to persons and colonial governments in the West Indies.

== Provisions ==
=== Repealed enactments ===
Section 4 of the act provided that, upon a declaration by the Treasury under that section, 9 enactments, listed in parts I and II of the second schedule to the act, would be repealed.

==== Part I: West India Loan Acts ====
Part I — West India Loan Acts
Citation	Short title	Description	Extent of repeal
2 & 3 Will. 4. c. 125	Loans for Jamaica, Trinidad, etc. Act 1832	An Act for enabling His Majesty to direct the issue of Exchequer Bills to a limited amount for the purposes and in the manner therein mentioned, and for giving relief to Trinidad, British Guiana, and St. Lucia.	The whole act.
3 & 4 Vict. c. 40	West India Islands Relief Act 1840	An Act to amend two Acts of His late Majesty King William the Fourth, for the relief of certain of Her Majesty's colonies and plantations in the West Indies.	The whole act.
7 & 8 Vict. c. 17	West Indian Islands Relief Act 1844	An Act for giving additional powers to the Commissioners for the relief of certain of Her Majesty's colonies and plantations in the West Indies.	The whole act.
8 & 9 Vict. c. 50	West India Island Relief Act 1845	An Act to facilitate the recovery of loans made by the West India Relief Commissioners.	The whole act.
11 & 12 Vict. c. 38	West India Loans Act 1848	An Act to authorise the West India Relief Commissioners to grant further time for the repayment of monies advanced by them in certain cases.	The whole act.
19 & 20 Vict. c. 35	West India Relief Commissioners Act 1856	An Act to authorise the West India Relief Commissioners to grant further time for the repayment of monies advanced by them in certain cases.	The whole act.

==== Part II: Dominica Loan Acts ====
Part II — Dominica Loan Acts
Citation	Short title	Description	Extent of repeal
5 & 6 Will. 4. c. 51	Dominica, etc., Relief Act 1835	An Act for granting relief to the island of Dominica; and to amend an Act of the second and third years of His present Majesty, for enabling His Majesty to direct the issue of Exchequer Bills to a limited amount for the purposes therein mentioned.	The whole act.
23 & 24 Vict. c. 57	Dominica Loan Act 1860	An Act to authorise an extension of the time for repayment of a loan made by the West India Relief Commissioners to the island of Dominica.	The whole act. (Note: The act was already repealed for "all Her Majesty's Dominions" by the Statute Law Revision Act 1875 (38 & 39 Vict. c. 66).)
30 & 31 Vict. c. 91	Dominica Loan Act 1867	The Dominica Loan Act, 1867.	The whole act.

Part III of the second schedule named a single act, the Jamaica Loan Act 1862 (25 & 26 Vict. c. 55), which section 1 defined for interpretation purposes but which was not among the acts repeal of which section 4 authorised.

== Subsequent developments ==
The whole act was repealed by section 1 of, and the first schedule to, the Statute Law Revision Act 1894 (57 & 58 Vict. c. 56), which came into force on 25 August 1894.
