= List of acts of the Parliament of the United Kingdom from 1879 =

This is a complete list of acts of the Parliament of the United Kingdom for the year 1879.

Note that the first parliament of the United Kingdom was held in 1801; parliaments between 1707 and 1800 were either parliaments of Great Britain or of Ireland). For acts passed up until 1707, see the list of acts of the Parliament of England and the list of acts of the Parliament of Scotland. For acts passed from 1707 to 1800, see the list of acts of the Parliament of Great Britain. See also the list of acts of the Parliament of Ireland.

For acts of the devolved parliaments and assemblies in the United Kingdom, see the list of acts of the Scottish Parliament, the list of acts of the Northern Ireland Assembly, and the list of acts and measures of Senedd Cymru; see also the list of acts of the Parliament of Northern Ireland.

The number shown after each act's title is its chapter number. Acts passed before 1963 are cited using this number, preceded by the year(s) of the reign during which the relevant parliamentary session was held; thus the Union with Ireland Act 1800 is cited as "39 & 40 Geo. 3 c. 67", meaning the 67th act passed during the session that started in the 39th year of the reign of George III and which finished in the 40th year of that reign. Note that the modern convention is to use Arabic numerals in citations (thus "41 Geo. 3" rather than "41 Geo. III"). Acts of the last session of the Parliament of Great Britain and the first session of the Parliament of the United Kingdom are both cited as "41 Geo. 3".

Some of these acts have a short title. Some of these acts have never had a short title. Some of these acts have a short title given to them by later acts, such as by the Short Titles Act 1896.

== 42 & 43 Vict. ==
The sixth session of the 21st Parliament of the United Kingdom, which met from 13 February 1879 until 15 August 1879.

=== Public general acts ===
Short title	Citation	Royal assent
Long title
Spring Assizes Act 1879 (repealed)	42 & 43 Vict. c. 1	14 March 1879
An Act to amend the Law respecting the holding of Assizes. (Repealed by Courts Act 1971 (c. 23))
Consolidated Fund (No. 1) Act 1879 (repealed)	42 & 43 Vict. c. 2	14 March 1879
An Act to apply the sum of Four million two hundred and fifty thousand pounds out of the Consolidated Fund to the service of the year ending on the thirty-first day of March one thousand eight hundred and seventy-nine. (Repealed by Statute Law Revision Act 1894 (57 & 58 Vict. c. 56))
Exchequer Bonds (No. 1) Act 1879 (repealed)	42 & 43 Vict. c. 3	14 March 1879
An Act to raise the sum of Four million two hundred and fifty thousand pounds by Exchequer Bonds, for the service of the year ending on the thirty-first day of March one thousand eight hundred and seventy-nine. (Repealed by Statute Law Revision Act 1894 (57 & 58 Vict. c. 56))
Mutiny Act (Temporary) Continuance Act 1879 (repealed)	42 & 43 Vict. c. 4	21 March 1879
An Act to continue for Three Months the Act of the Session of the forty-first and forty-second years of the reign of Her present Majesty, chapter ten, intituled "An Act for punishing Mutiny and Desertion, and for the better Payment of the Army and their Quarters." (Repealed by Statute Law Revision Act 1894 (57 & 58 Vict. c. 56))
Marine Mutiny Act (Temporary) Continuance Act 1879 (repealed)	42 & 43 Vict. c. 5	21 March 1879
An Act to continue for three months the Act of the Session of the forty-first and forty-second years of the reign of Her present Majesty, chapter eleven, intituled An Act for the Regulation of Her Majesty's Royal Marine Forces while on shore. (Repealed by Statute Law Revision Act 1894 (57 & 58 Vict. c. 56))
District Auditors Act 1879 (repealed)	42 & 43 Vict. c. 6	28 March 1879
An Act to amend the Law with respect to District Auditors. (Repealed by Local Government Act 1933 (23 & 24 Geo. 5. c. 51))
Consolidated Fund (No. 2) Act 1879 (repealed)	42 & 43 Vict. c. 7	28 March 1879
An Act to apply certain Sums out of the Consolidated Fund to the service of the years ending on the thirty-first day of March one thousand eight hundred and seventy-eight, one thousand eight hundred and seventy-nine, and one thousand eight hundred and eighty. (Repealed by Statute Law Revision Act 1894 (57 & 58 Vict. c. 56))
Registration of Births, Deaths, and Marriages (Army) Act 1879	42 & 43 Vict. c. 8	23 May 1879
An Act to make further provision for the Registration of Deaths, Marriages, and Births occurring out of the United Kingdom among officers and soldiers of Her Majesty's Forces, and their families.
Friendly Societies Amendment Act 1879 or the Friendly Societies Act 1879 or the Friendly Societies Act (1875) Amendment Act (repealed)	42 & 43 Vict. c. 9	23 May 1879
An Act to declare the true meaning of Section Thirty of the Friendly Societies Act, 1875. (Note: Friendly Societies Act 1875 (38 & 39 Vict. c. 60)) (Repealed by Friendly Societies Act 1887 (50 & 51 Vict. c. 56))
Assessed Rates Act 1879 (repealed)	42 & 43 Vict. c. 10	23 May 1879
An Act to amend the Poor Rate Assessment and Collection Act, 1869. (Note: Poor Rate Assessment and Collection Act 1869 (32 & 33 Vict. c. 41)) (Repealed for England and Wales by Local Government Act 1966 (c. 42) and for Northern Ireland by Representation of the People Act 1918 (7 & 8 Geo. 5. c. 64))
Bankers' Books Evidence Act 1879	42 & 43 Vict. c. 11	23 May 1879
An Act to amend the Law of Evidence with respect to Bankers' Books.
Poor Law Amendment Act 1879 (repealed)	42 & 43 Vict. c. 12	23 May 1879
An Act to amend the Divided Parishes and Poor Law Amendment Act, 1876. (Repealed by Poor Law Act 1927 (17 & 18 Geo. 5. c. 14))
Petty Customs (Scotland) Abolition Act Amendment Act or the Burgh, Scotland (Petty Customs) Act 1879 (repealed)	42 & 43 Vict. c. 13	23 May 1879
An Act to amend the Act thirty-third and thirty-fourth Victoria, chapter forty-two, for the abolition of Petty Customs. (Repealed by Statute Law Revision Act 1894 (57 & 58 Vict. c. 56))
Consolidated Fund (No. 3) Act 1879 (repealed)	42 & 43 Vict. c. 14	27 May 1879
An Act to apply the sum of Six million six hundred and ninety-four thousand eight hundred and sixteen pounds out of the Consolidated Fund to the service of the year ending on the thirty-first day of March one thousand eight hundred and eighty. (Repealed by Statute Law Revision Act 1894 (57 & 58 Vict. c. 56))
Public Health (Scotland) Act 1867 Amendment Act 1879 or the Public Health (Scotland) Amendment Act 1879 (repealed)	42 & 43 Vict. c. 15	27 May 1879
An Act to amend the Public Health (Scotland) Act, 1867. (Note: Public Health (Scotland) Act 1867 (30 & 31 Vict. c. 101)) (Repealed by Public Health (Scotland) Act 1867 Amendment Act 1882 (45 & 46 Vict. c. 11))
West India Loan Act 1879 (repealed)	42 & 43 Vict. c. 16	3 July 1879
An Act to provide for the winding up of the West Indian Relief Commission, and for the remission of certain Sums remaining unpaid in, respect of Loans by the said Com-. (Repealed by Statute Law Revision Act 1894 (57 & 58 Vict. c. 56))
House of Commons Costs Taxation Act 1879 (repealed)	42 & 43 Vict. c. 17	3 July 1879
An Act to amend the House of Commons Costs Taxation Act, 1847. (Note: House of Commons Costs Taxation Act 1847 (10 & 11 Vict. c. 69)) (Repealed by Parliamentary Costs Act 2006 (c. 37))
Racecourses Licensing Act 1879 or the Racecourse Licensing Act 1879 (repealed)	42 & 43 Vict. c. 18	3 July 1879
An Act for the Licensing of Metropolitan Suburban Racecourses. (Repealed by London Government Act 1963 (c. 33))
Habitual Drunkards Act 1879 (repealed)	42 & 43 Vict. c. 19	3 July 1879
An Act to facilitate the control and cure of Habitual Drunkards. (Repealed for Northern Ireland by Health and Personal Social Services (Northern Ireland) Order 1972 (SI 1972/1265 (N.I. 14)) and for England and Wales and Scotland by Statute Law (Repeals) Act 1976 (c. 16))
Consolidated Fund (No. 4) Act 1879 (repealed)	42 & 43 Vict. c. 20	3 July 1879
An Act to apply the sum of six million five hundred and sixty-seven thousand and twenty-three pounds out of the Consolidated Fund to the service of the year ending on the thirty-first day of March one thousand eight hundred and eighty. (Repealed by Statute Law Revision Act 1894 (57 & 58 Vict. c. 56))
Customs and Inland Revenue Act 1879 (repealed)	42 & 43 Vict. c. 21	3 July 1879
An Act to grant certain Duties of Customs and Inland Revenue, and to amend the Laws relating to Customs and Inland Revenue. (Repealed by Statute Law (Repeals) Act 2008 (c. 12))
Prosecution of Offences Act 1879 (repealed)	42 & 43 Vict. c. 22	3 July 1879
An Act for more effectually providing for the Prosecution of Offences in England, and for other purposes. (Repealed by Prosecution of Offences Act 1884 (47 & 48 Vict. c. 58), Statute Law Revision Act 1894 (57 & 58 Vict. c. 56), Prosecution of Offences Act 1908 (8 Edw. 7. c. 3), Administration of Justice Act 1965 (c. 2), Criminal Procedure (Attendance of Witnesses) Act 1965 (c. 69), Criminal Law Act 1977 (c. 45) and Prosecution of Offences Act 1979 (c. 31))
Hares Preservation (Ireland) Act 1879 (repealed)	42 & 43 Vict. c. 23	3 July 1879
An Act to provide for the Preservation of Hares in Ireland. (Repealed by Game Law Amendment Act (Northern Ireland) 1951 (c. 4 (N.I.)))
Statute Law Revision (Ireland) Act 1879	42 & 43 Vict. c. 24	3 July 1879
An Act for promoting the Revision of the Statute Law of Ireland.
Dispensary Houses (Ireland) Act 1879 (repealed)	42 & 43 Vict. c. 25	21 July 1879
An Act to give facilities for providing Dispensary Houses and Dwelling Houses for Medical Officers of Dispensary Districts in certain parts of Ireland. (Repealed by Health Services Act (Northern Ireland) 1948 (c. 3 (N.I.)))
Salmon Fishery Law Amendment Act 1879 (repealed)	42 & 43 Vict. c. 26	21 July 1879
An Act to amend the Salmon Fishery Act with relation to fixed Engines in Tidal Waters. (Repealed by Salmon and Freshwater Fisheries Act 1923 (13 & 14 Geo. 5. c. 16))
Convention of Royal Burghs (Scotland) Act 1879 (repealed)	42 & 43 Vict. c. 27	21 July 1879
An Act to empower Parliamentary Burghs in Scotland to become members of the Convention of Royal Burghs. (Repealed by Local Government (Scotland) Act 1973 (c. 65))
Convention (Ireland) Act Repeal Act 1879	42 & 43 Vict. c. 28	21 July 1879
An Act to repeal the Convention (Ireland) Act, passed in the Irish Parliament in the thirty-third year of the reign of His late Majesty King George the Third, and to amend and declare the Law in certain cases in respect to Assemblies and Public Meetings.
Confirmation of Marriages on Her Majesty's Ships Act 1879 (repealed)	42 & 43 Vict. c. 29	21 July 1879
An Act to remove doubts as to the validity of certain Marriages of British subjects on board Her Majesty's ships. (Repealed by Foreign Marriage (Amendment) Act 1988 (c. 44))
Sale of Food and Drugs Act Amendment Act 1879 (repealed)	42 & 43 Vict. c. 30	21 July 1879
An Act to amend the Sale of Food and Drugs Act, 1875. (Note: Sale of Food and Drugs Act 1875 (38 & 39 Vict. c. 63)) (Repealed for England and Wales and Scotland by Food and Drugs (Adulteration) Act 1928 (18 & 19 Geo. 5. c. 31) and for Northern Ireland by Food and Drugs Act (Northern Ireland) 1958 (c. 27 (N.I.)))
Public Health (Interments) Act 1879 (repealed)	42 & 43 Vict. c. 31	21 July 1879
An Act to amend the Public Health Act, 1875, (Note: Public Health Act 1875 (38 & 39 Vict. c. 55)) as to Interments. (Repealed by Local Government Act 1972 (c. 70))
Military Prisons Act 1879 or the Army Discipline and Regulation (Commencement) Act 1879 (repealed)	42 & 43 Vict. c. 32	24 July 1879
An Act to bring into force the Army Discipline and Mutiny Act Regulation Act, 1879, and for other purposes. (Repealed by Statute Law Revision Act 1894 (57 & 58 Vict. c. 56) and Statute Law Revision Act 1950 (14 Geo. 6. c. 6))
Army Discipline and Regulation Act 1879 (repealed)	42 & 43 Vict. c. 33	24 July 1879
An Act to amend the Law relating to the Discipline and Regulation of the Army. (Repealed by Army Act 1881 (44 & 45 Vict. c. 58) and Reserve Forces Act 1882 (45 & 46 Vict. c. 48))
Children's Dangerous Performances Act 1879 (repealed)	42 & 43 Vict. c. 34	24 July 1879
An Act to regulate the Employment of Children in places of public amusement in certain cases. (Repealed for England and Wales by Children and Young Persons Act 1932 (22 & 23 Geo. 5. c. 46), for Scotland by Children and Young Persons (Scotland) Act 1932 (22 & 23 Geo. 5. c. 47) and for Northern Ireland by Children and Young Persons Act (Northern Ireland) 1950 (c. 5 (N.I.)))
Public Loans Remission Act 1879 (repealed)	42 & 43 Vict. c. 35	24 July 1879
An Act to remit certain Loans made by the Exchequer Loan Commissioners and the Public Works Loan Commissioners, and by the Irish Exchequer Loan Commissioners and the Commissioners of Public Works in Ireland. (Repealed by Statute Law Revision Act 1894 (57 & 58 Vict. c. 56))
Customs Buildings Act 1879	42 & 43 Vict. c. 36	11 August 1879
An Act for the transfer of property held for the service of Her Majesty's Customs to the Commissioners of Her Majesty's Works and Public Buildings; and for other purposes.
Commons Act 1879	42 & 43 Vict. c. 37	11 August 1879
An Act to amend the Commons Act, 1876.
Slave Trade (East African Courts) Act 1879 (repealed)	42 & 43 Vict. c. 38	11 August 1879
An Act to amend the Slave Trade (East African Courts Act, 1873. (Repealed by Statute Law (Repeals) Act 1986 (c. 12))
Highway Accounts Returns Act 1879 (repealed)	42 & 43 Vict. c. 39	11 August 1879
An Act to amend the law with respect to Returns of Receipts and Expenditure as regards Highways, and to dispense with the verification before Justices of the accounts of Surveyors of Highways. (Repealed by Local Government Act 1933 (23 & 24 Geo. 5. c. 51))
Conveyancing (Scotland) Act 1874 Amendment Act 1879 (repealed)	42 & 43 Vict. c. 40	11 August 1879
An Act to amend the Conveyancing and Land Transfer (Scotland) Act, 1874. (Repealed by Bankruptcy (Scotland) Act 1913 (3 & 4 Geo. 5. c. 20))
Indian Guaranteed Railways Act 1879 (repealed)	42 & 43 Vict. c. 41	11 August 1879
An Act to enable Guaranteed Railway Companies in India and the Secretary of State for India in Council to enter into Agreements with respect to the working of Railways, and with respect to Telegraphs, and to confer upon those Companies additional powers with respect to their undertakings. (Repealed by Statute Law Revision Act 1964 (c. 79))
Valuation of Lands (Scotland) Amendment Act 1879	42 & 43 Vict. c. 42	11 August 1879
An Act to amend the Acts relating to the Valuation of Lands and Heritages in Scotland.
East Indian Railway (Redemption of Annuities) Act 1879 (repealed)	42 & 43 Vict. c. 43	11 August 1879
An Act to enable the Secretary of State in Council of India to create and issue Capital Stock in the United Kingdom in exchange for so much of the Annuity created under the East Indian Railway Company Purchase Act, 1879, and thereby made chargeable on the Revenues of India as may be purchased by the Secretary of State under that Act. (Repealed by East India Loans Act 1937 (1 Edw. 8 & 1 Geo. 6. c. 14))
Lord Clerk Register (Scotland) Act 1879	42 & 43 Vict. c. 44	11 August 1879
An Act to make provision in regard to the office of Lord Clerk Register of Scotland, and for other purposes.
Indian Advance Act 1879 (repealed)	42 & 43 Vict. c. 45	11 August 1879
An Act to authorise the issue of a sum out of the Consolidated Fund by way of loan to the Secretary of State for India. (Repealed by Indian Loan Act 1881 (44 & 45 Vict. c. 54))
Annual Turnpike Acts Continuance Act 1879 (repealed)	42 & 43 Vict. c. 46	11 August 1879
An Act to continue certain Turnpike Acts, and to repeal certain other Turnpike Acts; and for other purposes connected therewith. (Repealed by Statute Law Revision Act 1894 (57 & 58 Vict. c. 56))
Petroleum Act 1879 (repealed)	42 & 43 Vict. c. 47	11 August 1879
An Act to continue and amend the Petroleum Act, 1871. (Note: Petroleum Act 1871 (34 & 35 Vict. c. 105)) (Repealed for England and Wales and Scotland by Petroleum (Consolidation) Act 1928 (18 & 19 Geo. 5. c. 32) and for Northern Ireland by Petroleum (Consolidation) Act (Northern Ireland) 1929 (19 & 20 Geo. 5. c. 13 (N.I.)))
Elementary Education (Industrial Schools) Act 1879 (repealed)	42 & 43 Vict. c. 48	11 August 1879
An Act to amend the Law respecting the Powers of School Boards in relation to Industrial Schools. (Repealed by Children Act 1908 (8 Edw. 7. c. 67))
Summary Jurisdiction Act 1879	42 & 43 Vict. c. 49	11 August 1879
An Act to amend the Law relating to the Summary Jurisdiction of Magistrates. (Repealed for England and Wales by Courts Act 1971 (c. 23))
Bills of Sale (Ireland) Act 1879	42 & 43 Vict. c. 50	11 August 1879
An Act to amend the Law relating to Bills of Sale in Ireland.
Appropriation Act 1879 (repealed)	42 & 43 Vict. c. 51	15 August 1879
An Act to apply a sum out of the Consolidated Fund to the service of the year ending the thirty-first day of March one thousand eight hundred and eighty, and to appropriate the Supplies granted in this Session of Parliament. (Repealed by Statute Law Revision Act 1894 (57 & 58 Vict. c. 56))
Land Tax Commissioners (Names) Act 1879 (repealed)	42 & 43 Vict. c. 52	15 August 1879
An Act to appoint additional Commissioners for executing the Acts for granting a Land Tax and other rates and taxes. (Repealed by Statute Law Revision Act 1950 (14 Geo. 6. c. 6))
Municipal Elections (Ireland) Act 1879 (repealed)	42 & 43 Vict. c. 53	15 August 1879
An Act to amend the Law regulating Municipal Elections in Ireland. (Repealed by Local Government (Ireland) Act 1898 (61 & 62 Vict. c. 37))
Poor Law Act 1879 (repealed)	42 & 43 Vict. c. 54	15 August 1879
An Act to make better provision for the adjustment of Parish Boundaries, and to make further amendments in the Acts relating to the relief of the Poor in England. (Repealed by Local Government Act 1966 (c. 42))
Prevention of Crime Act 1879 (repealed)	42 & 43 Vict. c. 55	15 August 1879
An Act to reduce the Minimum Term of Penal Servitude in the case of a previous conviction, and to amend the Law with respect to the notifications and reports made under sections five and eight of the Prevention of Crimes Act, 1871. (Note: Prevention of Crimes Act 1871 (34 & 35 Vict. c. 112)) (Repealed for England and Wales by Criminal Justice Act 1948 (11 & 12 Geo. 6. c. 58), for Scotland by Criminal Justice (Scotland) Act 1949 (12, 13 & 14 Geo. 6. c. 94) and for Northern Ireland by Statute Law Revision Act 1894 (57 & 58 Vict. c. 56) and Prison Act (Northern Ireland) 1953 (c. 18 (N.I.)))
Regulation of Railways Acts 1873 and 1874 Continuance Act 1879 (repealed)	42 & 43 Vict. c. 56	15 August 1879
An Act to continue for a further period the Regulation of Railways Acts, 1873 and 1874. (Repealed by Statute Law Revision Act 1894 (57 & 58 Vict. c. 56))
Public Health (Ireland) Amendment Act 1879	42 & 43 Vict. c. 57	15 August 1879
An Act to amend the Public Health (Ireland) Act, 1878. (Note: Public Health (Ireland) Act 1878 (41 & 42 Vict. c. 52))
Public Offices Fees Act 1879	42 & 43 Vict. c. 58	15 August 1879
An Act to provide for the Collection, either in money or by stamps, of Fees payable in Public Offices.
Civil Procedure Acts Repeal Act 1879 (repealed)	42 & 43 Vict. c. 59	15 August 1879
An Act for repealing certain Enactments relating to Civil Procedure which have ceased to be in force, or have become unnecessary, and for abolishing Outlawry in Civil Proceedings. (Repealed by Statute Law Revision Act 1958 (6 & 7 Eliz. 2. c. 46))
East India Loan Act 1879 (repealed)	42 & 43 Vict. c. 60	15 August 1879
An Act to enable the Secretary of State in Council of India to raise Money in the United Kingdom for the Service of the Government of India. (Repealed by East India Loans Act 1937 (1 Edw. 8 & 1 Geo. 6. c. 14))
East Indian Loan (Annuities) Act 1879 (repealed)	42 & 43 Vict. c. 61	15 August 1879
An Act to make provision for raising the Sum required for the purposes of the Advance authorised by the Indian Advance Act, 1879. (Repealed by Indian Loan Act 1881 (44 & 45 Vict. c. 54))
Exchequer Bills and Bonds Act 1879 (repealed)	42 & 43 Vict. c. 62	15 August 1879
An Act to raise the sum of four million two hundred thousand pounds by Exchequer Bonds, Exchequer Bills, or Treasury Bills, for the service of the year ending on the thirty-first day of March one thousand eight hundred and eighty. (Repealed by Statute Law Revision Act 1894 (57 & 58 Vict. c. 56))
Artizans and Labourers Dwellings Improvement Act 1879 (repealed)	42 & 43 Vict. c. 63	15 August 1879
An Act to amend the Artizans and Labourers Dwellings Improvement Act, 1875. (Repealed by Housing of the Working Classes Act 1890 (53 & 54 Vict. c. 70))
Artizans and Labourers Dwellings Act (1868) Amendment Act 1879 (repealed)	42 & 43 Vict. c. 64	15 August 1879
An Act to extend the powers of the Artizans Dwellings Act of 1868, by provisions for compensation and rebuilding. (Repealed by Housing of the Working Classes Act 1890 (53 & 54 Vict. c. 70))
University Education (Ireland) Act 1879 (repealed)	42 & 43 Vict. c. 65	15 August 1879
An Act to promote the advancement of Learning, and to extend the benefits connected with University Education in Ireland. (Repealed by Irish Universities Act 1908 (8 Edw. 7. c. 38))
Endowed School Acts Continuance Act 1879 (repealed)	42 & 43 Vict. c. 66	15 August 1879
An Act to continue for a further period the power of making Schemes under the Endowed Schools Acts, 1869, 1874, and 1876. (Repealed by Statute Law Revision Act 1894 (57 & 58 Vict. c. 56))
Expiring Laws Continuance Act 1879 (repealed)	42 & 43 Vict. c. 67	15 August 1879
An Act to continue various expiring Laws. (Repealed by Statute Law Revision Act 1894 (57 & 58 Vict. c. 56))
Metropolitan Board of Works Indemnity Act 1879 (repealed)	42 & 43 Vict. c. 68	15 August 1879
An Act to authorise the Metropolitan Board of Works to defray expenses incurred in relation to the promotion of certain Bills in Parliament relating to the supply of water to the Metropolis. (Repealed by Statute Law Revision Act 1894 (57 & 58 Vict. c. 56))
Metropolitan Board of Works (Money) Act 1879 (repealed)	42 & 43 Vict. c. 69	15 August 1879
An Act for further amending the Acts relating to the raising of Money by the Metropolitan Board of Works; and for other purposes relating thereto. (Repealed by London County Council (Finance Consolidation) Act 1912 (2 & 3 Geo. 5. c. cv))
Vaccination Amendment (Ireland) Act 1879 (repealed)	42 & 43 Vict. c. 70	15 August 1879
An Act to amend the Acts relating to Vaccination in Ireland. (Repealed by Vaccination (Repeals) Act (Northern Ireland) 1963 (c. 30 (N.I.)))
Registry Courts (Ireland) Amendment Act 1879 (repealed)	42 & 43 Vict. c. 71	15 August 1879
An Act to regulate the Practice in Registry Courts in Ireland. (Repealed by Statute Law Revision Act 1894 (57 & 58 Vict. c. 56) and Representation of the People Act 1918 (7 & 8 Geo. 5. c. 64))
Shipping Casualties Investigations Act 1879 (repealed)	42 & 43 Vict. c. 72	15 August 1879
An Act to provide for the re-hearing of Investigations into Shipping Casualties, and to amend the rules as to the mode of holding, and procedure at, such Investigations. (Repealed by Merchant Shipping Act 1894 (57 & 58 Vict. c. 60))
Commissioners of Woods (Thames Piers) Act 1879 (repealed)	42 & 43 Vict. c. 73	15 August 1879
An Act to authorise the Commissioners of Her Majesty's Woods and Forests and Land Revenues to agree with the Conservators of the River Thames on the Payments for Piers or Landing-places in or upon the Bed or Shore of the River Thames. (Repealed by Crown Estate Act 1961 (9 & 10 Eliz. 2. c. 55))
National School Teachers (Ireland) Act 1879 (repealed)	42 & 43 Vict. c. 74	15 August 1879
An Act for improving the position of the Teachers of National Schools in Ireland. (Repealed by Statute Law Revision Act 1894 (57 & 58 Vict. c. 56), Teachers' Superannuation Act (Northern Ireland) 1926 (16 & 17 Geo. 5. c. 16 (N.I.)) and Teachers' Superannuation Regulations (Northern Ireland) 1972 (SR&O (N.I.) 1972/319))
Parliamentary Elections and Corrupt Practices Act 1879 (repealed)	42 & 43 Vict. c. 75	15 August 1879
An Act to amend and continue the Acts relating to Election Petitions, and to the prevention of Corrupt Practices at Parliamentary Elections. (Repealed for England and Wales by Senior Courts Act 1981 (c. 54), for Scotland by Court of Session Act 1988 (c. 36) and for Northern Ireland by Judicature (Northern Ireland) Act 1978 (c. 23))
Companies Act 1879 (repealed)	42 & 43 Vict. c. 76	15 August 1879
An Act to amend the Law with respect to the Liability of Members of Banking and other Joint Stock Companies; and for other purposes. (Repealed by Companies (Consolidation) Act 1908 (8 Edw. 7. c. 69))
Public Works Loans Act 1879 (repealed)	42 & 43 Vict. c. 77	15 August 1879
An Act to amend the Acts relating to the Public Works Loan Commissioners and the Commissioners of Public Works in Ireland, and to grant money for the purpose of Loans by the said Commissioners; and for other purposes in relation thereto. (Repealed for England and Wales and Scotland by Public Works Loans Act 1964 (c. 9) and for Northern Ireland by Public Works &c Loans Act (Northern Ireland) 1953 (c. 13 (N.I.)))
Supreme Court of Judicature (Officers) Act 1879 (repealed)	42 & 43 Vict. c. 78	15 August 1879
An Act to amend the Supreme Court of Judicature Acts. (Repealed by Supreme Court of Judicature (Consolidation) Act 1925 (15 & 16 Geo. 5. c. 49))

=== Local acts ===
Short title	Citation	Royal assent
Long title
Oyster and Mussel Fisheries Order Confirmation Act 1879	42 & 43 Vict. c. i	23 May 1879
An Act to confirm an Order made by the Board of Trade under the Sea Fisheries Act, 1868, (Note: Sea Fisheries Act 1868 (31 & 32 Vict. c. 45)) relating to Tollesbury and Mersea, in the River Blackwater (Essex).
	Tollesbury and Mersea (Blackwater) Fishery Order 1879	
Drainage and Improvement of Lands Supplemental Act (Ireland) 1879	42 & 43 Vict. c. ii	23 May 1879
An Act to confirm a Provisional Order under the Drainage and Improvement of Lands (Ireland) Act, 1863, and the Acts amending the same.
	Barnakyle Drainage Order 1879	
General Police and Improvement (Scotland) Act 1862 Order Confirmation (Paisley) Act 1879	42 & 43 Vict. c. iii	23 May 1879
An Act to confirm a Provisional Order under the General Police and Improvement (Scotland) Act, 1862, (Note: General Police and Improvement (Scotland) Act 1862 (25 & 26 Vict. c. 101)) relating to the Burgh of Paisley.
	Paisley Order 1879	
General Police and Improvement (Scotland) Act 1862 Order Confirmation (Inverness) Act 1879	42 & 43 Vict. c. iv	23 May 1879
An Act to confirm a Provisional Order under the General Police and Improvement (Scotland) Act, 1862, relating to the Burgh of Inverness.
	Inverness Order 1879	
Dover and Deal Railway Act 1879	42 & 43 Vict. c. v	23 May 1879
An Act to extend the periods limited for the compulsory purchase of lands for, and for the completion of, the Dover and Deal Railway.
Grand Junction Waterworks Act 1879	42 & 43 Vict. c. vi	23 May 1879
An Act to amend the Grand Junction Waterworks Act, 1878. (Note: Grand Junction Waterworks Act 1878 (41 & 42 Vict. c. cxxxiv))
North and South Woolwich Subway Act 1879	42 & 43 Vict. c. vii	23 May 1879
An Act to extend the time for the completion of the North and South Woolwich Subway.
Ecclesiastical Commissioners (Croydon) Act 1879	42 & 43 Vict. c. viii	23 May 1879
An Act to remove certain impediments in the way of building on certain land in Croydon allotted in the year 1801 under the powers of an Inclosure Act of the Thirty-seventh year of the reign of King George the Third, Cap.
Bury Saint Edmund's Gas Act 1879	42 & 43 Vict. c. ix	23 May 1879
An Act conferring additional powers on the Bury Saint Edmund's Gas Company.
New River Company's Act 1879	42 & 43 Vict. c. x	23 May 1879
An Act to authorise the New River Company to raise further Money.
Nottingham Waterworks Act 1879	42 & 43 Vict. c. xi	23 May 1879
An Act for granting further powers to the Nottingham Waterworks Company.
Weymouth and Melcombe Regis Bridge Act 1879	42 & 43 Vict. c. xii	23 May 1879
An Act for conferring upon the Corporation of Weymouth and Melcombe Regis further Powers in relation to the Bridge over the Harbour; and for other purposes.
Burnt Fen District Act 1879	42 & 43 Vict. c. xiii	23 May 1879
An Act to amend the Acts relating to the Burnt Fen First District, and to provide for the making and maintaining of Roads in the said District; and for other purposes.
Chester Cemetery (Extension) Act 1879	42 & 43 Vict. c. xiv	23 May 1879
An Act to empower the Chester Cemetery Company to enlarge their Cemetery, and to confer further Powers upon them in relation to their undertaking; and for other purposes.
Brewood and Wolverhampton Railway (Abandonment) Act 1879 (repealed)	42 & 43 Vict. c. xv	23 May 1879
An Act for the Abandonment of the Railway authorised by the Brewood and Wolverhampton Railway Acts, 1874 and 1875. (Repealed by Statute Law (Repeals) Act 2013 (c. 2))
Forth Bridge Railway Act 1879	42 & 43 Vict. c. xvi	23 May 1879
An Act to extend the Time for the Purchase of Lands for and for the Construction of the Forth Bridge Railway.
Westgate and Birchington Water Act 1879 (repealed)	42 & 43 Vict. c. xvii	23 May 1879
An Act for incorporating the Westgate and Birchington, Water Company; and for other purposes. (Repealed by Kent Water Act 1955 (4 & 5 Eliz. 2. c. xi))
Llandudno Improvement Act 1879	42 & 43 Vict. c. xviii	23 May 1879
An Act to amend the Llandudno Improvement Act, 1876, (Note: Llandudno Improvement Act 1876 (39 & 40 Vict. c. ccxli)) to authorise the Abandonment of certain Waterworks, and the Construction of other Waterworks instead thereof, by the Commissioners acting in execution of the said Act; and for other purposes.
Whitby Port and Harbour Act 1879	42 & 43 Vict. c. xix	23 May 1879
An Act to alter the constitution of the Trustees of the Port and Harbour of Whitby in the north riding of the county of York; for better defining the limits of the said Port and Harbour; and for other purposes.
Norwich Union Fire Insurance Society's Act 1879 (repealed)	42 & 43 Vict. c. xx	23 May 1879
An Act to explain and amend the Deed of Settlement of the Norwich Union Fire Insurance Society, to provide for the increase of the capital and subdivision of the shares of that Society, and to enable that Society to sue and be sued in the name of a public officer. (Repealed by Norwich Union Fire Insurance Society Limited Act 1908 (8 Edw. 7. c. xi))
Borough of Portsmouth Waterworks Act 1879	42 & 43 Vict. c. xxi	23 May 1879
An Act for conferring further powers upon the Borough of Portsmouth Waterworks Company.
Saint Bartholomew's Hospital and Brasenose College Act 1879	42 & 43 Vict. c. xxii	23 May 1879
An Act to authorise a Sale by the Principal and Scholars of Brasenose College in the University of Oxford to the Governors of Saint Bartholomew's Hospital of two Houses situate in Little Britain in the city of London within the gates of the said hospital.
Leeds Corporation Act 1879 (repealed)	42 & 43 Vict. c. xxiii	23 May 1879
An Act to confer further Powers on the Corporation of Leeds with reference to Hunslet Moor; and for other purposes. (Repealed by West Yorkshire Act 1980 (c. xiv))
South Dublin Railway (Abandonment) Act 1879	42 & 43 Vict. c. xxiv	23 May 1879
An Act for the Abandonment of the South Dublin Railway.
Sidmouth Railway Act 1879	42 & 43 Vict. c. xxv	23 May 1879
An Act for the Abandonment of the Railways authorised by the Sidmouth Railway Act, 1876; (Note: Sidmouth Railway Act 1876 (39 & 40 Vict. c. ccx)) and for other purposes.
Pemberton Local Board Water Act 1879	42 & 43 Vict. c. xxvi	23 May 1879
An Act for conferring further Powers on the Pemberton Local Board in relation to the Construction of Waterworks and the Supply of Water; and for other purposes.
Gosport Street Tramways Act 1879	42 & 43 Vict. c. xxvii	23 May 1879
An Act for incorporating the Gosport Street Tramways Company, and for empowering them to construct Tramways; and for other purposes.
Lewes Cattle Market Act 1879	42 & 43 Vict. c. xxviii	23 May 1879
An Act for establishing a Cattle Market at Lewes in Sussex.
Rathkeale and Newcastle Junction Railway Act 1879	42 & 43 Vict. c. xxix	23 May 1879
An Act to confer further powers on the Rathkeale and Newcastle Junction Railway Company.
South Western and the Brighton Railway Companies (Steam Vessels) Act 1879	42 & 43 Vict. c. xxx	23 May 1879
An Act for authorising the London and South-western Railway Company and the London, Brighton, and South Coast Railway Company to provide and use Steam and other Vessels for conveyance of traffic between places on the coast of Hampshire, and between those places and the Isle of Wight; and for other purposes.
London, Brighton, and South Coast Railway (Various Powers) Act 1879	42 & 43 Vict. c. xxxi	23 May 1879
An Act to confer further powers on the London, Brighton, and South Coast Railway Company.
Severn Bridge and Forest of Dean Central Railway Act 1879 (repealed)	42 & 43 Vict. c. xxxii	23 May 1879
An Act to authorise an extension of time to the Severn Bridge and Forest of Dean Central Railway Company for completing their Undertaking. (Repealed by Statute Law (Repeals) Act 2013 (c. 2))
Sleaford Water Act 1879 (repealed)	42 & 43 Vict. c. xxxiii	23 May 1879
An Act for better supplying with Water the town of Sleaford in the county of Lincoln and the adjacent district; and for other purposes. (Repealed by Sleaford Water Order 1949 (SI 1949/1331))
Vicars and Smith's Patent Act 1879	42 & 43 Vict. c. xxxiv	23 May 1879
An Act for rendering valid certain Letters Patent granted to Thomas Vicars the elder and Thomas Vicars the younger, of Liverpool in the County of Lancaster, and James Smith, of the same place, for the Invention of Improvements in Self-stoking Furnaces.
Tipton Local Board Act 1879	42 & 43 Vict. c. xxxv	23 May 1879
An Act to enable the Local Board for the District of Tipton in the County of Stafford to acquire certain Lands for the purposes of their Gas Undertaking; and for other purposes.
Manchester Corporation Waterworks Act 1879	42 & 43 Vict. c. xxxvi	23 May 1879
An Act for enabling the Mayor, Aldermen, and Citizens of 187% the city of Manchester, in the county of Lancaster, to obtain a supply of Water from the Lake Thirlmere in Cumberland; and for other purposes.
Birmingham (Corporation) Water Act 1879 (repealed)	42 & 43 Vict. c. xxxvii	23 May 1879
An Act to extend the time limited by the Birmingham Waterworks Act, 1870, (Note: Birmingham Waterworks Act 1870 (33 & 34 Vict. c. cxxviii)) for the Construction of the Works by that Act authorised, and to empower the Corporation of the Borough of Birmingham to borrow further Moneys for the purposes of the Birmingham (Corporation) Water Act, 1875, (Note: Birmingham (Corporation) Water Act 1875 (38 & 39 Vict. c. clxxxviii)) and of the Waterworks of the Corporation; and for other purposes. (Repealed by Birmingham Corporation (Consolidation) Act 1883 (46 & 47 Vict. c. lxx))
Brighton and Hove Gas Act 1879	42 & 43 Vict. c. xxxviii	23 May 1879
An Act to authorise the Brighton and Hove General Gas Company to construct additional works, to acquire lands, to raise additional capital; and for other purposes.
Saint Pancras Loans Act 1879	42 & 43 Vict. c. xxxix	23 May 1879
An Act to provide for the Repayment of Loans raised under and for the purposes of certain Local Acts relating to the Parish of Saint Pancras in the County of Middlesex.
Glasgow Corporation Waterworks Amendment Act 1879 (repealed)	42 & 43 Vict. c. xl	23 May 1879
An Act to authorise the Commissioners of the Glasgow Corporation Waterworks to construct additional Works; and for other purposes. (Repealed by Glasgow Corporation Consolidation (Water, Transport and Markets) Order Confirmation Act 1964 (c. xliii))
Land Drainage Supplemental Act 1879 (repealed)	42 & 43 Vict. c. xli	23 May 1879
An Act to confirm a Provisional Order under the Land Drainage Act, 1861, (Note: Land Drainage Act 1861 (24 & 25 Vict. c. 133)) relating to Bispham, Carleton, and Thornton Improvements, situated in the parishes of Bispham and Poulton, in the county of Lancaster. (Repealed by County of Lancashire Act 1984 (c. xxi))
Public Health (Scotland) Act 1867 Order Confirmation (Castle Douglas) Act 1879	42 & 43 Vict. c. xlii	23 May 1879
An Act to confirm a Provisional Order under the Public Health (Scotland) Act, 1867, relating to the Burgh of Castle Douglas.
	Castle Douglas Order 1879	
Local Government Board's Provisional Orders Confirmation (Ashton-under-Lyne, &c.) Act 1879	42 & 43 Vict. c. xliii	23 May 1879
An Act to confirm certain Provisional Orders of the Local Government Board relating to the Borough of Ashtonunder-Lyne, the Local Government District of Blackrod, the Rural Sanitary District of the Burton-on-Trent Union, the Local Government District of Chelmsford, the Borough of Cheltenham, the Local Government District of Ealing, the Boroughs of Jarrow, Maidstone, Newport (Monmouthshire), and Penzance, the Local Government District of Prestwich, the Rural Sanitary Districts of the Rugby Union and Southam Union, the Local Government Districts of Swinton and Pendlebury and Torquay, and the Improvement Act District of West Hartlepool.
	Ashton-under-Lyne Order 1879	
	Blackrod Order 1879	
	Burton-upon-Trent Union Order 1879	
	Chelmsford Order 1879	
	Cheltenham Order 1879	
	Ealing Order 1879	
	Jarrow Order 1879	
	Maidstone Order 1879	
	Newport (Mon.) Order 1879	
	Penzance Order 1879	
	Prestwich Order 1879	
	Rugby Union Order 1879	
	Southam Union Order 1879	
	Swinton and Pendlebury Order 1879	
	Torquay Order 1879	
	West Hartlepool Order 1879	
Cranbrook and Paddock Wood Railway Act 1879	42 & 43 Vict. c. xliv	27 May 1879
An Act to authorise the Cranbrook and Paddock Wood Railway Company to divert portions of their authorised Line; and for other purposes.
London, Chatham, and Dover Railway Act 1879	42 & 43 Vict. c. xlv	27 May 1879
An Act for conferring further powers on the London, Chatham, and Dover Railway Company; and for other purposes.
Greenock Railway Guaranteed Company's Act 1879	42 & 43 Vict. c. xlvi	27 May 1879
An Act to make provision with respect to Capital fraudulently created in the Greenock Railway Guaranteed Company.
Lancashire County Justices Act 1879 (repealed)	42 & 43 Vict. c. xlvii	27 May 1879
An Act for enabling the Justices of the Peace for the County Palatine of Lancaster to erect offices for the transaction of County Business, and to make a new road; and for other purposes. (Repealed by County of Lancashire Act 1984 (c. xxi))
North British Railway (General Powers) Act 1879	42 & 43 Vict. c. xlviii	3 July 1879
An Act to authorise the North British Railway Company to make a railway and pier and stop up a road in the parish of Cardross in the county of Dumbarton; to confirm certain agreements with respect to the railway at Dundee, and the carrying of a water pipe across the Tay Bridge; and for other purposes.
East London Railway Act 1879	42 & 43 Vict. c. xlix	3 July 1879
An Act for empowering the East London Railway Company to acquire additional Lands; for conferring further Rights and Powers upon the Holders of the Debenture Stocks and Preference Stocks of the Company; and for other purposes.
Bromley Gas Act 1879 (repealed)	42 & 43 Vict. c. l	3 July 1879
An Act to authorise the Bromley Gas Consumers Company to raise additional Capital; and for other purposes. (Repealed by South Suburban Gas Act 1928 (18 & 19 Geo. 5. c. lxxx))
Rawmarsh Local Board Act 1879	42 & 43 Vict. c. li	3 July 1879
An Act to vest in the Rawmarsh Local Board the gas mains and pipes within their district now belonging to the Corporation of Rotherham; to enable the Local Board to supply Gas within their district, and also to supply Gas and Water within certain parts of the adjoining township of Greasbrough; and for other purposes.
East Cornwall Mineral Railway Act 1879	42 & 43 Vict. c. lii	3 July 1879
An Act for the Abandonment of the Works authorised by the East Cornwall Mineral Railway Act, 1876; (Note: East Cornwall Mineral Railway Act 1876 (39 & 40 Vict. c. ccxl)) and for other purposes.
Merionethshire Railway (Extension of Time) Act 1879 (repealed)	42 & 43 Vict. c. liii	3 July 1879
An Act to further extend the time for the completion of the Merionethshire Railway. (Repealed by Merionethshire Railway (Abandonment) Act 1887 (50 & 51 Vict. c. cviii))
Local Government Board (Ireland) Provisional Orders Confirmation (Clonmel, &c.) Act 1879	42 & 43 Vict. c. liv	3 July 1879
An Act to confirm certain Provisional Orders of the Local Government Board for Ireland relating to the towns of Clonmel and Dundalk, and to a Burial Ground for the town of Clonmel, and to Waterworks in the town of Keady.
	Borough of Clonmel Provisional Order 1879	
	Town of Dundalk Provisional Order 1879	
	Clonmel Burial Ground Provisional Order 1879	
	Keady Waterworks Provisional Order 1879	
Pier and Harbour Orders Confirmation Act 1879	42 & 43 Vict. c. lv	3 July 1879
An Act to confirm certain Provisional Orders made by the Board of Trade under the General Pier and Harbour Act, 1861, (Note: General Pier and Harbour Act 1861 (24 & 25 Vict. c. 45)) relating to Ramsgate, St. Anne's-on-the-Sea, Skegness, Strachur (Loch Fyne), Totland Bay, Westgate, Whitehall (Stronsay), Cromarty, Fortrose, Lybster, Penzance, and Torquay.
	Ramsgate Promenade Pier Order 1879	
	St. Anne's-on-the-Sea Pier Order 1879	
	Skegness Pier Order 1879	
	Strachur (Loch Fyne) Pier Order 1879	
	Totland Bay Pier Order 1879	
	Westgate Pier Order 1879	
	Whitehall (Stronsay) Pier and Harbour Order 1879	
	Cromarty Harbour Order 1879	
	Fortrose Pier and Harbour Order 1879	
	Lybster Harbour Order 1879	
	Penzance Harbour Order 1879	
	Torquay Promenade Pier Order 1879	
Local Government Board (Ireland) Provisional Order (Downpatrick) Confirmation Act 1879	42 & 43 Vict. c. lvi	3 July 1879
An Act for confirming a certain Provisional Order of the Local Government Board for Ireland relating to Waterworks in the Poor Law Union of Downpatrick.
	Downpatrick Waterworks Provisional Order 1879	
Local Government Board (Ireland) Provisional Orders Confirmation (Cashel, &c.) Act 1879	42 & 43 Vict. c. lvii	3 July 1879
An Act for confirming certain Provisional Orders of the Local Government Board for Ireland relating to the towns of Cashel, Enniscorthy, Holywood, Kells, Templemore, Wicklow, and Youghal.
	Cashel Sanitary District Provisional Order 1879	
	Town of Enniscorthy Provisional Order 1879	
	Holywood Sanitary District Provisional Order 1879	
	Town of Kells Provisional Order 1879	
	Town of Templemore Provisional Order 1879	
	Town of Wicklow Provisional Order 1879	
	Town of Youghal Provisional Order 1879	
Education Department Provisional Orders Confirmation (Brighton and Preston, &c.) Act 1879	42 & 43 Vict. c. lviii	3 July 1879
An Act to confirm certain Provisional Orders made by the Education Department under the Elementary Education Act, 1870, (Note: Elementary Education Act 1870 (33 & 34 Vict. c. 75)) to enable the School Boards for Brighton and Preston United District (Sussex), Gotherington (Gloucester), Loughor Borough (Glamorgan), and Membury (Devon) to put in force the Lands Clauses Consolidation Act, 1845, (Note: Lands Clauses Consolidation Act 1845 (8 & 9 Vict. c. 18)) and the Acts amending the same.
	Brighton and Preston Order 1879	
	Gotherington Order 1879	
	Loughor Order 1879	
	Membury Order 1879	
Education Department Provisional Order Confirmation (London) Act 1879	42 & 43 Vict. c. lix	3 July 1879
An Act to confirm a Provisional Order made by the Education Department under the Elementary Education Act, 1870, to enable the School Board for London to put in force the Lands Clauses Consolidation Act, 1845, and the Acts amending the same.
	London Order 1879	
Local Government Board (Ireland) Provisional Orders Confirmation (Waterford, &c.) Act 1879	42 & 43 Vict. c. lx	3 July 1879
An Act to confirm certain Provisional Orders of the Local Government Board for Ireland relating to the borough of Waterford and to the town of Bangor.
	Waterford Waterworks Provisional Order 1879	
	Bangor Provisional Order 1879	
Public Health (Scotland) Act 1867 Order Confirmation (Bothwell) Act 1879	42 & 43 Vict. c. lxi	3 July 1879
An Act to confirm a Provisional Order made under the Public Health (Scotland) Act, 1867, relating to the Parish of Bothwell, in the County of Lanark.
	Bothwell Order 1879	
Bath Act 1879 (repealed)	42 & 43 Vict. c. lxii	3 July 1879
An Act for vesting in the Mayor, Aldermen, and Burgesses of the city and borough of Bath the Bath Commons or Free men's Estate, and to provide compensation to the Free Citizens of the same city and borough for their interests therein, and for empowering the said Mayor, Aldermen, and Burgesses to acquire by agreement and to demise and manage Lands for a Public Park; and for other purposes. (Repealed by County of Avon Act 1982 (c. iv))
City of London School Act 1879	42 & 43 Vict. c. lxiii	3 July 1879
An Act for enabling the Corporation of the City of London to appropriate certain Lands facing the Victoria Embankment in the said City for the purpose of providing School Buildings and Accommodation for the City of London School; for the removal of the said School to such Buildings; for the sale of the Lands and Buildings now occupied by the said School; and for other purposes.
Glossop Gas Act 1879	42 & 43 Vict. c. lxiv	3 July 1879
An Act to extend the District of the Glossop Gas Company; to enable the Company to raise additional Capital; and for other purposes.
Wellington Street United Presbyterian Church (Glasgow) Act 1879	42 & 43 Vict. c. lxv	3 July 1879
An Act to provide for the removal of the remains of persons, interred underneath Wellington Street United Presbyterian Church, in the City of Glasgow; and for other purposes.
Dun Drainage Act Amendment Act 1879	42 & 43 Vict. c. lxvi	3 July 1879
An Act to extend the time granted to the Dun Drainage Commissioners for the completion of certain Works; to authorise new Works; to confer further Borrowing Powers; and for other purposes.
Millwall Dock Act 1879 (repealed)	42 & 43 Vict. c. lxvii	3 July 1879
An Act for conferring further powers on the Millwall Dock Company, and to authorise certain agreements between them and other Dock Companies; and for other purposes. (Repealed by Port of London (Consolidation) Act 1920 (10 & 11 Geo. 5. c. clxxiii))
West Kent Main Sewerage (Amendment) Act 1879	42 & 43 Vict. c. lxviii	3 July 1879
An Act for conferring further powers on the West Kent Main Sewerage Board and its Constituent Authorities, and for making Amendments in the West Kent Main Sewerage Acts; and for other purposes.
East Norfolk Railway Act 1879	42 & 43 Vict. c. lxix	3 July 1879
An Act to authorise the East Norfolk Railway Company to make certain deviations in the Line of their Aylsham Extension Railway, to extend that Railway to the Dereham, Fakenham, and Wells Railway of the Great Eastern Railway Company; and for other purposes.
Imperial Continental Gas Association Act 1879 (repealed)	42 & 43 Vict. c. lxx	3 July 1879
An Act for empowering the Imperial Continental Gas Association to supply means of Lighting other than Gas, and for other purposes. (Repealed by Imperial Continental Gas Association Act 1929 (19 & 20 Geo. 5. c. lxxxix))
Thames and Severn Canal Act 1879	42 & 43 Vict. c. lxxi	3 July 1879
An Act to authorise the Company of Proprietors of the Thames and Severn Canal Navigation to raise more Money; and for other purposes.
Southwark and Deptford Tramways Act 1879	42 & 43 Vict. c. lxxii	3 July 1879
An Act to authorise the construction of Tramways in Southwark, Deptford, and other places in the counties of Surrey and Kent; and for other purposes.
Grantham Extension Act 1879	42 & 43 Vict. c. lxxiii	3 July 1879
An Act for extending the Boundaries of the Municipal Borough of Grantham; and for other purposes.
Ilkley Gas Act 1879	42 & 43 Vict. c. lxxiv	3 July 1879
An Act to authorise the Ilkley Gas Company to raise a further Sum of Money; and for other purposes.
Yarmouth and North Norfolk (Light) Railway Act 1879	42 & 43 Vict. c. lxxv	3 July 1879
An Act to confer further powers upon the Yarmouth and North Norfolk (Light) Railway Company.
Colwyn Bay Waterworks Act 1879	42 & 43 Vict. c. lxxvi	3 July 1879
An Act to incorporate the Colwyn Bay Waterworks Company, and to confer upon them powers to supply Water.
Local Government Board's (Highways) Provisional Orders Confirmation (Buckingham, &c.) Act 1879	42 & 43 Vict. c. lxxvii	3 July 1879
An Act to confirm certain Provisional Orders of the Local Government Board under the provisions of the Highways and Locomotives (Amendment) Act, 1878, (Note: Highways and Locomotives (Amendment) Act 1878 (41 & 42 Vict. c. 77)) relating to the Counties of Buckingham, Kent, and Worcester.
	Buckingham Order 1879	
	Kent Order 1879	
	Worcester Order 1879	
Local Government Board's Provisional Orders Confirmation (Aysgarth Union, &c.) Act 1879	42 & 43 Vict. c. lxxviii	3 July 1879
An Act to confirm certain Provisional Orders of the Local Government Board relating to the Rural Sanitary District of the Aysgarth Union, the Improvement Act District of Bethesda, the Borough of Brecknock, the Local Government District of Croydon, the Boroughs of Derby, Doncaster, and Hastings, the Local Government Districts of Hinckley, Horsham, and Houghton-le-Spring, the Borough of Middlesbrough, the Local Government Districts of Northallerton and Tunstall, the Port of Wisbech, the Local Government District of Withington, and the Borough of Yeovil.
	Aysgarth Union Order 1879	
	Bethesda Order 1879	
	Brecknock Order 1879	
	Croydon Order 1879	
	Derby Order 1879	
	Doncaster Order 1879	
	Hastings Order 1879	
	Hinckley Order 1879	
	Horsham Order 1879	
	Houghton-le-Spring Order 1879	
	Middlesbrough Order 1879	
	Northallerton Order 1879	
	Tunstall Order 1879	
	Wisbech Order 1879	
	Withington Order 1879	
	Yeovil Order 1879	
Metropolis (Little Coram Street, Bloomsbury, Wells Street, Poplar, and Great Peter Street, Westminster) Improvement Provisional Orders Confirmation Act 1879	42 & 43 Vict. c. lxxix	3 July 1879
An Act to confirm certain Provisional Orders of one of Her Majesty's Principal Secretaries of State for the improvement of certain unhealthy areas within the Metropolis.
	Little Coram Street, St. Giles District and St. Pancras Improvement Order 1879	
	Wells Street, Poplar, Improvement Order 1879	
	Great Peter Street, Westminster Improvement Order 1879	
Metropolis (Whitechapel and Limehouse) Improvement Scheme Modification Act 1879	42 & 43 Vict. c. lxxx	3 July 1879
An Act to confirm a Provisional Order of one of Her Majesty's Principal Secretaries of State for the modification of a Scheme confirmed by the Metropolis (Whitechapel and Limehouse) Improvement Scheme Confirmation Act, 1876. (Note: Metropolis (Whitechapel and Limehouse) Improvement Scheme Confirmation Act 1876 (39 & 40 Vict. c. cc))
	Whitechapel and Limehouse Improvement Order 1879	
Inclosure and Regulation (Matterdale) Provisional Orders Confirmation Act 1879	42 & 43 Vict. c. lxxxi	3 July 1879
An Act to confirm the Provisional Order for the regulation of certain Lands forming part of Matterdale Common, and situated in the parish of Greystoke, in the county of Cumberland, and the Provisional Order for the inclosure of certain other Lands forming the remainder of the same common, and situated in the same parish, in pursuance of a Report of the Inclosure Commissioners for England and Wales.
	Matterdale Common Regulation Order 1879	
	Matterale Common Inclosure Order 1879	
Inclosure (Redmoor and Golberdon) Provisional Order Confirmation Act 1879	42 & 43 Vict. c. lxxxii	3 July 1879
An Act to confirm the Provisional Order for the Inclosure of certain Lands known as Redmoor and Golberdon Commons, situate in the parish of South Hill, in the county of Cornwall, in pursuance of a report of the Inclosure Commissioners for England and Wales.
	Redmoor and Golberton Common Order 1879	
Inclosure and Regulation (East Stainmore) Provisional Orders Confirmation Act 1879	42 & 43 Vict. c. lxxxiii	3 July 1879
An Act to confirm the Provisional Order for the regulation of certain Lands forming part of East Stainmore Common, and situated in the township of East Stainmore, in the parish of Brough, in the county of Westmorland, and the Provisional Order for the inclosure of certain other Lands forming the remainder of the same common, and situated in the same parish, in pursuance of a Report of the Inclosure Commissioners for England and Wales.
	East Stainmore Regulation Order 1879	
	East Stainmore Inclosure Order 1879	
Local Government Board's (Highways) Provisional Orders Confirmation (Gloucester and Hereford) Act 1879	42 & 43 Vict. c. lxxxiv	3 July 1879
An Act to confirm certain Provisional Orders of the Local Government Board under the provisions of the Highways and Locomotives (Amendment) Act, 1878, relating to the Counties of Gloucester and Hereford.
	Gloucester Order 1879	
	Hereford Order 1879	
Local Government Board's (Highways) Provisional Orders Confirmation (Dorset, &c.) Act 1879	42 & 43 Vict. c. lxxxv	3 July 1879
An Act to confirm certain Provisional Orders of the Local Government Board under the provisions of the Highways and Locomotives (Amendment) Act, 1878, relating to the counties of Dorset, Montgomery, Northampton, Salop, Wilts, and York (East Riding).
	Dorset Order 1879	
	Montgomery Order 1879	
	Northampton Order 1879	
	Salop Order 1879	
	Wilts Order 1879	
	York (East Riding) Order 1879	
Local Government Board's Provisional Orders Confirmation (Castleton-by-Rochdale, &c.) Act 1879	42 & 43 Vict. c. lxxxvi	3 July 1879
An Act to confirm certain Provisional Orders of the Local Government Board relating to the Local Government District of Castleton-by-Rochdale, the District of Hey wood, the Local Government Districts of Keighley and Littleborough, the Improvement Act District of Middleton and Tonge, the Local Government Districts of Milnrow and Royton, the Sittingbourne and Milton Joint Hospital District, and the Local Government Districts of Wallingfen and Wuerdle and Wardle.
	Castleton-by-Rochdale Order 1879	
	Heywood Order 1879	
	Keighley Order 1879	
	Littleborough Order 1879	
	Middleton and Tonge Order 1879	
	Milnrow Order 1879	
	Royton Order 1879	
	Sittingbourne and Milton Order 1879	
	Wallingfen Order 1879	
	Wuerdle and Wardle Order 1879	
Local Government Board (Ireland) Provisional Orders Confirmation (Killarney, &c.) Act 1879	42 & 43 Vict. c. lxxxvii	3 July 1879
An Act to confirm certain Provisional Orders of the Local Government Board for Ireland relating to the towns of Killarney and Parsonstown.
	Town of Killarney Provisional Order 1879	
	Town of Parsonstown Provisional Order 1879	
Aberdeen Harbour Act 1879	42 & 43 Vict. c. lxxxviii	3 July 1879
An Act to confer further powers on the Aberdeen Harbour Commissioners.
Nelson Local Board Act 1879	42 & 43 Vict. c. lxxxix	3 July 1879
An Act to enable the Local Board for the district of Nelson in the county of Lancaster to extend their Waterworks, and to confer upon them further powers with respect to the Improvement and Government of their district and the raising of Money; and for other purposes.
Goole Lighting Act 1879	42 & 43 Vict. c. xc	3 July 1879
An Act for conferring powers upon the Undertakers of the., Navigation of the Rivers of Aire and Calder, in the county of York, for the better supply of Gas to the Port and Town of Goole, and neighbourhood thereof; and for other purposes.
Swindon, Marlborough, and Andover Railway Act 1879	42 & 43 Vict. c. xci	3 July 1879
An Act for enabling the Swindon, Marlborough, and Andover Railway Company to construct new or deviation Lines of Railway; to abandon certain portions of their authorised Railway; and for other purposes.
Warrington Corporation Lighting and Improvement Act 1879	42 & 43 Vict. c. xcii	3 July 1879
An Act for authorising the Mayor, Aldermen, and Burgesses of the borough of Warrington, in the counties of Lancaster and Chester, to construct additional Gasworks; and for making better provision for the Improvement and Government of the borough; and for other purposes.
Christ Church (City) Tithe Act 1879 (repealed)	42 & 43 Vict. c. xciii	3 July 1879
An Act for the Settlement of Tithes in the Parish of Christ Church Newgate Street, in the City of London. (Repealed by City of London (Various Powers) Act 1950 (14 Geo. 6. c. v))
Great Southern and Western Railway (Additional Powers) Act 1879	42 & 43 Vict. c. xciv	3 July 1879
An Act for enabling the Great Southern and Western, Railway Company to acquire additional Lands for the purposes of their Undertaking; to widen, remove, and replace certain of their Bridges; and for vesting in that Company the Undertaking of the Castleisland Railway Company; and for other purposes.
Clare Slob Land Reclamation Extension Act 1879	42 & 43 Vict. c. xcv	3 July 1879
An Act for embanking and reclaiming certain Waste Land, on the Western Bank of the River Fergus, in the county of Clare.
Liverpool United Tramways and Omnibus Company's Act 1879 (repealed)	42 & 43 Vict. c. xcvi	3 July 1879
An Act for amalgamating the Liverpool Tramways Company and the Liverpool Omnibus and Tramways Company, Limited, and for re-incorporating them under the name of the Liverpool United Tramways and Omnibus Company; and for other purposes. (Repealed by Liverpool Corporation Act 1921 (11 & 12 Geo. 5. c. lxxiv))
Eastbourne Improvement Act 1879	42 & 43 Vict. c. xcvii	3 July 1879
An Act for empowering the Local Board for the district of Eastbourne to make and maintain a Seawall or Embankment, a Street Improvement, a Town Hall, and other Works, and to make further provisions for the improvement of the said district; and for other purposes.
St. Alban City Improvement Act 1879	42 & 43 Vict. c. xcviii	3 July 1879
An Act to extend the Limits of the City of St. Alban in the County of Hertford; and for other purposes.
Stourbridge Gas Amendment Act 1879	42 & 43 Vict. c. xcix	3 July 1879
An Act to enlarge the Powers of the Stourbridge Gas Company.
Dudley Sewage Act 1879	42 & 43 Vict. c. c	3 July 1879
An Act to confirm an Arrangement between the Earl of Dudley and the Corporation of Dudley with reference to the disposal of the Sewage of the Town of Dudley.
Maryport Improvement (Harbour) Act 1879 (repealed)	42 & 43 Vict. c. ci	3 July 1879
An Act to alter and amend the Maryport Improvement Acts, 1866 to 1878; to authorise new Works; to extend the powers of the Trustees; and for other purposes. (Repealed by Maryport Harbour Revision Order 2007 (SI 2007/3463))
Leadenhall Market Act 1879 (repealed)	42 & 43 Vict. c. cii	3 July 1879
An Act for the abolition of the present Leadenhall Market, for the improvement of the Site and Neighbourhood thereof, the formation of new Streets, the establishment of a new Leadenhall Market; and for other purposes. (Repealed by Statute Law (Repeals) Act 2008 (c. 12))
Local Government Board's Provisional Orders Confirmation (Abergavenny Union, &c.) Act 1879	42 & 43 Vict. c. ciii	3 July 1879
An Act to confirm certain Provisional Orders of the Local Government Board relating to the Rural Sanitary District of the Abergavenny Union, the Borough of Bolton, the Local Government District of Clay Lane, the Rural Sanitary District of the Clutton Union, the Darenth Valley Main Sewerage District, the Rural Sanitary District of the Great Ouseburn Union, the Borough of Halifax, the Local Government District of Huyton-with-Roby, the Port of Lowestoft, the Improvement Act District of Lowestoft, the Boroughs of Preston and Saint Helens, and the Local Government Districts of Stone and Widnes.
	Abergavenny Union Order 1879	
	Bolton Order 1879	
	Clay Lane Order 1879	
	Clutton Union Order 1879	
	Darenth Valley Order 1879	
	Great Ouseburn Union Order 1879	
	Halifax Order 1879	
	Huyton-with-Roby Order 1879	
	Port of Lowestoft Order 1879	
	District of Lowestoft Order 1879	
	Preston Order 1879	
	St. Helens Order 1879	
	Stone Order 1879	
	Widnes Order 1879	
Local Government Board's Provisional Orders Confirmation (Axminster Union, &c.) Act 1879	42 & 43 Vict. c. civ	3 July 1879
An Act to confirm certain Provisional Orders of the Local Government Board relating to the Rural Sanitary District of the Axminster Union, the Boroughs of Liverpool and Oswestry, the Local Government District of Pontypridd, the Improvement Act District of Ramsgate, and the Local Government Districts of Wellington (Somerset) and Ystradyfodwg.
	Axminster Union Order 1879	
	Liverpool Order 1879	
	Oswestry Order 1879	
	Pontypridd Order 1879	
	Ramsgate Order 1879	
	Wellington (Somerset) Order 1879	
	Ystradyfodwg Order 1879	
Local Government Board's Provisional Orders Confirmation (Aspull, &c.) Act 1879	42 & 43 Vict. c. cv	3 July 1879
An Act to confirm certain Provisional Orders of the Local Government Board relating to the Local Government District of Aspull, the Boroughs of Birmingham and Burnley, the Improvement Act District of Chiswick, the Local Government District of Keighley, the Borough of Kingston-upon-Hull, the City of Lichfield, the Improvement Act District of Ramsgate, the Local Government District of Skelton, the Boroughs of Swansea and Southampton, the Improvement Act District of Wellington (Salop), and the Local Government Districts of Widnes and Worthing.
	Aspull Order 1879	
	Birmingham Order 1879	
	Burnley Order 1879	
	Chiswick Order 1879	
	Keighley Order 1879	
	Kingston-upon-Hull Order 1879	
	Lichfield Order 1879	
	Ramsgate Order 1879	
	Skelton Order 1879	
	Swansea Order 1879	
	Southampton Order 1879	
	Wellington (Salop.) Order 1879	
	Widnes Order 1879	
	Worthing Order 1879	
Local Government Board's Provisional Orders Confirmation (Poor Law) Act 1879 (repealed)	42 & 43 Vict. c. cvi	3 July 1879
An Act to confirm certain Provisional Orders made by the Local Government Board under the provisions of the Poor Law Amendment Act, 1867, (Note: Poor Law Amendment Act 1867 (30 & 31 Vict. c. 106)) relating to the Townships of Great Barlow and Little Barlow, the Townships of Cheadle Bulkeley and Cheadle Moseley, and the Town of Plymouth. (Repealed by Statute Law (Repeals) Act 2013 (c. 2))
	Great Barlow and Little Barlow Order 1879	
	Cheadle Bulkeley and Cheadle Moseley Order 1879	
	Plymouth Order 1879	
Lancashire and Yorkshire Railway Act 1879	42 & 43 Vict. c. cvii	3 July 1879
An Act for conferring further powers on the Lancashire and Yorkshire Railway Company with relation to their undertaking; and for other purposes.
Midland Railway (Additional Powers) Act 1879	42 & 43 Vict. c. cviii	3 July 1879
An Act for conferring additional powers on the Midland Railway Company for the construction of railways and other works, the acquisition of lands, and the raising of capital; and for other purposes.
West Lancashire Railway Act 1879	42 & 43 Vict. c. cix	3 July 1879
An Act to extend the time for the completion of the railways of the West Lancashire Railway Company; and for other purposes.
Great Northern and Great Eastern Railway Companies Act 1879	42 & 43 Vict. c. cx	3 July 1879
An Act to provide for more intimate connexion between the Undertakings of the Great Northern and the Great Eastern Railway Companies.
Weardale and Shildon District Waterworks Act 1879	42 & 43 Vict. c. cxi	3 July 1879
An Act for extending the limits within which the Weardale and Shildon District Waterworks Company may supply Water; for empowering them to purchase the Undertaking of the Durham Water Company, to construct additional Works, and to raise additional Capital; and for other purposes.
Neath and Brecon Railway Act 1879	42 & 43 Vict. c. cxii	3 July 1879
An Act for effecting an Arrangement between the Neath and Brecon Railway Company and their Creditors; and for other purposes.
Crystal Palace District Gas Act 1879 (repealed)	42 & 43 Vict. c. cxiii	3 July 1879
An Act to amend the Acts relating to the Crystal Palace District Gas Company. (Repealed by South Suburban Gas Act 1928 (18 & 19 Geo. 5. c. lxxx))
Houghton-le-Spring District Gas Act 1879	42 & 43 Vict. c. cxiv	3 July 1879
An Act for incorporating the Houghton-le-Spring District Gas Company, and for authorising them to supply with Gas the Townships of Houghton-le-Spring, Newbottle, and East Rainton, in the County of Durham; and for other purposes.
London and North-western Railway (Denbigh, Ruthin, and Corwen Railway Vesting) Act 1879	42 & 43 Vict. c. cxv	3 July 1879
An Act for vesting in the London and North-western Railway Company the Undertaking of the Denbigh, Ruthin, and Corwen Railway Company; and for other purposes.
Blackburn Improvement Act 1879 (repealed)	42 & 43 Vict. c. cxvi	3 July 1879
An Act to extend the Borough of Blackburn; to make further provision for its Local Government and Improvement; and for other purposes. (Repealed by County of Lancashire Act 1984 (c. xxi))
London and North-western Railway (New Railways) Act 1879	42 & 43 Vict. c. cxvii	3 July 1879
An Act for empowering the London and North-western Railway Company, and that Company and the Furness Railway Company jointly, to construct new Railways; and for other purposes.
Portsmouth, &c. Tramways Act 1879	42 & 43 Vict. c. cxviii	3 July 1879
An Act for authorising the construction of additional Tramways in the borough of Portsmouth, and to Cosham, in the county of Southampton; and for other purposes.
Stratford-upon-Avon Borough Act 1879	42 & 43 Vict. c. cxix	3 July 1879
An Act for vesting in the Local Board of Health for the district of Stratford-upon-Avon the undertaking of the Stratford-upon-Avon Gas Company and the bridge called Clopton Bridge; for extending the boundaries of the borough of Stratford-upon-Avon and dividing the borough into wards; for dissolving the Local Board and transferring their powers and property to the Corporation of the extended borough; and for other purposes.
Southend Waterworks Act 1879 (repealed)	42 & 43 Vict. c. cxx	3 July 1879
An Act for incorporating the Southend Waterworks Company, and for conferring powers upon them with reference to the construction and maintenance of Works, the supply of Water and otherwise; and for other purposes. (Repealed by Essex Water Order 1970 (SI 1970/786))
Colchester Waterworks Act 1879 (repealed)	42 & 43 Vict. c. cxxi	3 July 1879
An Act for re-incorporating and conferring further Powers upon the Company of Proprietors of the Colchester Waterworks for the raising of Capital; and for other purposes. (Repealed by Colchester Water Order 1957 (SI 1957/552))
Glasgow Corporation Tramways Act 1879 (repealed)	42 & 43 Vict. c. cxxii	3 July 1879
An Act to authorise the Lord Provost, Magistrates, and Council of the City of Glasgow to construct additional Tramways in the City of Glasgow and its Neighbourhood; and for other purposes. (Repealed by Glasgow Corporation (Tramways Consolidation) Order Confirmation Act 1905 (5 Edw. 7. c. cxxviii))
Glasgow Municipal Act 1879 (repealed)	42 & 43 Vict. c. cxxiii	3 July 1879
An Act to confer further powers on the Lord Provost, Magistrates, and Council of the City and Royal Burgh of Glasgow for municipal and police purposes. (Repealed by Statute Law (Repeals) Act 1995 (c. 44))
Wombwell Local Board Gas Act 1879	42 & 43 Vict. c. cxxiv	3 July 1879
An Act for effecting the sale and transfer to the Wombwell Local Board of the Undertaking of the Wombwell and Darfield Gas Company, Limited; and for other purposes.
Norwich Improvement Act 1879 (repealed)	42 & 43 Vict. c. cxxv	21 July 1879
An Act to authorise the construction of a New Road, Bridges, Approaches, and Works in or near the City of Norwich; to provide for the better care and management of closed Burial Grounds in the City; to extend the powers of the Corporation in relation to the Health and Local Government of the City; and for other purposes. (Repealed by Norwich City Council Act 1984 (c. xxiii))
Hundred of Hoo Railway Act 1879	42 & 43 Vict. c. cxxvi	21 July 1879
An Act for making a railway in the county of Kent to be called the Hundred of Hoo Railway; and for other purposes.
Great Grimsby Street Tramways Act 1879 (repealed)	42 & 43 Vict. c. cxxvii	21 July 1879
An Act to incorporate the Great Grimsby Street Tramways, Company; to authorise them to construct Tramways in the parishes of Great Grimsby and Clee, in the county of Lincoln; and for other purposes. (Repealed by Humberside Act 1982 (c. iii))
Church Fenton, Cawood, and Wistow Railway Act 1879 (repealed)	42 & 43 Vict. c. cxxviii	21 July 1879
An Act for authorising the construction of the Church Fenton, Cawood, and Wistow Railway; and for other purposes. (Repealed by Selby and Mid-Yorkshire Union Railway (Abandonment) Act 1890 (53 & 54 Vict. c. xii))
Great Northern Railway (Further Powers) Act 1879	42 & 43 Vict. c. cxxix	21 July 1879
An Act to confer further Powers on the Great Northern Railway Company and the Cheshire Lines Committee.
Birmingham Gas (Northfield and Yardley) Act 1879 (repealed)	42 & 43 Vict. c. cxxx	21 July 1879
An Act to amend the Birmingham (Corporation) Gas Act, 1875, (Note: Birmingham (Corporation) Gas Act 1875 (38 & 39 Vict. c. clxxviii)) with respect to Charges for Gas at Northfield and Yardley, in the county of Worcester; and for other purposes. (Repealed by West Midlands County Council Act 1980 (c. xi))
Arlecdon and Frizington Water Act 1879	42 & 43 Vict. c. cxxxi	21 July 1879
An Act to authorise the Whitehaven Union Rural Sanitary Authority to construct Waterworks for the supply of Water to the Special Drainage District of Arlecdon and Frizington within their District; and for other purposes.
Edinburgh Municipal and Police Act 1879 (repealed)	42 & 43 Vict. c. cxxxii	21 July 1879
An Act to amend and consolidate the Acts relating to the Municipality and Police and Roads and Streets of the City of Edinburgh; and for other purposes. (Repealed by Edinburgh Corporation Order Confirmation Act 1933 (24 & 25 Geo. 5. c. v))
Cardiff Corporation Act 1879	42 & 43 Vict. c. cxxxiii	21 July 1879
An Act to provide for the transfer to the Mayor, Aldermen, and Burgesses of the borough of Cardiff of the Cardiff Waterworks; and for other purposes.
South Shields Gas Act 1879 (repealed)	42 & 43 Vict. c. cxxxiv	21 July 1879
An Act for the granting of further powers to the South Shields Gas Company. (Repealed by Newcastle-upon-Tyne and Gateshead Gas Order 1937 (SR&O 1937/1186))
Preston Gas Act 1879	42 & 43 Vict. c. cxxxv	21 July 1879
An Act to enable the Preston Gas Company to extend their limits of supply, to raise further capital; and for other purposes.
Lancaster Gas Act 1879	42 & 43 Vict. c. cxxxvi	21 July 1879
An Act for conferring further powers on the Lancaster Gas Company.
Morecambe Gas Act 1879 (repealed)	42 & 43 Vict. c. cxxxvii	21 July 1879
An Act for incorporating and conferring Powers on the Morecambe Gas and Light Company. (Repealed by County of Lancashire Act 1984 (c. xxi))
Mirfield Gas Act 1879	42 & 43 Vict. c. cxxxviii	21 July 1879
An Act to enable the Mirfield Gas Company to extend their limits of supply and powers of lighting; to raise further capital; and for other purposes.
Taff Vale Railway Act 1879	42 & 43 Vict. c. cxxxix	21 July 1879
An Act to empower the Taff Vale Railway Company to make a New Railway and other Works, and to acquire Additional Lands, in the County of Glamorgan, and to raise Additional Capital; and for other purposes.
Ayr Harbour Amendment Act 1879	42 & 43 Vict. c. cxl	21 July 1879
An Act for enabling the Ayr Harbour Trustees to construct a Slip Dock and other Works, to acquire additional Lands, and to borrow additional Money; for sanctioning the Wet Dock constructed by them; for defining the limits of the, Harbour; and for other purposes.
Wisbech Gas Act 1879	42 & 43 Vict. c. cxli	21 July 1879
An Act for conferring powers on the Wisbech Gaslight and Coke Company.
London and North-western Railway (Additional Powers) Act 1879	42 & 43 Vict. c. cxlii	21 July 1879
An Act for conferring further powers upon the London and North-western Railway Company in connexion with their own Undertaking, and upon that Company jointly with the Great Western, the Lancashire and Yorkshire, and the Furness Railway Companies respectively in connexion with their joint Undertakings; for the Dissolution of the Buckinghamshire, the Bedford, the Chester and Holyhead, the Lancaster and Carlisle, and the Kendal and Windermere Railway Companies; and for other purposes.
Plymouth and Stonehouse Gas Act 1879	42 & 43 Vict. c. cxliii	21 July 1879
An Act for enlarging the powers of the Plymouth and Stonehouse Gaslight and Coke Company; and for other purposes.
Monmouthshire Railway and Canal Act 1879	42 & 43 Vict. c. cxliv	21 July 1879
An Act to enable the Monmouthshire Railway and Canal Company to close a portion of the Monmouthshire Canal in the borough of Newport; and for other purposes.
North British (Bothwell Railway Amalgamation) Act 1879	42 & 43 Vict. c. cxlv	21 July 1879
An Act to amalgamate the Glasgow, Bothwell, Hamilton, and Coatbridge Railway with the North British Railway Company; and for other purposes.
Furness Railway Act 1879	42 & 43 Vict. c. cxlvi	21 July 1879
An Act for conferring further powers on the Furness Railway Company for the construction of Works, the acquisition of Lands, and otherwise in relation to their Undertaking; for authorising them and the Midland Railway Company to execute Works; for empowering the Furness Railway Company to subscribe towards the Capital of the Cleator and Workington Junction Railway Company; for transferring to the Furness Railway Company a portion of certain Light Duties of the Commissioners and Trustees of the Port of Lancaster; and for other purposes.
Metropolitan Railway Act 1879	42 & 43 Vict. c. cxlvii	21 July 1879
An Act to extend the time for the completion of certain Railways and Works.
Bridport Railway Act 1879	42 & 43 Vict. c. cxlviii	21 July 1879
An Act to authorise the Bridport Railway Company to make anew railway; and for other purposes.
Pulteney Harbour Act 1879	42 & 43 Vict. c. cxlix	21 July 1879
An Act for amending the Acts relating to the British Fisheries Society;; for vesting in Trustees Pulteney, Harbour, and improving and maintaining the same; and for other purposes.
Great Eastern Railway Act 1879	42 & 43 Vict. c. cl	21 July 1879
An Act for authorising the Great Eastern Railway Company, to execute additional Works, and for conferring on them further Powers in relation to their undertaking and the undertakings of other Companies; for amending their Acts in various particulars; and for other purposes.
Manchester, Sheffield, and Lincolnshire Railway Act 1879	42 & 43 Vict. c. cli	21 July 1879
An Act for conferring further powers on the Manchester, Sheffield, and Lincolnshire Railway Company and on other companies in connexion with that Company and on the Sheffield and Midland Railway Companies Committee; and for other purposes.
Newcastle-upon-Tyne and Gateshead Gas Act 1879	42 & 43 Vict. c. clii	21 July 1879
An Act to confer further Powers on the Newcastle-upon-Tyne and Gateshead Gas Company.
South-eastern Railway Act 1879	42 & 43 Vict. c. cliii	21 July 1879
An Act to confer upon the South-eastern Railway Company further powers with reference to their own undertakings and those of other Companies; and for other purposes.
Walton-on-the-Naze and Frinton Improvement Act 1879	42 & 43 Vict. c. cliv	21 July 1879
An Act to authorise the construction of a Marine Drive, Promenade, and Sea Defences, and of Carriage Roads and a Tramway, in the parishes of Walton-le-Soken and Frinton, in the county of Essex; and for other purposes.
North British Railway, Dundee and Arbroath Joint Line Act 1879	42 & 43 Vict. c. clv	21 July 1879
An Act to give to the North British Railway Company a joint interest with the Caledonian Railway Company in the Dundee and Arbroath Railway and part of the Arbroath and Forfar Railway; and for other purposes.
Queenstown Gas and Light Act 1879	42 & 43 Vict. c. clvi	21 July 1879
An Act for incorporating and conferring Powers on the Queenstown Gas Company.
Sharpness Docks Act 1879	42 & 43 Vict. c. clvii	21 July 1879
An Act for conferring further Powers upon the Sharpness New Docks and Gloucester and Birmingham Navigation Company, for the raising of Capital, for the consolidation of Debenture Stock, and for other purposes.
Local Government Board's Provisional Order Confirmation (Artizans and Labourers Dwellings) Act 1879 (repealed)	42 & 43 Vict. c. clviii	21 July 1879
An Act to confirm a Provisional Order of the Local Government Board under the provisions of the Artizans and Labourers Dwellings Improvement Act, 1875, relating to the Borough of Derby. (Repealed by Derbyshire Act 1981 (c. xxxiv))
Gas and Water Orders Confirmation Act 1879	42 & 43 Vict. c. clix	21 July 1879
An Act for confirming certain Provisional Orders made by the Board of Trade under the Gas and Water Works Facilities Act, 1870, (Note: Gas and Water Works Facilities Act 1870 (33 & 34 Vict. c. 70)) relating to Cleethorpes Gas, Dorchester Gas, Dronfield Gas, Eckington Gas, Enfield Gas, Havant Gas, Longridge Gas, Northfleet Gas, Wantage Gas, Wellingborough Gas, Dorking Water, Herts and Essex Water, Maidstone Water, Margate Water, Mexbrough and District Water, Oystermouth Water, Rhyl District Water, Saint Alban's Water, Shoreham and District Water, Stourbridge Water, Thirsk District Water, Aldershot Gas and Water, Ventnor Gas and Water, and Ystrad Gas and Water.
	Cleethorpes Gas Order 1879	
	Dorchester Gas Order 1879	
	Dronfield Gas Order 1879	
	Eckington Gas Order 1879	
	Enfield Gas Order 1879	
	Havant Gas Order 1879	
	Longridge Gas Order 1879	
	Northfleet Gas Order 1879	
	Wantage Gas Order 1879	
	Wellingborough Gas Order 1879	
	Dorking Water Order 1879	
	Herts and Essex Water Order 1879	
	Maidstone Water Order 1879	
	Margate Water Order 1879	
	Mexbrough District Water Order 1879	
	Oystermouth Water Order 1879	
	Rhyl District Water Order 1879	
	St. Alban's Water Order 1879	
	Shoreham and District Waterworks Order 1879	
	Stourbridge Water Order 1879	
	Thirsk District Water Order 1879	
	Ventnor Gas and Water Order 1879	
	Ystrad Gas and Water Order 1879	
Wormwood Scrubs Act 1879	42 & 43 Vict. c. clx	21 July 1879
An Act to provide for the user and regulation of certain Lands at Wormwood Scrubs.
Cork Borough Court Amendment Act 1879	42 & 43 Vict. c. clxi	21 July 1879
An Act to regulate the Sittings of the Quarter Sessions Court of the Borough of Cork.
Inclosure (Whittington) Provisional Order Confirmation Act 1879	42 & 43 Vict. c. clxii	21 July 1879
An Act to confirm the Provisional Order for the inclosure of certain Lands known as Whittington Marshes and Whittington Hurst, situate in the parish of Whittington, in the county of Stafford, in pursuance of a Report of the Inclosure Commissioners for England and Wales.
Severn and Wye and Severn Bridge Railway Companies Act 1879	42 & 43 Vict. c. clxiii	21 July 1879
An Act to provide for the Amalgamation of the Severn and Wye Railway and Canal Company and the Severn Bridge Railway Company.
Belfast Central Railway Act 1879	42 & 43 Vict. c. clxiv	21 July 1879
An Act to confer further powers upon the Belfast Central Railway Company, and to make further provision for regulating their affairs.
Cambridge Street Tramways Act 1879	42 & 43 Vict. c. clxv	21 July 1879
An Act to authorise the Construction of Tramways in the Borough of Cambridge; and for other purposes.
Treferig Valley Railway Act 1879	42 & 43 Vict. c. clxvi	21 July 1879
An Act for authorising the construction of railways in the county of Glamorgan to be called "The Treferig Valley Railway;" and for other purposes.
Upper Mersey Navigation Act 1879	42 & 43 Vict. c. clxvii	21 July 1879
An Act to amend the Upper Mersey Navigation Act, 1876. (Note: Upper Mersey Navigation Act 1876 (39 & 40 Vict. c. civ))
Dublin (South) City Market Amendment Act 1879	42 & 43 Vict. c. clxviii	21 July 1879
An Act to amend the Dublin (South) City Market Act, 1876; (Note: Dublin (South) City Market Act 1876 (39 & 40 Vict. c. ccxxxii)) to enable the Company to construct new Streets; and for other purposes.
East and West India Dock Company's Act 1879 (repealed)	42 & 43 Vict. c. clxix	21 July 1879
An Act to authorise the East and West India Dock Company to acquire additional Lands; raise further Capital; and for other purposes. (Repealed by Port of London (Consolidation) Act 1920 (10 & 11 Geo. 5. c. clxxiii))
Dublin Port and Docks Act 1879	42 & 43 Vict. c. clxx	21 July 1879
An Act to give further Powers to the Dublin Port and Docks Board.
Portmadoc, Croesor and Beddgelert Tram Railway Act 1879	42 & 43 Vict. c. clxxi	21 July 1879
An Act to enable the Croesor and Portmadoc Railway Company to make and maintain a new Branch Line of Railway; to change their name; and for other purposes.
Belfast Water Act 1879	42 & 43 Vict. c. clxxii	21 July 1879
An Act to confer further powers on the Belfast Water Commissioners; and for other purposes.
London, Chatham, and Dover Railway (Sevenoaks Railway Purchase) Act 1879	42 & 43 Vict. c. clxxiii	21 July 1879
An Act for authorising the Sale and Transfer of the Undertaking of the Sevenoaks, Maidstone, and Tunbridge Railway Company to the London, Chatham, and Dover Railway Company; and for other purposes.
Ballymena and Larne Railway Act 1879	42 & 43 Vict. c. clxxiv	21 July 1879
An Act to confer further powers upon the Ballymena and; Larne Railway Company.
River Bann Navigation Act 1879	42 & 43 Vict. c. clxxv	21 July 1879
An Act for the incorporation of the Coleraine Harbour Commissioners; for vesting in them the powers of the Coleraine Town Commissioners with respect to the Navigation of the River Bann under the River Bann Navigation Act, 1863; (Note: River Bann Navigation Act 1863 (26 & 27 Vict. c. c)) for the repeal of the said Act; for the improvement of the said Navigation; and for other purposes.
London (City) Tithes Act 1879 (repealed)	42 & 43 Vict. c. clxxvi	21 July 1879
An Act for the Commutation of Tithes in the City of London; and for other purposes. (Repealed by City of London (Various Powers) Act 1950 (14 Geo. 6. c. v))
Felixstowe Railway and Dock Act 1879	42 & 43 Vict. c. clxxvii	21 July 1879
An Act to authorise the Felixstowe Railway and Pier Company to abandon the Works authorised by their Act of 1876, and to construct and maintain other Works in lieu thereof; to change the name of the Company; and for other purposes.
Grand Junction Canal Act 1879	42 & 43 Vict. c. clxxviii	21 July 1879
An Act for authorising the Company of Proprietors of the Grand Junction Canal to make a Branch Canal to Slough; and for other purposes.
West Donegal Railway Act 1879	42 & 43 Vict. c. clxxix	21 July 1879
An Act for making a Railway from the Finn Valley Railway, near the town of Stranorlar, in the county of Donegal, to the town of Donegal, in the same county; and for other purposes.
Medway Docks (Extension of Time) Act 1879	42 & 43 Vict. c. clxxx	24 July 1879
An Act to further extend the time for the purchase of Lands and for the construction of the Works authorised by the Medway Docks Act, 1866. (Note: Medway Docks Act 1866 (29 & 30 Vict. c. ccxxix))
Caledonian Railway Act 1879	42 & 43 Vict. c. clxxxi	24 July 1879
An Act for extending the periods allowed to the Caledonian Railway Company by former Acts for the acquisition of certain Lands and the completion of certain Works; for abandoning certain of their authorised Works; for enabling them to appoint Members of the Joint Committee for the management of certain portions of the undertaking of the Portpatrick Railway Company; for confirming an Agreement between them and other parties as to certain Lands and Streets at Dundee; and for other purposes.
Great Northern Railway (Ireland) Act 1879	42 & 43 Vict. c. clxxxii	24 July 1879
An Act to grant further powers to the Great Northern Railway Company (Ireland) with respect to their own Undertaking, and to enable them to purchase the Dublin and Antrim Junction and the Newry and Armagh Railways.
Alliance and Dublin Gas Act 1879	42 & 43 Vict. c. clxxxiii	24 July 1879
An Act to enable the Alliance and Dublin Consumers Gas Company to construct Tramways for the purposes of their undertaking; and for other purposes.
London Bridge Approaches Act 1879	42 & 43 Vict. c. clxxxiv	24 July 1879
An Act to empower the Corporation of London to improve the Surrey Side Approaches to London Bridge.
Whitehaven Town and Harbour Act 1879	42 & 43 Vict. c. clxxxv	24 July 1879
An Act to extend the Limits of the Town and Urban Sanitary District of Whitehaven; and for other purposes.
Birkenhead Tramways Act 1879 (repealed)	42 & 43 Vict. c. clxxxvi	24 July 1879
An Act for empowering the Birkenhead Tramways Company to construct new Tramways and to purchase the Tramways of the Hoylake and Birkenhead Rail and Tramway Company; and for other purposes. (Repealed by County of Merseyside Act 1980 (c. x))
Cork and Kinsale Junction, Cork and Bandon, West Cork, and Ilen Valley Railways Act 1879	42 & 43 Vict. c. clxxxvii	24 July 1879
An Act to authorise the Cork and Bandon Railway Company to purchase the undertakings of the Cork and Kinsale Junction Railway Company and of the West Cork Railway Company, and to acquire certain rights belonging to the Ilen Valley Railway Company; and for other purposes.
Downham and Stoke Ferry Railway Act 1879	42 & 43 Vict. c. clxxxviii	24 July 1879
An Act for authorising the construction of a Railway from the Ely and Lynn Branch of the Great Eastern Railway to Stoke Ferry; and for other purposes.
London Street Tramways (Extension) Act 1879	42 & 43 Vict. c. clxxxix	24 July 1879
An Act to authorise the London Street Tramways Company to construct additional Tramways, to raise further Money; and for other purposes.
Manchester Suburban Tramways Act 1879	42 & 43 Vict. c. cxc	24 July 1879
An Act for empowering the Manchester Suburban Tramways Company to construct further Tramways in the neighbourhood of Manchester; and for other purposes.
Rotherham Borough Extension and Sewerage Act 1879	42 & 43 Vict. c. cxci	24 July 1879
An Act to extend the borough of Rotherham, and to confer powers upon the Corporation of that borough for purchasing lands and constructing works for the disposal of sewage; also powers in relation to markets and affecting the sanitary condition and local government of the borough; and for other purposes.
Saint Helens and District Tramways Act 1879	42 & 43 Vict. c. cxcii	24 July 1879
An Act for incorporating the Saint Helens and District Tramways Company, and for empowering them to construct Tramways in the borough and district of Saint Helens, in the county of Lancaster; and for other purposes.
Tramways Orders Confirmation Act 1879	42 & 43 Vict. c. cxciii	11 August 1879
An Act for confirming certain Provisional Orders made by the Board of Trade under the Tramways Act, 1870, (Note: Tramways Act 1870 (33 & 34 Vict. c. 78)) relating to Bristol Tramways (Extensions), Briton Ferry and Swansea Tramways, Burnley and District Tramways, Chesterfield, Brampton, and Whittington Tramways, Crewe and District, Tramways, Derby Tramways, Dewsbury, Batley, and Birstal Tramways (Extension), Ipswich Tramways, Leamington and Warwick Tramways, Liverpool Corporation Tramways, Newcastle-upon-Tyne Tramways, North London Suburban Tramways, Oxford Tramways, Staffordshire Tramways, Stoke-upon-Trent, Fenton, Longton, and District Tramways, Sunderland Corporation Tramways, Sunderland Tramways (Extension), Swansea Tramways (Extension), Tynemouth and District Tramways, Wigan Tramways, York Tramways; and for empowering the Board of Trade to grant licenses for the use for limited periods, by way of experiment, of steam or any mechanical power upon tramways in certain cases.
	Bristol Tramways (Extensions) Order 1879	
	Briton Ferry and Swansea Tramways Order 1879	
	Burnley and District Tramways Order 1879	
	Chesterfield, Brampton and Whittington Tramways Order 1879	
	Crewe and District Tramways Order 1879	
	Derby Tramways Order 1879	
	Ipswich Tramways Order 1879	
	Leamington and Warwick Tramways Order 1879	
	Liverpool Corporation Tramways Order 1879	
	Newcastle-upon-Tyne Tramways Order 1879	
	North London Suburban Tramways Order 1879	
	Oxford Tramways Order 1879	
	Staffordshire Tramways Order 1879	
	Stoke-upon-Trent, Fenton, Longton and District Tramways Order 1879	
	Sunderland Corporation Tramways Order 1879	
	Sunderland Tramways Extension Order 1879	
	Swansea Tramways (Extension) Order 1879	
	Tynemouth and District Tramways Order 1879	
	Wigan Tramways Order 1879	
	York Tramways Order 1879	
New Forest Act 1879	42 & 43 Vict. c. cxciv	11 August 1879
An Act to amend the New Forest Act, 1877. (Note: New Forest Act 1877 (40 & 41 Vict. c. cxxi))
Freiston Shore Reclamation Act 1879	42 & 43 Vict. c. cxcv	11 August 1879
An Act for incorporation of the Freiston Shore Reclamation Company, and for authorising them to reclaim certain lands in the Estuary of the Wash; and for other purposes.
Tring Poor's Land (Sale and Exchange) Act 1879	42 & 43 Vict. c. cxcvi	11 August 1879
An Act to enable the Trustees of certain Poor's Allotment Lands situated in the parish of Tring and county of Hertford to sell or exchange the same; and for other purposes.
South London Tramways Act 1879	42 & 43 Vict. c. cxcvii	11 August 1879
An Act for making Tramways in the county of Surrey to be called "The South London Tramways"; and for other purposes.
Metropolis Management (Thames River Prevention of Floods) Amendment Act 1879	42 & 43 Vict. c. cxcviii	11 August 1879
An Act to amend the Metropolis Management Act, 1855, (Note: Metropolis Management Act 1855 (18 & 19 Vict. c. 120)) and the Acts amending the same, so far as relates to the protection of the Metropolis from Floods and Inundations caused by the overflow of the River Thames; and for other purposes.
Blackpool Improvement Act 1879	42 & 43 Vict. c. cxcix	11 August 1879
An Act to extend the borough of Blackpool, and to enable the Mayor, Aldermen, and Burgesses thereof to make New Streets, Street Improvements, and other Works; to extend the limits of Gas supply; and to make further provision for the improvement and government of the borough; and for other purposes.
Leicester Corporation Act 1879	42 & 43 Vict. c. cc	11 August 1879
An Act to confer further Powers on the Mayor, Aldermen, and Burgesses of the Borough of Leicester.
Metropolitan and District Railways (City Lines and Extensions) Act 1879	42 & 43 Vict. c. cci	11 August 1879
An Act to authorise the Metropolitan and Metropolitan District Railway Companies to make certain railways for completing the Inner Circle and connecting their railways with the East London Railway, also a new street and certain street improvements; and to confer various powers upon the Corporation of London, the Metropolitan Board of Works, and other public bodies in reference to the undertaking; and for other purposes.
Over Darwen Improvement Act 1879	42 & 43 Vict. c. ccii	11 August 1879
An Act for extending the Borough of Over Darwen, and for the Improvement of the said Borough; and for other purposes.
Stafford and Uttoxeter Railway Act 1879	42 & 43 Vict. c. cciii	11 August 1879
An Act to confer further powers on the Stafford and Uttoxeter Railway Company; and for other purposes.
Nottingham Improvement Act 1879	42 & 43 Vict. c. cciv	11 August 1879
An Act for enabling the Mayor, Aldermen, and Burgesses of the Borough of Nottingham to purchase Bulwell Forest for the purposes of a Public Park and Cemetery, to construct additional Gasworks, to acquire the undertaking of the Nottingham Waterworks Company; and for other purposes.
North Staffordshire Railway Act 1879	42 & 43 Vict. c. ccv	11 August 1879
An Act for authorising the North Staffordshire Railway Company to construct certain Railways and Works for the improvement of their system in the counties of Stafford and Chester; to abandon portions of certain Railways; to appoint Directors of the Cheadle Railway Company; to amend the Company's Acts with respect to Tolls and Charges; to provide for the establishment of Hotels; and for other purposes.
East Indian Railway Company Purchase Act 1879 (repealed)	42 & 43 Vict. c. ccvi	11 August 1879
An Act to provide for the vesting of the Undertaking of the East Indian Railway Company in the Secretary of State in Council of India; and for other purposes. (Repealed by Statute Law (Repeals) Act 2013 (c. 2))
Brentford and Isleworth Tramways Act 1879	42 & 43 Vict. c. ccvii	11 August 1879
An Act to authorise the construction of Street Tramways in, Brentford and Isleworth in the county of Middlesex; and for other purposes.
Llandisilio Commissioners Act 1879	42 & 43 Vict. c. ccviii	11 August 1879
An Act for appointing Commissioners and vesting in them certain lands in the parish of Llandisilio; and enabling them to form a Public Recreation Ground and Reading Room; and for other purposes.
Girvan and Portpatrick Junction Railway Act 1879	42 & 43 Vict. c. ccix	11 August 1879
An Act to enable the Girvan and Portpatrick Junction Railway Company to borrow further money; and for other purposes.
Ballymena and Portglenone Railway Act 1879	42 & 43 Vict. c. ccx	11 August 1879
An Act to authorise the construction of a Railway in the county of Antrim from Ballymena to Portglenone; and for other purposes.
Ramsgate and Margate Tramways Act 1879	42 & 43 Vict. c. ccxi	11 August 1879
An Act to authorise the construction of tramways in or near Ramsgate, Margate, and other places in the county of Kent; and for other purposes.
Banbury and Cheltenham Direct Railway Act 1879	42 & 43 Vict. c. ccxii	11 August 1879
An Act to empower the Banbury and Cheltenham Direct Railway Company to raise further money; and for other purposes.
Liverpool (Corporation) Electric Lighting Act 1879 (repealed)	42 & 43 Vict. c. ccxiii	11 August 1879
An Act to make further provision for the Lighting of the Borough of Liverpool, and to extend the powers of the Mayor, Aldermen, and Burgesses of the Borough in relation to the supply of Light by Electricity; and for other purposes. (Repealed by Liverpool Corporation Act 1921 (11 & 12 Geo. 5. c. lxxiv))
Alloa Railway Act 1879	42 & 43 Vict. c. ccxiv	11 August 1879
An Act for making a Railway from the South Alloa Branch of the Caledonian Railway to Alloa; and for other purposes.
Derby Improvement Act 1879	42 & 43 Vict. c. ccxv	11 August 1879
An Act to extend the powers of the Corporation of the Borough of Derby, in the county of Derby, with respect to the Local Government and Improvement of the Borough; to enable the Corporation to acquire the Derby Waterworks Company's Undertaking; and for other purposes.
Halesowen Railway Act 1879	42 & 43 Vict. c. ccxvi	11 August 1879
An Act to confer further powers on the Halesowen Railway Company; and for other purposes.
Knutsford Light and Water Act 1879	42 & 43 Vict. c. ccxvii	11 August 1879
An Act for incorporating the Knutsford Light and Water Company; and for other purposes.
Ardmillan Reclamation Amendment Act 1879	42 & 43 Vict. c. ccxviii	11 August 1879
An Act to revive and extend the powers of the Ardmillan Reclamation Company for the compulsory purchase of Lands and completion of Works; and for other purposes.
Knightsbridge and other Crown Lands Act 1879	42 & 43 Vict. c. ccxix	15 August 1879
An Act to authorise the sale of a strip of land adjoining the Knightsbridge Barracks to the Metropolitan Board of Works for the improvement of the Knightsbridge Road, to transfer the management of a piece of Crown land at Hampton Court from the Commissioners of Her Majesty's Woods to the Commissioners of Her Majesty's Works, and vest the management of land left vacant on the reconstruction and improvement of Gloucester Gate Bridge, Regent's Park, in the Commissioners of Her Majesty's Woods.
Mungret Agricultural School, &c. Act or the Mungret Agricultural School, &c. Act 1879 (repealed)	42 & 43 Vict. c. ccxx	15 August 1879
An Act to enable the Lord Lieutenant of Ireland, with the assent of Her Majesty's Treasury, to vary the Trusts of the Mungret Agricultural School and Model Farm in the county of Limerick. (Repealed by Statute Law (Repeals) Act 2013 (c. 2))
St. Giles Ancient Church (Edinburgh) Act 1879	42 & 43 Vict. c. ccxxi	15 August 1879
An Act to make provision in regard to the Restoration of the, Ancient Church of St. Giles, in the city of Edinburgh.
Erne Lough and River Act 1879	42 & 43 Vict. c. ccxxii	15 August 1879
An Act to grant further time for proceeding with the execution of Works for improving the Navigation of the Lough and River Erne.
Easton Neston Mineral and Towcester, Roade, and Olney Junction Railway Act 1879	42 & 43 Vict. c. ccxxiii	15 August 1879
An Act to authorise the making and maintaining of the Easton Neston Mineral and Towcester, Roade, and Olney Junction Railway; and for other purposes.
Enniskillen, Bundoran, and Sligo Railway (Donegal Extension) and Enniskillen and Bundoran Extension Railway (Abandonment) Act 1879	42 & 43 Vict. c. ccxxiv	15 August 1879
An Act for making a Railway from the Enniskillen and Bundoran Railway at or near the Castlecaldwell Station to the town of Donegal, to be called "The Fermanagh and Donegal Railway," and other works; and for other purposes.
Blackburn and Over Darwen Tramways Act 1879 (repealed)	42 & 43 Vict. c. ccxxv	15 August 1879
An Act to authorise the construction of Tramways for connecting the Towns of Blackburn and Over Darwen; and for other purposes. (Repealed by County of Lancashire Act 1984 (c. xxi))

=== Private acts ===
Short title	Citation	Royal assent
Long title
Ryder Richardson's Estate Act 1879	42 & 43 Vict. c. 1 Pr.	23 May 1879
An Act to confirm certain Conveyances made by the Trustees of the Will of William Ryder Richardson, deceased, and to give further Powers for enabling the appropriation and sale of Land for Building Sites, and for other purposes.
Berry Estate Act 1879	42 & 43 Vict. c. 2 Pr.	3 July 1879
An Act to authorise the feuing of parts of the Lands of Tayfield, Northfield, and others, in the parish of Forgan or Saint Phyllans and county of Fife.
Roper's Estate Act 1879	42 & 43 Vict. c. 3 Pr.	3 July 1879
An Act to make provision with respect to the shares of Thomas Roper, deceased, in the capital and business of the firm of Harrison, Ainslie, and Company.
Stuckgown Estate Act 1879	42 & 43 Vict. c. 4 Pr.	3 July 1879
An Act to authorise the sale of the Estate of Stuckgown in the County of Dumbarton, and to provide for the application of the price thereof.
Edwards Infants' Succession Duty Act 1879	42 & 43 Vict. c. 5 Pr.	21 July 1879
An Act to charge certain Moneys on the interests of Jessie Edwards, Anna Dorothea Edwards, Eyre Evans Edwards, and Mary Eliza Edwards, infants, in a Moiety of certain Estates in the counties of Limerick, Dublin, and Queen, and the city of Dublin in Ireland; and for other purposes. (Repealed as to the Republic of Ireland by the Statute Law Revision Act 2012, ss 2(1) & 3(1) & Sch 2, Pt 3.)
Goldsmid Estate Act 1879	42 & 43 Vict. c. 6 Pr.	21 July 1879
An Act to authorise the granting of Building and Improvement Leases of the Estates devised by the Will of Sir Isaac Lyon Goldsmid, Baronet; and for other purposes.
Leitrim Estates Act 1879	42 & 43 Vict. c. 7 Pr.	21 July 1879
An Act for giving effect to a compromise of certain opposing claims affecting the Estates of William Sydney Earl of Leitrim, deceased, in the Counties of Leitrim, Donegal, Galway, and Kildare, in Ireland. (Repealed as to the Republic of Ireland by the Statute Law Revision Act 2012, ss 2(1) & 3(1) & Sch 2, Pt 3.)
Arundel Estate Act 1879	42 & 43 Vict. c. 8 Pr.	11 August 1879
An Act for enlarging the leasing powers relating to the Estates annexed to the Earldom of Arundel, and for effecting an exchange of parts of the same Estates, and for authorising exchanges and sales of other parts of the same Estates; and for other purposes.

=== Sources ===
- Chronological Table of the Statutes. 2009. Part 1. Pages 506 to 509.
- Chronological Table and Index of the Statutes, 13th Ed, 1896, vol 1, pp 495 to 498
- Paterson (ed). The Practical Statutes of the Session 1879. Printed by Horace Cox. 1879. Google
- The Law Reports: The Public General Statutes, passed in . . . 1879. Printed for William Clowes and Sons, printers to the Incorporated Council of Law Reporting for England and Wales. 1879. Volume 14: .
- The Public General Statutes. 1879. .
- The Public General Acts of the United Kingdom of Great Britain and Ireland: passed in the Forty-Second and Forty-Third Years of . . . Victoria. Edward Bret Ince for the proprietors of the Law Journal Reports. 1879. .
- The Public General Acts Passed in the Forty-Second and Forty-Third Years of the Reign of Her Majesty Queen Victoria. London: Eyre and Spottiswoode. 1879 – via Google Books.
- The Local Acts. 1879. Google. Chapters i to lxx: Google.
- The Public General Statutes affecting Scotland. Printed by authority of William Blackwood and Sons. Edinburgh. 1879. Google
- "Solicitor's Journal" (1879) 67 The Law Times 347 and 348 (13 September 1879)
- "New Acts of Parliament" in "Magistrates' Law" (1879) 67 The Law Times 267, 285, 305, 334, 350, 362, 424 and 438; (1879 and 1880) 68 The Law Times 122 and 189
- "Legislation and Jurisprudence" (1879) 67 The Law Times 7, 61, 77, 133, 154, 173, 190, 209, 227, 280, 299 and 328
- The Law Times. Statutes of the United Kingdom: 42 & 43 Victoria, A D 1879.
- "Legislation of the Session" (1879) 14 The Law Journal 371 (14 June 1879)
- "The Session of 1879". The Law Journal. 14: 502. 1879.
- "Business in Parliament". The Law Journal. 14: 128. 1879.
- "Law in Parliament". The Law Journal. 14: 132, 396, 412, 438, 468, 491 and 503. 1879.
- "Legislation of the Year" (1879) 23 The Solicitors' Journal 890, 902, 917, 949 and 950
- "Legislation of the Week" (1879) 23 The Solicitors' Journal 126, 147, 324, 342, 369, 386, 409, 429, 449, 467, 507, 532, 549, 569, 588, 608, 626, 646, 664, 685, 709, 726, 747, 765, 786, 807, 825 and 841
- The Solicitors Journal. The Public General Statutes: 42 & 43 Victoriae, 1879.
- "Statutes of the Session" (1879) 43 The Justice of the Peace 569, 570 and 585 to 587
- "Statutes 42 Vict" (1879) 43 The Justice of the Peace 243, 256, 418 and 450
- "Statutes 42 & 43 Vict" (1879) 43 The Justice of the Peace 402, 465, 482, 497, 512, 529, 545, 561, 576, 593, 608, 624, 639, 688 and 705
- "Legislative Intelligence" (1879) 43 The Justice of the Peace 129, 135, 144, 151, 161, 167, 179, 183, 193, 199, 210, 215, 224, 231, 242, 247, 263, 275, 279, 289, 295, 304, 311, 320, 327, 336, 343, 353, 359, 369, 384, 391, 401, 407, 417, 423, 433, 439, 449, 455, 463, 471, 481, 487, 496, 503, 511, 519, 528, 535 and 543
- "Statutes affecting Scotland" (1879) 23 The Journal of Jurisprudence 586 to 589
- Frederick Hallard. A few Words on the Law and Legislation of the past Year. Edinburgh. 1879.
- "The Progress of Legislation" (1879) 13 Irish Law Times and Solicitors' Journal 210 (19 April 1879)
- The Irish Law Times and Solicitors' Journal. Public General Statutes, 42 & 43 Victoriae (1879).
- "Students' Statutes" (1879) 1 The Law Students' Journal 128 to 131 and 140 to 141

== See also ==
- List of acts of the Parliament of the United Kingdom
