= Merionethshire Railway =

19th-century proposed railway in Wales

Overview
- Headquarters: London
- Locale: Gwynedd, Wales

Technical
- Track gauge: Mixed 1 ft 11 1/2 in (597 mm) and 4 ft 8 1/2 in (1,435 mm) standard gauge
- Length: 8 miles 41 chains (13.7 km)

Merionethshire Railway Act 1871 (Note: Section 1.)
- Act of Parliament
- Parliament of the United Kingdom
- Long title: An Act for making a Railway from Festiniog in the county of Merioneth to the railway of the Cambrian Railways Company, in the parish of Llandecwyn in the same county; and for other purposes.
- Citation: 34 & 35 Vict. c. lxxii
- Territorial extent: United Kingdom

Dates
- Royal assent: 29 June 1871
- Commencement: 29 June 1871 (Note: The Acts of Parliament (Commencement) Act 1793.)
- Repealed: 12 July 1887

Other legislation
- Repealed by: Merionethshire Railway (Abandonment) Act 1887

Status: Repealed

Text of statute as originally enacted

Merionethshire Railway (Extension of Time) Act 1876
- Act of Parliament
- Parliament of the United Kingdom
- Long title: An Act to extend the time for the completion of the Merionethshire Railway.
- Citation: 39 & 40 Vict. c. lxxvii
- Territorial extent: United Kingdom

Dates
- Royal assent: 27 June 1876
- Commencement: 27 June 1876
- Repealed: 12 July 1887

Other legislation
- Repealed by: Merionethshire Railway (Abandonment) Act 1887

Status: Repealed

Merionethshire Railway (Extension of Time) Act 1879
- Act of Parliament
- Parliament of the United Kingdom
- Long title: An Act to further extend the time for the completion of the Merionethshire Railway.
- Citation: 42 & 43 Vict. c. liii
- Territorial extent: United Kingdom

Dates
- Royal assent: 3 July 1879
- Commencement: 3 July 1879
- Repealed: 12 July 1887

Other legislation
- Repealed by: Merionethshire Railway (Abandonment) Act 1887

Status: Repealed

Text of statute as originally enacted

Merionethshire Railway (Extension of Time) Act 1882
- Act of Parliament
- Parliament of the United Kingdom
- Long title: An Act to further extend the Time for the Completion of the Merionethshire Railway.
- Citation: 45 & 46 Vict. c. xvi
- Territorial extent: United Kingdom

Dates
- Royal assent: 19 May 1882
- Commencement: 19 May 1882
- Repealed: 12 July 1887

Other legislation
- Repealed by: Merionethshire Railway (Abandonment) Act 1887

Status: Repealed

Text of statute as originally enacted

Merionethshire Railway (Abandonment) Act 1887
- Act of Parliament
- Parliament of the United Kingdom
- Long title: An Act for the abandonment of the railways authorised by the Merionethshire Railway Act 1871.
- Citation: 50 & 51 Vict. c. cviii
- Territorial extent: United Kingdom

Dates
- Royal assent: 12 July 1887
- Commencement: 12 July 1887
- Repealed: 31 January 2013

Other legislation
- Repeals/revokes: Merionethshire Railway Act 1871; Merionethshire Railway (Extension of Time) Act 1876; Merionethshire Railway (Extension of Time) Act 1879; Merionethshire Railway (Extension of Time) Act 1882
- Repealed by: Statute Law (Repeals) Act 2013

Status: Repealed

Text of statute as originally enacted

The Merionethshire Railway (MR) was a proposed 1 ft 11 3/4 in (603 mm) and 4 ft 8 1/2 in (1,435 mm) dual gauge railway in south Caernarfonshire (now part of Gwynedd), North Wales, United Kingdom. It was incorporated by an act of Parliament, the Merionethshire Railway Act 1871 (34 & 35 Vict. c. lxxii) on 29 June 1871. Work to build the line never started, though parliamentary extensions of time to do so were obtained by the Merionethshire Railway (Extension of Time) Act 1876 (39 & 40 Vict. c. lxxvii) and the Merionethshire Railway (Extension of Time) Act 1879 (42 & 43 Vict. c. liii), and the Merionethshire Railway (Extension of Time) Act 1882 (45 & 46 Vict. c. xvi). Powers to build the line lapsed in 1885 and were abandoned by the passing of the Merionethshire Railway (Abandonment) Act 1887 (50 & 51 Vict. c.cviii) on 12 July 1887.

== Route ==
The line was to start at an end-on junction with the Festiniog and Blaenau Railway (F&BR) at Llan Ffestiniog and head southwest to make a triangular junction with the Cambrian Railways just north of Talsarnau, though the clearest published map of the route shows a triangular junction at both ends of the line.

(1.) A railway (No. 1), three miles one furlong eight chains and thirty-five links or thereabouts in length, commencing in the parish of Festiniog in the county of Merioneth by a junction with the Festiniog and Blaenau Railway, and terminating in the parish of Maentwrog, in the same county, in a plantation on a farm called Hendre Mûr, belonging or reputed to belong to Morgan Lloyd, Esquire.

(2.) A railway (No. 2), six miles seven furlongs eight chains and five links or thereabouts in length, commencing by a junction with the first-mentioned railway (No. 1), and terminating in the parish of Llandecwyn in the said county of Merioneth by a junction with the railway of the Cambrian Railways Company. — Section 5, Merionethshire Railway Act 1871

== Gauges ==
The junction with the F&BR meant the MR would use the same gauge, which was formally 1 ft 11 3/4 in (603 mm), though the act cited "2-foot gauge". While the bill was before Parliament, the 4 ft 8 1/2 in (1,435 mm) standard gauge Bala and Festiniog Railway (B&FR) (a proxy for the Great Western Railway) obtained the Bala and Festiniog Railway Act 1873 (36 & 37 Vict. c. ccvii), authorising it to build from Bala Junction to Blaenau Ffestiniog where it aimed to tap the town's prolific slate output. This proposed line was to meet the narrow gauge F&BR at Llan Ffestiniog, so the MR's bill was updated to allow mixed gauge by laying a third rail.

== Purposes ==
By proposing the line its backers sought to threaten the Festiniog Railway into reducing charges and raising service levels.

== Actions ==
The Bala and Festiniog Railway (B&FR) reached Llan Ffestiniog in 1882 and converted the F&BR to standard gauge in 1883. This long, mountainous route of the B&FR posed little threat to the Festiniog Railway (FR). Most of the slate traffic it did carry was taken to the FR at Blaenau Ffestiniog.

The northern end of the MR's planned route would have followed the course of the Bala and Festiniog line from Festiniog south to near Trawsfynydd Lake Halt. It then ran westerly, descending along the south side of the valley of the Afon Dwyryd running parallel to the course of the FR on the northern side of the valley. It would have ended at interchange facilities with the Cambrian near Talsarnau directly competing with the FR's facilities at Minffordd.

== See also ==
- British narrow gauge railways

== Bibliography ==
- Boyd, James I.C. (1975) [1959]. The Festiniog Railway 1800 - 1974; Vol. 1 - History and Route. The British Narrow Gauge Railway. Blandford: The Oakwood Press. ISBN 978-0-85361-167-7. OCLC 2074549. B1A.
- Boyd, James I.C. (1988) [1972]. Narrow Gauge Railways in South Caernarvonshire – Volume 1. Headington: The Oakwood Press. ISBN 978-0-85361-365-7. OCLC 20417464.
- Southern, D. W. (1995). Bala Junction to Blaenau Ffestiniog. Railways of North Wales. Stockport: Foxline Publishing. ISBN 978-1-870119-34-4. Scenes from the Past No.25.

== Further material ==
- Baughan, Peter E. (1991). A Regional History of the Railways of Great Britain: North and Mid Wales. Regional railway history series (2nd ed.). Nairn: David St John Thomas Publisher. ISBN 978-0-946537-59-4. OL 11571058M. Vol 11.
- Richards, Alun John (2001). The Slate Railways of Wales. Llanrwst: Gwasg Carreg Gwalch. ISBN 978-0-86381-689-5.
- Statute Law Repeals: Nineteenth Report, Draft Statute Law (Repeals) Bill. Great Britain Law Commission, The Stationery Office, 2012, p. 272.
