= Statute Law Revision Act 1894 =

Act of the Parliament of the United Kingdom

Statute Law Revision Act 1894 (Note: Section 5.)
- Act of Parliament
- Parliament of the United Kingdom
- Long title: An Act for further promoting the Revision of the Statute Law by repealing Enactments which have ceased to be in force or have become unnecessary.
- Citation: 57 & 58 Vict. c. 56
- Territorial extent: United Kingdom

Dates
- Royal assent: 25 August 1894
- Commencement: 25 August 1894 (Note: The Acts of Parliament (Commencement) Act 1793.)
- Repealed: 5 November 1993
Other legislation
Amended by	Statute Law Revision Act 1908; Courts Act 1971; Administration of Justice Act 1977
Repealed by	Statute Law (Repeals) Act 1993
Relates to	Repeal of Obsolete Statutes Act 1856; See Statute Law Revision Act

Status: Repealed

Text of statute as originally enacted

The Statute Law Revision Act 1894 (57 & 58 Vict. c. 56) was an act of the Parliament of the United Kingdom.

== Provisions ==
=== Substituted repeals ===
Section 3 of the act provided that the second schedule to the act was to be substituted for so much of the Statute Law Revision (No. 2) Act 1888 (51 & 52 Vict. c. 57) and of the Statute Law Revision Act 1892 as related to the Small Debt (Scotland) Act 1837 and to 4 & 5 Vict. c. 10, and that the said Statute Law Revision Acts were to be read and construed accordingly.

== Subsequent developments ==
Section 3 of, and the first and second schedules to, the act were repealed by section 1 of, and the schedule to, the Statute Law Revision Act 1908 (8 Edw. 7. c. 49), which came into force on 21 December 1908.

The words "to the court of the county palatine of Lancaster or" in section 2 of the act were repealed by section 56(4) of, and part II of schedule 11 to, the Courts Act 1971, which came into force on 1 January 1972.

Section 2 of the act was repealed by section 32(4) of, and part V of schedule 5 to, the Administration of Justice Act 1977, which came into force on 29 July 1977.

The enactments which were repealed (whether for the whole or any part of the United Kingdom) by the act were repealed so far as they extended to the Isle of Man by section 1(1) of, and schedule 1 to, the Statute Law Revision (Isle of Man) Act 1991, which came into force on 25 July 1991.

The whole act was repealed by section 1(1) of, and group 1 of part XVI of schedule 1 to, the Statute Law (Repeals) Act 1993, which came into force on 5 November 1993.

The act was retained for the Republic of Ireland by section 2(2)(a) of, and part 4 of schedule 1 to, the Statute Law Revision Act 2007, which came into force on 8 May 2007.

== See also ==
- Statute Law Revision Act
