= Law of Property Acts =

Acts of the Parliament of the United Kingdom

The Law of Property Acts or the 1925 land reforms commonly refers to a series of Acts of Parliament passed in the United Kingdom to reform the system of land holding, registration and transfer. The principal Acts are the Law of Property Act 1925 (15 & 16 Geo. 5. c. 20), the Land Registration Act 1925 (which was largely repealed and updated by the Land Registration Act 2002), the Land Charges Act 1925 (15 & 16 Geo. 5. c. 22) (which was largely repealed and updated by the Land Charges Act 1972), the Settled Land Act 1925 (15 & 16 Geo. 5. c. 18) and the Trustee Act 1925 (15 & 16 Geo. 5. c. 19) (both of which were reformed by the Trusts of Land and Appointment of Trustees Act 1996).

== Background ==
In 1913, Lord Haldane, the then-Lord Chancellor, prepared two bills which were intended to improve conveyancing. These were heavily modifications of the scheme which had been proposed by Edward Parker Wolstenholme as early as 1896. These bills were later consolidated into one, which intended to create "a complete, indivisible and indestructible ownership of the fee simple". This bill also aimed to give every proprietor the power to sell land with good title to a purchaser for value in a way which would override any subordinate interests which were not protected by a caution or inhibition. This bill was never enacted because of the beginning of World War I.

After the War, the focus returned to the reform of the system of land law. A committee was appointed in 1919, headed by Sir Leslie Scott, to report to the Lord Chancellor on land transfer. This Lands Requisition Committee proposed a bill, which was introduced to Parliament in 1920 by Lord Birkenhead. This became law on 29 June 1922 and was 313 pages of amendments of numerous real property statutes. The Act then had to be consolidated, so that the provisions were allocated to their proper statute. The 1922 Act had been intended to take force on 1 January 1925 but as the consolidating bills were not ready until the summer of 1924, the commencement was postponed until 1 January 1926: see Hansard HC Deb (15 May 1922) vol 154 cols 89-175, Second Reading, Solicitor General, Sir Leslie Scott.

== See also ==
- English land law

== Bibliography ==
- A Simpson, A History of the Land Law (2nd edn OUP 1986)
- MR Cohen, ‘Property and Sovereignty’ (1927) 13 Cornell LQ 8
- S Anderson, ‘Land Law Texts and the Explanation of 1925’ (1984) 37 Current Legal Problems 63
- TBF Ruoff, An Englishman Looks at the Torrens System (1957)
