= Law of Property Act 1922 =

Act of the Parliament of the United Kingdom

Law of Property Act 1922 (Note: Section 191(1).)
- Act of Parliament
- Parliament of the United Kingdom
- Long title: An Act to assimilate and amend the law of Real and Personal Estate, to abolish copyhold and other special tenures, to amend the law relating to commonable lands and of intestacy, and to amend the Wills Act, 1837, the Settled Land Acts, 1882 to 1890, the Conveyancing Acts, 1881 to 1911, the Trustee Act, 1893, and the Land Transfer Acts, 1875 and 1897.
- Citation: 12 & 13 Geo. 5. c. 16
- Territorial extent: England and Wales (Note: Section 191(3).)

Dates
- Royal assent: 29 June 1922
- Commencement: 1 January 1926 (Note: Section 191(2), as postponed by the Law of Property Act (Postponement) Act 1924 (15 & 16 Geo. 5. c. 4).)

Other legislation
- Amends: See § Repealed enactments
- Repeals/revokes: See § Repealed enactments
- Amended by: Law of Property Act (Postponement) Act 1924; Law of Property (Amendment) Act 1924; Settled Land Act 1925; Land Charges Act 1925; Law of Property Act 1925; Universities and College Estates Act 1925; Law of Property (Amendment) Act 1926; Statute Law Revision Act 1948; Mental Health Act 1959; Statute Law (Repeals) Act 1969; Endowments and Glebe Measure 1976; Solicitors' Incorporated Practices Order 1991; Trusts of Land and Appointment of Trustees Act 1996; Commonhold and Leasehold Reform Act 2002
- Relates to: Housing Act 1925; Housing (Scotland) Act 1925; Town Planning Act 1925; Town Planning (Scotland) Act 1925; Settled Land Act 1925; Trustee Act 1925; Law of Property Act 1925; Land Registration Act 1925; Land Charges Act 1925; Administration of Estates Act 1925; Universities and College Estates Act 1925; Supreme Court of Judicature (Consolidation) Act 1925; Workmen's Compensation Act 1925

Status: Partially repealed

Text of statute as originally enacted

Revised text of statute as amended

Text of the Law of Property Act 1922 as in force today (including any amendments) within the United Kingdom, from legislation.gov.uk.

The Law of Property Act 1922 (12 & 13 Geo. 5. c. 16) is an act of the Parliament of the United Kingdom that amended the law of real and personal estate in England and Wales, abolishing copyhold and other special tenures, reforming the law of intestacy, and amending the Settled Land Acts, the Conveyancing Acts, the Trustee Act 1893, and the Land Transfer Acts.

== Provisions ==
=== Repealed enactments ===
Section 1(6) of the act repealed the Statute of Uses Act 1535 (27 Hen. 8. c. 10) and section 61 of the Conveyancing Act 1881 (44 & 45 Vict. c. 41).

Section 17(5) of the act repealed section 32 of the Fines and Recoveries Act 1833 (3 & 4 Will. 4. c. 74).

Section 44(7) of the act repealed the Settled Land Act 1889 (52 & 53 Vict. c. 36).

== Subsequent developments ==
Law of Property Act (Postponement) Act 1924 (Note: Section 2.)
- Act of Parliament
- Parliament of the United Kingdom
- Long title: An Act to postpone the coming into operation of the Law of Property Act, 1922, until the first day of January, nineteen hundred and twenty-six.
- Citation: 15 & 16 Geo. 5. c. 4
- Territorial extent: United Kingdom

Dates
- Royal assent: 18 December 1924
- Commencement: 18 December 1924 (Note: The Acts of Parliament (Commencement) Act 1793.)
- Repealed: 23 May 1950

Other legislation
- Amends: Law of Property Act 1922
- Repealed by: Statute Law Revision Act 1950

Status: Repealed

Text of statute as originally enacted

The Law of Property Act (Postponement) Act 1924 (15 & 16 Geo. 5. c. 4) postponed the commencement of the act from 1 January 1925 to 1 January 1926, allowing time for a series of consolidating statutes to be prepared.

The Law of Property (Amendment) Act 1924 (15 & 16 Geo. 5. c. 5) declared, by section 1 of, and the first schedule to, that act, the enactments repealed by the principal act, and made further amendments to its provisions regarding the enfranchisement of copyholds and the conversion of perpetually renewable leaseholds into long terms.

The whole of the 1924 act was repealed by section 1(1) of, and the first schedule to, the Statute Law Revision Act 1950 (14 Geo. 6. c. 6), which came into force on 23 May 1950.

Much of the act was subsequently repealed by the Settled Land Act 1925 (15 & 16 Geo. 5. c. 18), the Law of Property Act 1925 (15 & 16 Geo. 5. c. 20) and the Land Charges Act 1925 (15 & 16 Geo. 5. c. 22), which came into force on 1 January 1926.
