= Law of Property (Amendment) Act 1924 =

Act of the Parliament of the United Kingdom

Law of Property (Amendment) Act 1924 (Note: Section 12(1).)
- Act of Parliament
- Parliament of the United Kingdom
- Long title: An Act to amend the Law of Property Act, 1922, and the enactments thereby affected, and to facilitate the consolidation of the law relating to conveyancing and property, settled land, trustees, the registration of pending actions, annuities, writs, orders, deeds of arrangement and land charges, the administration of estates, the registration of title to land and university and college estates.
- Citation: 15 & 16 Geo. 5. c. 5
- Territorial extent: England and Wales (Note: Section 12(4).)

Dates
- Royal assent: 18 December 1924
- Commencement: 1 January 1926 (Note: Section 12(3).)

Other legislation
- Amends: See § Repealed enactments
- Repeals/revokes: See § Repealed enactments
- Amended by: Law of Property Act 1925; Settled Land Act 1925; Trustee Act 1925; Land Charges Act 1925; Administration of Estates Act 1925; Land Registration Act 1925; Universities and College Estates Act 1925; Statute Law Revision Act 1950; Statute Law (Repeals) Act 1969; Housing (Consequential Provisions) Act 1985
- Relates to: Law of Property Act 1922; Law of Property Act (Postponement) Act 1924; Housing Act 1925; Housing (Scotland) Act 1925; Town Planning Act 1925; Town Planning (Scotland) Act 1925; Settled Land Act 1925; Trustee Act 1925; Law of Property Act 1925; Land Registration Act 1925; Land Charges Act 1925; Administration of Estates Act 1925; Universities and College Estates Act 1925; Supreme Court of Judicature (Consolidation) Act 1925; Workmen's Compensation Act 1925

Status: Partially repealed

Text of statute as originally enacted

Revised text of statute as amended

Text of the Law of Property (Amendment) Act 1924 as in force today (including any amendments) within the United Kingdom, from legislation.gov.uk.

The Law of Property (Amendment) Act 1924 (15 & 16 Geo. 5. c. 5) is an act of the Parliament of the United Kingdom that amended the Law of Property Act 1922 (12 & 13 Geo. 5. c. 16) and facilitated the consolidation of the law relating to conveyancing and property, settled land, trustees, the registration of land charges, the administration of estates, and the registration of title to land in England and Wales.

== Provisions ==
=== Repealed enactments ===
Section 1 of the act declared that 24 enactments, listed in the first schedule to the act, were the enactments repealed by the Law of Property Act 1922 (12 & 13 Geo. 5. c. 16).

| Citation | Short title | Description | Extent of repeal |
|---|---|---|---|
| 27 Hen. 8. c. 10 | Statute of Uses Act 1535 | Statute of Uses | The whole act. |
| 22 & 23 Car. 2. c. 10 | Statute of Distribution | The Statute of Distribution | Sections three and four. |
| 29 Car. 2. c. 3 | Statute of Frauds | Statute of Frauds | Section twenty-four. |
| 1 Jac. 2. c. 17 | Administration of Intestates' Estate Act 1685 | An Act for reviving and continuance of severall Acts of Parlyament therein mentioned | Sections five and seven. |
| 11 Geo. 4. & 1 Will. 4. c. 40 | Executors Act 1830 | The Executors Act, 1830 | The whole act. |
| 3 & 4 Will. 4. c. 74 | Fines and Recoveries Act 1833 | The Fines and Recoveries Act, 1833 | Section thirty-two, as respects settlements made or coming into operation after the commencement of the principal Act. |
| 17 & 18 Vict. c. 97 | Inclosure Act 1854 | The Inclosure Act, 1854 | The proviso to section eleven, and, in section thirteen, the words "so far as the same has been apportioned upon the lands of persons interested and making applications as aforesaid." |
| 31 & 32 Vict. c. 40 | Partition Act 1868 | The Partition Act, 1868 | The whole act without prejudice to proceedings commenced thereunder before the commencement of the principal Act. |
| 34 & 35 Vict. c. 31 | Trade Union Act 1871 | The Trade Union Act, 1871. | In section seven, the words "not exceeding one acre." |
| 37 & 38 Vict. c. 78 | Vendor and Purchaser Act 1874 | The Vendor and Purchaser Act, 1874 | Section one. |
| 38 & 39 Vict. c. 87 | Land Transfer Act 1875 | The Land Transfer Act, 1875 | Section two; in section four from "The Court of Chancery" to the end of the section; in sub-section (1) of section eleven the words "for a life or lives" or determinable on a life "or lives"; sections twelve, fourteen, fifteen, and sixteen; in paragraph (2) of section eighteen, the words "succession duty," paragraphs (4) and (5), in paragraph (7) the words "in cases where there is an occupation under such tenancies," and the words from "The Commissioners of Inland Revenue" to the end of the section; in section thirty-four from the words "upon completion of the registration" to the end of the section; sections thirty-six, thirty-seven, forty-one, forty-four, forty-five, and forty-nine; in section fifty, from the words "is for a life" to the end of the section; section fifty-two; the proviso to section fifty-three; sections sixty-eight and sixty-nine; in section seventy the words "the vendor or his solicitor in cases where the applicant is a person who has contracted to buy such land, and in all other cases"; paragraphs (3), (4), (7), and (8) of section eighty-three; section eighty-four; in section eighty-five, the words from "but this enactment" to the end of the section; sections eighty-seven and eighty-eight; in sections ninety-five and ninety-six the words "subject to any estates or rights acquired by registration in pursuance of this Act"; and subsection (4) of section one hundred and eleven. |
| 39 & 40 Vict. c. 17 | Partition Act 1876 | The Partition Act, 1876 | The whole act, without prejudice to proceedings commenced thereunder before the commencement of the principal Act. |
| 40 & 41 Vict. c. 18 | Settled Estates Act 1877 | The Settled Estates Act, 1877 | The whole act. |
| 44 & 45 Vict. c. 41 | Conveyancing Act 1881 | The Conveyancing Act, 1881. | Section twelve; in paragraph (f) of subsection (6) of section fourteen, the words "To a covenant or condition against assigning, under-letting, parting with the possession, or disposing of the land leased; or" except in the application of that paragraph to breaches occurring before the commencement of the principal Act, and to cases where the land leased has been assigned, underlet, parted with or disposed of, to a limited company either before or after the commencement; in subsection (3) of section twenty-three the words "affected under the mortgage deed or under this Act"; section thirty as respects deaths occurring after the commencement of the principal Act; section forty-one; sub-sections (4) and (5) of section forty-two and section forty-three, as respects instruments coming into operation after the commencement of the principal Act; subsections (4) and (5) of section forty-five; and section sixty-two. |
| 45 & 46 Vict. c. 38 | Settled Land Act 1882 | The Settled Land Act, 1882. | Subsection (4) of section two, and in paragraph (i) of subsection (10) of that section, the words "also an undivided share"; in subsection (6) of section two the words "as tenants in common or" and the words "or for other concurrent estate or interests"; subsection (6) of section four; sections fourteen and nineteen; subsection (3) of section twenty; subsections (1) (2) and (3) of section twenty-four, and in subsection (4), the words "as aforesaid," "in respect of money actually raised and remaining unpaid," "or any undivided share therein," and "or partition"; in subsection (5), the words "or partition" in both places where those words occur, and the words "or an undivided share wherein"; section twenty-six; subsection (1) of section thirty-seven; in subsection (1) of section thirty-nine, the words "settlement authorises the receipt of capital trust money of the settlement by one trustee"; in subsection (2) of section forty-five, the words "a contrary intention is expressed in the settlement"; paragraph (ii) of subsection (1) of section fifty-eight; section sixty from "and if there are none" to the end of the section, and section sixty-three. |
| 47 & 48 Vict. c. 18 | Settled Land Act 1884 | The Settled Land Act, 1884 | Sections six and seven. |
| 51 & 52 Vict. c. 51 | Land Charges Registration and Searches Act 1888 | The Land Charges Registration and Searches Act, 1888 | In section four the words "does not include an order made by a court having jurisdiction in bankruptcy." |
| 52 & 53 Vict. c. 36 | Settled Land Act 1889 | The Settled Land Act, 1889. | The whole act. |
| 53 & 54 Vict. c. 29 | Intestates' Estates Act 1890 | The Intestates' Estates Act, 1890 | The whole act. |
| 53 & 54 Vict. c. 69 | Settled Land Act 1890 | The Settled Land Act, 1890 | In section nine the words "for building purposes and from" and "the rentcharge" to the end of the section; and sections twelve and nineteen. |
| 56 & 57 Vict. c. 53 | Trustee Act 1893 | The Trustee Act, 1893. | In paragraph (c) of subsection (2) of section ten, the words "at least two trustees to perform the trust"; in subsection (1) of section eleven, the words "where there are more than two trustees if one of them"; and in proviso (e) to subsection (1) of section thirty-five, the words "by the court." |
| 57 & 58 Vict. c. 46 | Copyhold Act 1894 | The Copyhold Act, 1894 | The definition of "tenant" in section ninety-four. |
| 60 & 61 Vict. c. 65 | Land Transfer Act 1897 | The Land Transfer Act, 1897 | Part I., as respects deaths occurring after the commencement of the principal Act; subsections (1), (3), (4), (5), (8) and (10) of section six; subsections (1) to (4) of section seven, and the words "act, neglect or default" in subsection (6) of that section; subsection (3) of section eight; in subsection (4) of the same section the words "subject to any stipulation to the contrary, the proprietor of a registered charge shall not be entitled to have the custody of the land certificate, or to require a land certificate to be applied for"; sections twelve and thirteen; subsection (2) of section fourteen; subsections (1) and (3) of section sixteen; in subsection (1) of section twenty, from "a person shall not" to end of that subsection; subsection (8) of section twenty; in subsection (3) of section twenty-three, the words "but no sum" to "such transfer"; in subsection (1) of section twenty-four the words "or two lives yet to fall in or to an undivided share in land"; and subsection (2) of that section. |
| 1 & 2 Geo. 5. c. 37 | Conveyancing Act 1911 | The Conveyancing Act, 1911 | Section twelve as respects deaths occurring after the commencement of the principal Act. |

== Subsequent developments ==
The act was substantially repealed by the Law of Property Act 1925 (15 & 16 Geo. 5. c. 20), the Settled Land Act 1925 (15 & 16 Geo. 5. c. 18), the Trustee Act 1925 (15 & 16 Geo. 5. c. 19), the Land Charges Act 1925 (15 & 16 Geo. 5. c. 22), the Administration of Estates Act 1925 (15 & 16 Geo. 5. c. 23), the Land Registration Act 1925 (15 & 16 Geo. 5. c. 21), and the Universities and College Estates Act 1925 (15 & 16 Geo. 5. c. 24), all of which came into force on 1 January 1926.

Section 1, section 10, subsection 12(3), and the first and tenth schedules were subsequently repealed by the Statute Law Revision Act 1950 (14 Geo. 6. c. 6).
