= Administration of Estates Act 1925 =

Act of the Parliament of the United Kingdom

Administration of Estates Act 1925 (Note: Section 58(1).)
- Act of Parliament
- Parliament of the United Kingdom
- Long title: An Act to consolidate Enactments relating to the Administration of the Estates of Deceased Persons
- Citation: 15 & 16 Geo. 5. c. 23
- Territorial extent: England and Wales (Note: Section 58(3).)

Dates
- Royal assent: 9 April 1925
- Commencement: 1 January 1926 (Note: Section 58(2).)
Other legislation
Amends	See § Repealed enactments
Repeals/revokes	See § Repealed enactments
Amended by	Supreme Court of Judicature (Consolidation) Act 1925; Law Reform (Miscellaneous Provisions) Act 1934; Limitation Act 1939; Statute Law Revision Act 1948; Statute Law Revision Act 1950; Mental Health Act 1959; Family Provision Act 1966; Family Law Reform Act 1969; Courts Act 1971; Administration of Estates Act 1971; Consumer Credit Act 1974; Administration of Justice Act 1977; Statute Law (Repeals) Act 1981; Senior Courts Act 1981; Family Law Reform Act 1987; Law of Property (Miscellaneous Provisions) Act 1994; Law Reform (Succession) Act 1995; Trusts of Land and Appointment of Trustees Act 1996; Land Registration Act 2002; Mental Capacity Act 2005
Relates to	Housing Act 1925; Housing (Scotland) Act 1925; Town Planning Act 1925; Town Planning (Scotland) Act 1925; Settled Land Act 1925; Trustee Act 1925; Law of Property Act 1925; Land Registration Act 1925; Land Charges Act 1925; Universities and College Estates Act 1925; Supreme Court of Judicature (Consolidation) Act 1925; Workmen's Compensation Act 1925

Status: Amended

Text of statute as originally enacted

Revised text of statute as amended

Text of the Administration of Estates Act 1925 as in force today (including any amendments) within the United Kingdom, from legislation.gov.uk.

The Administration of Estates Act 1925 (15 & 16 Geo. 5. c. 23) is an act of the Parliament of the United Kingdom that consolidated, reformed, and simplified the rules relating to the administration of estates in England and Wales.

== Principal reforms ==
Section 2 of the act extended all authority that a personal representative had with respect to chattels real (such as fixtures) to cover any matter dealing with real estate.

Section 45 of the act abolished the following, respect to the property of any estate (excepting entailed interests):

- all existing rules of descent (whether arising from the common law, custom, gavelkind, Borough English or otherwise)
- tenancy by the curtesy and any other estate a husband may have where his wife dies intestate
- dower, freebench and any other estate a wife may have where her husband dies intestate
- escheat to the Crown, the Duchy of Lancaster, the Duchy of Cornwall, or to a mesne lord

Section 46 of the act replaced the rules governing the distribution of intestate estates with a single statutory framework.

=== Repealed enactments ===
Section 56 of the act repealed 47 enactments, listed in the second schedule to the act. However, repeals listed in part I of the second schedule would not affect cases where the death occurred before the commencement of the act, whereas the repeals listed in part II would apply generally.

Repeals not affecting Cases where the Death occurred before the commencement of this act
Citation	Short title	Description	Extent of repeal
13 Edw. 1. (Stat. Westm. sec.) c. 19	Administration of Estates Act 1285	The ordinary chargeable to pay the debts of an intestate.	The whole chapter.
13 Edw. 1. (Stat. Westm. sec.) c. 23	Executors; writ of accompt	Writ of accompt for executors	The whole chapter.
13 Edw. 1. (Stat. Westm. sec.) c. 34	Forfeiture of Dower, etc. Act 1285	Dower forfeited by elopement with adulterer.	From " and if a wife willingly leave her husband " to " in which case she shall be re-stored to her action."
25 Edw. 1. c. 7	Dower Act 1297	Widow; her marriage estate; quarantine; estovers; dower; remarriage.	The whole chapter.
25 Edw. 1. c. 18	Crown debt	The King's tenant, his debtor	From " and the residue" to "reasonable parts."
Statute (temp, incert.)	Statutum de Tenentibus per legem Anglie	Statute concerning tenants by the Curtesy of England.	The whole statute.
Statute Prerogativa Regis (temp, incert.) c. 18	Crown Forfeitures Act 1324	Customs of Gloucester and Kent.	From "Nevertheless it is used " to the end of the chapter.
4 Edw. 3. c. 7	Executors' action for trespass	Executors shall have an action of trespass for a wrong done to their testator.	The whole chapter.
25 Edw. 3. st. 5. c. 5	Executors of executors	Executors of executors shall have the same rights and duties as the first executors.	The whole chapter.
31 Edw. 3. st. 1. c. 11	Administration of Estates Act 1357	The ordinary shall commit administration upon an intestacy. The administrators shall have the same rights and charges as executors.	The whole chapter.
21 Hen. 8. c. 4	Executors Act 1529	An Acte cononinge Executors of Laste Willes and Testamente	The whole act.
21 Hen. 8. c. 5	Probate Fees, Inventories, etc. Act 1529	An Acte concninge Fynes & somes of Moneye to be taken by the Ministers of Busshops and other Ordinaries of Holye Churche for the pbate of Testamte.	The whole act.
32 Hen. 8. c. 37	Cestui que vie Act 1540	For recoving of Arrerage by Executes and Adnunistrators.	Sections one, two and three.
1 Edw. 6. c. 12	Treason Act 1547	An Acte for the repeale of certaine statutes concerninge treasons, felonyes, &c.	Section sixteen.
5 & 6 Edw. 6. c. 11	Treason Act 1551	An Acte for the punyshment of divse treasons.	Section eleven.
5 & 6 Edw. 6. c. 12	Clergy Marriage Act 1551	An Acte for the declaracon of a statute made for the marriage of Priests and for the legitti-macon of their children.	Section two.
43 Eliz. c. 8	Fraudulent Administration of Intestates' Goods Act 1601	An Acte against fraudulent ad-ministracon of intestates goodes.	The whole act.
12 Chas. 2. c. 24	Tenures Abolition Act 1660	An Acte taking away the Court of Wards and Liveries and Tenures in Capite and by Knights Service and Purveyance and for settling a Revenue upon His Majesty in Lieu thereof.	Section seven from "tenures in franke almoigne " to " nor to take away."
22 & 23 Chas. 2. c. 10	Statute of Distribution	The Statute of Distribution	The whole act.
29 Chas. 2. c. 3	Statute of Frauds	The Statute of Frauds	Sections ten, eleven, twenty, three, twenty-four, so far as unrepealed.
30 Chas. 2. c. 7	Executors of Executors (Waste) Act 1678	An Act to enable creditors to recover their debts of the executors and administrators of executors in their own wrong.	The whole act.
1 Jas. 2. c. 17	Administration of Intestates' Estate Act 1685	An Act for reviveing and continuance of severall Acts of Parlyament therein mentioned.	The whole act.
4 Will. & Mar. c. 24	Estreats (Personal Representatives) Act 1692	An Act for reviving, continuing and explaining several laws therein mentioned that are expired and neare expiring.	Section twelve.
38 Geo. 3. c. 87	Administration of Estates Act 1798	The Administration of Estates Act, 1798.	The whole act.
11 Geo. 4 & 1 Will. 4. c. 40	Executors Act 1830	The Executors Act, 1830	The whole act.
11 Geo. 4. & 1 Will. 4. c. 47	Debts Recovery Act 1830	The Debts Recovery Act, 1830	The whole act.
3 & 4 Will. 4. c. 27	Real Property Limitation Act 1833	The Real Property Limitation Act, 1833.	Section forty-one.
3 & 4 Will. 4. c. 42	Civil Procedure Act 1833	The Civil Procedure Act, 1833	Sections two, thirty-seven and thirty-eight.
3 & 4 Will. 4. c. 74	Fines and Recoveries Act 1833	The Fines and Recoveries Act, 1833.	In section twenty-seven the words " no woman in respect of her dower and "
3 & 4 Will. 4. c. 104	Administration of Estates Act 1833	The Administration of Estates Act, 1833.	The whole act.
3 & 4 Will. 4. c. 105	Dower Act 1833	The Dower Act, 1833	The whole act.
2 & 3 Vict. c. 60	Debts Recovery Act 1839	The Debts Recovery Act, 1839	The whole act.
11 & 12 Vict. c. 87	Debts Recovery Act 1848	The Debts Recovery Act, 1848	The whole act.
17 & 18 Vict. c. 113	Real Estate Charges Act 1854	The Real Estate Charges Act, 1854.	The whole act.
20 & 21 Vict. c. 77	Court of Probate Act 1857	The Court of Probate Act, 1857.	Sections seventy to eighty.
21 & 22 Vict. c. 95	Court of Probate Act 1858	The Court of Probate Act, 1858	Sections sixteen, eighteen, nineteen, twenty-one, and twenty-two.
22 & 23 Vict. c. 35	Law of Property Amendment Act 1859	The Law of Property Amendment Act, 1859.	Sections fourteen to eighteen.
30 & 31 Vict. c. 69	Real Estate Charges Act 1867	The Real Estate Charges Act, 1867.	The whole act.
32 & 33 Vict. c. 46	Administration of Estates Act 1869	The Administration of Estates Act, 1869.	The whole act.
38 & 39 Vict. c. 77	Supreme Court of Judicature Act 1875	The Supreme Court of Judicature Act, 1875.	Section ten.
40 & 41 Vict. c. 34	Real Estate Charges Act 1877	The Real Estate Charges Act, 1877.	The whole act.
47 & 48 Vict. c. 71	Intestates Estates Act 1884	The Intestates Estates Act, 1884	The whole act.
53 & 54 Vict. c. 29	Intestates' Estates Act 1890	The Intestates Estates Act, 1890.	The whole act.
4 & 5 Geo. 5. c. 59	Bankruptcy Act 1914	The Bankruptcy Act, 1914	Section one hundred and thirty.

Repeals applying where the Death occurred before or after the commencement of this act
Citation	Short title	Description	Extent of repeal
10 & 11 Geo. 5. c. 81	Administration of Justice Act 1920	The Administration of Justice Act, 1920.	Section seventeen.
12 & 13 Geo. 5. c. 16	Law of Property Act 1922	The Law of Property Act, 1922.	Subsection (7) of section one hundred and ten ; Part VIII. except section one hundred and fifty, two; and Part IX. except subsection (13) of section one hundred and fifty-six; and sub - paragraphs (2) and (3) of paragraph five of the Sixth Schedule.
15 & 16 Geo. 5. c. 5 (Note: Incorrectly cited as "15 Geo. 5. c. 5".)	Law of Property (Amendment) Act 1924	The Law of Property (Amendment) Act, 1924.	Section seven and the Seventh Schedule.

=== Short title, commencement and extent ===
Section 58(1) of the act provided that the act may be cited as the "Administration of Estates Act, 1925".

Section 58(2) of the act provided that the act would come into force on 1 January 1926.

Section 58(3) of the act provided that the act extended to England and Wales only.

== Later significant amendments ==
The act has been subsequently amended in certain respects by the following:

- Intestates' Estates Act 1952 (15 & 16 Geo. 6 & 1 Eliz. 2. c. 64)
- Inheritance (Provision for Family and Dependants) Act 1975 (c. 63)
- Estates of Deceased Persons (Forfeiture Rule and Law of Succession) Act 2011 (c. 7)
- Inheritance and Trustees' Powers Act 2014 (c. 16)

== In fiction ==
The act plays a major role (as the 'Property Act') in the 1927 mystery novel Unnatural Death by Dorothy L. Sayers, its commencement with respect to intestate estates providing the motive for a seemingly motiveless murder which Lord Peter Wimsey must solve.

== See also ==
- Administration of an estate on death
- Ultimogeniture
