= Land Transfer Act 1875 =

Act of the Parliament of the United Kingdom

Land Transfer Act 1875 (Note: Section 1.)
- Act of Parliament
- Parliament of the United Kingdom
- Long title: An Act to simplify Titles and facilitate the Transfer of Land in England.
- Citation: 38 & 39 Vict. c. 87
- Territorial extent: England and Wales (Note: Section 2.)

Dates
- Royal assent: 13 August 1875
- Commencement: 1 January 1876
- Repealed: 1 January 1926
Other legislation
Amends	Vendor and Purchaser Act 1874
Amended by	Land Transfer Act 1897; Perjury Act 1911; Law of Property Act 1922; Law of Property (Amendment) Act 1924
Repealed by	Land Registration Act 1925
Relates to	Trustee Act 1850; Land Registration Act 2002

Status: Repealed

Text of statute as originally enacted

The Land Transfer Act 1875 (38 & 39 Vict. c. 87), sometimes called Lord Cairns' Act, was an act of the Parliament of the United Kingdom intended to simplify titles and to facilitate the transfer of land in England and Wales. It introduced a voluntary system for the registration of title to land.

The act apparently aimed to introduce the Australian model of title registration. But land registration remained as voluntary, and the options were not taken up.

== Background ==
Efforts to establish a land registration system in England and Wales began with the Land Registry Act 1862 (25 & 26 Vict. c. 53), which created a register of title but proved administratively complex and unpopular. The 1862 act was largely a failure, and by the 1870s few titles had been entered in the register. The 1875 legislation was drafted under Lord Cairns, the lord chancellor, to create a more workable framework.

== Provisions ==
The act applied only to England and Wales (section 2) and provided for two forms of registration: absolute and possessory title. An "absolute" title was guaranteed by the state, while a "possessory" title merely recorded possession pending proof of ownership. Registration under the act was entirely voluntary, and the process was managed by the Office of Land Registry.

== Uptake and impact ==
Although the act was intended to modernise conveyancing, it saw very limited use. After three years, only forty-seven titles had been registered under the act. The system’s voluntary nature and its perceived complexity discouraged landowners from registering their titles. Subsequent reforms, notably the Land Transfer Act 1897 (60 & 61 Vict. c. 65), introduced compulsory registration in certain areas of London, laying the foundation for broader land registration in the twentieth century.

== Repeal and legacy ==
The whole act was repealed by section 147(1) of, and the schedule to, the Land Registration Act 1925 (15 & 16 Geo. 5. c. 21), which came into force on 1 January 1926. The 1926 act created a comprehensive and modern system of title registration. The current framework of land registration in England and Wales, now governed by the Land Registration Act 2002, traces its origins to the principles first established by the 1875 act.

== See also ==
- Land Registry Act 1862
- Land Transfer Act 1897
- Land Registration Act 1925
- Land Registration Act 2002
- English land law
