= Real Property Act 1845 =

Act of the Parliament of the United Kingdom

Real Property Act 1845 (Note: The citation of this act by this short title was authorised by section 1 of, and the first schedule to, the Short Titles Act 1896. Due to the repeal of those provisions it is now authorised by section 19(2) of the Interpretation Act 1978.)
- Act of Parliament
- Parliament of the United Kingdom
- Long title: An Act to amend the Law of Real property.
- Citation: 8 & 9 Vict. c. 106
- Territorial extent: England and Wales; Scotland; (Note: Section 10.)

Dates
- Royal assent: 4 August 1845
- Commencement: 1 October 1845 (Note: Section 1.)
- Repealed: 1 January 1926
Other legislation
Repeals/revokes	Transfer of Property Act 1844
Amended by	Landlord and Tenant Law Amendment (Ireland) Act 1860
Repealed by	Statute Law Revision Act 1875; Law of Property (Amendment) Act 1924; Law of Property Act 1925
Relates to	Conveyance of Real Property Act 1845

Status: Repealed

Text of statute as originally enacted

The Real Property Act 1845 (8 & 9 Vict. c. 106) was an act of the Parliament of the United Kingdom, which regulated the transfer of land by sale.

== Provisions ==
Section 3 of the act stated that "a lease required by law to be in writing ... shall be void at law unless also made by deed".

Section 5 reversed a common law rule that a person could not take an immediate interest in land unless named in an indenture under seal.

Section 6 stated that contingent interests were entirely alienable.

== Conveyance of Real Property Act 1845 ==
Conveyance of Real Property Act 1845
- Act of Parliament
- Parliament of the United Kingdom
- Long title: An Act to facilitate the Conveyance of Real Property.
- Citation: 8 & 9 Vict. c. 119
- Territorial extent: England and Wales; Scotland; (Note: Section 9.)

Dates
- Royal assent: 8 August 1845
- Commencement: 1 October 1845 (Note: Section 8.)
- Repealed: 1 January 1882
Other legislation
Repealed by	Conveyancing Act 1881
Relates to	Real Property Act 1845

Status: Repealed

Text of statute as originally enacted

The act 8 & 9 Vict. c. 119, sometimes called the Conveyance of Real Property Act 1845, was an act of the Parliament of the United Kingdom.

== Subsequent developments ==
Section 3 of the act, "save so far as same relates to Feoffments, Partitions, and Exchanges, repealed by section 104 of, and schedule (B.) to, the Landlord and Tenant Law Amendment (Ireland) Act 1860 (23 & 24 Vict. c. 154), which came into force on 1 January 1861..

Section 1 of the act was repealed by section 1 of, and the schedule to, the Statute Law Revision Act 1875 (38 & 39 Vict. c. 66), which came into force on 11 August 1875.

Section 8 of the act was repealed for England and Wales by section 10 of, and the tenth schedule to, the Law of Property (Amendment) Act 1924 (15 & 16 Geo. 5. c. 5), which came into force on 1 January 1926.

Sections 2–7 and 9 of the act were repealed for England and Wales by section 207 of, and the seventh schedule to, the Law of Property Act 1925 (15 & 16 Geo. 5. c. 20), which came into force on 1 January 1926.

== See also ==
- English land law
