= Town and Country Planning Act 1947 =

Act of the Parliament of the United Kingdom

Town and Country Planning Act 1947 (Note: Section 120(1).)
- Act of Parliament
- Parliament of the United Kingdom
- Long title: An Act to make fresh provision for planning the development and use of land, for the grant of permission to develop land and for other powers of control over the use of land; to confer on public authorities additional powers in respect of the acquisition and development of land for planning and other purposes, and to amend the law relating to compensation in respect of the compulsory acquisition of land; to provide for payments out of central funds in respect of depreciation occasioned by planning restrictions; to secure the recovery for the benefit of the community of development charges in respect of certain new development; to provide for the payment of grants out of central funds in respect of expenses of local authorities in connection with the matters aforesaid; and for purposes connected with the matters aforesaid.
- Citation: 10 & 11 Geo. 6 c. 51
- Territorial extent: England and Wales (Note: Section 120(3)–(4).)

Dates
- Royal assent: 6 August 1947
- Commencement: 1 July 1948 (Note: Section 120(2). The Town and Country Planning Act 1947 (Appointed Day) Order 1948 (SI 1948/213).)
- Repealed: 24 August 1990
Other legislation
Amends	See § Repealed enactments
Repeals/revokes	See § Repealed enactments
Amended by	Civil Aviation Act 1949; Town and Country Planning (Amendment) Act 1951; Income Tax Act 1952; Town and Country Planning Act 1953; Licensing Act 1953; Highways Act 1959; Local Employment Act 1960; Land Compensation Act 1961; Town and Country Planning Act 1962; Betting, Gaming and Lotteries Act 1963; New Towns Act 1965; Town and Country Planning Act 1971; Statute Law (Repeals) Act 1975; Acquisition of Land Act 1981; Building Act 1984; Statute Law (Repeals) Act 1989
Repealed by	Planning (Consequential Provisions) Act 1990
Relates to	Town and Country Planning (Scotland) Act 1947

Status: Repealed

Text of statute as originally enacted

The Town and Country Planning Act 1947 (10 & 11 Geo. 6. c. 51) was an act of the Parliament of the United Kingdom passed by the Labour government led by Clement Attlee. The act came into effect on 1 July 1948.

The Town and Country Planning (Scotland) Act 1947 (10 & 11 Geo. 6. c. 53) made corresponding provisions for Scotland. Together, the acts formed the foundation of modern town and country planning in the United Kingdom.

Today the main statutes in England and Wales are the Town and Country Planning Act 1990 and the Planning and Compulsory Purchase Act 2004, supported by the National Planning Policy Framework (NPPF) introduced in 2012. In Scotland the main statute is the Town and Country Planning (Scotland) Act 1997 and the Planning etc. (Scotland) Act 2006, supported by the National Policy Framework. In Northern Ireland it is the Planning Act (Northern Ireland) 2011.

== Provisions ==
The act established that planning permission was required for land development; ownership alone no longer conferred the right to develop the land. To control this, the act reorganised the planning system from the 1,400 existing planning authorities to 145 (formed from county councils and the councils of county boroughs), and required them all to prepare a comprehensive development plan.

These local authorities were given wide-ranging powers in addition to approval of planning proposals; they could carry out redevelopment of land themselves, or use compulsory purchase orders to buy land and lease it to private developers. They were also given powers to control outdoor advertising, and to preserve woodland or buildings of architectural or historic interest – the latter the beginning of the modern listed building system.

The act provided that all development values were vested in the state, with £300 million set aside for compensation of landowners. Any land would be purchased by a developer at its existing-use value; after permission to develop was granted, the developer would be assessed a "development charge" based on the difference between the initial price and the final value of the land. This charge was not payable in all cases – for example, cottages for agricultural workers, or limited enlargements to houses, were exempt. These charges were theoretically assessed by the Central Land Board, but it was intended that local district valuers would work with developers to agree a fair value; it was reported in 1949 that "where [a charge] is payable, the amount has been agreed by the developer in over 95 per cent of the cases". Where the landowner refused to sell land at the "undeveloped" price, the Central Land Board had authority to purchase it compulsorily and resell it to the developer.

In order to assist local authorities to carry out major redevelopment, the act provided for extensive government grants. The Treasury would pay 50% to 80% of the annual expenditure for the first five years, depending on the financial situation of the authority; in exceptional cases, this could be increased to eight years. In areas of significant war damage, the rate was set at 90% of expenditure. After this initial period grants would continue, at a lower rate (50% in war-damaged areas, variable for others), for sixty years. Local authorities were given the power to raise loans to pay for this redevelopment, repayable over the same sixty-year period. Grants of 20–50% were available for related expenditure, such as the cost of acquiring land outside the main redevelopment areas.

=== Repealed enactments ===
Section 113(2) of the act repealed 32 enactments, listed in parts I and II of the ninth schedule to the act.

Part I - as from the passing of the act
Citation	Short title	Extent of repeal
7 & 8 Geo. 6. c. 47	Town and Country Planning Act 1944	In section twenty-four, in subsection (2) the words from "and section fifty-seven" to the end of the subsection; in section twenty-six, in paragraph (b) of subsection (2) the words from "including" to the end of the paragraph; sections fifty-seven to sixty-two; in section sixty-four, the words "except in so far as is otherwise provided by this Act"; in the Sixth Schedule, in sub-paragraph (4) of paragraph 1 the words "and as amended by Part II of this Act", and in sub-paragraph (1) of paragraph 5 the words "or the amount of any sum payable as a supplement thereto" and the words "together, if any sum is payable as a supplement thereto, with the amount of that sum"; and the Seventh and Eighth Schedules.
8 & 9 Geo. 6. c. 43	Requisitioned Land and War Works Act 1945	In section forty-one, subsection (7) and paragraph (c) of subsection (8).
9 & 10 Geo. 6. c. 70	Civil Aviation Act 1946	In the Third Schedule, paragraph 10; in the Fourth Schedule, paragraphs 4 and 5 and paragraph (b) of the proviso to paragraph 6; and in the Sixth Schedule, paragraphs 2 and 3 and paragraph (b) of the proviso to paragraph 4.
9 & 10 Geo. 6. c. 68	New Towns Act 1946	In section four, in subsection (7) the words from "and that Part II" to the end of the subsection.

Part II - as from the appointed day
Citation	Short title	Extent of repeal
52 & 53 Vict. c. 27	Advertising Stations (Rating) Act 1889	Section five.
7 Edw. 7. c. 27	Advertisements Regulation Act 1907	The whole act.
7 Edw. 7. c. 53	Public Health Acts Amendment Act 1907	Section ninety-one.
15 & 16 Geo. 5. c. 52	Advertisements Regulation Act 1925	The whole act.
15 & 16 Geo. 5. c. 68	Roads Improvement Act 1925	In section five, the proviso to subsection (7).
16 & 17 Geo. 5. c. 11	Law of Property (Amendment) Act 1926	In the Schedule, in the subsection substituted for subsection (7) of section fifteen of the Land Charges Act 1925, paragraph (a), sub-paragraph (ii) of paragraph (b) and the word "scheme" where that word last occurs.
18 & 19 Geo. 5. c. 32	Petroleum (Consolidation) Act 1928	Section eleven.
21 & 22 Geo. 5. c. 16	Ancient Monuments Act 1931	Section two.
22 & 23 Geo. 5. c. 48	Town and Country Planning Act 1932	The whole act.
23 & 24 Geo. 5. c. 51	Local Government Act 1933	In the Seventh Schedule, the words "The Town and Country Planning Act, 1932."
25 & 26 Geo. 5. c. 47	Restriction of Ribbon Development Act 1935	Sections one to three; sections five to twelve; in paragraph (2) of subsection (3) of section thirteen the words from "or which is for the time being" to the end of that paragraph; section fifteen; the proviso to subsection (1) and subsection (2) of section eighteen; subsections (2), (3) and (4) of section nineteen; subsection (1) of section twenty-three; subsection (2) of section twenty-four except the definitions of "building", "chief officer of police", "land", "middle of the road", "Minister", "owner", "place of public resort", "proposed road", "road" and "statutory undertakers", and subsection (2) of that section; and the First, Second and Third Schedules.
26 Geo. 5 & 1 Edw. 8. c. 49	Public Health Act 1936	In section one hundred and seven, in subsection (1) the words "but not for the purposes of any planning scheme in operation on the said date"; and in section three hundred and forty-three, in subsection (1) the definition of "planning scheme".
26 Geo. 5 & 1 Edw. 8. c. 51	Housing Act 1936	In section sixteen, in subsection (4) the words "and of any planning scheme in operation in the area." In section one hundred and eighty-eight, in subsection (1) the definition of "planning scheme."
1 Edw. 8 & 1 Geo. 6. c. 5	Trunk Roads Act 1936	Subsections (2) to (5) of section four, and in the Fourth Schedule, paragraphs 1 to 4 and in paragraph 5 the words from "subject to restrictions in force" to the words "expenses incurred in so doing" and the proviso to that paragraph.
2 & 3 Geo. 6. c. 22	Camps Act 1939	Subsection (2) of section three.
2 & 3 Geo. 6. c. 31	Civil Defence Act 1939	Section seventy.
2 & 3 Geo. 6. c. 40	London Government Act 1939	In the Fifth Schedule, the words "The Town and Country Planning Act, 1932."
6 & 7 Geo. 6. c. 5	Minister of Town and Country Planning Act 1943	Subsection (1) of section six and the First Schedule.
6 & 7 Geo. 6. c. 29	Town and Country Planning (Interim Development) Act 1943	The whole act.
6 & 7 Geo. 6. c. 34	Restriction of Ribbon Development (Temporary Development) Act 1943	The whole act.
7 & 8 Geo. 6. c. 47	Town and Country Planning Act 1944	Sections one to fourteen, sections sixteen to eighteen, subsection (3) of section twenty, section twenty-one, sections thirty-one to forty-six, sections fifty to fifty-six, in subsection (1) of section sixty-five the definitions of "clearing", "ecclesiastical property", "first local advertisement", "interim development application", "interim development authority", "loan charges", "local highway authority", "local planning authority", "planning scheme", "purchase order providing for expedited completion", "Valuation Office" and "war damage"; sub-paragraphs (1)(a), (1)(b) and (1)(d) of paragraph 1, and the word "or" at the end of sub-paragraph (a) and sub-paragraph (b) of paragraph 3 of the First Schedule, the Second and Third Schedules, paragraphs 1 to 8 and 10 of the Fifth Schedule, and paragraph 12 of the Sixth Schedule.
8 & 9 Geo. 6. c. 15	Licensing Planning (Temporary Provisions) Act 1945	Subsection (5) of section ten and subsections (2) and (3) of section thirteen.
8 & 9 Geo. 6. c. 36	Distribution of Industry Act 1945	Sections six, nine and ten.
9 & 10 Geo. 6. c. 18	Statutory Orders (Special Procedure) Act 1945	In section eight, in subsection (2), paragraph (a) and the words from "requirements imposed" to the words "by order, and the". In the Second Schedule, in the amendments of the Town and Country Planning Act 1944, the words "subsections (4) and (5) of section thirteen," "subsections (1) and (2) of section fourteen," "subsection (3) of section thirty-five," and "paragraphs (d) and (e) of subsection (1) of section thirty-six,"; and the words from "section sixteen" to "were omitted".
9 & 10 Geo. 6. c. 30	Trunk Roads Act 1946	In section three, the proviso to subsection (2) and subsection (3); in section four, in subsection (2) the words from "and without prejudice" to the end of the subsection; in section eight, subsection (5); in section twelve, subsection (2); and in the Third Schedule, in the amendment of section four of the Trunk Roads Act 1936, the words from the beginning to "as the case may be".
9 & 10 Geo. 6. c. 35	Building Restrictions (War-Time Contraventions) Act 1946	Subsection (2) of section four.
9 & 10 Geo. 6. c. 49	Acquisition of Land (Authorisation Procedure) Act 1946	Paragraph (c) of subsection (4) of section one; in section two, in subsection (1) the words "or of the Town and Country Planning Act 1944", and in subsection (4) the words "the Town and Country Planning Act 1944"; in the First Schedule, sub-paragraph (2) of paragraph 15, and in the Second Schedule, in paragraph 9 the words "or in subsection (4) of section eighteen of the Town and Country Planning Act 1944".
9 & 10 Geo. 6. c. 68	New Towns Act 1946	Subsections (3) and (4) of section three and the Third Schedule.

== Amendments ==
The act was amended by the Town and Country Planning Act 1962 (10 & 11 Eliz. 2. c. 38) and the Town and Country Planning Act 1971.

Later revisions of the act were legislated in 1962 and 1971.

The whole act was repealed by section 3(1) of, and part I of schedule 1 to, the Planning (Consequential Provisions) Act 1990, which came into force on 24 August 1990.

The Town and Country Planning Act 1990 is the current legislation in England and Wales, which has been substantially amended and added to, especially in 1991, 2004, 2008 and 2011. Devolution in Scotland has resulted in separate legislation, as has the devolved assembly in Northern Ireland. In 2018 the Welsh assembly consulted on proposed separate Welsh planning legislation.

== See also ==
- English land law

== Bibliography ==
- Facts and Figures for Socialists, 1951. Labour Party Research Department. London. 1950.
