= Town and Country Planning (Scotland) Act 1947 =

Act of the Parliament of the United Kingdom

Town and Country Planning (Scotland) Act 1947 (Note: Section 114(1).)
- Act of Parliament
- Parliament of the United Kingdom
- Long title: An Act to make fresh provision with respect to Scotland for planning the development and use of land, for the grant of permission to develop land and for other powers of control over the use of land; to confer on public authorities additional powers in respect of the acquisition and development of land for planning and other purposes, and to amend the law relating to compensation in respect of the compulsory acquisition of land; to provide for payments out of central funds in respect of depreciation occasioned by planning restrictions; to secure the recovery for the benefit of the community of development charges in respect of certain new development; to provide for the payment of grants out of central funds in respect of expenses of local planning authorities in connection with the matters aforesaid; and for purposes connected with the matters aforesaid.
- Citation: 10 & 11 Geo. 6. c. 53
- Territorial extent: Scotland (Note: Section 114(3).)

Dates
- Royal assent: 13 August 1947
- Commencement: 1 July 1948 (Note: Section 114(2).)
Other legislation
Amends	See § Repealed enactments
Repeals/revokes	See § Repealed enactments
Amended by	Statute Law Revision Act 1948; Civil Aviation Act 1949; Income Tax Act 1952; Town and Country Planning (Amendment) Act 1951; Town and Country Planning Act 1953; Local Employment Act 1960; Betting, Gaming and Lotteries Act 1963; Land Compensation (Scotland) Act 1963; Local Government (Scotland) Act 1966; Countryside (Scotland) Act 1967; National Loans Act 1968; New Towns (Scotland) Act 1968; Statute Law (Repeals) Act 1971; Town and Country Planning (Scotland) Act 1972; Statute Law (Repeals) Act 1974; Statute Law (Repeals) Act 1975; Roads (Scotland) Act 1984; Statute Law (Repeals) Act 1989; Planning (Consequential Provisions) (Scotland) Act 1997
Relates to	Local Government (Scotland) Act 1947; Town and Country Planning Act 1947

Status: Partially repealed

Text of statute as originally enacted

Revised text of statute as amended

Text of the Town and Country Planning (Scotland) Act 1947 as in force today (including any amendments) within the United Kingdom, from legislation.gov.uk.

The Town and Country Planning (Scotland) Act 1947 (10 & 11 Geo. 6. c. 53) is an act of the Parliament of the United Kingdom that made fresh provision relating to planning the development and use of land in Scotland.

The Town and Country Planning Act 1947 (10 & 11 Geo. 6. c. 51) made equivalent provision for England and Wales.

== Provisions ==
=== Repealed enactments ===
Section 109(2) of the act repealed 28 enactments, listed in parts I and II of the ninth schedule to the act, respectively.

Part I - as from the passing of the act
Citation	Short title	Extent of repeal
8 & 9 Geo. 6. c. 33	Town and Country Planning (Scotland) Act 1945	In section twenty-three, in subsection (2) the words from "and section fifty-three" to the end of the subsection; in section twenty-five, in paragraph (b) of subsection (2), the words from "including," to the end of the paragraph; sections fifty-three to fifty-eight; in section sixty-one, the words "except in so far as is otherwise provided by this Act"; in the Sixth Schedule, in sub-paragraph (4) of paragraph 1, the words "(and as amended by Part II of this Act)", and in sub-paragraph (1) of paragraph 5 the words "or the amount of any sum payable as a supplement thereto" and the words "together, if any sum is payable as a supplement thereto, with the amount of that sum"; and the Seventh and Eighth Schedules.
8 & 9 Geo. 6. c. 43	Requisitioned Land and War Works Act 1945	In section forty-one, subsection (7), and paragraph (c) of subsection (8).
9 & 10 Geo. 6. c. 68	New Towns Act 1946	In section four, in subsection (7) the words from "and that Part II" to the end of the subsection, and in section twenty-five, paragraph (d) of subsection (6).
9 & 10 Geo. 6. c. 70	Civil Aviation Act 1946	In the Third Schedule, paragraph 10, and sub-paragraph (c) of paragraph 14; in the Fourth Schedule, paragraphs 4 and 5, paragraph (b) of the proviso to paragraph 6, and sub-paragraphs (b) to (d) of paragraph 14; and in the Sixth Schedule, paragraphs 2 and 3, paragraph (o) of the proviso to paragraph 4, and sub-paragraphs (a) to (c) of paragraph 8.

Part II - as from the appointed day
Citation	Short title	Extent of repeal
52 & 53 Vict. c. 27	Advertising Stations (Rating) Act 1889	Section five.
3 Edw. 7. c. 33	Burgh Police (Scotland) Act 1903	Sections seventy-six, seventy-seven and seventy-eight, and paragraph (b) of section ninety-three.
7 Edw. 7. c. 27	Advertisements Regulation Act 1907	The whole act.
15 & 16 Geo. 5. c. 52	Advertisements Regulation Act 1925	The whole act.
15 & 16 Geo. 5. c. 68	Roads Improvement Act 1925	In section five, the proviso to subsection (7), and in section twelve, in paragraph (a) the words from "and a reference" to the end of the paragraph.
18 & 19 Geo. 5. c. 32	Petroleum (Consolidation) Act 1928	Section eleven and paragraph (2) of section twenty-four.
20 & 21 Geo. 5. c. 40	Housing (Scotland) Act 1930	In section twelve, in subsection (2), the words "and of any planning scheme in operation in the area." In section eighteen, in subsection (2), and in section twenty-one, in subsection (3), the words "and of any town planning scheme in operation in the area." In section forty-nine, in subsection (1), the definition of "town planning scheme".
21 & 22 Geo. 5. c. 16	Ancient Monuments Act 1931	Section two and in section sixteen, in subsection (1), the words from "the Town Planning (Scotland) Act, 1925" to the words "the Town Planning Act, 1925", and subsection (4).
22 & 23 Geo. 5. c. 49	Town and Country Planning (Scotland) Act 1932	The whole act.
25 & 26 Geo. 5. c. 41	Housing (Scotland) Act 1935	In section seventeen, in subsection (3), the words "and of any planning scheme in operation in the area." In the Fifth Schedule, in Part I, in the subsection substituted for subsection (2) of section twelve of the Housing (Scotland) Act 1930, the words "and of any planning scheme in operation in the area." Part II of the Fifth Schedule so far as relating to section forty-nine of the Housing (Scotland) Act 1930.
25 & 26 Geo. 5. c. 47	Restriction of Ribbon Development Act 1935	Sections one to three; sections five to twelve; in paragraph (a) of subsection (3) of section thirteen the words from "or which is for the time being" to the end of that paragraph; section fifteen; subsection (2) of section nineteen; subsection (1) of section twenty-three; subsection (1) of section twenty-four except the definitions of "building", "chief officer of police", "land", "middle of the road", "Minister", "owner", "place of public resort", "proposed road", "road", and "statutory undertakers", and subsection (2) of that section; and the First, Second and Third Schedules.
1 Edw. 8 & 1 Geo. 6. c. 5	Trunk Roads Act 1936	Subsections (2) to (5) of section four, and in the Fourth Schedule, paragraphs 1 to 4, and in paragraph 5, the words from "subject to restrictions in force" to the words "expenses incurred in so doing", and the proviso to that paragraph.
2 & 3 Geo. 6. c. 22	Camps Act 1939	Subsection (2) of section three; in section seven, in paragraph (a), the words from "for references to the Town and Country Planning Act, 1925," to the words "Town and Country Planning (Scotland) Act, 1932".
2 & 3 Geo. 6. c. 31	Civil Defence Act 1939	Section seventy, and in section ninety-one, in subsection (17), the words from "and for any reference to the Town and Country Planning Act, 1932," to the words "the Town and Country Planning (Scotland) Act, 1932".
6 & 7 Geo. 6. c. 34	Restriction of Ribbon Development (Temporary Development) Act 1943	The whole act.
6 & 7 Geo. 6. c. 43	Town and Country Planning (Interim Development) (Scotland) Act 1943	The whole act except section thirteen.
9 & 10 Geo. 6. c. 18	Statutory Orders (Special Procedure) Act 1945	The Second Schedule so far as relating to sections thirteen to fifteen, thirty-four and thirty-five of, and the Second and Third Schedules to, the Town and Country Planning (Scotland) Act 1945.
8 & 9 Geo. 6. c. 33	Town and Country Planning (Scotland) Act 1945	Sections one to seventeen; subsections (3) and (7) of section nineteen; section twenty; sections thirty to forty-five; section forty-seven; section forty-nine; section fifty A except subsection (4); sections fifty-one and fifty-two; section sixty; in subsection (1) of section sixty-two the definitions of "clearing", "first local advertisement", "interim development application", "interim development authority", "loan charges", "local highway authority", "planning scheme", "purchase order providing for expedited completion", "Valuation Office", "valuation roll" and "war damage"; sub-paragraphs (1)(a), (1)(b) and (1)(d) of paragraph 1 and the word "or," at the end of sub-paragraph (a2) and sub-paragraph (b) of paragraph 3 of the First Schedule; the Second and Third Schedules; the Fifth Schedule except paragraph 8; and in paragraph 12 of the Sixth Schedule the words from "and references to the confirmation," to the end of the paragraph.
8 & 9 Geo. 6. c. 36	Distribution of Industry Act 1945	Sections six, nine and ten.
9 & 10 Geo. 6. c. 30	Trunk Roads Act 1946	In section three, the proviso to subsection (2), and subsection (3); in section four, in subsection (2), the words from "and without prejudice" to the end of the subsection; in section eight, subsection (2); in section twelve, subsection (2); in section fourteen, subsection (2); and in the Third Schedule, in the amendment of section four of the Trunk Roads Act 1936, the words from the beginning to "as the case may be".
9 & 10 Geo. 6. c. 35	Building Restrictions (War-Time Contraventions) Act 1946	Subsection (2) of section four.
9 & 10 Geo. 6. c. 49	Acquisition of Land (Authorisation Procedure) Act 1946	The Fourth Schedule so far as relating to the Town and Country Planning (Scotland) Act 1932.
9 & 10 Geo. 6. c. 68	New Towns Act 1946	Subsections (3) and (4) of section three, and the Third Schedule.
10 & 11 Geo. 6. c. 42	Acquisition of Land (Authorisation Procedure) (Scotland) Act 1947	Paragraph (f) of subsection (4) of section one; in section two, in subsection (1), the words "or of the Town and Country Planning (Scotland) Act 1945"; and in subsection (4) the words "the Town and Country Planning (Scotland) Act, 1945"; and in the Second Schedule, in paragraph 8, the words from "for subsection (4) of section seventeen of the Town and Country Planning (Scotland) Act, 1945" to the end of the paragraph.

== Subsequent developments ==
The majority of the provisions of the act were repealed by section 277 of, and schedule 23 to, the Town and Country Planning (Scotland) Act 1972 (1972 c. 52), which received royal assent on 27 July 1972. Sections 44(1) and 45 were subsequently repealed by the Roads (Scotland) Act 1984 (1984 c. 54).
