= Trustee Act 1925 =

Act of the Parliament of the United Kingdom

Trustee Act 1925 (Note: Section 71(1).)
- Act of Parliament
- Parliament of the United Kingdom
- Long title: An Act to consolidate certain enactments relating to trustees in England and Wales.
- Citation: 15 & 16 Geo. 5. c. 19
- Territorial extent: England and Wales (Note: Section 71(3).)

Dates
- Royal assent: 9 April 1925
- Commencement: 1 January 1926 (Note: Section 71(2).)
Other legislation
Amends	See § Repealed enactments
Repeals/revokes	See § Repealed enactments
Amended by	Law of Property (Amendment) Act 1926; Married Women (Restraint upon Anticipation) Act 1949; Statute Law Revision Act 1950; Administration of Justice Act 1956; Isle of Man Act 1958; Mental Health Act 1959; Statute Law Revision Act 1963; Administration of Justice Act 1965; Criminal Law Act 1967; Family Law Reform Act 1969; Courts Act 1971; Powers of Attorney Act 1971; Statute Law (Repeals) Act 1978; Family Law Reform Act 1987; Landlord and Tenant (Covenants) Act 1995; Trusts of Land and Appointment of Trustees Act 1996; Trustee Act 2000; Mental Capacity Act 2005
Relates to	Copyhold Act 1894; Housing Act 1925; Housing (Scotland) Act 1925; Town Planning Act 1925; Town Planning (Scotland) Act 1925; Settled Land Act 1925; Law of Property Act 1925; Land Registration Act 1925; Land Charges Act 1925; Administration of Estates Act 1925; Universities and College Estates Act 1925; Supreme Court of Judicature (Consolidation) Act 1925; Workmen's Compensation Act 1925; Consumer Credit Act 1974

Status: Partially repealed

Text of statute as originally enacted

Revised text of statute as amended

Text of the Trustee Act 1925 as in force today (including any amendments) within the United Kingdom, from legislation.gov.uk.

The Trustee Act 1925 (15 & 16 Geo. 5. c. 19) is an act of the Parliament of the United Kingdom passed on 9 April 1925, which codified and updated the regulation of trustees' powers and appointment in England and Wales. It accompanied the land reform legislation of the 1920s. It came into effect on 1 January 1926.

== Provisions ==
=== Section 61 ===
There is a discretionary power available to the courts under this section which allows a trustee's personal liability for a breach of trust to be lifted if it appears to the court that the trustee "has acted honestly and reasonably, and ought fairly to be excused for the breach of trust and for omitting to obtain the directions of the court in the matter in which he committed such breach". The trustee could be relieved from personal liability "either wholly or partly".

In a 2012 ruling concerned with liability for payment of a mortgage sum fraudulently requested by imposters, the High Court assessed the requirements of honesty and reasonableness separately and found that the solicitors who had wrongly handed over payment had acted "honestly" but not "reasonably". In the Court of Appeal, this ruling was overturned and the circumstances allowed the solicitors to be "fairly excused" their breach of trust.

=== Repealed enactments ===
Section 70 of the act repealed 15 enactments, listed in the second schedule to the act.

Citation	Short title	Extent of repeal
22 & 23 Vict. c. 35	Law of Property Amendment Act 1859	Sections twenty-three, twenty-seven, twenty-eight and twenty-nine.
44 & 45 Vict. c. 41	Conveyancing Act 1881	Subsections (4) and (5) of section forty-two.
48 & 49 Vict. c. 25	East India Unclaimed Stock Act 1885	Subsection (3) of section twenty-three.
53 & 54 Vict. c. 5	Lunacy Act 1890	Sections one hundred and thirty-five to one hundred and thirty-eight, so far as they relate to lunatic trustees, except where the Judge or Master in Lunacy is given concurrent jurisdiction with the High Court.
56 & 57 Vict. c. 53	Trustee Act 1893	The whole act.
57 & 58 Vict. c. 10	Trustee Act 1893, Amendment Act 1894	Sections one and four.
59 & 60 Vict. c. 35	Judicial Trustees Act 1896	Section three.
1 & 2 Geo. 5. c. 37	Conveyancing Act 1911	Section eight.
1 & 2 Geo. 5. c. 40	Lunacy Act 1911	Section one.
4 & 5 Geo. 5. c. 47	Deeds of Arrangement Act 1914	Section eighteen.
9 & 10 Geo. 5. c. 99	Housing (Additional Powers) Act 1919	Section nine.
11 & 12 Geo. 5. c. 55	Railways Act 1921	The words "the Trustee Act, 1893, and" in section fifteen.
12 & 13 Geo. 5. c. 16	Law of Property Act 1922	Subsection (4) of section eighty-three, section eighty-eight; Part IV., except subsection (7) of section one hundred and ten, subsection (3) of section one hundred and thirteen, and subsection (5) of section one hundred and twenty-three.
12 & 13 Geo. 5. c. 60	Lunacy Act 1922	Subsections (3), (4) and (5) of section two.
15 Geo. 5. c. 5	Law of Property (Amendment) Act 1924	Section five and the Fifth Schedule.

== Subsequent developments ==
Section 65 of the act was repealed by section 10(2) of, and part I of schedule 3 to, the Criminal Law Act 1967, which came into force on 1 January 1968.

Part I of the act was repealed by section 40(3) of, and part II of schedule 4 to, the Trustee Act 2000, which came into force on 1 February 2001. The 2000 act replaced the investment powers of trustees with a broader statutory duty of care and a general power of investment.

== See also ==
- English property law
- English trusts law
- Land Registration Act 1925
- Trustee Act 2000
