= Settled Estates Act 1877 =

Act of the Parliament of the United Kingdom

Settled Estates Act 1877 (Note: Section 1.)
- Act of Parliament
- Parliament of the United Kingdom
- Long title: An Act to consolidate and amend the Law relating to Leases and Sales of Settled Estates.
- Citation: 40 & 41 Vict. c. 18
- Territorial extent: England and Wales; Ireland; (Note: Section 60.)

Dates
- Royal assent: 28 June 1877
- Commencement: 1 November 1877 (Note: Section 61.)
- Repealed: 1 January 1926
Other legislation
Amends	See § Repealed enactments
Repeals/revokes	See § Repealed enactments
Amended by	Judicature (Northern Ireland) Act 1978
Repealed by	Law of Property (Amendment) Act 1924; Settled Land Act 1925
Relates to	Settled Land Act 1882; Settled Land Act 1925

Status: Partially repealed

Text of statute as originally enacted

The Settled Estates Act 1877 (40 & 41 Vict. c. 18) is an act of the Parliament of the United Kingdom that consolidated and amended enactments relating to leases and sales of settled estates in England and Wales and Ireland.

== Provisions ==
=== Repealed enactments ===
Section 58 of the act repealed 5 enactments, listed in the schedule to the act.

Enactments repealed by section 58
Citation	Short title	Description	Extent of repeal
19 & 20 Vict. c. 120	Settled Estates Act 1856	An Act to facilitate leases and sales of Settled Estates.	The whole act.
21 & 22 Vict. c. 77	Settled Estates Act 1858	An Act to amend and extend the Settled Estates Act of 1856.	The whole act.
27 & 28 Vict. c. 45	Settled Estates Act 1864	An Act to further amend the Settled Estates Act of 1856.	The whole act.
37 & 38 Vict. c. 33	Leases and Sales of Settled Estates Amendment Act 1874	The Leases and Sales of Settled Estates Amendment Act, 1874.	The whole act.
39 & 40 Vict. c. 30	Settled Estates Act 1876	The Settled Estates Act, 1876.	The whole act.

== Subsequent developments ==
The whole act was repealed for England and Wales by section 1 of, and the first schedule to, the Law of Property (Amendment) Act 1924 (15 & 16 Geo. 5. c. 5), which came into force on 1 January 1926.

The whole act was repealed for England and Wales by section 119 of, and the fifth schedule to, the Settled Land Act 1925 (15 & 16 Geo. 5. c. 18), which came into force on 1 January 1926.
