= Universities and College Estates Act 1925 =

Act of the Parliament of the United Kingdom

Universities and College Estates Act 1925 (Note: Section 45(1).)
- Act of Parliament
- Parliament of the United Kingdom
- Long title: An Act to consolidate the Universities and College Estates Acts, 1858 to 1898, and enactments amending those Acts.
- Citation: 15 & 16 Geo. 5. c. 24
- Territorial extent: United Kingdom

Dates
- Royal assent: 9 April 1925
- Commencement: 1 January 1926 (Note: Section 45(2).)

Other legislation
- Amends: See § Repealed enactments
- Repeals/revokes: See § Repealed enactments
- Amended by: Statute Law Revision Act 1950; Highways Act 1959; Universities and College Estates Act 1964; Statute Law (Repeals) Act 1969; Statute Law (Repeals) Act 1986; Trusts of Land and Appointment of Trustees Act 1996; Statute Law (Repeals) Act 1998; Statute Law (Repeals) Act 2004; Charities Act 2022
- Relates to: Housing Act 1925; Housing (Scotland) Act 1925; Town Planning Act 1925; Town Planning (Scotland) Act 1925; Settled Land Act 1925; Trustee Act 1925; Law of Property Act 1925; Land Registration Act 1925; Land Charges Act 1925; Administration of Estates Act 1925; Supreme Court of Judicature (Consolidation) Act 1925; Workmen's Compensation Act 1925

Status: Partially repealed

Text of statute as originally enacted

Revised text of statute as amended

Text of the Universities and College Estates Act 1925 as in force today (including any amendments) within the United Kingdom, from legislation.gov.uk.

The Universities and College Estates Act 1925 (15 & 16 Geo. 5. c. 24) is an act of the Parliament of the United Kingdom that consolidated enactments relating to the management of estates belonging to certain universities and colleges.

== Provisions ==
=== Repealed enactments ===
Section 44 of the act repealed 8 enactments, listed in the second schedule to the act.

Citation	Short title	Description	Extent of repeal
18 Eliz. c. 6	Universities and Colleges (Leases, etc.) Act 1575	An Act for maintenance of the colleges in the universities and of Winchester and Eaton	The whole act.
3 & 4 Vict. c. 113	Ecclesiastical Commissioners Act 1840	The Ecclesiastical Commissioners Act, 1840.	Section sixty-nine.
21 & 22 Vict. c. 44	Universities and College Estates Act 1858	The Universities and College Estates Act, 1858.	The whole act.
23 & 24 Vict. c. 59	Universities and College Estates Act Extension 1860	The Universities and College Estates Act Extension, 1860.	The whole act.
43 & 44 Vict. c. 46	Universities and College Estates Amendment Act 1880	The Universities and College Estates Amendment Act, 1880.	The whole act.
61 & 62 Vict. c. 55	Universities and College Estates Act 1898	The Universities and College Estates Act, 1898,	The whole act.
12 & 13 Geo. 5. c. 16	Law of Property Act 1922	The Law of Property Act, 1922	Such of the provisions of Part II. and the Tenth Schedule as are applied to universities and college estates.
15 & 16 Geo. 5. c. 5	Law of Property (Amendment) Act 1924	The Law of Property (Amendment) Act, 1924.	Section eleven and the Eleventh Schedule.

== Subsequent developments ==
Sections 2 to 38 of, and the first schedule to, the act were repealed, and a new section 1A was inserted granting the universities and colleges to which the act applies all the powers of an absolute owner in relation to their land, by section 24(3) of the Charities Act 2022 (2022 c. 6), which came into force on 19 May 2025.
