= Debts Recovery Act 1830 =

Act of the Parliament of the United Kingdom

Debts Recovery Act 1830 (Note: The citation of this act by this short title was authorised by section 1 of, and the first schedule to, the Short Titles Act 1896. Due to the repeal of those provisions it is now authorised by section 19(2) of the Interpretation Act 1978.)
- Act of Parliament
- Parliament of the United Kingdom
- Long title: An Act for consolidating and amending the Laws for facilitating the Payment of Debts out of Real Estate.
- Citation: 11 Geo. 4 & 1 Will. 4. c. 47
- Territorial extent: United Kingdom

Dates
- Royal assent: 16 July 1830
- Commencement: 16 July 1830 (Note: The Acts of Parliament (Commencement) Act 1793.)
- Repealed: England and Wales: 1 January 1926; Northern Ireland: 1 January 1956
Other legislation
Amends	See § Repealed enactments
Repeals/revokes	See § Repealed enactments
Amended by	Debts Recovery Act 1848
Repealed by	England and Wales: Administration of Estates Act 1925; Northern Ireland: Administration of Estates Act (Northern Ireland) 1955

Status: Repealed

Text of statute as originally enacted

The Debts Recovery Act 1830 (11 Geo. 4 & 1 Will. 4. c. 47) was an act of the Parliament of the United Kingdom.

== Provisions ==
=== Repealed enactments ===
Section 1 of the act repealed 3 enactments, listed in that section.

Citation	Short title	Description	Extent of repeal
3 & 4 Will. & Mar. c. 14	Fraudulent Devises Act 1691	An Act passed in the Third and Fourth Years of King William and Queen Mary, intituled An Act for the Relief of Creditors against fraudulent Devises, which was made perpetual by An Act passed in the Sixth and Seventh Years of King William the Third, intituled An Act for continuing several Laws therein mentioned.	The whole act.
4 Anne c. 5 (I)	Fraudulent Devises Act 1705	An Act passed by the Parliament of Ireland, in the Fourth Year of Queen Anne, intituled An Act for Relief of Creditors against fraudulent Devises.	The whole act.
47 Geo. 3. Sess. 2. c. 74	Debts of Traders Act 1807	An Act was passed in the Forty-seventh Year of His late Majesty King George the Third, intituled An Act for more effectually securing the Payment of Debts of Traders.	The whole act.

== Subsequent developments ==
The whole act was repealed for England and Wales by section 56 of, and the second schedule to, the Administration of Estates Act 1925 (15 & 16 Geo. 5. c. 23), which came into force on 1 January 1926.

The whole act was repealed for Northern Ireland by section 46(b) of, and the third schedule to, the Administration of Estates Act (Northern Ireland) 1955 (c. 24 (N.I.)), which came into force on 1 January 1956.
