= Town and Country Planning (Scotland) Act 1932 =

Act of the Parliament of the United Kingdom

Town and Country Planning (Scotland) Act 1932 (Note: Section 55.)
- Act of Parliament
- Parliament of the United Kingdom
- Long title: An Act to authorise the making of schemes with respect to the development and planning of land in Scotland, whether urban or rural, and in that connection to repeal and re-enact with amendments the enactments relating to town planning; to provide for the protection of rural amenities and the preservation of buildings and other objects of interest or beauty; to facilitate the acquisition of land in Scotland for garden cities; and to make other provision in connection with the matters aforesaid.
- Citation: 22 & 23 Geo. 5. c. 49
- Territorial extent: United Kingdom (Note: Not explicitly stated within the act.)

Dates
- Royal assent: 12 July 1932
- Commencement: 1 April 1933
- Repealed: 1 July 1948
Other legislation
Amends	See § Repealed enactments
Repeals/revokes	See § Repealed enactments
Amended by	Local Government (Scotland) Act 1947
Repealed by	Town and Country Planning (Scotland) Act 1947
Relates to	Town Planning (Scotland) Act 1925; Town and Country Planning Act 1932

Status: Repealed

Text of statute as originally enacted

The Town and Country Planning (Scotland) Act 1932 (22 & 23 Geo. 5. c. 49) was an act of the Parliament of the United Kingdom that repealed and re-enacted with amendments the enactments relating to town planning in Scotland, extending planning controls to rural as well as urban land.

The Town and Country Planning Act 1932 (22 & 23 Geo. 5. c. 48) made corresponding provisions for England and Wales.

== Provisions ==
=== Repealed enactments ===
Section 53(1) of the act repealed 2 enactments, listed in the fifth schedule to the act.

Citation	Short title	Extent of repeal
15 & 16 Geo. 5. c. 17	Town Planning (Scotland) Act 1925	The whole act.
17 & 18 Geo. 5. c. 23	Crown Lands Act 1927	Section twelve.

== Subsequent developments ==
The whole act was repealed by section 109(2) of, and part II of the ninth schedule to, the Town and Country Planning (Scotland) Act 1947 (10 & 11 Geo. 6. c. 53), which came into force on 1 July 1948.
