= Mortgage Corp v Shaire =

Mortgage Corporation v Shaire
- Court: High Court
- Full case name: Mortgage Corporation v (Marsha) Shaire and others (Lewis Silkin and Mr M Blaxill, solicitor, their appeal adjourned per their admission of liability under Zwebner and under Penn respectively)
- Decided: 25 February 2000
- Citations: [2000] EWHC Ch 452 (2000) 80 P & CR 280 [2000] EG 35 [2000] 1 FLR 973 [2000] 2 FCR 222 [2001] Ch 743 [2001] 3 WLR 639 [2001] 4 All ER 364 [2000] BPIR 483 [2000] WTLR 357 [2000] 3 EGLR 131 [2000] Fam Law 402

Case history
- Prior action: none
- Subsequent action: none

Court membership
- Judge sitting: Neuberger J

Keywords
- Co-ownership, trust of land

Mortgage Corporation v Shaire [2001] Ch 743 is a widely reported English land law case relating to the Trusts of Land and Appointment of Trustees Act 1996. Such a status specifically flowed from an instance of non est factum mortgage fraud where the mortgage lender and the defrauded co-owner wished to accelerate and delay sale respectively. The case is relevant to matrimonial law in that the respective equitable shares in the home awarded to Mrs Shaire and Mr Fox in 1987 matrimonial proceedings were never defined and it fell to the court to define these.

The parties accepted the settled law of mortgages that the mortgage could only be applied against the defrauding co-owner's share, not against the innocent co-owner who was duped and was without knowledge of the mortgage loan.

The court made broad, reasoned announcements on the end of the old law and old doctrine of "trusts for sale". The extent of co-ownership was a side issue, determined also by the case. It fixed the Mrs Shaire's share at 75% and her partner for the past three-to-four years at 25%.

== Facts ==
Mr Marvin Fox and Marsha Shaire lived at 74 Winchmore Hill Road, London N14 as joint tenants following a transfer at the time of the divorce proceedings in 1987. Mr Fox died in 1992, and it transpired he had forged Mrs Shaire's signature, and mortgaged the property to Mortgage Corporation. It was accepted their charge was valid against his share. (Note: Expressly approving Fisher and Lightwood –– Law of Mortgage (10th ed) at p255; Thames Guaranty Ltd v Campbell [1985] QB 210 at p234G; and Ahmed v Kendrick (1988) 56 P & CR 120 at pp125-126.) However, payments were not met and the bank applied for a possession order under TLATA 1996 section 14. Mrs Shaire argued that under section 15 her interest should prevail over those of the creditors.

== Judgment ==
Neuberger J held that Parliament intended with Trusts of Land and Appointment of Trustees Act 1996 (ToLATA) s 15 to replace trusts for sale with trusts of land, and thus give the court more discretion and 'to tip the balance somewhat more in favour of families and against banks and other charges'. The interest of the chargee was just one factor, and there was no suggestion that it should be given more weight. It was in the court's discretion. In the circumstances, the court would not make an order until the parties had had an opportunity to consider the consequences of the court's conclusions on the law. Old cases should be treated with caution.

the very name “trust for sale” and the law as it has been developed by the courts suggests that under the old [1925] law, in the absence of a strong reason to the contrary, the court should order sale. Nothing in the language of the new code as found in the 1996 Act supports that approach.

Instead, the claimant's interest should be converted to a loan for Mrs Shaire to pay off over time. If she could not meet the requirements of the loan, then the court would order a sale, but only after consideration had been given to properties available to Mrs Shaire with the money that would be realised upon sale of the house. The court also held that Mrs Shaire would never have intended for Mr Fox to have a 50% interest in the property, and therefore set his share at 25%.

== See also ==
- English property law
- English trusts law
