= Town and Country Planning Act 1932 =

Act of the Parliament of the United Kingdom

Town and Country Planning Act 1932 (Note: Section 58(1).)
- Act of Parliament
- Parliament of the United Kingdom
- Long title: An Act to authorise the making of schemes with respect to the development and planning of land, whether urban or rural, and in that connection to repeal and re-enact with amendments the enactments relating to town planning; to provide for the protection of rural amenities and the preservation of buildings and other objects of interest or beauty; to facilitate the acquisition of land for garden cities; and to make other provision in connection with the matters aforesaid.
- Citation: 22 & 23 Geo. 5. c. 48
- Territorial extent: England and Wales; Scotland; (Note: Section 58(2) provides that the act shall not extend to Northern Ireland. Under section 57, the act applied to Scotland subject to the adaptations in the Sixth Schedule, but a certified copy was prepared and deposited as a separate Act (the Town and Country Planning (Scotland) Act 1932), whereupon this Act ceased to apply to Scotland.)

Dates
- Royal assent: 12 July 1932
- Commencement: 1 April 1933 (Note: Section 58.)
- Repealed: 1 July 1948
Other legislation
| Amends | See § Repealed enactments |
| Repeals/revokes | See § Repealed enactments |
| Repealed by | Town and Country Planning Act 1947 |
| Relates to | Town Planning Act 1925; Town and Country Planning (Scotland) Act 1932 |

Status: Repealed

Text of statute as originally enacted

The Town and Country Planning Act 1932 (22 & 23 Geo. 5. c. 48) was an act of the Parliament of the United Kingdom that repealed and re-enacted with amendments the enactments relating to town planning in England and Wales, extending planning controls to rural as well as urban land.

The Town and Country Planning (Scotland) Act 1932 (22 & 23 Geo. 5. c. 49) made corresponding provisions for Scotland.

== Provisions ==
=== Repealed enactments ===
Section 54(1) of the act repealed 3 enactments, listed in the fifth schedule to the act.

| Citation | Short title | Extent of repeal |
|---|---|---|
| 15 & 16 Geo. 5. c. 16 | Town Planning Act 1925 | The whole act. |
| 17 & 18 Geo. 5. c. 23 | Crown Lands Act 1927 | Section twelve. |
| 19 & 20 Geo. 5. c. 17 | Local Government Act 1929 | Sections forty to forty-five. |

== Subsequent developments ==
The whole act was repealed by section 113(2) of, and part II of the ninth schedule to, the Town and Country Planning Act 1947 (10 & 11 Geo. 6. c. 51), which came into operation on 1 July 1948.
