= Housing of the Working Classes Act 1900 =

Act of the Parliament of the United Kingdom

Housing of the Working Classes Act 1900 (Note: Section 8(1).)
- Act of Parliament
- Parliament of the United Kingdom
- Long title: An Act to amend Part III. of the Housing of the Working Classes Act, 1890.
- Citation: 63 & 64 Vict. c. 59
- Territorial extent: England and Wales (Note: Section 8(1).)

Dates
- Royal assent: 8 August 1900
- Commencement: 8 August 1900 (Note: The Acts of Parliament (Commencement) Act 1793.)
- Repealed: 1 July 1925
Other legislation
Amends	Housing of the Working Classes Act 1890
Amended by	Housing, Town Planning, etc. Act 1909; Housing, Town Planning, &c. Act 1919
Repealed by	England and Wales: Housing Act 1925; Scotland: Housing (Scotland) Act 1925

Status: Repealed

Text of statute as originally enacted

The Housing of the Working Classes Act 1900 (63 & 64 Vict. c. 59) was an act of the Parliament of the United Kingdom.

== Background ==
The Housing of the Working Classes Act 1885 (48 & 49 Vict. c. 72) was a public health act, not a housing act. It empowered local authorities to condemn slum housing, but not to purchase the land or finance new housing. The Housing of the Working Classes Act 1890 (53 & 54 Vict. c. 70) gave urban authorities the legal power to buy land and to construct tenements and housing estates. The 1900 act empowered authorities to purchase land for the same purpose outside of their jurisdictions.

== The 1890 act ==
The Housing of the Working Classes Act 1890 (53 & 54 Vict. c. 70) is made up of four parts and seven schedules.

The Housing of the Working Classes Act 1894 (57 & 58 Vict. c. 55) amended the financial provisions of part 2 of the principal act.

== The 1900 act ==
This act was an extension to the 1890 act to empower authorities (other than rural district councils) under part 3 of the 1890 act to acquire land for housing purposes outside the area over which they have jurisdiction, and permitting metropolitan borough councils, if they so desire, to become authorities under part 3 of the principal act.

== Implications ==
This gave local authorities the legal power to buy land through compulsory purchase and to construct tenements and housing estates. Part 3 of the principal act allowed councils to:

1. lease land for the erection thereon of workmen's dwellings
2. itself undertake the erection of dwellings or the improvement or reconstruction of existing dwellings
3. fit up, furnish and maintain lodging working classes
4. make any necessary by-laws and regulations for the management and use of the lodging houses
5. sell dwellings or lodging houses established for seven years or upwards under Part III of the act whenever such dwellings or lodging houses are deemed by the council and the Local Government Board to be unnecessary or too expensive to keep up.

== Subsequent developments ==
The whole act was repealed for England and Wales by section 136 of, and the sixth schedule to, the Housing Act 1925 (15 & 16 Geo. 5. c. 14) and for Scotland by section 120 of, and the sixth schedule to, the Housing (Scotland) Act 1925 (15 & 16 Geo. 5. c. 15), which both came into force on 1 July 1925.

== See also ==
- Boundary Estate
