= Land Registration Act 1925 =

Act of the Parliament of the United Kingdom

Land Registration Act 1925 (Note: Section 148(1).)
- Act of Parliament
- Parliament of the United Kingdom
- Long title: An Act to consolidate the Land Transfer Acts and the statute law relating to registered land.
- Citation: 15 & 16 Geo. 5. c. 21
- Territorial extent: England and Wales (Note: Section 148(3).)

Dates
- Royal assent: 9 April 1925
- Commencement: 1 January 1926 (Note: Section 148(2).)
- Repealed: 13 October 2003 (Note: The Land Registration Act 2002 (Commencement No. 4) Order 2003 (SI 2003/1725).)
Other legislation
Amends	See § Repealed enactments
Repeals/revokes	See § Repealed enactments
Amended by	Solicitors Act 1932; Land Registration Act 1936; Tithe Act 1936; Solicitors, Public Notaries, &c. Act 1949; Administration of Justice Act 1956; Mental Health Act 1959; Crown Estate Act 1961; Administration of Justice Act 1965; Land Registration Act 1966; Courts Act 1971; Administration of Justice Act 1977; Statute Law (Repeals) Act 1986; Drug Trafficking Offences Act 1986; Landlord and Tenant Act 1987; Diplomatic and Consular Premises Act 1987; Land Registration Act 1988; Coal Industry Act 1994; Drug Trafficking Act 1994; Landlord and Tenant (Covenants) Act 1995; Trusts of Land and Appointment of Trustees Act 1996; Commonhold and Leasehold Reform Act 2002
Repealed by	Land Registration Act 2002
Relates to	Housing Act 1925; Housing (Scotland) Act 1925; Town Planning Act 1925; Town Planning (Scotland) Act 1925; Settled Land Act 1925; Trustee Act 1925; Law of Property Act 1925; Land Charges Act 1925; Administration of Estates Act 1925; Universities and College Estates Act 1925; Supreme Court of Judicature (Consolidation) Act 1925; Workmen's Compensation Act 1925

Status: Repealed

Text of statute as originally enacted

Revised text of statute as amended

The Land Registration Act 1925 (15 & 16 Geo. 5. c. 21) was an act of the Parliament of the United Kingdom that codified, prioritised, and extended the system of land registration in England and Wales. It has largely been repealed, and updated in the Land Registration Act 2002.

== Background ==
After the Land Registry Act 1862 (25 & 26 Vict. c. 53) and further attempts in 1875 and 1897 failed, as they either tried to register everything or largely relied on voluntary registration, the 1925 act was drafted to ensure a more complete, but progressive system.

The Land Registration Act 1925 was passed along with a package of reforms of the land and settlement system, including the Law of Property Act 1925 (15 & 16 Geo. 5. c. 20), the Trustee Act 1925 (15 & 16 Geo. 5. c. 19), the Settled Land Act 1925 (15 & 16 Geo. 5. c. 18) and the Land Charges Act 1925 (15 & 16 Geo. 5. c. 22). The act was amended by the Land Registration Act 1936 (26 Geo. 5 & 1 Edw. 8. c. 26).

The subsequent Commons Registration Act 1965 made reference to the Land Registration Acts 1925 and 1936.

== Provisions ==
The basic premise of the act was that interests in registered land had to be registered in order to bind future purchasers of the property. One of the most important provisions was that if someone had not registered the interests listed in section 70, these would nevertheless "override" the rights of a future purchaser. In particular, under section 70(1)(g), a person who had an equitable interest under a trust, and who was in actual occupation of the home, would be able to claim an overriding interest. The occupant would have priority over future purchases without his consent, as if his interest had been in fact registered.

=== Repealed enactments ===
Section 147(1) of the act repealed 6 enactments, listed in the schedule to the act.

Citation	Short title	Extent of repeal
38 & 39 Vict. c. 87	Land Transfer Act 1875	The whole act.
49 & 50 Vict. c. 1	Land Registry Act 1886	The whole act.
60 & 61 Vict. c. 65	Land Transfer Act 1897	The whole act except Part I. thereof.
8 Edw. 7. c. 36	Small Holdings and Allotments Act 1908	Subsection (4) of section twelve, from " and thereupon " to " Land Transfer Acts, 1875 to 1897," and section thirteen.
12 & 13 Geo. 5. c. 16	Law of Property Act 1922	Subsections (8) and (10) of section one hundred and fifty-eight; subsection (8) of section one hundred and sixty; Part X.; section seven of Part I. of the First Schedule, and the Sixteenth Schedule.
15 Geo. 5. c. 5	Law of Property (Amendment) Act 1924	Section eight and the Eighth Schedule.

== Subsequent developments ==
The whole act was repealed by section 135 of, and schedule 13 to, the Land Registration Act 2002, which came into force on 13 October 2003.

== See also ==
- English land law
