= Land Registration Act 1936 =

Act of the Parliament of the United Kingdom

Land Registration Act 1936 (Note: Section 9(1).)
- Act of Parliament
- Parliament of the United Kingdom
- Long title: An Act to amend the procedure under the Land Registration Act, 1925, for the making of orders declaring the registration of title to land to be compulsory on sale; to provide for the partial closing of, and otherwise amend the law with respect to, the Middlesex Deeds Registry; to amend subsection (4) of section seventy-five of the Land Registration Act, 1925; to amend the law with respect to the Insurance Fund established under the Land Transfer Act, 1897, and the fees payable under the Land Registration Act, 1925; and for purposes connected with the matters aforesaid.
- Citation: 26 Geo. 5 & 1 Edw. 8. c. 26
- Territorial extent: United Kingdom

Dates
- Royal assent: 14 July 1936
- Commencement: 14 July 1936 (Note: The Acts of Parliament (Commencement) Act 1793.)
Other legislation
| Amends | Land Registration Act 1925 |
| Amended by | Statute Law Revision Act 1950; Statute Law Revision Act 1963; Land Registration Act 1966; Land Registration and Land Charges Act 1971; Superannuation Act 1972 |
| Relates to | Land Transfer Act 1897; Land Registration Act 1925 |

Status: Amended

Text of statute as originally enacted

Revised text of statute as amended

Text of the Land Registration Act 1936 as in force today (including any amendments) within the United Kingdom, from legislation.gov.uk.

The Land Registration Act 1936 (26 Geo. 5 & 1 Edw. 8. c. 26) (LRA) is an act of the Parliament of the United Kingdom that amended the Land Registration Act 1925 (15 & 16 Geo. 5. c. 21), concerning land registration in England and Wales. It has largely been repealed, and updated in the Land Registration Act 2002.

The subsequent Commons Registration Act 1965 made reference to the Land Registration Acts 1925 and 1936.

== See also ==
- Land Registry Act 1862
