= Settled Land Act 1925 =

Act of the Parliament of the United Kingdom

Settled Land Act 1925 (Note: Section 120(1).)
- Act of Parliament
- Parliament of the United Kingdom
- Long title: An Act to consolidate the enactments relating to Settled Land in England and Wales.
- Citation: 15 & 16 Geo. 5. c. 18
- Territorial extent: England and Wales (Note: Section 120(3).)

Dates
- Royal assent: 9 April 1925
- Commencement: 1 January 1926 (Note: Section 120(2).)
Other legislation
Amends	See § Repealed enactments
Repeals/revokes	See § Repealed enactments
Amended by	Law of Property (Amendment) Act 1926; Married Women (Restraint upon Anticipation) Act 1949; Highways Act 1959; Mental Health Act 1959; Charities Act 1960; Family Law Reform Act 1969; Statute Law (Repeals) Act 1969; Trusts of Land and Appointment of Trustees Act 1996; Statute Law (Repeals) Act 1998; Trustee Act 2000; Land Registration Act 2002; Statute Law (Repeals) Act 2004
Relates to	Law of Property (Amendment) Act 1924; Housing Act 1925; Housing (Scotland) Act 1925; Town Planning Act 1925; Town Planning (Scotland) Act 1925; Trustee Act 1925; Law of Property Act 1925; Land Registration Act 1925; Land Charges Act 1925; Administration of Estates Act 1925; Universities and College Estates Act 1925; Supreme Court of Judicature (Consolidation) Act 1925; Workmen's Compensation Act 1925; Trusts of Land and Appointment of Trustees Act 1996

Status: Partially repealed

Text of statute as originally enacted

Revised text of statute as amended

Text of the Settled Land Act 1925 as in force today (including any amendments) within the United Kingdom, from legislation.gov.uk.

The Settled Land Act 1925 (15 & 16 Geo. 5. c. 18) is an act of the Parliament of the United Kingdom that consolidated enactments relating to settled land in England and Wales.

== Provisions ==
=== Repealed enactments ===
Section 119 of the act repealed 19 enactments, listed in the fifth schedule to the act.

Citation	Short title	Extent of repeal
22 & 23 Vict. c. 35	Law of Property Amendment Act 1859	Section thirteen.
40 & 41 Vict. c. 18	Settled Estates Act 1877	The whole act.
44 & 45 Vict. c. 41	Conveyancing Act 1881	Subsections (1) (2) (3) and (7) of section forty-two.
45 & 46 Vict. c. 38	Settled Land Act 1882	The whole act except section thirty.
47 & 48 Vict. c. 18	Settled Land Act 1884	The whole act.
50 & 51 Vict. c. 30	Settled Land Acts (Amendment) Act 1887	The whole act.
51 & 52 Vict. c. 42	Mortmain and Charitable Uses Act 1888	Subsections (6) and (9) of section four and sections five and nine, so far as those subsections and sections relate to assurances executed after the commencement of this Act.
52 & 53 Vict. c. 47	Palatine Court of Durham Act 1889	In section ten the words "The Settled Land Act, 1882, and the Settled Land Act, 1884."
53 & 54 Vict. c. 69	Settled Land Act 1890	The whole act.
53 & 54 Vict. c. 70	Housing of the Working Classes Act 1890	Subsection (1) of section seventy-four.
8 Edw. 7. c. 36	Small Holdings and Allotments Act 1908	Subsections (4) and (5) of section forty.
9 Edw. 7. c. 44	Housing, Town Planning, &c. Act 1909	Section seven.
1 & 2 Geo. 5. c. 37	Conveyancing Act 1911	Section fourteen.
9 & 10 Geo. 5. c. 35	Housing, Town Planning, &c., Act 1919	Section thirty-one.
9 & 10 Geo. 5. c. 59	Land Settlement (Facilities) Act 1919	Section twenty-nine.
11 & 12 Geo. 5. c. 20	Tithe Annuities Apportionment Act 1921	Section two.
12 & 13 Geo. 5. c. 16	Law of Property Act 1922	Section three, so far as it relates to equitable interests and powers arising under a settlement; sections four, ten and thirteen so far as they relate to settled land; the first paragraph of subsection (4) of section seven; sections twelve and twenty-six; subsection (2) of section twenty-eight; sections thirty-five to forty-two; Part II. except such of the provisions thereof as are applied to universities and college estates so far as they apply thereto, and as respects section forty-three except so far as it relates to glebes; section eighty-six. Part II. of the First Schedule so far as it relates to settled land. The Third Schedule so far as it relates to settled land. The Fifth Schedule. In the Sixth Schedule paragraphs one and three and sub-paragraphs (1) (3) and (4) of paragraph four. In the Ninth Schedule Forms Nos. 1 to 4, inclusive, and No. 8 so far as it relates to settled land. The Tenth Schedule.
13 & 14 Geo. 5. c. 9	Agricultural Holdings Act 1923	Section twenty-one.
15 Geo. 5. c. 5	Law of Property (Amendment) Act 1924	Section four and the Fourth Schedule.

== Subsequent developments ==
The Trusts of Land and Appointment of Trustees Act 1996 (c. 47), which came into force on 1 January 1997, provided that no settlement created after its commencement could be a settlement for the purposes of the act, preventing the creation of new strict settlements while preserving the act's operation for settlements already in existence at that date.

== Bibliography ==
- Scamell, Ernest H. (1957). "8 The Reform of the Settled Land Act, 1925". Current Legal Problems. 10 (1): 152–167. doi:10.1093/clp/10.1.152.
