= Law of Property Act 1925 =

Act of the Parliament of the United Kingdom

Law of Property Act 1925 (Note: Section 209(1).)
- Act of Parliament
- Parliament of the United Kingdom
- Long title: An Act to consolidate the enactments relating to Conveyancing and the Law of Property in England and Wales.
- Citation: 15 & 16 Geo. 5. c. 20
- Introduced by: Lord Birkenhead (Lords)
- Territorial extent: England and Wales (Note: Section 209(3).)

Dates
- Royal assent: 9 April 1925
- Commencement: 1 January 1926 (Note: Section 209(2).)
Other legislation
Amends	See § Repealed enactments
Repeals/revokes	See § Repealed enactments
Amended by	Administration of Justice Act 1932; Tithe Act 1936; Criminal Justice Act 1948; Married Women (Restraint upon Anticipation) Act 1949; Administration of Justice Act 1956; Mental Health Act 1959; Industrial and Provident Societies Act 1965; Family Law Reform Act 1969; Statute Law (Repeals) Act 1969; Courts Act 1971; Powers of Attorney Act 1971; Friendly Societies Act 1971; Trusts of Land and Appointment of Trustees Act 1996; Law of Property (Miscellaneous Provisions) Act 1989; Landlord and Tenant (Covenants) Act 1995; Countryside and Rights of Way Act 2000; Land Registration Act 2002; Commonhold and Leasehold Reform Act 2002; Statute Law (Repeals) Act 2004; Mental Capacity Act 2005; Commons Act 2006; Postal Services Act 2011; Infrastructure Act 2015
Relates to	Copyhold Act 1894; Housing Act 1925; Housing (Scotland) Act 1925; Town Planning Act 1925; Town Planning (Scotland) Act 1925; Settled Land Act 1925; Trustee Act 1925; Land Registration Act 1925; Land Charges Act 1925; Administration of Estates Act 1925; Universities and College Estates Act 1925; Supreme Court of Judicature (Consolidation) Act 1925; Workmen's Compensation Act 1925; Consumer Credit Act 1974

Status: Amended

Text of statute as originally enacted

Revised text of statute as amended

Text of the Law of Property Act 1925 as in force today (including any amendments) within the United Kingdom, from legislation.gov.uk.

The Law of Property Act 1925 (15 & 16 Geo. 5. c. 20) is an act of the Parliament of the United Kingdom. It forms part of an interrelated programme of legislation introduced by Lord Chancellor Lord Birkenhead between 1922 and 1925 that was intended to modernise the English law of real property. It is often referred to as the LPA 1925.

The act, as amended, provides the core of modern English land law, particularly as regards many aspects of freehold land which is itself an important consideration in all other types of interest in land.

== Background ==
The keynote policy of the act was to reduce the number of legal estates to two – freehold and leasehold – and generally to make the transfer of interests in land easier for purchasers. Other policies were to regulate mortgages and as to leases, to regulate mainly their assignment, and to tackle some of the lacunae, ambiguities and shortcomings in the law of property. Innovations included the default creation of easements under section 62 to reduce unintended denial of access, and statutory enlargement under section 153 (applications to convert very long leasehold to freehold, where no rent has been paid or demanded for a long period of time).

The act followed a series of land law and policy reforms that had been begun by the Liberal government starting in 1906. This is how one American legal scholar, Morris Raphael Cohen, described it:

That which was hidden from Maitland, Joshua Williams, and the other great ones, was revealed to a Welsh solicitor who in the budget of 1910 proposed to tax the land so as to force it on the market. The radically revolutionary character of this proposal was at once recognized in England. It was bitterly fought by all those who treasured what had remained of the old English aristocratic rule. When this budget finally passed, the basis of the old real property law and the effective power of the House of Lords was gone. (Note: The Parliament Act 1911 was introduced to reduce the ability of the House of Lords to block legislation, in order to allow these budget measures to pass.) The legislation of 1925–26 was thus a final completion in the realm of private law of the revolution that was fought in 1910 in the forum of public law, i.e., in the field of taxation and the power of the House of Lords.

== Provisions ==
Councils can use the act to enforce a sale of a property.

=== Part I – General principles as to legal estates, equitable interests and powers ===
Section 1 sets out the basic structure of the newly reformed legal estates—"an estate in fee simple absolute in possession" (commonly referred to as freehold), and "a term of years absolute" (leasehold). Old estates in land—fee tail and life interests—are converted by s.1 so as to "take effect as equitable interests". Section 3 sets out how these equitable interests have effect.

=== Part II – Contracts, conveyances and other instruments ===
Section 70 of the 1925 Act should be considered in conjunction with schedules 1 and 3 when considering interests that override, most notably that to be in receipts of rents and profits is no longer an overriding interest.

Sections 78 and 79 concern covenants relating to land: section 78 relates to their benefit, and section 79 relates to the burdens or obligations which a covenant imposes on the covenantor, their successors in title and persons subsequently deriving title under them.

Section 84 of the act sets out the powers of an appointed authority to alter or remove restrictive covenants on property deeds. This power was later transferred to the Lands Tribunal by the Law of Property Act 1969, and subsequently to the Upper Tribunal by the Transfer of Tribunal Functions (Lands Tribunal and Miscellaneous Amendments) Order 2009.

=== Part IV – Equitable interests and things in action ===
Section 136 provides for written notice of an assignment of a debt or "thing in action" to a third party.

=== Part V – Leases and tenancies ===
Abolished the last legal statutes relating to copyhold, a successor to the feudal system of villeinage where a tenant was obligated to provide special duties and services to a mesne lord in return for manorial land.

=== Part VIII – Married women and lunatics ===
Section 170 was repealed by the Mental Health Act 1959 (c. 72) Sch. 8 Pt. I.

=== Part IX – Voidable dispositions ===
These sections govern fraud; s.172 was repealed (subject to non-application to then-pending bankruptcies) by the Insolvency Act 1985.

- s.173 Every voluntary disposition of land (the main example is a gift) made with intent to defraud a later buyer is voidable at the instance of that buyer. And no such disposition shall be deemed to have been made with intent to defraud by reason only that a subsequent conveyance for valuable consideration was made, if such subsequent conveyance was made after 28 June 1893.
- s.174 No acquisition made in good faith, without fraud or unfair dealing, of any reversionary (landlord's or future) interest in real or personal property, for money or money's worth, shall be liable to be opened or set aside merely on the ground of under value. In this subsection "reversionary interest" includes an expectancy or possibility. This expressly does not affect the jurisdiction of the court to set aside or modify unconscionable bargains.

=== Part X – Wills and probate ===
- Section 176 says that any tenant in tail of full age can dispose of his entailed land in his will as if he was the absolute owner, unless another statute prevents him from doing so.

=== Part XI – Miscellaneous ===
- Section 184 states that in cases of simultaneous death (where there is no evidence as to who lived longer), the deaths will be assumed to have occurred in order of age, oldest first.
- Section 193 gave individuals access to approximately one third of the total area of common land. This includes large areas of the Lake District.

=== Repealed enactments ===
Section 207 of the act repealed 42 enactments, listed in the seventh schedule to the act.

Citation		Description	Extent of repeal`
27 Hen. 8. c. 10	Statute of Uses	The Statute of Uses	The whole act.
32 Hen. 8. c. 34	Grantees of Reversions Act 1540	Graunties of reversions.	The whole act.
13 Eliz. c. 5.	Fraudulent Conveyances Act 1571	An Acte against fraudulent deedes, giftes, alienations, &c.	The whole act.
27 Eliz. c. 4	Fraudulent Conveyances Act 1584	An Act against covenous and fraudulent conveyances.	The whole act.
29 Car. 2. c. 3	Statute of Frauds	The Statute of Frauds	Sections one, two and three. In section four the words " or " upon any contract or sale " of lands, tenements or hereditaments or any interest in " or concerning them." Sections seven, eight, nine and twenty-four.
4 Will. & Mar. c. 16	Clandestine Mortgages Act 1692	An Act to prevent frauds by clandestine mortgages.	The whole act.
4 & 5 Anne c. 3 (Note: This is the citation in The Statutes of the Realm.)	Administration of Justice Act 1705	An Act for the amendment of the law and the better Advancement of Justice.	Sections nine and ten.
4 Geo. 2. c. 28	Landlord and Tenant Act 1730	The Landlord and Tenant Act, 1730.	Section six.
11 Geo. 2. c. 19.	Distress for Rent Act 1737	The Distress for Rent Act, 1737.	Section eleven.
39 & 40 Geo. 3. c. 98	Accumulations Act 1800	The Accumulations Act, 1800.	The whole act.
11 Geo. 4. & 1 Will. 4. c. 46	Illusory Appointments Act 1830	The Elusory Appointments Act, 1830.	The whole act.
3 & 4 Will. 4. c. 74	Fines and Recoveries Act 1833	The Fines and Recovery Act, 1833.	Section thirty-two as respects settlements made or coming; into operation after the commencement of this Act.
1 & 2 Vict. c. 110	Judgments Act 1838	The Judgments Act, 1838.	Section thirteen.
8 & 9 Vict. c. 106	Real Property Act 1845	The Real Property Act, 1845.	Sections two, three, four, five, six, seven and nine.
8 & 9 Vict. c 112	Satisfied Terms Act 1845	The Satisfied Terms Act, 1845.	The whole act.
12 & 13 Vict. c. 26	Leases Act 1849	The Leases Act, 1849	The whole act.
12 & 13 Vict. c. 110	Lease Act 1849	An Act for suspending until the first day of June one thousand eight hundred and fifty, the operation of an Act passed this Session intituled an Act for granting relief against defects in leases under powers of leasing in certain cases.	The whole act.
13 & 14 Vict. c. 17	Leases Act 1850	The Leases Act, 1850.	The whole act.
15 & 16 Vict. c. 76	Common Law Procedure Act 1852	The Common Law Procedure Act, 1852.	Section two hundred and nine.
17 & 18 Vict. c. 97	Inclosure Act 1854	The Inclosure Act, 1854.	The proviso to section eleven, and in section thirteen the words " so far as the same has " been apportioned upon the " lands of persons interested " and making applications as " aforesaid. "
18 & 19 Vict. c. 15		The Judgments Act, 1855.	In section eleven the words " nor " shall any such judgment, " decree, order, or rule, or the " money thereby secured be a " charge upon such lands tenements or hereditaments so " vested in purchasers or " mortgagees."
22 & 23 Vict. c. 35	Law of Property Amendment Act 1859	The Law of Property Amendment Act, 1859.	Sections one, two, three, ten, eleven, twelve, twenty-one and twenty-four.
23 & 24 Vict. c. 38	Law of Property Amendment Act 1860	The Law of Property Amendment Act, 1860.	Sections six and eight.
31 & 32 Vict. c. 4	Sales of Reversions Act 1867	The Sales of Reversions Act, 1867.	The whole act.
31 & 32 Vict. c. 40	Partition Act 1868	The Partition Act, 1868.	The whole act without prejudice to proceedings commenced thereunder before the commencement of this Act.
34 & 35 Vict. c. 31	Trade Union Act 1871	The Trade Union Act, 1871.	In section seven the words " not " exceeding one acre."
36 & 37 Vict. c. 66	Supreme Court of Judicature Act 1873	The Supreme Court of Judicature Act, 1873.	Subsections (3) to (7) of section twenty-five.
37 & 38 Vict. c. 37	Powers of Appointment Act 1874	The Powers of Appointment Act, 1874.	The whole act.
37 & 38 Vict. c. 78	Vendor and Purchaser Act 1874	The Vendor and Purchaser Act, 1874.	The whole act.
39 & 40 Vict. c. 17	Partition Act 1876	The Partition Act, 1876.	The whole act without prejudice to proceedings commenced thereunder before the commencement of this Act.
44 & 45 Vict. c. 41	Conveyancing Act 1881	The Conveyancing Act, 1881.	The whole act, except section thirty so far as it relates to deaths occurring before the commencement of this Act, and except sections forty-two and forty-three so far as those sections relate to instruments coming into operation before the commencement of this Act and except section two and except section forty-eight.
45 & 46 Vict. c. 39	Conveyancing Act 1882	The Conveyancing Act, 1882.	The whole act.
55 & 56 Vict. c. 13	Conveyancing and Law of Property Act 1892	The Conveyancing and Law of Property Act, 1892.	The whole act.
55 & 56 Vict. c. 58	Accumulations Act 1892	The Accumulations Act, 1892.	The whole act.
56 & 57 Vict. c. 21	Voluntary Conveyances Act 1893	The Voluntary Conveyances Act, 1893.	The whole act.
56 & 57 Vict. c. 53	Trustee Act 1893	The Trustee Act, 1893	Section forty-four.
57 Vict. c. 10	Trustee Act 1893, Amendment Act 1894	The Trustee Act, 1893, Amendment Act, 1894.	Section three.
63 & 64 Vict. c. 26	Land Charges Act 1900	The Land Charges Act, 1900.	Subsections (1) & (2) of section two.
7 Edw. 7. c. 18	Married Women's Property Act 1907	The Married Women's Property Act, 1907.	Section one.
1 & 2 Geo. 5. c. 37	Conveyancing Act 1911	The Conveyancing Act, 1911.	The whole act except sections eight and fourteen and except section twelve so far as it relates to deaths occurring before the commencement of this Act.
12 & 13 Geo. 5. c. 16	Law of Property Act 1922	The Law of Property Act, 1922.	The whole of Part I. except sections four and ten so far as they relate to settled land, section twelve, section thirteen so far as it relates to settled land, and sections fourteen, sixteen, twenty-six, and subsection (2) of section twenty-eight. The whole of Part III. except subsection (4) of section eighty-three; sections eighty-six and eighty-eight. Subsection (3) of section one hundred and thirteen. Subsection (5) of section one hundred and twenty-three. Subsection (10) of section one hundred and thirty-eight. Section one hundred and forty six. Section one hundred and fifty-two. Subsection (13) of section one hundred and fifty-six; Last paragraph of subsection (1) of section one hundred and fifty-eight. The First Schedule except as respects Part II. so far as it relates to settled land. The Second Schedule. The Third Schedule except so far as it relates to settled land. The Fourth Schedule. Sub-paragraph (3) of paragraph one of the Fifth Schedule. The Sixth Schedule except paragraphs one and three and sub-paragraphs (1), (3) and the first paragraph of sub-paragraph (4) of paragraph four and sub-paragraphs (2) and (3) of paragraph five. The Eighth Schedule. In the Ninth Schedule, forma Nos. 5, 6, 7 and 9, and No. 8, except so far as it relates to settled land. The Eleventh Schedule. In the Fifteenth Schedule, sub-paragraph (3) of paragraph seven.
15 Geo. 5. c. 5	Law of Property (Amendment) Act 1924	The Law of Property (Amendment) Act, 1924.	Section three and the Third Schedule.

== Subsequent developments ==
Sections 167–170 of the act were repealed by section 1 of, and part III of the schedule to, the Statute Law (Repeals) Act 1969, which came into force on 1 January 1970.

Changes have taken place since the commencement of the Land Registration Act 2002.

== See also ==
- English property law
- English trusts law
- Land Registration Act 1925
- Land Registration Act 2002
- Exchanging contracts

== Bibliography ==
- WT Murphy, T Flessas and S Roberts, Understanding Property Law (4th edn Sweet and Maxwell, London 2003)
- C Harpum, S Bridge and M Dixon, Megarry & Wade: The Law of Real Property (7th edn Sweet and Maxwell 2008)
