= Copyhold Act 1894 =

Act of the Parliament of the United Kingdom

Copyhold Act 1894 (Note: Section 101.)
- Act of Parliament
- Parliament of the United Kingdom
- Long title: An Act to consolidate the Copyhold Acts.
- Citation: 57 & 58 Vict. c. 46
- Territorial extent: England and Wales (Note: Section 99.)

Dates
- Royal assent: 25 August 1894
- Commencement: 25 August 1894 (Note: The Acts of Parliament (Commencement) Act 1793.)
- Repealed: 1 January 1970
Other legislation
Amends	See § Repealed enactments
Repeals/revokes	See § Repealed enactments
Amended by	Law of Property (Amendment) Act 1924; Charities Act 1960
Repealed by	Statute Law (Repeals) Act 1969

Status: Repealed

Text of statute as originally enacted

The Copyhold Act 1894 (57 & 58 Vict. c. 46) was an act of the Parliament of the United Kingdom that consolidated enactments related to the enfranchisement of copyhold land in England and Wales.

== Provisions ==
=== Repealed enactments ===
Section 100 of the act repealed 7 enactments, listed in the third schedule to the act.

Citation	Short title	Extent of repeal
4 & 5 Vict. c. 35	Copyhold Act 1841	The whole act.
6 & 7 Vict. c. 23	Copyhold Act 1843	The whole act.
7 & 8 Vict. c. 55	Copyhold Act 1844	The whole act.
15 & 16 Vict. c. 51	Copyhold Act 1852	The whole act.
21 & 22 Vict. c. 94	Copyhold Act 1858	The whole act.
23 & 24 Vict. c. 59	Universities and College Estates Act Extension Act 1860	Section four.
50 & 51 Vict. c. 73	Copyhold Act 1887	The whole act.

== Subsequent developments ==
The whole act was repealed by section 1 of, and part III of the schedule to, the Statute Law (Repeals) Act 1969, which came into force on 1 January 1970. Section 3 of that act nonetheless preserved, notwithstanding the repeal, the remedies available to the owner of a rentcharge or a certificate of charge created under the act, applying to them the remedies given by section 121 of the Law of Property Act 1925 (15 & 16 Geo. 5. c. 20).
