= Housing, Town Planning, etc. Act 1909 =

Act of the Parliament of the United Kingdom

Housing, Town Planning, etc. Act 1909 (Note: Section 76(1).)
- Act of Parliament
- Parliament of the United Kingdom
- Long title: An Act to amend the Law relating to the Housing of the Working Classes, to provide for the making of Town Planning schemes, and to make further provision with respect to the appointment and duties of County Medical Officers of Health, and to provide for the establishment of Public Health and Housing Committees of County Councils.
- Citation: 9 Edw. 7. c. 44
- Territorial extent: England and Wales; Scotland; (Note: Section 76(2).)

Dates
- Royal assent: 3 December 1909
- Commencement: 3 December 1909 (Note: The Acts of Parliament (Commencement) Act 1793.)
- Repealed: 23 May 1950
Other legislation
Amends	Local Government Act 1888; Housing of the Working Classes Act 1890; Housing of the Working Classes Act 1890 Amendment (Scotland) Act 1896; Housing of the Working Classes Act 1900; Housing of the Working Classes Act 1903
Amended by	Housing, &c. Act 1923; Housing Act 1936
Repealed by	Housing, Town Planning, &c. Act 1919; Housing Act 1925; Housing (Scotland) Act 1925; Town Planning Act 1925; Settled Land Act 1925; Local Government Act 1933; Public Health Act 1936; Public Health (London) Act 1936; Statute Law Revision Act 1950
Relates to	Public Health Act 1875

Status: Repealed

Text of statute as originally enacted

The Housing, Town Planning, etc. Act 1909 (9 Edw. 7. c. 44) was an act of the Parliament of the United Kingdom which prevented the building of "back-to-back" houses. The act also meant local authorities must introduce systems of town planning and meant homes had to be built to certain legal standards.

The act was the first piece of British legislation to use the term 'town planning'.

== Background ==
Town planning as a concept had become more popular in Britain at the turn of the 20th century, drawing on the idea of the garden city and the extensions of existing towns occurring in Germany at the time. The need for legislation on the subject was prompted by a housing reform movement that had emerged from the debates around poverty and social conditions during the Boer War as well as a decline in house building from 1904.

== Passage ==
The bill had its first reading in March 1908. It was generally welcomed but remained in the committee stage for 23 days, until near the end of the parliamentary session. It ended up being withdrawn and resubmitted at the beginning of the next session and considered by a Committee of the Whole House to speed up procedures. The new bill's second reading was in April 1909 and when it got to its committee stage, over 360 amendments were proposed.

The bill moved to the House of Lords in September 1909 where it was notably attacked by Earl Cawdor while the Archbishop of Canterbury and the Bishop of Birmingham supported it. It passed back to the House of Commons in November before being returned and passed by the Lords, a week before the Liberal government collapsed over the People's Budget.

== Responses ==
Politicians of all parties were sympathetic to the idea of town planning, but curtailing private interests with municipal power was seen as too radical to many and meant the legislation was weaker than planning campaigners had hoped. In September 1909, The Builder called the legislation "a strong Bill drawn up by a strong man who wants something done".

== Legacy ==
The act has generally been seen both as a pioneering first step and as a disappointment to its drafters and to contemporary campaigners. On one hand, it is noted as an important basis for later legislation. At the same time, the act is criticised as being "virtually inoperative" until the Housing, Town Planning, &c. Act 1919 was passed.

In 1974, the 65th anniversary of the legislation was marked with a special issue of Planning, the journal of the Royal Town Planning Institute.

== Subsequent developments ==
The whole act, so far as unrepealed, was repealed by section 1(1) of, and the first schedule to, the Statute Law Revision Act 1950 (14 Geo. 6. c. 6), which came into force on 23 May 1950.

== See also ==
- Liberal reforms
- New towns movement
- Town and country planning in the United Kingdom

== Bibliography ==
- Full text
- Handbook to the Housing and Town Planning Act, 1909 by W. Thompson.
- Housing, town planning, etc., act, 1909, a practical + guide, by E.G. Bentley, LL.B., and S. Pointon Taylorwith a foreword by Raymond Unwin, 1911.
- Housing and Town Planning in Great Britain, including the Housing, Town Planning Act, by http://codesproject.asu.edu/node/90, 191o
