= Town Planning (Scotland) Act 1925 =

Act of the Parliament of the United Kingdom

Town Planning (Scotland) Act 1925 (Note: Section 22(1).)
- Act of Parliament
- Parliament of the United Kingdom
- Long title: An Act to consolidate the enactments relating to town planning in Scotland.
- Citation: 15 & 16 Geo. 5. c. 17
- Territorial extent: Scotland (Note: Section 22(3).)

Dates
- Royal assent: 9 April 1925
- Commencement: 1 July 1925 (Note: Section 22(2).)
- Repealed: 1 April 1933
Other legislation
Amends	See § Repealed enactments
Repeals/revokes	See § Repealed enactments
Repealed by	Town and Country Planning (Scotland) Act 1932
Relates to	Housing Act 1925; Housing (Scotland) Act 1925; Town Planning Act 1925; Settled Land Act 1925; Trustee Act 1925; Law of Property Act 1925; Land Registration Act 1925; Land Charges Act 1925; Administration of Estates Act 1925; Universities and College Estates Act 1925; Supreme Court of Judicature (Consolidation) Act 1925; Workmen's Compensation Act 1925

Status: Repealed

Text of statute as originally enacted

The Town Planning (Scotland) Act 1925 (15 & 16 Geo. 5. c. 17) was an act of the Parliament of the United Kingdom that consolidated enactments relating to town planning in Scotland.

The Town Planning Act 1925 (15 & 16 Geo. 5. c. 16) made similar provisions for England and Wales.

== Provisions ==
=== Repealed enactments ===
Section 21 of the act repealed 5 enactments, listed in the fourth schedule to the act, as far as they related to Scotland.

Citation	Short title	Extent of repeal
9 Edw. 7. c. 44	Housing, Town Planning, &c. Act 1909	Part II. Part IV. so far as it relates to town planning. The Fourth Schedule. The Fifth Schedule.
9 & 10 Geo. 5. c. 60	Housing, Town Planning, etc. (Scotland) Act 1919	Part II. The Third Schedule.
9 & 10 Geo. 5. c. 99	Housing (Additional Powers) Act 1919	Section ten.
10 & 11 Geo. 5. c. 71	Housing (Scotland) Act 1920	Section eight, so far as it relates to section ten of the Housing (Additional Powers) Act 1919.
13 & 14 Geo. 5. c. 24	Housing, &c. Act 1923	Part II. Subsection (2), so far as it relates to Part II. of the Act, and subsection (13) of section twenty-three. The Second Schedule so far as it amends section 59 of the Housing, Town Planning, &c. Act 1909.

== Subsequent developments ==
The whole act was repealed by section 53 of, and the fifth schedule to, the Town and Country Planning (Scotland) Act 1932 (22 & 23 Geo. 5. c. 49), which came into operation on 1 April 1933.
