= Trusts of Land and Appointment of Trustees Act 1996 =

Act of the Parliament of the United Kingdom

Trusts of Land and Appointment of Trustees Act 1996 (Note: Section 27(1).)
- Act of Parliament
- Parliament of the United Kingdom
- Long title: An Act to make new provision about trusts of land including provision phasing out the Settled Land Act 1925, abolishing the doctrine of conversion and otherwise amending the law about trusts for sale of land; to amend the law about the appointment and retirement of trustees of any trust; and for connected purposes.
- Citation: 1996 c. 47
- Territorial extent: England and Wales (Note: Section 27(3).)

Dates
- Royal assent: 24 July 1996
- Commencement: 1 January 1997 (Note: Section 37(2). The Trusts of Land and Appointment of Trustees Act 1996 (Commencement) Order 1996 (SI 1996/2974).)
Other legislation
Amends	Trustee Act 1925; Administration of Estates Act 1925; Landlord and Tenant Act 1927; Legitimacy Act 1976; Limitation Act 1980; County Courts Act 1984; Inheritance Tax Act 1984; Family Law Reform Act 1987; Town and Country Planning Act 1990
Amended by	Land Registration Act 2002; Commonhold and Leasehold Reform Act 2002; Mental Capacity Act 2005; Charities Act 2011

Status: Amended

Text of statute as originally enacted

Revised text of statute as amended

Text of the Trusts of Land and Appointment of Trustees Act 1996 as in force today (including any amendments) within the United Kingdom, from legislation.gov.uk.

The Trusts of Land and Appointment of Trustees Act 1996 (c. 47), usually called "TLATA" or "TOLATA", is an act of the Parliament of the United Kingdom, which altered the law in relation to trusts of land in England and Wales.

== Background ==
The act came into force on 1 January 1997 and was a result of a recognised need for reform of the part of the Law of Property Act 1925 which dealt with trusts. It also implemented recommendations made in a number of Law Commission reports. Some problems included the fact that it was hard to establish a trust without it coming under the auspices of the Settled Land Act 1925, which brought with it a range of problems. In particular, the co-owners of property were regarded as having beneficial interests in money and not in the land. Problems arose where partners disagreed over when they wanted to sell a property – usually in the case of separation, and this led to situations where spouses and children might find themselves without their customary home inequitably.

One of the key features of the act is to try to redress this by the imposition of statutory considerations to be taken into account when dealing with the disposition of trusts and ordering a sale of a family home.

== Provisions ==
The act consists of three parts: Part I deals with the handling of trusts in land, Part II deals with the appointment of trustees, and Part III contains definitions, interpretation provisions and miscellany.

=== Part I: Trusts of Land ===
Notable requirements come from two parts of the legislation, sections 14 and 15, where the considerations for determining applications are dealt with. Secondly, the imposition of section 335a in the Insolvency Act 1986.

Section 15

1. The matters to which the court is to have regard in determining an application for an order under section 14 include –
  1. the intentions of the person or persons (if any) who created the trust,
  2. the purposes for which the property subject to the trust is held,
  3. the welfare of any minor who occupies or might reasonably be expected to occupy any land subject to the trust as his home, and
  4. the interest of any secured creditor of any beneficiary.

Insolvency Act 1986, S. 335a

(3) Where such an application is made after the end of the period of one year beginning with the first vesting under chapter IV of this part of the bankrupt's estate in a trustee, the court shall assume, unless the circumstances of the case are exceptional, that the interests of the bankrupt's creditors outweigh all other considerations.

=== Part II: Appointment of trustees ===
Section 19 of the Act allows beneficiaries of a trust (who are all "of full age and capacity") to appoint new trustees or remove or replace existing trustees except when a trust instrument does not contain any provision for appointing trustees. This statutory provision mirrors the existing common law rule in Saunders v Vautier allowing a beneficiary to wind up a trust. This provision reverses the decision in Re Brockbank—under that ruling, beneficiaries could achieve the same result as they can under Section 19 by terminating the trust under the Vautier rule, then creating a new trust (although this may come with both bureaucratic complexity and undesirable tax consequences).

Section 20 sets out a procedure for replacing a trustee who lacks capacity under the Mental Capacity Act 2005. These provisions are necessary as a trustee lacking mental capacity would not be able to retire from his role as trustee under s39 of the Trustee Act 1925 as they lack the capacity to retire, and situations may arise where the only remaining trustee loses mental capacity.

=== Repealed enactments ===
Section 25(2) of the act repealed 43 enactments, listed in schedule 4 to the act.

Enactments repealed by section 25(2)
Citation	Short title	Extent of repeal
3 & 4 Will. 4. c. 74	Fines and Recoveries Act 1833	In section 1, the words ", and any undivided share thereof", in both places.
7 Will. 4 & 1 Vict. c. 26	Wills Act 1837	In section 1, the words "and to any undivided share thereof,".
7 Will. 4 & 1 Vict. c. 26	Wills Act 1837	Section 32.
53 & 54 Vict. c. 39	Partnership Act 1890	Section 22.
12 & 13 Geo. 5. c. 16	Law of Property Act 1922	In section 188— in subsection (1), the words "but not an undivided share in land;" and the words "but not an undivided share thereof", and subsection (30).
15 & 16 Geo. 5. c. 18	Settled Land Act 1925	Section 27.
15 & 16 Geo. 5. c. 18	Settled Land Act 1925	Section 29.
15 & 16 Geo. 5. c. 19	Trustee Act 1925	In section 10(2)— in the first paragraph, the words "by trustees or" and the words "the trustees, or", and in the second paragraph, the words from the beginning to "mortgage; and".
15 & 16 Geo. 5. c. 19	Trustee Act 1925	In section 19(1), the words "building or", in the second place.
15 & 16 Geo. 5. c. 19	Trustee Act 1925	In section 68— in subsection (6), the words ", but not an undivided share in land" and the words ", but not an undivided share thereof", and in subsection (19), the word "binding", the words ", and with or without power at discretion to postpone the sale" and the definition of "trustees for sale".
15 & 16 Geo. 5. c. 20	Law of Property Act 1925	In section 3— subsections (1)(b) and (2), and in subsection (5), the words "trustees for sale or other".
15 & 16 Geo. 5. c. 20	Law of Property Act 1925	In section 7(3), the second paragraph.
15 & 16 Geo. 5. c. 20	Law of Property Act 1925	In section 18— in subsection (1), the words from ", and personal estate" to "payable", in the second place, and the words "or is capable of being", and in subsection (2), the words "of the settlement or the trustees for sale", in both places.
15 & 16 Geo. 5. c. 20	Law of Property Act 1925	Section 19.
15 & 16 Geo. 5. c. 20	Law of Property Act 1925	Section 23 (and the heading immediately preceding it).
15 & 16 Geo. 5. c. 20	Law of Property Act 1925	Sections 25 and 26.
15 & 16 Geo. 5. c. 20	Law of Property Act 1925	Sections 28 to 30.
15 & 16 Geo. 5. c. 20	Law of Property Act 1925	Section 31(3).
15 & 16 Geo. 5. c. 20	Law of Property Act 1925	Section 32.
15 & 16 Geo. 5. c. 20	Law of Property Act 1925	In section 34— in subsection (3), the words from "the trustees (if any)" to "then to" and the words "in each case", and subsection (4).
15 & 16 Geo. 5. c. 20	Law of Property Act 1925	Section 35.
15 & 16 Geo. 5. c. 20	Law of Property Act 1925	Section 42(6).
15 & 16 Geo. 5. c. 20	Law of Property Act 1925	In section 60, paragraphs (b) and (c) of the proviso to subsection (4).
15 & 16 Geo. 5. c. 20	Law of Property Act 1925	In section 130, subsections (1) to (3) and (6) (and the words "Creation of" in the sidenote).
15 & 16 Geo. 5. c. 20	Law of Property Act 1925	Section 201(3).
15 & 16 Geo. 5. c. 20	Law of Property Act 1925	In section 205(1)— in paragraph (ix), the words "but not an undivided share in land;" and the words "but not an undivided share thereof", in paragraph (x), the words "or in the proceeds of sale thereof", and in paragraph (xxix), the word "binding", the words ", and with or without a power at discretion to postpone the sale" and the words "and "power"" onwards.
15 & 16 Geo. 5. c. 21	Land Registration Act 1925	In section 3— in paragraph (viii), the words "but not an undivided share in land;", in paragraph (xi), the words "or in the proceeds of sale thereof", in paragraph (xiv), the words ", but not an undivided share thereof", and paragraphs (xxviii) and (xxix).
15 & 16 Geo. 5. c. 23	Administration of Estates Act 1925	In section 3(1)(ii), the words "money to arise under a trust for sale of land, nor".
15 & 16 Geo. 5. c. 23	Administration of Estates Act 1925	In section 39(1)(i), the words from ", and such power" to "legal mortgage".
15 & 16 Geo. 5. c. 23	Administration of Estates Act 1925	In section 51— in subsection (3), the word "settled", and subsection (4).
15 & 16 Geo. 5. c. 23	Administration of Estates Act 1925	In section 55(1)— in paragraph (vii), the words "or in the proceeds of sale thereof", in paragraph (xxiv), the word ""land"", and paragraph (xxvii).
15 & 16 Geo. 5. c. 24	Universities and College Estates Act 1925	In section 43(iv), the words ", but not an undivided share in land".
16 & 17 Geo. 5. c. 11	Law of Property (Amendment) Act 1926	In the Schedule, the entries relating to section 3 of the Settled Land Act 1925 and sections 26, 28 and 35 of the Law of Property Act 1925.
17 & 18 Geo. 5. c. 36	Landlord and Tenant Act 1927	In section 13— in subsection (1), the words from "(either" to "Property Act, 1925)", in subsection (2), the words ", trustee for sale, or personal representative", and in subsection (3), the words ", and "settled land"" onwards.
22 & 23 Geo. 5. c. 27	Law of Property (Entailed Interests) Act 1932	Section 1.
2 & 3 Geo. 6. c. 72	Landlord and Tenant (War Damage) Act 1939	Section 3(c).
9 & 10 Geo. 6. c. 73	Hill Farming Act 1946	Section 11(2).
12 & 13 Geo. 6. c. 74	Coast Protection Act 1949	In section 11(2)(a)— the words ", by that section as applied by section twenty-eight of the Law of Property Act, 1925, in relation to trusts for sale,", and the words ", by that section as applied as aforesaid,".
2 & 3 Eliz. 2. c. 56	Landlord and Tenant Act 1954	In the Second Schedule, in paragraph 6— the words ", by that section as applied by section twenty-eight of the Law of Property Act, 1925, in relation to trusts for sale,", and the words ", by that section as applied as aforesaid,".
7 & 8 Eliz. 2. c. 72	Mental Health Act 1959	In Schedule 7, in Part I, the entries relating to sections 26 and 28 of the Law of Property Act 1925.
1964 No. 2	Incumbents and Churchwardens (Trusts) Measure 1964	In section 1, in the definition of "land", the words "nor an undivided share in land".
1967 c. 10	Forestry Act 1967	In Schedule 2, paragraph 1(4).
1967 c. 88	Leasehold Reform Act 1967	In section 6(5)— the words ", or by that section as applied by section 28 of the Law of Property Act 1925 in relation to trusts for sale,", the words "or by that section as applied as aforesaid", and the words "or by trustees for sale".
1967 c. 88	Leasehold Reform Act 1967	In Schedule 2, in paragraph 9(1)— the words ", or by that section as applied by section 28 of the Law of Property Act 1925 in relation to trusts for sale", and the words "or by that section as applied as aforesaid".
1969 c. 10	Mines and Quarries (Tips) Act 1969	In section 32(2)(a) and (b), the words ", by that section as applied by section 28 of the Law of Property Act 1925 in relation to trusts for sale".
1970 c. 40	Agriculture Act 1970	In section 30— in subsection (1), the words "(including those provisions as extended to trusts for sale by section 28 of the Law of Property Act 1925)", and in subsection (2), the words "the words from "(including those provisions" to "Law of Property Act 1925)" and".
1972 c. 61	Land Charges Act 1972	In section 17(1), the definition of "trust for sale".
1976 c. 31	Legitimacy Act 1976	Section 10(4).
1976 c. 36	Adoption Act 1976	Section 46(5).
1977 c. 42	Rent Act 1977	In Schedule 2, in Part I, in paragraph 2(b), the words "or, if it is held on trust for sale, the proceeds of its sale are".
1980 c. 58	Limitation Act 1980	In section 18— in subsection (1), the words ", including interests in the proceeds of the sale of land held upon trust for sale,", and in subsections (3) and (4), the words "(including a trust for sale)" and the words "or in the proceeds of sale".
1980 c. 58	Limitation Act 1980	In section 38(1)— in the definition of "land", the words ", including an interest in the proceeds of the sale of land held upon trust for sale,", and the definition of "trust for sale".
1980 c. 58	Limitation Act 1980	In Schedule 1, in Part I, in paragraph 9— the words "or in the proceeds of sale", the words "or the proceeds", and the words "or the proceeds of sale".
1981 c. 54	Supreme Court Act 1981	In section 128, in the definition of "real estate", in paragraph (b), the words "money to arise under a trust for sale of land, nor".
1983 c. 41	Health and Social Services and Social Security Adjudications Act 1983	Section 22(3).
1984 c. 28	County Courts Act 1984	In Schedule 2, in Part II, in paragraph 2— in sub-paragraph (1), the entry relating to section 30 of the Law of Property Act 1925, sub-paragraph (2), and in sub-paragraph (3), "30(2),".
1984 c. 51	Inheritance Tax Act 1984	In section 237(3), the words "and undivided shares in land held on trust for sale, whether statutory or not,".
1986 c. 5	Agricultural Holdings Act 1986	In section 89(1), the words "or the Law of Property Act 1925".
1986 c. 45	Insolvency Act 1986	In section 336— subsection (3), and in subsection (4), the words "or (3)" and the words "or section 30 of the Act of 1925".
1988 c. 50	Housing Act 1988	In Schedule 1, in Part III, in paragraph 18(1)(b), the words "or, if it is held on trust for sale, the proceeds of its sale are".
1989 c. 34	Law of Property (Miscellaneous Provisions) Act 1989	In sections 1(6) and 2(6), the words "or in or over the proceeds of sale of land".
1990 c. 8	Town and Country Planning Act 1990	In section 328— in subsection (1)(a), the words "and by that section as applied by section 28 of the Law of Property Act 1925 in relation to trusts for sale", and in subsection (2)(a), the words "and by that section as so applied".
1991 c. 31	Finance Act 1991	Section 110(5)(b).
1993 c. 10	Charities Act 1993	Section 37(6).
1993 c. 10	Charities Act 1993	Section 39(5).
1993 c. 28	Leasehold Reform, Housing and Urban Development Act 1993	In section 93A(4)— the words ", or by that section as applied by section 28 of the Law of Property Act 1925 in relation to trusts for sale", the words ", or by that section as so applied,", and the words "or by trustees for sale".
1993 c. 28	Leasehold Reform, Housing and Urban Development Act 1993	In Schedule 2, paragraph 5(2)(b) and the word "and" immediately preceding it.
1994 c. 36	Law of Property (Miscellaneous Provisions) Act 1994	In section 16— subsection (2), and in subsection (3), the words "; and subsection (2)" onwards.
1995 c. 8	Agricultural Tenancies Act 1995	In section 33— in subsections (1) and (2), the words from "(either" to "Property Act 1925)", and in subsection (4), the definition of "settled land" and the word "and" immediately preceding it.
1996 c. 53	Housing Grants, Construction and Regeneration Act 1996	Section 55(4)(b).
1996 c. 53	Housing Grants, Construction and Regeneration Act 1996	Section 73(3)(b).
1996 c. 53	Housing Grants, Construction and Regeneration Act 1996	In section 98(2)(a), the words "or to the proceeds of sale of the dwelling".

== Case law ==
In 2001, in the case of Re Shaire, Neuberger J assessed the requirements of TLATA in the light of the case before him and stated that the statute had intended "to tip the balance somewhat more in favour of families and against banks and other charges", when assessing a claim.

== See also ==
- English land law
- English trusts law
