= Housing (Scotland) Act 1925 =

Act of the Parliament of the United Kingdom

Housing (Scotland) Act 1925 (Note: Section 121(1).)
- Act of Parliament
- Parliament of the United Kingdom
- Long title: An Act to consolidate the enactments relating to the Housing of the Working Classes in Scotland.
- Citation: 15 & 16 Geo. 5. c. 15
- Territorial extent: Scotland (Note: Section 121(3).)

Dates
- Royal assent: 9 April 1925
- Commencement: 1 July 1925 (Note: Section 121(2).)
- Repealed: 1 January 1951
Other legislation
Amends	See § Repealed enactments
Repeals/revokes	See § Repealed enactments
Amended by	Housing (Scotland) Act 1930; Public Works Loans (No. 2) Act 1946; Local Government (Scotland) Act 1947
Repealed by	Housing (Scotland) Act 1950
Relates to	Housing Act 1925; Town Planning Act 1925; Town Planning (Scotland) Act 1925; Settled Land Act 1925; Trustee Act 1925; Law of Property Act 1925; Land Registration Act 1925; Land Charges Act 1925; Administration of Estates Act 1925; Universities and College Estates Act 1925; Supreme Court of Judicature (Consolidation) Act 1925; Workmen's Compensation Act 1925

Status: Repealed

Text of statute as originally enacted

The Housing (Scotland) Act 1925 (15 & 16 Geo. 5. c. 15) was an act of the Parliament of the United Kingdom that consolidated enactments relating to the housing of the working classes in Scotland.

The Housing Act 1925 (15 & 16 Geo. 5. c. 14) made similar provisions for England and Wales.

== Provisions ==
=== Repealed enactments ===
Section 120 of the act repealed 17 enactments, listed in the sixth schedule to the act, as far as they related to Scotland.

Citation	Short title	Extent of repeal
44 & 45 Vict. c. 38	Public Works Loans Act 1881	Section eleven.
53 & 54 Vict. c. 70	Housing of the Working Classes Act 1890	The whole act, so far as unrepealed.
57 & 58 Vict. c. 58	Local Government (Scotland) Act 1894	Subsection (6) of section twenty-four.
57 & 58 Vict. c. 55	Housing of the Working Classes Act 1894	The whole act.
63 & 64 Vict. c. 59	Housing of the Working Classes Act 1900	The whole act, so far as unrepealed.
3 Edw. 7. c. 39	Housing of the Working Classes Act 1903	The whole act, so far as unrepealed.
9 Edw. 7. c. 44	Housing, Town Planning, &c. Act 1909	Part I. Part IV., except so far as it relates to town planning. First Schedule (except so far as applied by any enactment other than an enactment repealed by this act) and Second, Third and Sixth Schedules.
4 & 5 Geo. 5. c. 33	Public Works Loans Act 1914	Section four.
9 & 10 Geo. 5. c. 60	Housing, Town Planning, etc. (Scotland) Act 1919	Part I., except sections five, seven, sixteen, twenty, twenty-two, and twenty-three, and section thirty-one, so far as required for the interpretation of the unrepealed provisions of the Act. Sections forty-one, forty-two, forty-four, forty-five and forty-nine. First, Second and Fourth Schedules.
9 & 10 Geo. 5. c. 67	Acquisition of Land (Assessment of Compensation) Act 1919	In section seven the words "for the purposes of Part I. or Part II. of the Housing of the Working Classes Act 1890, or" and the words from "and the provisions of the Second Schedule" to the end of subsection (1).
9 & 10 Geo. 5. c. 99	Housing (Additional Powers) Act 1919	The whole act, except sections eight, ten and fifteen and sections eleven and thirteen so far as they relate to the unrepealed provisions of the Act.
10 & 11 Geo. 5. c. 71	Housing (Scotland) Act 1920	The whole act, except sections seven and nine, and section eight so far as it amends section ten of the Housing (Additional Powers) Act 1919.
10 & 11 Geo. 5. c. 76	Agriculture Act 1920	Section thirty-two.
11 & 12 Geo. 5. c. 33	Housing (Scotland) Act 1921	The whole act.
12 & 13 Geo. 5. c. 33	Public Works Loans Act 1922	Section four.
13 & 14 Geo. 5. c. 24	Housing, &c. Act 1923	Sections five, seven to thirteen, fifteen, and seventeen. Subsections (1), (2) and (3) (except so far as they relate to the unrepealed provisions of the Act) and subsections (4), (8) to (12), (14), (15) and (17) of section twenty-three. First Schedule. Second Schedule, except so far as it amends section fifty-nine of the Housing, Town Planning, &c. Act 1909.
14 & 15 Geo. 5. c. 35	Housing (Financial Provisions) Act 1924	Section twelve and subsection (3) of section sixteen. The Second Schedule so far as it amends section five of the Housing, &c. Act 1923.

== Subsequent developments ==
The whole act was repealed by section 187 of, and part I of the thirteenth schedule to, the Housing (Scotland) Act 1950 (14 Geo. 6. c. 34), which came into force on 1 January 1951.
