= Land Charges Act 1925 =

Act of the Parliament of the United Kingdom

Land Charges Act 1925 (Note: Section 26(1).)
- Act of Parliament
- Parliament of the United Kingdom
- Long title: An Act to consolidate the enactments relating to the registration of pending actions, annuities, writs, orders, deeds of arrangement and land charges, and to searches.
- Citation: 15 & 16 Geo. 5. c. 22
- Territorial extent: England and Wales (Note: Section 26(3).)

Dates
- Royal assent: 9 April 1925
- Commencement: 1 January 1926 (Note: Section 26(21).)
- Repealed: 1 August 1977 (Note: The Local Land Charges Act 1975 (Commencement) Order 1977.)
Other legislation
Amends	See § Repealed enactments
Repeals/revokes	See § Repealed enactments
Amended by	Matrimonial Homes Act 1967; Courts Act 1971; Land Charges Act 1972
Repealed by	Local Land Charges Act 1975
Relates to	Housing Act 1925; Housing (Scotland) Act 1925; Town Planning Act 1925; Town Planning (Scotland) Act 1925; Settled Land Act 1925; Trustee Act 1925; Law of Property Act 1925; Land Registration Act 1925; Administration of Estates Act 1925; Universities and College Estates Act 1925; Supreme Court of Judicature (Consolidation) Act 1925; Workmen's Compensation Act 1925

Status: Repealed

Text of statute as originally enacted

Revised text of statute as amended

The Land Charges Act 1925 (15 & 16 Geo. 5. c. 22) was an act of the Parliament of the United Kingdom that consolidated enactments related to land ownership and interests in England and Wales.

== Provisions ==
=== Repealed enactments ===
Section 24 of the act repealed 12 enactments, listed in the schedule to the act.

Citation	Short title	Extent of repeal
2 & 3 Vict. c. 11	Judgments Act 1839	Sections four, seven, ten and eleven.
13 & 14 Vict. c. 43	Court of Chancery of Lancaster Act 1850	Section twenty-four.
18 & 19 Vict. c. 15	Judgments Act 1855	Sections three, twelve, thirteen and fourteen.
22 & 23 Vict. c. 35	Law of Property Amendment Act 1859	Section twenty-two.
23 & 24 Vict. c. 115	Crown Debts and Judgments Act 1860	Section two.
30 & 31 Vict. c. 47	Lis Pendens Act 1867	Section two.
45 & 46 Vict. c. 39	Conveyancing Act 1882	Section two.
51 & 52 Vict. c. 51	Land Charges Registration and Searches Act 1888	The whole act.
57 & 58 Vict. c. 16	Supreme Court of Judicature (Procedure) Act 1894	The reference in the Schedule to the Lis Pendens Act, 1867.
63 & 64 Vict. c. 26	Land Charges Act 1900	The whole act.
12 & 13 Geo. 5. c. 16	Law of Property Act 1922	Sections fourteen and sixteen, and the Seventh Schedule.
15 Geo. 5. c. 5	Law of Property (Amendment) Act 1924	Section six, and the Sixth Schedule.

== Subsequent developments ==
The whole act was repealed by section 19(1) of, and schedule 1 to, the Local Land Charges Act 1975, which came into force on 1 August 1977.
