= Workmen's Compensation Act 1925 =

Act of the Parliament of the United Kingdom

Workmen's Compensation Act 1925 (Note: Section 51.)
- Act of Parliament
- Parliament of the United Kingdom
- Long title: An Act to consolidate the law relating to compensation to workmen for injuries suffered in the course of their employment.
- Citation: 15 & 16 Geo. 5. c. 84
- Territorial extent: England and Wales; Scotland; (Note: Section 50(4).)

Dates
- Royal assent: 22 December 1925
- Commencement: 1 May 1926 (Note: Section 50(1).)
- Repealed: 5 July 1948

Other legislation
- Amends: See § Repealed enactments
- Repeals/revokes: See § Repealed enactments
- Amended by: Workmen's Compensation (Transfer of Funds) Act 1927; Workmen's Compensation (Supplementary Allowances) Act 1940
- Repealed by: National Insurance (Industrial Injuries) Act 1946; Industrial Injuries and Diseases (Old Cases) Act 1975
- Relates to: Housing Act 1925; Housing (Scotland) Act 1925; Town Planning Act 1925; Town Planning (Scotland) Act 1925; Settled Land Act 1925; Trustee Act 1925; Law of Property Act 1925; Land Registration Act 1925; Land Charges Act 1925; Administration of Estates Act 1925; Universities and College Estates Act 1925; Supreme Court of Judicature (Consolidation) Act 1925

Status: Repealed

Text of statute as originally enacted

The Workmen's Compensation Act 1925 (15 & 16 Geo. 5. c. 84) was an act of the Parliament of the United Kingdom that consolidated enactments related to compensation to workmen for injuries suffered in the course of their employment in Great Britain.

== Provisions ==
=== Repealed enactments ===
Section 50(2) of the act repealed 9 enactments, listed in the fourth schedule to the act.

Citation	Short title	Extent of repeal
6 Edw. 7. c. 58	Workmen's Compensation Act 1906	The whole act.
9 Edw. 7. c. 16	Workmen's Compensation (Anglo-French Convention) Act 1909	The whole act.
1 & 2 Geo. 5. c. 50	Coal Mines Act 1911	Section one hundred and ten.
8 & 9 Geo. 5. c. 8	Workmen's Compensation (Illegal Employment) Act 1918	The whole act.
8 & 9 Geo. 5. c. 14	Workmen's Compensation (Silicosis) Act 1918	The whole act.
9 & 10 Geo. 5. c. 73	County Courts Act 1919	Sections twenty-five and twenty-six.
13 & 14 Geo. 5. c. 42	Workmen's Compensation Act 1923	The whole act, except sections one, six, twenty-eight, twenty-nine, thirty and thirty-one.
14 & 15 Geo. 5. c. 17	County Courts Act 1924	Section six.
14 & 15 Geo. 5. c. 40	Workmen's Compensation (Silicosis) Act 1924	The whole act.

== Subsequent developments ==
The whole act was repealed by section 89(1) of, and the ninth schedule to, the National Insurance (Industrial Injuries) Act 1946 (9 & 10 Geo. 6. c. 62), which came into force on 5 July 1948.
