= Housing Act 1925 =

Act of the Parliament of the United Kingdom

Housing Act 1925 (Note: Section 137(1).)
- Act of Parliament
- Parliament of the United Kingdom
- Long title: An Act to consolidate the enactments relating to the Housing of the Working Classes in England and Wales.
- Citation: 15 & 16 Geo. 5. c. 14
- Territorial extent: England and Wales (Note: Section 137(3).)

Dates
- Royal assent: 9 April 1925
- Commencement: 1 July 1925 (Note: Section 137(2).)
- Repealed: 1 January 1937
Other legislation
Amends	See § Repealed enactments
Repeals/revokes	See § Repealed enactments
Amended by	Housing Act 1930; Local Government Act 1933; Housing Act 1935
Repealed by	Housing Act 1936
Relates to	Housing (Scotland) Act 1925; Town Planning Act 1925; Town Planning (Scotland) Act 1925; Settled Land Act 1925; Trustee Act 1925; Law of Property Act 1925; Land Charges Act 1925; Universities and College Estates Act 1925; Supreme Court of Judicature (Consolidation) Act 1925; Workmen's Compensation Act 1925

Status: Repealed

Text of statute as originally enacted

The Housing Act 1925 (15 & 16 Geo. 5. c. 14) was an act of the Parliament of the United Kingdom that consolidated enactments relating to the housing of the working classes in England and Wales.

The Housing (Scotland) Act 1925 (15 & 16 Geo. 5. c. 15) made similar provisions for Scotland.

== Provisions ==
=== Repealed enactments ===
Section 136 of the act repealed 18 enactments, listed in the sixth schedule to the act.

Citation	Short title	Extent of repeal
44 & 45 Vict. c. 38	Public Works Loans Act 1881	Section eleven.
53 & 54 Vict. c. 70	Housing of the Working Classes Act 1890	The whole act except subsection (1) of section seventy-four.
53 & 54 Vict. c. ccxliii	London Council (General Powers) Act 1890	Section twenty-five.
56 & 57 Vict. c. 73	Local Government Act 1894	Subsection (2) of section six.
57 & 58 Vict. c. 55	Housing of the Working Classes Act 1894	The whole act.
62 & 63 Vict. c. 14	London Government Act 1899	In Part II of the Second Schedule the words "Power to adopt Part III. of the Housing of the Working Classes Act, 1890," and the words "The power to be only exercised within the borough" where those words secondly occur.
63 & 64 Vict. c. 59	Housing of the Working Classes Act 1900	The whole act, so far as unrepealed.
3 Edw. 7. c. 39	Housing of the Working Classes Act 1903	The whole act.
9 Edw. 7. c. 44	Housing, Town Planning, &c. Act 1909	Part I., except section seven. Subsection (1) of section sixty-nine, and in subsections (2) and (3) of the same section the words "the clerk or" and "clerk or." Part IV. except so far as it relates to town planning. First, Second, and Sixth Schedules.
4 & 5 Geo. 5. c. 33	Public Works Loans Act 1914	Section four.
9 & 10 Geo. 5. c. 35	Housing, Town Planning, &c., Act 1919	Part I., except sections seven, nineteen, twenty-three, twenty-five, thirty-one, and thirty-six, and subsection (4) of section twenty-four and section forty, so far as required for the interpretation of the unrepealed provisions of the Act. First, Second, and Fifth Schedules.
9 & 10 Geo. 5. c. 57	Acquisition of Land (Assessment of Compensation) Act 1919	In section seven the words "for the purposes of Part I. or Part II. of the Housing of the Working Classes Act, 1890 or" and the words from "and the provisions of the Second Schedule" to the end of subsection (1).
9 & 10 Geo. 5. c. 99	Housing (Additional Powers) Act 1919	The whole act except sections eight, nine, ten, eleven and fifteen.
10 & 11 Geo. 5. c. 76	Agriculture Act 1920	Section thirty-two.
11 & 12 Geo. 5. c. 19	Housing Act 1921	Sections two, three, four and nine; section five, except so far as it amends the Small Dwellings Acquisition Act 1899. Section six, except so far as it amends section ten of the Housing (Additional Powers) Act 1919.
12 & 13 Geo. 5. c. 33	Public Works Loans Act 1922	Section four.
13 & 14 Geo. 5. c. 24	Housing, &c. Act 1923	Sections five, seven to fifteen and seventeen. The First Schedule. The Second Schedule, except so far as it amends sections fifty-nine and sixty-nine of the Housing, Town Planning, &c., Acts, 1909.
14 & 15 Geo. 5. c. 35	Housing (Financial Provisions) Act 1924	Section twelve. The Second Schedule, so far as it amends section five of the Housing, &c., Act 1923.

== Subsequent developments ==
The whole act was repealed by section 190 of, and the twelfth schedule to, the Housing Act 1936 (26 Geo. 5 & 1 Edw. 8. c. 51), which came into force on 1 January 1937.
