= List of acts of the Parliament of the United Kingdom from 1860 =

This is a complete list of acts of the Parliament of the United Kingdom for the year 1860.

Note that the first parliament of the United Kingdom was held in 1801; parliaments between 1707 and 1800 were either parliaments of Great Britain or of Ireland). For acts passed up until 1707, see the list of acts of the Parliament of England and the list of acts of the Parliament of Scotland. For acts passed from 1707 to 1800, see the list of acts of the Parliament of Great Britain. See also the list of acts of the Parliament of Ireland.

For acts of the devolved parliaments and assemblies in the United Kingdom, see the list of acts of the Scottish Parliament, the list of acts of the Northern Ireland Assembly, and the list of acts and measures of Senedd Cymru; see also the list of acts of the Parliament of Northern Ireland.

The number shown after each act's title is its chapter number. Acts passed before 1963 are cited using this number, preceded by the year(s) of the reign during which the relevant parliamentary session was held; thus the Union with Ireland Act 1800 is cited as "39 & 40 Geo. 3 c. 67", meaning the 67th act passed during the session that started in the 39th year of the reign of George III and which finished in the 40th year of that reign. Note that the modern convention is to use Arabic numerals in citations (thus "41 Geo. 3" rather than "41 Geo. III"). Acts of the last session of the Parliament of Great Britain and the first session of the Parliament of the United Kingdom are both cited as "41 Geo. 3".

Some of these acts have a short title. Some of these acts have never had a short title. Some of these acts have a short title given to them by later acts, such as by the Short Titles Act 1896.

== 23 & 24 Vict. ==
The second session of the 18th Parliament of the United Kingdom, which met from 24 January 1860 until 29 August 1860.

=== Public general acts ===
Short title	Citation	Royal assent
Long title
Confirmation of Marriages Act 1860 (repealed)	23 & 24 Vict. c. 1	12 March 1860
An Act to render valid certain Marriages in the Chapel of Saint Mary in Rydal in the County of Westmoreland. (Repealed by Statute Law (Repeals) Act 1977 (c. 18))
Consolidated Fund (£407,649) Act 1860 or the Supply Act 1860 (repealed)	23 & 24 Vict. c. 2	12 March 1860
An Act to apply the Sum of Four hundred and seven thousand six hundred and forty-nine Pounds out of the Consolidated Fund to the Service of the Year ending the Thirty-first Day of March One thousand eight hundred and sixty. (Repealed by Statute Law Revision Act 1875 (38 & 39 Vict. c. 66))
Consolidated Fund (£4,500,000) Act 1860 or the Supply (No. 2) Act 1860 (repealed)	23 & 24 Vict. c. 3	23 March 1860
An Act to apply the Sum of Four million five hundred thousand Pounds out of the Consolidated Fund to the Service of the Year One thousand eight hundred and sixty. (Repealed by Statute Law Revision Act 1875 (38 & 39 Vict. c. 66))
Annual Revision of Rateable Property (Ireland) Amendment Act 1860 (repealed)	23 & 24 Vict. c. 4	23 March 1860
An Act to enable the Commissioners of Her Majesty's Treasury to defray One Moiety of the Expense of the annual Revision of the Valuation of Rateable Property in Ireland out of the Consolidated Fund. (Repealed by Rates (Northern Ireland) Order 1972 (SI 1972/1633))
Indian Securities Act 1860 (repealed)	23 & 24 Vict. c. 5	23 March 1860
An Act to regulate Probate and Administration with respect to certain Indian Government Securities; to repeal certain Stamp Duties; and to extend the Operation of the Act of the Twenty-second and Twenty-third Years of Victoria, Chapter Thirty-nine (Note: East India Loan (No. 2) Act 1859 (22 & 23 Vict. c. 39)) to Indian Bonds. (Repealed by Statute Law (Repeals) Act 1986 (c. 12))
Packet Service, Securities Act 1860 (repealed)	23 & 24 Vict. c. 6	23 March 1860
An Act to transfer to the Postmaster General Securities entered into with the Commissioners of the Admiralty in relation to the Packet Service. (Repealed by Statute Law Revision Act 1892 (55 & 56 Vict. c. 19))
Medical Acts Amendment Act 1860 (repealed)	23 & 24 Vict. c. 7	23 March 1860
An Act to amend the Medical Acts. (Repealed by Medical Act 1956 (4 & 5 Eliz. 2. c. 76))
Poison Act 1860 or the Administering of Poison Act 1860 (repealed)	23 & 24 Vict. c. 8	23 March 1860
An Act to amend the Law relating to the unlawful administering of Poison. (Repealed by Statute Law Revision Act 1892 (55 & 56 Vict. c. 19))
Mutiny Act 1860 (repealed)	23 & 24 Vict. c. 9	31 March 1860
An Act for punishing Mutiny and Desertion and for the better Payment of the Army and their Quarters. (Repealed by Statute Law Revision Act 1875 (38 & 39 Vict. c. 66))
Marine Mutiny Act 1860 (repealed)	23 & 24 Vict. c. 10	31 March 1860
An Act for the Regulation of Her Majesty's Royal Marine Forces while on shore. (Repealed by Statute Law Revision Act 1875 (38 & 39 Vict. c. 66))
Endowed Schools Act 1860 (repealed)	23 & 24 Vict. c. 11	31 March 1860
An Act to amend the Law relating to Endowed Schools. (Repealed by Charities Act 1960 (8 & 9 Eliz. 2. c. 58))
Consolidated Fund (£850,000) Act or the Supply (No. 3) Act 1860 (repealed)	23 & 24 Vict. c. 12	31 March 1860
An Act to apply the Sum of Eight hundred and fifty thousand Pounds out of the Consolidated Fund to the Service of the Year ending the Thirty-first Day of March One thousand eight hundred and sixty. (Repealed by Statute Law Revision Act 1875 (38 & 39 Vict. c. 66))
Friendly Societies Act 1860 (repealed)	23 & 24 Vict. c. 13	31 March 1860
An Act to prevent the Members of Benefit Societies from forfeiting their Interest therein by being enrolled in Yeomanry or Volunteer Corps. (Repealed by Friendly Societies Act 1875 (38 & 39 Vict. c. 60))
Income Tax Act 1860 (repealed)	23 & 24 Vict. c. 14	3 April 1860
An Act for granting to Her Majesty Duties on Profits arising from Property, Professions, Trades, and Offices. (Repealed by Income Tax Act 1918 (8 & 9 Geo. 5. c. 40))
Probate Duty Act 1860 (repealed)	23 & 24 Vict. c. 15	3 April 1860
An Act for granting to Her Majesty certain Duties of Stamps. (Repealed by Heritable Securities (Scotland) Act 1860 (23 & 24 Vict. c. 80), Inland Revenue Repeal Act 1870 (33 & 34 Vict. c. 99) and Finance Act 1975 (c. 7))
Municipal Corporation Mortgages, &c. Act 1860 or the Municipal Corporation (Mortgages, &c.) Act 1860 (repealed)	23 & 24 Vict. c. 16	15 May 1860
An Act to make further Provision concerning Mortgages and other Dispositions of Property belonging to Municipal Corporations in England and Ireland. (Repealed for England and Wales by Statute Law Revision Act 1892 (55 & 56 Vict. c. 19) and for Northern Ireland by Local Government Act (Northern Ireland) 1972 (c. 9 (N.I.)))
Annual Inclosure Act 1860 or the Inclosure Act 1860	23 & 24 Vict. c. 17	15 May 1860
An Act to authorize the Inclosure of certain Lands in pursuance of a Report of the Inclosure Commissioners for England and Wales.
Marriage (Society of Friends) Act 1860	23 & 24 Vict. c. 18	15 May 1860
An Act to amend the Acts relating to Marriages in England and Ireland, by extending certain Provisions thereof to Persons professing with the Society of Friends called Quakers. (Repealed for England and Wales by Marriage Act 1949 (12, 13 & 14 Geo. 6. c. 76))
Labourers (Ireland) Act 1860 (repealed)	23 & 24 Vict. c. 19	15 May 1860
An Act to extend the Act (Note: Landed Property Improvement (Ireland) Act 1847 (10 & 11 Vict. c. 32)) to facilitate the Improvement of Landed Property in Ireland, and Acts amending the same, to the Erection Dwellings for the Labouring Classes in Ireland. (Repealed by Statute Law Revision Act 1898 (61 & 62 Vict. c. 22) and Statute Law Revision Act (Northern Ireland) 1954 (c. 35 (N.I.)))
Exchequer Bills Act 1860 (repealed)	23 & 24 Vict. c. 20	15 May 1860
An Act for raising the Sum of Thirteen million two hundred and thirty thousand Pounds by Exchequer Bills for the Service of the Year One thousand eight hundred and sixty. (Repealed by Statute Law Revision Act 1875 (38 & 39 Vict. c. 66))
Pawnbrokers Act 1860 (repealed)	23 & 24 Vict. c. 21	15 May 1860
Act to amend the Act (Note: Pawnbrokers Act 1800 (39 & 40 Geo. 3. c. 99)) for better regulating the Business of Pawnbrokers. (Repealed by Pawnbrokers Act 1872 (35 & 36 Vict. c. 93))
Customs Tariff Amendment Act 1860 or the Customs Act 1860 (repealed)	23 & 24 Vict. c. 22	15 May 1860
An Act to amend the Laws relating to the Customs. (Repealed by Customs Consolidation Act 1876 (39 & 40 Vict. c. 36))
Oxford University Act 1860 (Note: This short title actually belongs to 23 & 24 Vict. c. 91.) (repealed)	23 & 24 Vict. c. 23	25 May 1860
An Act to provide for the Consideration of an Ordinance which has been laid before Parliament in a Report of the Oxford University Commissioners. (Repealed by Statute Law Revision Act 1875 (38 & 39 Vict. c. 66))
Marriage Confirmation Act 1860 (repealed)	23 & 24 Vict. c. 24	25 May 1860
An Act to remove Doubt as to the Validity of certain Marriages in Extra-parochial Places. (Repealed by Marriage Act 1949 (12, 13 & 14 Geo. 6. c. 76))
Consolidated Fund (£9,500,000) Act or the Supply (No. 4) Act 1860 (repealed)	23 & 24 Vict. c. 25	25 May 1860
An Act to apply the Sum of Nine million five hundred thousand Pounds out of the Consolidated Fund to the Service of the Year One thousand eight hundred and sixty. (Repealed by Statute Law Revision Act 1875 (38 & 39 Vict. c. 66))
Common Lodging Houses Act, Ireland, 1860 or the Common Lodging Houses (Ireland) Act 1860 or the Common Lodging Houses Act 1860 (repealed)	23 & 24 Vict. c. 26	25 May 1860
An Act to remove Doubts as to the Application of "The Common Lodging Houses Acts" to Ireland, and to amend the Provisions of the same so far as they relate to Ireland. (Repealed by Public Health (Ireland) Act 1878 (41 & 42 Vict. c. 52))
Refreshment Houses Act 1860	23 & 24 Vict. c. 27	14 June 1860
An Act for granting to Her Majesty certain Duties on Wine Licences and Refreshment Houses, and for regulating the licensing of Refreshment Houses and the granting of Wine Licences.
Repeal of Sir John Barnard's Act 1860 (repealed)	23 & 24 Vict. c. 28	14 June 1860
An Act to repeal the Act of the Seventh Year of King George the Second, Chapter Eight, (Note: Stock Jobbing Act 1733 (7 Geo. 2. c. 8)) commonly called "Sir John Barnard's Act," and the Act of the Tenth Year of King George the Second, Chapter Eight. (Note: Stock Jobbing Act 1736 (10 Geo. 2. c. 8)) (Repealed by Statute Law Revision Act 1875 (38 & 39 Vict. c. 66))
Malicious Injuries to Property Act 1860 (repealed)	23 & 24 Vict. c. 29	14 June 1860
An Act to amend an Act (Note: Malicious Injuries to Property (England) Act 1827 (7 & 8 Geo. 4. c. 30)) relative to malicious Injuries to Property. (Repealed by Criminal Statutes Repeal Act 1861 (24 & 25 Vict. c. 95))
Public Improvements Act 1860 (repealed)	23 & 24 Vict. c. 30	3 July 1860
An Act to enable a Majority of Two Thirds of the Ratepayers of any Parish or District, duly assembled, to rate their District in aid of Public Improvements for general Benefit within their District. (Repealed by Parish Councils Act 1957 (5 & 6 Eliz. 2. c. 42))
Bank of Ireland Act 1860	23 & 24 Vict. c. 31	3 July 1860
An Act to repeal a certain Enactment for restraining the Governor and Company of the Bank of Ireland from lending Money on Mortgage.
Ecclesiastical Courts Jurisdiction Act 1860	23 & 24 Vict. c. 32	3 July 1860
An Act to abolish the Jurisdiction of the Ecclesiastical Courts in Ireland in Cases of Defamation, and in England and Ireland in certain Cases of Brawling.
Bankruptcy (Scotland) Amendment Act 1860 (repealed)	23 & 24 Vict. c. 33	3 July 1860
An Act to amend certain Provisions in the Bankrupt Law of Scotland. (Repealed by Bankruptcy (Scotland) Act 1913 (3 & 4 Geo. 5. c. 20))
Petitions of Right Act 1860 (repealed)	23 & 24 Vict. c. 34	3 July 1860
An Act to amend the law relating to Petitions of Right, to simplify the Proceedings, and to make Provisions for the Costs thereof. (Repealed for England and Wales and Scotland by Crown Proceedings Act 1947 (10 & 11 Geo. 6. c. 44) and for Northern Ireland by Northern Ireland (Crown Proceedings) Order 1949 (SI 1949/1836))
Licensing (Ireland) Act 1860 (repealed)	23 & 24 Vict. c. 35	23 July 1860
An Act further to amend an Act of the Eighteenth Year of Her present Majesty, (Note: Licensing (Ireland) Act 1855 (18 & 19 Vict. c. 62)) to amend the Law for the better Prevention of the Sale of Spirits by unlicensed Persons and for the Suppression of illicit Distillation in Ireland. (Repealed by Licensing Act (Northern Ireland) 1971 (c. 13 (N.I.)))
Customs Inland Bonding Act 1860 or the Customs Act 1860 (repealed)	23 & 24 Vict. c. 36	23 July 1860
An Act to authorize the Appointment and Approval of Places for the warehousing of Goods for the Security of Duties of Customs. (Repealed by Customs Consolidation Act 1876 (39 & 40 Vict. c. 36))
Castle Stewart and Nairn Road Assessment Act 1860 (repealed)	23 & 24 Vict. c. 37	23 July 1860
An Act to levy an Assessment in the County of Inverness to discharge a Debt on the Castle Stewart and Nairn Road in the said County. (Repealed by Statute Law (Repeals) Act 1976 (c. 16))
Law of Property Amendment Act 1860	23 & 24 Vict. c. 38	23 July 1860
An Act to further amend the Law of Property. (Repealed for England and Wales by Law of Property (Amendment) Act 1924 (15 & 16 Geo. 5. c. 5) and Law of Property Act 1925 (15 & 16 Geo. 5. c. 20))
Anstruther Union Harbour Act 1860	23 & 24 Vict. c. 39	23 July 1860
An Act for the Construction of a new Harbour, and the Improvement of the existing Harbour, at Anstruther Easter in the County of Fife.
Indemnity Act 1860 (repealed)	23 & 24 Vict. c. 40	23 July 1860
An Act to indemnify such Persons in the United Kingdom as have omitted to qualify themselves for Offices and Employments, and to extend the Time limited for those Purposes respectively. (Repealed by Promissory Oaths Act 1871 (34 & 35 Vict. c. 48))
Railways and Canals Act 1860 (repealed)	23 & 24 Vict. c. 41	23 July 1860
Act to make perpetual an Act of the Twenty-first and Twenty-second Years of Her present Majesty, (Note: Cheap Trains and Canal Carriers Act 1858 (21 & 22 Vict. c. 75)) to amend the Law relating to Cheap Trains, and to restrain the Exercise of certain Powers by Canal Companies being also Railway Companies. (Repealed by Statute Law Revision Act 1875 (38 & 39 Vict. c. 66))
Phoenix Park Act 1860 or the Dublin, Phoenix Park Act 1860	23 & 24 Vict. c. 42	23 July 1860
An Act to vest the Management of the Phoenix Park in the Commissioners of Public Works in Ireland.
Tenison's Charity Act 1860 (repealed)	23 & 24 Vict. c. 43	23 July 1860
An Act for confirming a Scheme of the Charity Commissioners for the Administration of Archbishop Tenison's Charity in the Parish of Saint Martin in the Fields in the City of Westminster. (Repealed by Statute Law (Repeals) Act 1981 (c. 19))
	Scheme for the Application and Management of the Charity called Archbishop Tenison's School and Library in the Parish of Saint Martin in the Fields, in the County of Middlesex.	
Local Government Supplemental Act 1860	23 & 24 Vict. c. 44	23 July 1860
An Act to confirm certain Provisional Orders under the Local Government Act (1858) (Note: Local Government Act 1858 (21 & 22 Vict. c. 98)) relating to the Districts of Southampton, Leicester, Epsom, Coventry, Ipswich, Fareham, Wells, Tormoham, Scarborough, Ludlow, Banbury, Boston, Penrith, Barnsley, and Shipley; and for other Purposes in relation thereto.
	Provisional Order putting in force the Lands Clauses Consolidation Act, 1845, (Note: Lands Clauses Consolidation Act 1845 (8 & 9 Vict. c. 18)) within the District of the Southampton Local Board of Health, for the Purchase of Land by the said Board.	
	Provisional Order putting in force the Lands Clauses Consolidation Act, 1845, within the District of the Leicester Local Board of Health, in the County of Leicester, for the Purchase of Lands by the said Board for Street Improvements.	
	Provisional Order putting in force the Lands Clauses Consolidation Act, 1845, within the District of the Epsom Local Board of Health, in the County of Surrey, for the Purchase of Lands by the said Board for Deodorizing Works.	
	Provisional Order putting in force the Lands Clauses Consolidation Act, 1845, within the District of the Coventry Local Board of Health, in the County of Warwick, for the Purchase of Lands by the said Board for Street Improvements.	
	Provisional Order putting in force the Lands Clauses Consolidation Act, 1845, within the District of the Ipswich Local Board of Health, for the Purchase of Land by the said Board.	
	Provisional Order putting in force the Lands Clauses Consolidation Act, 1845, within the District of the Fareham Local Board of Health, in the County of Southampton, for the Purchase of Lands by the said Board for Improvements.	
	Provisional Order repealing and altering Parts of a Local Act (Note: Wells (Somerset) Roads and Improvement Act 1821 (1 & 2 Geo. 4. c. xii)) in force within the District of the Wells Local Board.	
	Provisional Order repealing and altering Parts of the Torquay Waterworks Act, 1856, (Note: Torquay Waterworks Act 1856 (19 & 20 Vict. c. lxxviii)) in force within the District of the Tormoham Local Board of Health.	
	Provisional Order repealing and altering Parts of a Local Act (Note: Scarborough Improvement Act 1805 (45 Geo. 3. c. xciv)) in force within the District of the Scarborough Local Board.	
	Provisional Order repealing a Local Act (Note: Ludlow, Salop Improvement Act 1793 (33 Geo. 3. c. 25)) in force within the District of the Ludlow Local Board.	
	Provisional Order for the partial Repeal and Alteration of a Provisional Order applying the Public Health Act, 1848, (Note: Public Health Act 1848 (11 & 12 Vict. c. 63)) to the District of Banbury, and of the First Public Health Supplemental Act, 1852. (Note: First Public Health Supplemental Act 1852 (15 & 16 Vict. c. 42))	
	Provisional Order repealing and altering Parts of Local Acts (Note: Boston (Streets) Act 1776 (16 Geo. 3. c. 25)) (Note: Boston Improvement Act 1792 (32 Geo. 3. c. 80)) (Note: Boston (Lincolnshire) Improvement Act 1806 (46 Geo. 3. c.xl)) (Note: Boston (Lincolnshire) Lighting and Watching Act 1806 (46 Geo. 3. c. xli)) in force within the District of the Boston Local Board.	
	Provisional Order for extending the Borrowing Powers of the Penrith Local Board of Health.	
	Provisional Order for extending the Borrowing Powers of the Barnsley Local Board of Health.	
	Provisional Order for extending the Borrowing Powers of the Shipley Local Board of Health.	
Trout (Scotland) Act 1860 (repealed)	23 & 24 Vict. c. 45	23 July 1860
An Act to extend the Act of the Eighth and Ninth Years of Victoria, Chapter Twenty-six, (Note: Trout (Scotland) Act 1845 (8 & 9 Vict. c. 26)) for preventing fishing for Trout or other Fresh-water Fish by Nets in the Rivers and Waters in Scotland. (Repealed by Salmon and Freshwater Fisheries (Protection) (Scotland) Act 1951 (14 & 15 Geo. 6. c. 26))
Caledonian and Crinan Canals Amendment Act 1860	23 & 24 Vict. c. 46	23 July 1860
An Act to amend and enlarge the Powers and Provisions of the several Acts relating to the Caledonian and Crinan Canals.
Burgesses (Scotland) Act 1860 (repealed)	23 & 24 Vict. c. 47	23 July 1860
An Act to amend the Law relative to the Legal Qualifications of Councillors and the Admission of Burgesses in Royal Burghs in Scotland. (Repealed by Town Councils (Scotland) Act 1900 (63 & 64 Vict. c. 49))
Leith Harbour and Docks Act 1860 (repealed)	23 & 24 Vict. c. 48	23 July 1860
An Act to provide for the Settlement and Discharge of the Debt due to the Commissioners of Her Majesty's Treasury from the Harbour and Docks of Leith. (Repealed by Leith Harbour and Docks Act 1875 (38 & 39 Vict. c. clx) (Note: Incorrectly cited as "38-9 V c cix" in the Chronological Table of the Statutes.))
Colewort Barracks, Portsmouth Act 1860 (repealed)	23 & 24 Vict. c. 49	23 July 1860
An Act for extinguishing certain Rights of Way through Colewort Barracks in the Borough of Portsmouth. (Repealed by Statute Law (Repeals) Act 1993 (c. 50))
Annuity Tax Abolition Act 1860 or the Annuity-tax (Edinburgh and Montrose) Abolition Act 1860 or the Annuity-Tax (Edinburgh and Montrose) Act 1860 or the Annuity Tax Abolition (Edinburgh and Montrose &c.) Act 1860 or the Annuity Tax in Edinburgh and Montrose Act 1860	23 & 24 Vict. c. 50	23 July 1860
An Act to abolish the Annuity Tax in Edinburgh and Montrose, and to make Provision in regard to the Stipends of the Ministers in that City and Burgh, and also to make Provision for the Patronage of the Church of North Leith.
Local Taxation Returns Act 1860 (repealed)	23 & 24 Vict. c. 51	23 July 1860
An Act to provide for an annual Return of Rates, Taxes, Tolls, and Dues levied for local Purposes in England. (Repealed by Local Government Act 1933 (23 & 24 Geo. 5. c. 51))
Metropolitan Building Act (Amendment) 1860 or the Metropolitan Building (Amendment) Act 1860 (repealed)	23 & 24 Vict. c. 52	23 July 1860
An Act to alter and amend "The Metropolitan Building Act (1855)." (Note: Metropolitan Building Act 1855 (18 & 19 Vict. c. 122)) (Repealed by London Building Act 1894 (57 & 58 Vict. c. ccxiii))
Duchy of Cornwall Act 1860 (repealed)	23 & 24 Vict. c. 53	23 July 1860
An Act for the limitation of actions and suits by the Duke of Cornwall in relation to real property and for authorising certain leases of possessions of the Duchy. (Repealed by Statute Law (Repeals) Act 1978 (c. 45))
Court of Queen's Bench Act Amendment Act or the Court of Queen's Bench Act Amendment Act 1860 or the Crown Office Act 1860 (repealed)	23 & 24 Vict. c. 54	6 August 1860
An Act to amend an Act (Note: Court of Queen's Bench Act 1843 (6 & 7 Vict. c. 20)) for abolishing certain Offices on the Crown Side of the Court of Queen's Bench, and for regulating the Crown Office. (Repealed by Statute Law Revision and Civil Procedure Act 1881 (44 & 45 Vict. c. 59))
Second Annual Inclosure Act 1860 or the Inclosure (No. 2) Act 1860	23 & 24 Vict. c. 55	6 August 1860
An Act to authorize the Inclosure of certain Lands in pursuance of a Special Report of the Inclosure Commissioners.
Isle of Man Harbours Act 1860 (repealed)	23 & 24 Vict. c. 56	6 August 1860
An Act to make further Provision for Improvements in the Harbours of the Isle of Man. (Repealed by Isle of Man Harbours Act 1872 (35 & 36 Vict. c. 23))
Dominica Loan Act 1860 or the Dominica Hurricane Loan Act 1860 (repealed)	23 & 24 Vict. c. 57	6 August 1860
An Act to authorize an Extension of the Time for Repayment of a Loan made by the West India Relief Commissioners to the Island of Dominica. (Repealed by Statute Law Revision Act 1875 (38 & 39 Vict. c. 66))
Friendly Societies (No. 2) Act 1860 (repealed)	23 & 24 Vict. c. 58	6 August 1860
An Act to amend the Act of the Eighteenth and Nineteenth Years of Her Majesty relating to Friendly Societies. (Note: Friendly Societies Act 1855 (18 & 19 Vict. c. 63)) (Repealed by Friendly Societies Act 1875 (38 & 39 Vict. c. 60))
Universities and College Estates Act Extension 1860 or the Universities and College Estates (Extension) Act 1860 (repealed)	23 & 24 Vict. c. 59	6 August 1860
An Act to extend the Provisions of the Universities and College Estates Act (1858), (Note: Universities and College Estates Act 1858 (21 & 22 Vict. c. 44)) and of the Copyhold Acts, and of the Act of the Third and Fourth Years of the Reign of Her Majesty, Chapter One hundred and thirteen, (Note: Ecclesiastical Commissioners Act 1840 (3 & 4 Vict. c. 113)) and of the Seventeenth and Eighteenth Years of the same Reign, Chapter Eighty-four, (Note: Augmentation of Benefices Act 1854 (17 & 18 Vict. c. 84)) so far as the same relate to Universities and Colleges. (Repealed by Universities and College Estates Act 1925 (15 & 16 Geo. 5. c. 24))
Queen's Prison Act 1860 (repealed)	23 & 24 Vict. c. 60	6 August 1860
An Act to amend the Act for regulating the Queen's Prison. (Note: Queen's Prison Act 1842 (5 & 6 Vict. c. 22)) (Repealed by Statute Law Revision Act 1875 (38 & 39 Vict. c. 66))
Census Act 1860 (repealed)	23 & 24 Vict. c. 61	6 August 1860
An Act for taking the Census of England. (Repealed by Statute Law Revision Act 1875 (38 & 39 Vict. c. 66))
Census Act (No. 2) 1860 or the Census (No. 2) Act 1860 (repealed)	23 & 24 Vict. c. 62	6 August 1860
An Act for taking the Census of Ireland. (Repealed by Statute Law Revision Act 1875 (38 & 39 Vict. c. 66))
Jews Act 1860 (repealed)	23 & 24 Vict. c. 63	6 August 1860
An Act to amend the Act of the Twenty-first and Twenty-second Years of Victoria, Chapter Forty-nine, (Note: Jews Relief Act 1858 (21 & 22 Vict. c. 49)) to provide for the Relief of Her Majesty's Subjects professing the Jewish Religion. (Repealed by Parliamentary Oaths Act 1866 (29 & 30 Vict. c. 19))
Burial Act 1860 (repealed)	23 & 24 Vict. c. 64	6 August 1860
An Act to make further Provision for the Expenses of Local Boards of Health and Improvement Commissioners acting as Burial Boards. (Repealed by Local Government Act 1972 (c. 70))
Post Office (Duties) Act 1860 (repealed)	23 & 24 Vict. c. 65	6 August 1860
An Act to authorize the Commissioners of the Treasury to further regulate the Postage on redirected Letters of Commissioned and Warrant Officers, Seamen, and Soldiers whilst on actual Service. (Repealed by Post Office Act 1908 (8 Edw. 7. c. 48))
Medical Act 1860	23 & 24 Vict. c. 66	6 August 1860
An Act to amend the Medical Act (1858). (Note: Medical Act 1858 (21 & 22 Vict. c. 90))
Highway Rates Act 1860 (repealed)	23 & 24 Vict. c. 67	6 August 1860
An Act to continue an Act (Note: Application of Highway Rates to Turnpikes Act 1841 (4 & 5 Vict. c. 59)) for authorizing the Application of Highway Rates to Turnpike Roads. (Repealed by Statute Law Revision Act 1875 (38 & 39 Vict. c. 66))
South Wales Highways Act 1860 (repealed)	23 & 24 Vict. c. 68	6 August 1860
An Act for the better Management and Control of the Highways in South Wales. (Repealed by Highways Act 1959 (7 & 8 Eliz. 2. c. 25))
Manchester Cathedral Act 1860	23 & 24 Vict. c. 69	6 August 1860
An Act to enable the Ecclesiastical Commissioners for England to apply certain Funds towards the Repairs of the Cathedral or Collegiate Church of Manchester.
Provisional Order Confirmation Turnpikes Act 1860 (repealed)	23 & 24 Vict. c. 70	6 August 1860
An Act to confirm certain Provisional Orders made under an Act of the Fifteenth Year of Her present Majesty, (Note: Turnpike Trusts (Making of Provisional Orders) Act 1851 (14 & 15 Vict. c. 38)) to facilitate Arrangements for the Relief of Turnpike Trusts. (Repealed by Statute Law (Repeals) Act 1981 (c. 19))
Reduction of the National Debt Act 1860 (repealed)	23 & 24 Vict. c. 71	6 August 1860
An Act to make Provision as to Stock and Dividends unclaimed in Ireland. (Repealed by Statute Law Revision Act 1870 (33 & 34 Vict. c. 69))
Endowment and Augmentation of Small Benefices Act (Ireland) 1860 or the Endowment and Augmentation of Small Benefices (Ireland) Act 1860	23 & 24 Vict. c. 72	6 August 1860
An Act to promote and facilitate the Endowment and Augmentation of small Benefices in Ireland.
Annual Turnpike Acts Continuance Act 1860 (repealed)	23 & 24 Vict. c. 73	6 August 1860
An Act to continue certain Turnpike Acts in Great Britain, and to extend the Provisions of the Act of the Fourteenth and Fifteenth Years of Her present Majesty, Chapter Thirty-eight. (Repealed by Statute Law Revision Act 1875 (38 & 39 Vict. c. 66))
Borough Coroners (Ireland) Act 1860 (repealed)	23 & 24 Vict. c. 74	6 August 1860
An Act to amend the Provisions of the Act (Note: Municipal Corporations (Ireland) Act 1840 (3 & 4 Vict. c. 108)) for the Regulation of Municipal Corporations in Ireland, with respect to the Appointment of Coroners in Boroughs. (Repealed by Coroners Act (Northern Ireland) 1959 (c. 15 (N.I.)))
Criminal Lunatic Asylums Act 1860 (repealed)	23 & 24 Vict. c. 75	6 August 1860
An Act to make better Provision for the Custody and Care of Criminal Lunatics. (Repealed by Mental Health Act 1959 (7 & 8 Eliz. 2. c. 72))
Burial Grounds (Ireland) Act 1860 (repealed)	23 & 24 Vict. c. 76	6 August 1860
An Act to amend the Burial Grounds (Ireland) Act (1856). (Note: Burial Grounds (Ireland) Act 1856 (19 & 20 Vict. c. 98)) (Repealed by Public Health (Ireland) Act 1878 (41 & 42 Vict. c. 52))
Nuisances Removal Act 1860 or the Nuisances Removal and Diseases Prevention Act 1860 (repealed)	23 & 24 Vict. c. 77	6 August 1860
An Act to amend the Acts for the Removal of Nuisances and the Prevention of Diseases. (Repealed for England and Wales by Public Health Act 1875 (38 & 39 Vict. c. 55) and Public Health (London) Act 1891 (54 & 55 Vict. c. 76) and for Ireland by Public Health (Ireland) Act 1878 (41 & 42 Vict. c. 52))
Bleaching and Dyeing Works Act 1860 (repealed)	23 & 24 Vict. c. 78	6 August 1860
An Act to place the Employment of Women Young Persons and Children in Bleaching Works and Dyeing Works under the Regulations of the Factories Acts. (Repealed by Factory and Workshop Act 1870 (33 & 34 Vict. c. 62))
Sheriff Court Houses Act 1860 or the Sheriff Court Houses (Scotland) Act 1860 (repealed)	23 & 24 Vict. c. 79	6 August 1860
An Act to provide additional Accommodation for the Sheriff Courts in Scotland. (Repealed by Sheriff Courts (Scotland) Act 1971 (c. 58))
Heritable Securities (Scotland) Act 1860 (repealed)	23 & 24 Vict. c. 80	6 August 1860
An Act to regulate the Levying and Collection of the Inventory Duty payable upon Heritable Securities and other Property in Scotland. (Repealed by Statute Law Revision Act 1875 (38 & 39 Vict. c. 66), Statute Law Revision Act 1892 (55 & 56 Vict. c. 19), Statute Law Revision Act 1894 (57 & 58 Vict. c. 56) and Finance Act 1975 (c. 7))
Copyhold Commission Continuance Act 1860 (repealed)	23 & 24 Vict. c. 81	6 August 1860
An Act to continue Appointments under the Act (Note: Inclosure Commissioners Act 1851 (14 & 15 Vict. c. 53)) for consolidating the Copyhold and Inclosure Commissions and for completing Proceedings under the Tithe Commutation Acts. (Repealed by Statute Law Revision Act 1875 (38 & 39 Vict. c. 66))
Common Law Procedure (Ireland) Act 1860 (repealed)	23 & 24 Vict. c. 82	6 August 1860
An Act to amend the Provisions of The Common Law Procedure Ireland Act Amendment (1853). (Note: Common Law Procedure Amendment Act (Ireland) 1853 (16 & 17 Vict. c. 113)) (Repealed by Statute Law Revision Act 1953 (2 & 3 Eliz. 2. c. 5))
Infant Marriage Act 1860 (repealed)	23 & 24 Vict. c. 83	6 August 1860
An Act to explain an Act of the Eighteenth and Nineteenth Years of Her present Majesty (Note: Infant Settlements Act 1855 (18 & 19 Vict. c. 43)) enabling Infants with the Approbation of the Court of Chancery to make binding Settlements of their Real and Personal Estate on Marriage. (Repealed by Statute Law Revision Act 1892 (55 & 56 Vict. c. 19) and Age of Majority Act (Northern Ireland) 1969 (c. 28 (N.I.)))
Adulteration of Food and Drink Act 1860 or the Food Adulteration Act 1860 (repealed)	23 & 24 Vict. c. 84	6 August 1860
An Act for preventing the Adulteration of Articles of Food or Drink. (Repealed by Sale of Food and Drugs Act 1875 (38 & 39 Vict. c. 63) (Note: Incorrectly cited as "Sale of Food and Drugs, 1875 c 60" in the Chronological Table of the Statutes.))
Registration of Births, Deaths, and Marriages (Scotland) Act 1860 or the Registration (Scotland, Amendment) Act 1860 (repealed)	23 & 24 Vict. c. 85	6 August 1860
An Act to amend Two Acts of the Seventeenth and Eighteenth Years (Note: Registration of Births, Deaths, and Marriages (Scotland) Act 1854 (17 & 18 Vict. c. 80)) and of the Eighteenth Year (Note: Registration of Births, Deaths, and Marriages (Scotland) Act 1855 (18 & 19 Vict. c. 29)) of Her present Majesty relating to the Registration of Births Deaths and Marriages in Scotland. (Repealed by Registration of Births, Deaths and Marriages (Scotland) Act 1965 (c. 49))
Marriages, Ionian Islands Act 1860 (repealed)	23 & 24 Vict. c. 86	6 August 1860
An Act to make Provision respecting the Marriages of British Subjects in the Ionian Islands. (Repealed by Ionian States Acts of Parliament Act 1864 (27 & 28 Vict. c. 77))
Senior Member of Council, India Act 1860 (repealed)	23 & 24 Vict. c. 87	13 August 1860
An Act to remove Doubts as to the Authority of the Senior Member of the Council of the Governor-General of India in the Absence of the President. (Repealed by Indian Councils Act 1861 (24 & 25 Vict. c. 67))
Admiralty Jurisdiction (India) Act 1860 (repealed)	23 & 24 Vict. c. 88	13 August 1860
An Act to extend certain Provisions for Admiralty Jurisdiction in the Colonies to Her Majesty's Territories in India. (Repealed by Statute Law Revision Act 1966 (c. 5))
Superannuation Act 1860 (repealed)	23 & 24 Vict. c. 89	13 August 1860
An Act to extend in certain Cases the Provisions of the Superannuation Act, 1859. (Note: Superannuation Act 1859 (22 Vict. c. 26)) (Repealed by Government of India Act 1935 (25 & 26 Geo. 5. c. 42))
Game Licences Act 1860	23 & 24 Vict. c. 90	13 August 1860
An Act to repeal the Duties on Game Certificates and Certificates to deal in Game, and to impose in lieu thereof Duties on Excise Licences and Certificates for the like Purposes. (Repealed for England and Wales by Regulatory Reform (Game) Order 2007 (SI 2007/2007) and for Scotland by Wildlife and Natural Environment (Scotland) Act 2011 (asp 6))
Oxford University Act 1860	23 & 24 Vict. c. 91	13 August 1860
An Act for removing Doubts respecting the Craven Scholarships in the University of Oxford, and for enabling the University to retain the Custody of certain Testamentary Documents.
Herring Fisheries (Scotland) Act 1860 (repealed)	23 & 24 Vict. c. 92	13 August 1860
An Act to amend the Law relative to the Scottish Herring Fisheries. (Repealed by Inshore Fishing (Scotland) Act 1984 (c. 26))
Tithe Act 1860	23 & 24 Vict. c. 93	13 August 1860
An Act to amend and further extend the Acts for the commutation of tithes in England and Wales.
Militia (Storehouses) Act 1860 (repealed)	23 & 24 Vict. c. 94	13 August 1860
An Act to amend the Laws relating to the Militia. (Repealed by Territorial Army and Militia Act 1921 (11 & 12 Geo. 5. c. 37))
Entail Cottages Act 1860	23 & 24 Vict. c. 95	13 August 1860
An Act to facilitate the building of cottages for labourers, farm servants, and artisans by the proprietors of entailed estates in Scotland.
Police of Towns (Scotland) Amendment Act 1860 (repealed)	23 & 24 Vict. c. 96	13 August 1860
An Act to amend the Police of Towns Improvement Act, (Note: Police (Scotland) Act 1850 (13 & 14 Vict. c. 33)) so as to enable Towns and populous Places in Scotland to avail themselves of its Provisions for sanitary and other Improvements without at the same Time adopting its Provisions as regards the Establishment and Maintenance of a Police Force. (Repealed by General Police and Improvement (Scotland) Act 1862 (25 & 26 Vict. c. 101))
Railways Act (Ireland) 1860 or the Railways (Ireland) Act 1860	23 & 24 Vict. c. 97	13 August 1860
An Act for amending and making perpetual the Railways Act, Ireland (1851). (Note: Railways Act (Ireland) 1851 (14 & 15 Vict. c. 70))
Census (Scotland) Act 1860 (repealed)	23 & 24 Vict. c. 98	20 August 1860
An Act for taking the Census in Scotland. (Repealed by Statute Law Revision Act 1875 (38 & 39 Vict. c. 66))
Corrupt Practices 1854, Act Continuance Act 1860 or the Corrupt Practices Act 1854 Continuance Act 1860 (repealed)	23 & 24 Vict. c. 99	20 August 1860
An Act to continue the Corrupt Practices Prevention Act (1854). (Note: Corrupt Practices Prevention Act 1854 (17 & 18 Vict. c. 102)) (Repealed by Statute Law Revision Act 1875 (38 & 39 Vict. c. 66))
European Forces (India) Act 1860 (repealed)	23 & 24 Vict. c. 100	20 August 1860
An Act to repeal so much of the Act of the Twenty second and Twenty third Victoria, Chapter Twenty seven, (Note: European Troops in India Act 1859 (22 & 23 Vict. c. 27)) and of certain other Acts, as authorizes the Secretary of State in Council to give Directions for raising European Forces for the Indian Army of Her Majesty. (Repealed by Government of India Act 1915 (5 & 6 Geo. 5. c. 61))
Poor Law Board Continuance Act 1860 (repealed)	23 & 24 Vict. c. 101	20 August 1860
An Act to continue the Poor Law Board. (Repealed by Statute Law Revision Act 1875 (38 & 39 Vict. c. 66))
East India Stock Act 1860 (repealed)	23 & 24 Vict. c. 102	20 August 1860
An Act to provide for the Management of East India Stock, and of the Debts and Obligations of the Government of India, at and by the Bank of England. (Repealed by Government of India Act 1915 (5 & 6 Geo. 5. c. 61) and East India Loans Act 1937 (1 Edw. 8 & 1 Geo. 6. c. 14))
Consolidated Fund (£10,000,000) Act 1860 or the Supply (No. 5) Act 1860 (repealed)	23 & 24 Vict. c. 103	20 August 1860
An Act to apply the Sum of Ten Millions out of the Consolidated Fund to the Service of the Year One thousand eight hundred and sixty. (Repealed by Statute Law Revision Act 1875 (38 & 39 Vict. c. 66))
Maynooth College Act 1860 (repealed)	23 & 24 Vict. c. 104	20 August 1860
An Act to enable the Trustees of the Royal College of Saint Patrick at Maynooth to make Provision for certain necessary Buildings and Repairs. (Repealed by Irish Church Act 1869 (32 & 33 Vict. c. 42))
Prisons (Scotland) Act 1860 or the Prisons (Scotland) Administration Act 1860 (repealed)	23 & 24 Vict. c. 105	20 August 1860
Act to provide for the Management of the General Prison at Perth, and for the Administration of Local Prisons in Scotland. (Repealed by Prisons (Scotland) Act 1952 (15 & 16 Geo. 6 & 1 Eliz. 2. c. 61))
Lands Clauses Consolidation Acts Amendment Act 1860 or the Lands Clauses Consolidation Act 1860	23 & 24 Vict. c. 106	20 August 1860
An Act to amend the Lands Clauses Consolidation Acts, 1845, in regard to sales and compensation for land by way of a rentcharge, annual feu duty or ground annual, and to enable Her Majesty’s Principal Secretary of State for the War Department to avail himself of the powers and provisions contained in the same Acts.
Refreshment Houses (Ireland) Act 1860 (repealed)	23 & 24 Vict. c. 107	28 August 1860
An Act for granting to Her Majesty certain Duties on Wine Licences and Refreshment Houses, and for regulating the licensing of Refreshment Houses and the granting of Wine Licences, in Ireland. (Repealed by Finance Act (Northern Ireland) 1953 (c. 23 (N.I.)))
Industrial Schools Act 1860 (repealed)	23 & 24 Vict. c. 108	28 August 1860
An Act to amend the Industrial Schools Act, 1857. (Note: Industrial Schools Act 1857 (20 & 21 Vict. c. 48)) (Repealed by Industrial Schools Act 1861 (24 & 25 Vict. c. 113))
Protection of Royal Arsenals, etc. Act 1860 (repealed)	23 & 24 Vict. c. 109	28 August 1860
An Act for defraying the Expenses of constructing Fortifications for the Protection of the Royal Arsenals and Dockyards and the Ports of Dover and Portland, and of creating a Central Arsenal. (Repealed by Revenue, Friendly Societies, and National Debt Act 1882 (45 & 46 Vict. c. 72))
Customs Duties Consolidation Act 1860 or the Customs Consolidation Act 1860 (repealed)	23 & 24 Vict. c. 110	28 August 1860
An Act to consolidate the Duties of Customs. (Repealed by Statute Law Revision Act 1878 (41 & 42 Vict. c. 79))
Stamp Duties Act 1860 (repealed)	23 & 24 Vict. c. 111	28 August 1860
An Act for granting to Her Majesty certain Duties of Stamps, and to amend the Laws relating to the Stamp Duties. (Repealed by Statute Law Revision Act 1892 (55 & 56 Vict. c. 19))
Defence Act 1860	23 & 24 Vict. c. 112	28 August 1860
An Act to make better provision for acquiring Lands for the Defence of the Realm.
Excise Act 1860 (repealed)	23 & 24 Vict. c. 113	28 August 1860
An Act to grant Duties of Excise on Chicory, and on Licences to Dealers in Sweets or Made Wines; to repeal the Exemption from Licence Duty of Persons dealing in Foreign Wine and Spirits in Bond; and to amend the Laws relating to the Excise. (Repealed by Customs and Excise Act 1952 (15 & 16 Geo. 6 & 1 Eliz. 2. c. 44) and Miscellaneous Transferred Excise Duties Act (Northern Ireland) 1953 (c. 24 (N.I.)))
Spirits Act 1860 (repealed)	23 & 24 Vict. c. 114	28 August 1860
An Act to reduce into One Act and to amend the Excise Regulations relating to the distilling, rectifying, and dealing in Spirits. (Repealed by Spirits Act 1880 (43 & 44 Vict. c. 24))
Crown Debts and Judgments Act 1860 (repealed)	23 & 24 Vict. c. 115	28 August 1860
An Act to simplify and amend the Practice as to the Entry of Satisfaction on Crown Debts and on Judgments. (Repealed by Administration of Justice Act 1982 (c. 53))
County Coroners Act 1860 (repealed)	23 & 24 Vict. c. 116	28 August 1860
An Act to amend the Law relating to the Election, Duties, and Payment of County Coroners. (Repealed by Coroners Act 1887 (50 & 51 Vict. c. 71) and Coroners (Amendment) Act 1926 (16 & 17 Geo. 5. c. 59))
Industrial Museum (Scotland) Act 1860	23 & 24 Vict. c. 117	28 August 1860
An Act to confer Powers on the Commissioners of Her Majesty's Works and Public Buildings to acquire certain Property in Edinburgh, for the Erection of an Industrial Museum for Scotland.
Local Government Supplemental Act 1860 (No. 2) or the Local Government Supplemental (No. 2) Act 1860	23 & 24 Vict. c. 118	28 August 1860
An Act to confirm certain Provisional Orders under the Local Government Act (1858), relating to the Districts of Nottingham, Sunderland, Hastings, Reading, Chatham, Dartmouth, Tunbridge Wells, Sheerness, Sandgate, Wilton, Bridgnorth, and Dorchester.
	Provisional Order putting in force the Lands Clauses Consolidation Act, 1845, within the District of the Local Board for the Borough of Nottingham, for the Purchase and taking of Lands by the said Board, otherwise than by Agreement.	
	Provisional Order putting in force the Lands Clauses Consolidation Act, 1845, within the District of the Local Board of Health for the Borough of Sunderland, in the County of Durham, for the Purchase of Lands by the said Board for Street Improvements.	
	Provisional Order putting in force the Lands Clauses Consolidation Act, 1845, within the District of the Hastings Local Board of Health, in the County of Sussex, for the Purchase of Lands by the said Board for Street Improvements and other Purposes.	
	Provisional Order putting in force the Lands Clauses Consolidation Act, 1845, within the District of the Reading Local Board of Health, for the Purchase of Land by the said Board.	
	Provisional Order repealing Local Acts (Note: Chatham (Streets) Act 1772 (12 Geo. 3. 18)) (Note: Chatham (Improvement) Act 1776 (16 Geo. 3. c. 58)) in force within the District of the Chatham Local Board of Health.	
	Provisional Order repealing and altering Parts of a Local Act (Note: Clifton Dartmouth Hardness Market and Improvement Act 1815 (55 Geo. 3. c. xxviii)) in force within the District of the Dartmouth Local Board.	
	Provisional Order repealing and altering Parts of a Local Act (Note: Tunbridge Wells Improvement Act 1846 (9 & 10 Vict. c. cccxlix)) in force within the District of Tunbridge Wells.	
	Provisional Order for altering the Boundaries of the District of Minster in the County of Kent, as constituted for the Purposes of the Public Health Act, 1848.	
	Provisional Order for extending the Borrowing Powers of the Sandgate Local Board of Health.	
	Provisional Order for extending the Borrowing Powers of the Wilton Local Board of Health.	
	Provisional Order for extending the Borrowing Powers of the Bridgnorth Local Board of Health.	
	Provisional Order for extending the Borrowing Powers of the Dorchester Local Board of Health.	
Weights and Measures (Ireland) Act 1860 (repealed)	23 & 24 Vict. c. 119	28 August 1860
An Act to amend the Law relating to Weights and Measures in Ireland. (Repealed by Weights and Measures Act 1878 (41 & 42 Vict. c. 49))
Militia (Ballot) Act 1860 (repealed)	23 & 24 Vict. c. 120	28 August 1860
An Act to amend the Laws relating to the Ballots for the Militia in England, and to suspend the making of Lists and Ballots for the Militia of the United Kingdom. (Repealed by Territorial Army and Militia Act 1921 (11 & 12 Geo. 5. c. 37))
West Coast of Africa and Falkland Islands Act 1860 (repealed)	23 & 24 Vict. c. 121	28 August 1860
An Act to amend an Act passed in the Sixth Year of Her Majesty Queen Victoria, intituled "An Act to enable Her Majesty to provide for the Government of Her Settlements on the Coast of Africa and in the Falkland Islands." (Note: British Settlements Act 1843 (6 & 7 Vict. c. 13)) (Repealed by British Settlements Act 1887 (50 & 51 Vict. c. 54))
Admiralty Offences (Colonial) Act 1860	23 & 24 Vict. c. 122	28 August 1860
An Act to enable the Legislatures of Her Majesty’s Possessions abroad to make Enactments similar to the Enactment of the Act Ninth George the Fourth, Chapter Thirty-one, (Note: Offences Against the Person Act 1828 (9 Geo. 4. c. 31)) Section Eight.
Naval Discipline Act 1860 (repealed)	23 & 24 Vict. c. 123	28 August 1860
An Act to amend the Laws relating to the Government of the Navy. (Repealed by Naval Discipline Act 1861 (24 & 25 Vict. c. 115))
Ecclesiastical Commissioners Act 1860	23 & 24 Vict. c. 124	28 August 1860
An Act further to amend the Acts relating to the Ecclesiastical Commissioners, and the Act (Note: Episcopal and Capitular Estates Act 1857 (20 & 21 Vict. c. 74)) concerning the Management of Episcopal and Capitular Estates in England.
Metropolis Gas Act 1860 (repealed)	23 & 24 Vict. c. 125	28 August 1860
An Act for better regulating the Supply of Gas to the Metropolis. (Repealed by Statute Law (Repeals) Act 1977 (c. 18))
Common Law Procedure Act 1860 (repealed)	23 & 24 Vict. c. 126	28 August 1860
An Act for the further Amendment of the Process, Practice, and Mode of Pleading in and enlarging the Jurisdiction of the Superior Courts of Common Law at Westminster. (Repealed by Conveyancing Act 1881 (44 & 45 Vict. c. 41), Statute Law Revision and Civil Procedure Act 1883 (46 & 47 Vict. c. 49), Supreme Court of Judicature (Consolidation) Act 1925 (15 & 16 Geo. 5. c. 49), Rules of the Supreme Court (No. 1) Order 1929 (SR&O 1929/424) and Statute Law Revision Act 1950 (14 Geo. 6. c. 6))
Solicitors Act 1860 or the Attorneys and Solicitors Act 1860 (repealed)	23 & 24 Vict. c. 127	28 August 1860
An Act to amend the Laws relating to Attorneys, Solicitors, Proctors, and Certificated Conveyancers. (Repealed by Administration of Justice Act 1965 (c. 2))
Chancery Rules and Orders Act 1860 or the Chancery Evidence Act 1860 or the Chancery Evidence Commission Act 1860 (repealed)	23 & 24 Vict. c. 128	28 August 1860
An Act to enable the Lord Chancellor and Judges of the Court of Chancery to carry into effect the Recommendations and Suggestions of the Chancery Evidence Commissioners by General Rules and Orders of the Court. (Repealed by Supreme Court of Judicature (Officers) Act 1879 (42 & 43 Vict. c. 78))
Excise on Spirits Act 1860 (repealed)	23 & 24 Vict. c. 129	28 August 1860
An Act to grant Excise Duties on British Spirits and on Spirits imported from the Channel Islands. (Repealed by Statute Law Revision Act 1875 (38 & 39 Vict. c. 66), Customs and Inland Revenue Act 1881 (44 & 45 Vict. c. 12), Customs and Inland Revenue Act 1885 (48 & 49 Vict. c. 51), Finance Act 1918 (8 & 9 Geo. 5. c. 15) and Statute Law Revision Act 1950 (14 Geo. 6. c. 6))
East India Loan Act 1860 (repealed)	23 & 24 Vict. c. 130	28 August 1860
An Act to enable the Secretary of State in Council of India to raise Money in the United Kingdom for the Service of the Government of India. (Repealed by East India Loans Act 1937 (1 Edw. 8 & 1 Geo. 6. c. 14))
Appropriation Act 1860 (repealed)	23 & 24 Vict. c. 131	28 August 1860
An Act to apply a Sum out of the Consolidated Fund and the Surplus of Ways and Means to the Service of the Year One thousand eight hundred and sixty, and to appropriate the Supplies granted in this Session of Parliament. (Repealed by Statute Law Revision Act 1875 (38 & 39 Vict. c. 66))
Exchequer Bonds and Bills Act 1860 (repealed)	23 & 24 Vict. c. 132	28 August 1860
An Act for raising the Sum of Two million Pounds by Exchequer Bonds or Exchequer Bills for the Service of the Year One thousand eight hundred and sixty. (Repealed by Statute Law Revision Act 1875 (38 & 39 Vict. c. 66))
Militia Pay Act 1860 (repealed)	23 & 24 Vict. c. 133	28 August 1860
An Act to defray the Charge of the Pay Clothing and contingent and other Expenses of the Disembodied Militia in Great Britain and Ireland; to grant Allowances in certain Cases to Subaltern Officers, Adjutants, Paymasters, Quartermasters, Surgeons, Assistant Surgeons, and Surgeons Mates of the Militia; and to authorize the Employment of the Non-commissioned Officers. (Repealed by Statute Law Revision Act 1875 (38 & 39 Vict. c. 66))
Roman Catholic Charities Act 1860 or the Roman Catholic Charities Act (repealed)	23 & 24 Vict. c. 134	28 August 1860
An Act to amend the Law regarding Roman Catholic Charities. (Repealed by Charities Act 1960 (8 & 9 Eliz. 2. c. 58))
Metropolitan Police Act 1860	23 & 24 Vict. c. 135	28 August 1860
An Act for the Employment of the Metropolitan Police Force in Her Majesty’s Yards and Military Stations.
Charitable Trusts Act 1860 (repealed)	23 & 24 Vict. c. 136	28 August 1860
An Act to amend the Law relating to the Administration of Endowed Charities. (Repealed by Charities Act 1960 (8 & 9 Eliz. 2. c. 58))
National Debt Commissioners (Investments) Act 1860 (repealed)	23 & 24 Vict. c. 137	28 August 1860
An Act to make further Provision with respect to Monies received from Savings Banks and Friendly Societies. (Repealed by Trustee Savings Banks Act 1954 (2 & 3 Eliz. 2. c. 63))
Peace Preservation (Ireland) Act 1860 (repealed)	23 & 24 Vict. c. 138	28 August 1860
An Act to continue and amend the Peace Preservation (Ireland) Act (1856). (Note: Peace Preservation (Ireland) Act 1856 (19 & 20 Vict. c. 36)) (Repealed by Statute Law Revision Act 1875 (38 & 39 Vict. c. 66))
Gunpowder Act 1860 or the Gunpowder and Fireworks Act 1860 (repealed)	23 & 24 Vict. c. 139	28 August 1860
An Act to amend the Law concerning the making, keeping, and Carriage of Gunpowder and Compositions of an explosive Nature, and concerning the Manufacture, Sale, and Use of Fireworks. (Repealed by Explosives Act 1875 (38 & 39 Vict. c. 17))
Rifle Volunteer Grounds Act 1860 (repealed)	23 & 24 Vict. c. 140	28 August 1860
An Act for facilitating the Acquisition by Rifle Volunteer Corps of Grounds for Rifle Practice. (Repealed by Volunteer Act 1863 (26 & 27 Vict. c. 65))
Party Emblems (Ireland) Act 1860 (repealed)	23 & 24 Vict. c. 141	28 August 1860
An Act to amend an Act passed in the Thirteenth Year of Her Majesty, (Note: Party Processions (Ireland) Act 1850 (13 & 14 Vict. c. 2)) to restrain Party Processions in Ireland. (Repealed by Statute Law Revision Act 1875 (38 & 39 Vict. c. 66))
Union of Benefices Act 1860 (repealed)	23 & 24 Vict. c. 142	28 August 1860
An Act to make better Provision for the Union of contiguous Benefices in Cities, Towns, and Boroughs. (Repealed by Pastoral Measure 1968 (No. 1) and Statute Law (Repeals) Act 1974 (c. 22))
Titles to Land (Scotland) Act 1860 (repealed)	23 & 24 Vict. c. 143	28 August 1860
An Act to extend certain Provisions of the Titles to Land (Scotland) Act, 1858, (Note: Titles to Land (Scotland) Act 1858 (21 & 22 Vict. c. 76)) to Titles to Land held by Burgage Tenure; and to amend the said Act. (Repealed by Titles to Land Consolidation (Scotland) Act 1868 (31 & 32 Vict. c. 101))
Matrimonial Causes Act 1860 (repealed)	23 & 24 Vict. c. 144	28 August 1860
An Act to amend the Procedure and Powers of the Court for Divorce and Matrimonial Causes. (Repealed by Supreme Court of Judicature (Consolidation) Act 1925 (15 & 16 Geo. 5. c. 49))
Powers of Trustees, Mortgagees, etc. Act 1860 or Lord Cranworth's Act 1860 (repealed)	23 & 24 Vict. c. 145	28 August 1860
An Act to give to Trustees, Mortgagees, and others certain Powers now commonly inserted in Settlements, Mortgages, and Wills. (Repealed by Conveyancing Act 1881 (44 & 45 Vict. c. 41) and Settled Land Act 1882 (45 & 46 Vict. c. 38))
Sale of Gas Act 1860 (repealed)	23 & 24 Vict. c. 146	28 August 1860
An Act to amend the Act (Note: Sale of Gas Act 1859 (22 & 23 Vict. c. 66)) for regulating Measures used in Sales of Gas. (Repealed for England and Wales and Scotland by Gas Act 1948 (11 & 12 Geo. 6. c. 67) and for Northern Ireland by Gas (Northern Ireland) Order 1977 (SI 1977/596))
Debtors and Creditors Act 1860 (repealed)	23 & 24 Vict. c. 147	28 August 1860
An Act to amend the Seventh and Eighth Victoria, Chapter Seventy. (Note: Debtors and Creditors Act 1844 (7 & 8 Vict. c. 70)) (Repealed by Bankruptcy Repeal and Insolvent Court Act 1869 (32 & 33 Vict. c. 83))
Poor Law Commissioners (Ireland) Continuance Act 1860 (repealed)	23 & 24 Vict. c. 148	28 August 1860
An Act to continue the Powers of the Poor Law Commissioners in Ireland. (Repealed by Statute Law Revision Act 1875 (38 & 39 Vict. c. 66))
Court of Chancery Act 1860 (repealed)	23 & 24 Vict. c. 149	28 August 1860
An Act to make better Provision for the Relief of Prisoners in Contempt of the High Court of Chancery, and Pauper Defendants; and for the more efficient Despatch of Business in the said Court. (Repealed by Statute Law Revision Act 1963 (c. 30))
Church Temporalities Act 1860 or the Church Temporalities (Ireland) Act 1860	23 & 24 Vict. c. 150	28 August 1860
An Act further to amend certain Acts relating to the Temporalities of the Church in Ireland.
Mines Act 1860 (repealed)	23 & 24 Vict. c. 151	28 August 1860
An Act for the Regulation and Inspection of Mines. (Repealed by Coal Mines Regulation Act 1872 (35 & 36 Vict. c. 76) and Metalliferous Mines Regulation Act 1872 (35 & 36 Vict. c. 77))
Tramways (Ireland) Act 1860	23 & 24 Vict. c. 152	28 August 1860
An Act to facilitate internal Communication in Ireland by means of Tramroads or Tramways.
Landed Property (Ireland) Improvement Act 1860 (repealed)	23 & 24 Vict. c. 153	28 August 1860
An Act to amend the Law relating to the Tenure and Improvement of Land in Ireland. (Repealed by Statute Law Revision Act 1892 (55 & 56 Vict. c. 19), Statute Law Revision Act 1893 (56 & 57 Vict. c. 14) and Repeal of Unnecessary Laws Act (Northern Ireland) 1953 (c. 5 (N.I.)))
Landlord and Tenant Law Amendment (Ireland) Act 1860 or the Landlord and Tenant Law Amendment Act (Ireland) 1860 or Deasy's Act	23 & 24 Vict. c. 154	28 August 1860
An Act to consolidate and amend the Law of Landlord and Tenant in Ireland.

=== Local and personal acts ===
Short title	Citation	Royal assent
Long title
West Middlesex Waterworks Act 1860	23 & 24 Vict. c. i	23 March 1860
An Act to enable the Company of Proprietors of the West Middlesex Waterworks to raise a further Sum of Money; and for other Purposes.
Blackburn Gas Act 1860 (repealed)	23 & 24 Vict. c. ii	23 March 1860
An Act for enabling the Blackburn Gaslight Company to raise a further Sum of Money; and for other Purposes. (Repealed by Blackburn Improvement Act 1882 (45 & 46 Vict. c. ccxliii))
Silverdale and Newcastle Railway Act 1860	23 & 24 Vict. c. iii	31 March 1860
An Act to repeal, alter, amend, and extend some of the Powers and Provisions of "The Silverdale and Newcastle Railway Act, 1859;" (Note: Silverdale and Newcastle Railway Act 1859 (22 & 23 Vict. c. cxiv)) to authorize the stopping up, altering, and constructing of certain Roads; and for other Purposes.
Droylsden Gas Act 1860	23 & 24 Vict. c. iv	3 April 1860
An Act for supplying with Gas the Township of Droylsden and other Places adjacent thereto in the Parishes of Manchester and Ashton-under-Lyne in the County of Lancaster.
Leicester Gas Act 1860 (repealed)	23 & 24 Vict. c. v	3 April 1860
An Act for more effectually supplying with Gas the Borough of Leicester and the Neighbourhood thereof in the County of Leicester. (Repealed by Leicestershire Act 1985 (c. xvii))
Banbridge, Lisburn and Belfast and Ulster Railway Act 1860	23 & 24 Vict. c. vi	3 April 1860
An Act to enable the Banbridge, Lisburn, and Belfast Railway Company to make Deviations in their authorized Railways; and to enable the Ulster Railway Company to acquire and hold Shares in the Undertaking of the Banbridge, Lisburn, and Belfast Railway Company; and for other Purposes.
Belper Waterworks Act 1860 (repealed)	23 & 24 Vict. c. vii	3 April 1860
An Act for better supplying with Water the Township of Belper in the Parish of Duffield in the County of Derby. (Repealed by Belper Water Order 1949 (SI 1949/2102))
Wem and Bronygarth Roads Act 1860	23 & 24 Vict. c. viii	3 April 1860
An Act for more effectually repairing the Road leading from Wem to the Lime Rocks at Bronygarth in the County of Salop, and for making several Lines of Road connected with the same in the Counties of Salop and Denbigh.
Inverness and Aberdeen Junction Railway Act 1860 (repealed)	23 & 24 Vict. c. ix	3 April 1860
An Act to amend the Inverness and Aberdeen Junction Railway Act, 1856; (Note: Inverness and Aberdeen Junction Railway Act 1856 (19 & 20 Vict. c. cx)) to enable the Inverness and Aberdeen Junction Railway Company to raise further Sums of Money; and for other Purposes. (Repealed by Highland Railway Act 1865 (28 & 29 Vict. c. clxviii))
South Devon Railway Act 1860	23 & 24 Vict. c. x	15 May 1860
An Act to enable the South Devon Railway Company to improve their Plymouth and other Stations; to widen Parts of their Railway; and for other Purposes.
Calne Railway Act 1860	23 & 24 Vict. c. xi	15 May 1860
An Act to authorize the Construction of a Railway from the Great Western Railway at Chippenham to Calne in Wilts.
Liverpool Corporation Waterworks Act 1860 (repealed)	23 & 24 Vict. c. xii	15 May 1860
An Act to empower the Mayor Aldermen and Burgesses of the Borough of Liverpool to construct an additional Reservoir and other Works; and for other Purposes. (Repealed by Liverpool Corporation Act 1921 (11 & 12 Geo. 5. c. lxxiv))
Liskeard Waterworks Act 1860 (repealed)	23 & 24 Vict. c. xiii	15 May 1860
An Act for better supplying with Water the Borough and Parish of Liskeard in the County of Cornwall, and for other Purposes. (Repealed by Liskeard Corporation Act 1898 (61 & 62 Vict. c. cxxvi))
North London Railway (Additional Capital) Act 1860	23 & 24 Vict. c. xiv	15 May 1860
An Act to enable the North London Railway Company to raise an additional Sum of Money; and for other Purposes.
Marple, New Mills and Hayfield Junction Railway Act 1860	23 & 24 Vict. c. xv	15 May 1860
An Act for incorporating a Company for the Construction of a Railway from the Newton and Compstall Line of the Manchester, Sheffield, and Lincolnshire Railway at Marple in the County of Chester to New Mills and Hayfield in the County of Derby; and for other Purposes.
Stockport and Woodley Junction Railway Act 1860	23 & 24 Vict. c. xvi	15 May 1860
An Act for authorizing the Construction of a Railway from Stockport to Woodley in the County of Chester; and for other Purposes.
Brecon and Merthyr Railway (Extensions) Act 1860	23 & 24 Vict. c. xvii	15 May 1860
An Act to enable the Brecon and Merthyr Tydfil Junction Railway Company to complete their Communication with Brecon; and for other Purposes connected with their Undertaking.
Mirfield Gas Act 1860 (repealed)	23 & 24 Vict. c. xviii	15 May 1860
An Act for incorporating the Mirfield Gaslight Company (Limited), and extending their Powers, and for other Purposes. (Repealed by West Yorkshire Act 1980 (c. xiv))
Lendal Bridge and York Improvement Act 1860	23 & 24 Vict. c. xix	15 May 1860
An Act for building a Bridge across the River Ouse in the City of York, with Approaches thereto, and for raising, lowering, widening, altering, and improving certain Streets or Thoroughfares within the said City, and for other Purposes.
Liskeard and Caradon Railway Act 1860	23 & 24 Vict. c. xx	15 May 1860
An Act for consolidating and amending the Acts relating to the Liskeard and Caradon Railway Company, for authorizing the Alteration of Portions of their existing Railway, and the Construction of new Works; and for other Purposes.
Glossop and Marple Bridge Turnpike Roads Act 1860	23 & 24 Vict. c. xxi	15 May 1860
An Act to repeal the Act (Note: Road from Glossop to Marple Bridge Act 1824 (5 Geo. 4. c. xxxv)) for amending and improving the Road from Glossop to Marple Bridge in the County of Derby, and the several Branches of Roads leading to and from the same, and to make other Provisions in lieu thereof.
Leicester Cemetery Amendment Act 1860 (repealed)	23 & 24 Vict. c. xxii	15 May 1860
An Act for enabling the Mayor, Aldermen, and Burgesses of the Borough of Leicester to provide an additional Cemetery, with Approaches thereto, and to effect certain Arrangements with the Visitors of the Leicestershire and Rutland Lunatic Asylum; for amending the Acts relating to the Cemetery, Sewerage, and Waterworks in the said Borough; and for other Purposes. (Repealed by Leicestershire Act 1985 (c. xvii))
Chesterfield and Worksop Road Act 1860	23 & 24 Vict. c. xxiii	15 May 1860
An Act for more effectually repairing the Road from Chesterfield in the County of Derby to Worksop in the County of Nottingham.
Bagenalstown and Wexford Railway Act 1860	23 & 24 Vict. c. xxiv	15 May 1860
An Act to enable the Bagenalstown and Wexford Railway Company to make Railways to Enniscorthy and to a certain Limestone Quarry at Ballyellin, and an Approach Road or Roads to their Station at Wexford; and to enable the Great Southern and Western Railway Company to subscribe further Sums towards the Undertaking of the Company; and to enable the Company and the Grand Jury of the County of Wexford and the Trustees of Wexford Free Bridge to make Arrangements in reference to the said Road or Roads; and for other Purposes
Shrewsbury and Welchpool Railway Act 1860 or the Shrewsbury and Welshpool Railway Act 1860	23 & 24 Vict. c. xxv	15 May 1860
An Act to enable the Shrewsbury and Welchpool Railway Company to complete and maintain Deviations in the Line and Levels of their Railway and to complete and maintain the same across certain Roads on a Level, and to raise a further Sum of Money; and for other Purposes.
Wellington Suspension Bridge and Road (Aberdeen and Kincardine) Act 1860 (repealed)	23 & 24 Vict. c. xxvi	15 May 1860
An Act to continue and amend an Act (Note: Wellington Suspension Bridge and Road (Aberdeen and Kincardine) Act 1829 (10 Geo. 4. c. xliii)) for erecting a Bridge over the River Dee at the Craiglug in the Parish of Old Machar in the County of Aberdeen and of Nigg in the County of Kincardine, and for making a Road from Cairnrobin by the said Bridge toward the City of Aberdeen. (Repealed by Roads and Bridges (Scotland) Act 1878 (41 & 42 Vict. c. 51))
Croydon Gas Act 1860 (repealed)	23 & 24 Vict. c. xxvii	15 May 1860
An Act for granting further Powers to the Croydon Commercial Gas and Coke Company. (Repealed by Croydon Gas Act 1866 (29 & 30 Vict. c. xvi))
Grunty Fen Drainage and Improvement Act 1860	23 & 24 Vict. c. xxviii	15 May 1860
An Act for draining and improving Grunty Fen in the Isle of Ely in the County of Cambridge; and for maintaining the public Roads therein.
Clearing Act (Ireland) 1860 or the Clearing House (Ireland) Act 1860	23 & 24 Vict. c. xxix	15 May 1860
An Act for more effectually carrying out the Clearing House System in Ireland, and for facilitating legal Proceedings in relation thereto.
Spalding Waterworks Act 1860 (repealed)	23 & 24 Vict. c. xxx	15 May 1860
An Act for the better Supply of Spalding with Water. (Repealed by East Anglian (Bure Valley) Water Order 1964 (SI 1964/746))
Hedon Corporation and Borough Improvement Act 1860	23 & 24 Vict. c. xxxi	15 May 1860
An Act for the Regulation of the Municipal Corporation of the Borough of Hedon in the East Riding of the County of York, and for the Improvement of the Borough; and for other Purposes.
Lower King's Ferry Turnpike Roads Act 1860	23 & 24 Vict. c. xxxii	15 May 1860
An Act for the further Continuance of the Lower King's Ferry Roads Turnpike Trust, and for other Purposes.
Glasgow Corporation Waterworks Amendment Act 1860	23 & 24 Vict. c. xxxiii	15 May 1860
An Act to authorize the Commissioners of the Glasgow Corporation Waterworks to raise a further Sum of Money.
Norwich Corporation Markets Act 1860 (repealed)	23 & 24 Vict. c. xxxiv	15 May 1860
An Act for authorizing the Corporation of Norwich to enlarge the existing Cattle Market and other Markets in Norwich, and to establish and regulate Markets and Fairs and make new Streets in Norwich; and for other Purposes. (Repealed by Norwich City Council Act 1984 (c. xxiii))
Cannock Chase Railway Act 1860	23 & 24 Vict. c. xxxv	15 May 1860
An Act for making a Railway from the Cannock Mineral Railway into Cannock Chase in the County of Stafford.
Nottingham and Grantham Railway and Canal Act 1860	23 & 24 Vict. c. xxxvi	15 May 1860
An Act for changing the Name of "The Ambergate, Nottingham, and Boston and Eastern Junction Railway and Canal Company" to the Name "The Nottingham and Grantham Railway and Canal Company," and for reducing and regulating their Capital and borrowing Powers; and for other Purposes.
Edinburgh Railway Station Access Amendment Act 1860	23 & 24 Vict. c. xxxvii	15 May 1860
An Act to enable the Edinburgh Railway Station Access Company to raise additional Capital.
Brompton, Chatham, Gillingham and Rochester Waterworks Act 1860	23 & 24 Vict. c. xxxviii	15 May 1860
An Act to incorporate the Brompton and Gillingham Consumers Waterworks Company, Limited; to enable them to better supply Brompton, Gillingham, Chatham, and Rochester with Water; and for other Purposes.
Commercial Docks Act 1860 (repealed)	23 & 24 Vict. c. xxxix	15 May 1860
An Act for granting further Powers to the Commercial Dock Company. (Repealed by Surrey Commercial Dock Act 1864 (27 & 28 Vict. c. xxxi))
Finn Valley Railway Act 1860	23 & 24 Vict. c. xl	15 May 1860
An Act for making a Railway from Stranorlar in the County of Donegal to the Londonderry and Enniskillen Railway near Strabane in the County of Tyrone, and for other Purposes.
Lincoln Heath and Market Deeping Roads Act 1860	23 & 24 Vict. c. xli	15 May 1860
An Act to provide for the Management, Maintenance, and Repair of the Turnpike Road from Lincoln Heath to Market Deeping, and other Roads in connexion therewith; and for other Purposes.
North Staffordshire Railway Act 1860	23 & 24 Vict. c. xlii	15 May 1860
An Act for relinquishing certain Works authorized by the North Staffordshire Railway Branches Act, 1854, (Note: North Staffordshire Railway Branches Act 1854 (17 & 18 Vict. c. cxciv)) and for authorizing Agreements with respect to the Silverdale and Newcastle Railway, and for other Purposes.
Cutlers' Company's Act 1860 or the Cutlers' Company Act 1860	23 & 24 Vict. c. xliii	15 May 1860
An Act for amending the Acts passed with respect to the Master, Wardens, Searchers, Assistants, and Commonalty of the Company of Cutlers in Hallamshire in the County of York.
Stockton and Darlington Railway Act 1860	23 & 24 Vict. c. xliv	15 May 1860
An Act for authorizing the Stockton and Darlington Railway Company to raise additional Capital; and for other Purposes.
Great Northern and Western (of Ireland) Railway Act 1860	23 & 24 Vict. c. xlv	15 May 1860
An Act to enable the Great Northern and Western (of Ireland) Railway Company to make a Deviation in their authorized Railway between Roscommon and Castlereagh; and for other Purposes.
Belfast and Northern Counties Railway Act 1860	23 & 24 Vict. c. xlvi	15 May 1860
An Act for altering the Name of "The Belfast and Ballymena Railway Company" to the Name of "The Belfast and Northern Counties Railway Company;" for increasing their Capital; and for other Purposes.
Dublin, Wicklow and Wexford Railway (Enniscorthy Extension) Act 1860	23 & 24 Vict. c. xlvii	15 May 1860
An Act to enable the Dublin and Wicklow Railway Company to extend their Railway to Enniscorthy in the County of Wexford; to change the Name of the Company; and for other Purposes.
Manchester Improvement Act 1860	23 & 24 Vict. c. xlviii	15 May 1860
An Act for enabling the Mayor, Aldermen, and Citizens of the City of Manchester to effect further Improvements in the said City; and for other Purposes.
Great Southern of India Railway Amendment Act 1860 (repealed)	23 & 24 Vict. c. xlix	15 May 1860
An Act to amend "The Great Southern of India Railway Act, 1858;" (Note: Great Southern of India Railway Act 1858 (21 & 22 Vict. c. cxxxviii)) and for other Purposes. (Repealed by Statute Law (Repeals) Act 2013 (c. 2))
Andover and Redbridge Railway Act 1860	23 & 24 Vict. c. l	15 May 1860
An Act to authorize certain Deviations in the Andover and Redbridge Railway, and for other Purposes.
West Somerset Railway Amendment Act 1860	23 & 24 Vict. c. li	15 May 1860
An Act for granting further Powers to the West Somerset Railway Company.
Midland Railway (London Traffic) Act 1860	23 & 24 Vict. c. lii	15 May 1860
An Act to enable the Midland Railway Company to contract for the Use of the Undertakings of other Companies in and near London.
East India Coal Company Act 1860	23 & 24 Vict. c. liii	15 May 1860
An Act for regulating the East India Coal Company, Limited, and for making Provisions with regard to the Capital and Shares of the Company; and for other Purposes.
Carrickfergus and Larne Railway Act 1860	23 & 24 Vict. c. liv	15 May 1860
An Act for making a Railway from Carrickfergus to Larne, and for other Purposes.
Matlock Waterworks Act 1860	23 & 24 Vict. c. lv	25 May 1860
An Act for better supplying with Water the Parish of Matlock in the County of Derby.
Limerick and Ennis Railway Act 1860	23 & 24 Vict. c. lvi	25 May 1860
An Act to enable the Limerick and Ennis Railway Company to maintain their Railway across certain Roads on a Level; and to enable the Company to purchase certain Lands for the Purposes of their Undertaking; and to amend the Provisions of the Acts relating to the said Company with respect to General Meetings; and for other Purposes.
Manchester and Buxton Turnpike Trusts Continuance Act 1860 (repealed)	23 & 24 Vict. c. lvii	25 May 1860
An Act to repeal the Act 10 George IV. Chapter 114., (Note: Roads from Hurdlow House to Manchester Act 1829 (10 Geo. 4. c. cxiv)) relating to the Turnpike Roads from Hurdlow House in the County of Derby to Manchester in the County Palatine of Lancaster, and to confer other Powers in lieu thereof. (Repealed by Annual Turnpike Acts Continuance Act 1885 (48 & 49 Vict. c. 37))
Metropolitan Railway Act 1860	23 & 24 Vict. c. lviii	25 May 1860
An Act for enabling the Metropolitan Railway Company to acquire additional Lands for the Construction of the Railway and for Station Accommodation; for amending the Acts relating to the Railway; and for other Purposes.
Banbridge Junction Railway (Lease) Act 1860	23 & 24 Vict. c. lix	25 May 1860
An Act to authorize the Lease of the Banbridge Junction Railway to the Dublin and Belfast Junction Railway Company; and for other Purposes.
Belfast and County Down Railway Amendment Act 1860	23 & 24 Vict. c. lx	25 May 1860
An Act to enable the Belfast and County Down Railway Company to abandon Part of the Bangor Branch; to extend the Time for the Completion of the Remainder of such Branch, and of the Donaghadee Branch; and for other Purposes.
Belfast, Holywood and Bangor Railway Act 1860	23 & 24 Vict. c. lxi	25 May 1860
An Act for making a Railway from the Belfast and County Down Railway at Holywood to Bangor in the County of Down in Ireland.
Dublin and Kingstown Railway Act 1860	23 & 24 Vict. c. lxii	25 May 1860
An Act for a Modification of the Lease of the Dublin and Kingstown Railway to the Dublin and Wicklow Railway Company; and for regulating the Capital of the Dublin and Kingstown Railway Company; and for other Purposes.
Keith and Dufftown Railway (Deviation) Act 1860	23 & 24 Vict. c. lxiii	25 May 1860
An Act to enable the Keith and Dufftown Railway Company to abandon their authorized Line of Railway, and to make a new Line of Railway instead thereof.
Chard Railway Act 1860	23 & 24 Vict. c. lxiv	25 May 1860
An Act to authorize the Construction of a Railway from the authorized Line of the London and South-western Exeter Extension Railway to Chard in the County of Somerset.
Midland Railway (Burton Branches) Act 1860	23 & 24 Vict. c. lxv	25 May 1860
An Act to confer further Powers with respect to the Construction of Railways at or near Burton-upon-Trent, and for other Purposes.
Midland Railway (Rowsley and Buxton) Act 1860	23 & 24 Vict. c. lxvi	25 May 1860
An Act to enable the Midland Railway Company to make Railways between Rowsley and Buxton; to execute other Works; and for other Purposes.
Midland Railway (London Station) Act 1860	23 & 24 Vict. c. lxvii	25 May 1860
An Act to authorize the Midland Railway Company to construct a Station in the Parish of Saint Pancras, London, and to effect Arrangements with the Great Northern and North London Railway Companies; and with the Regent's Canal Company and for other Purposes.
Widnes Gas and Water Act 1860	23 & 24 Vict. c. lxviii	25 May 1860
An Act for better supplying with Gas and with Water the Township of Widnes in the Parish of Prescot in the County Palatine of Lancaster.
Great Western Railway (Yeovil Junctions) Act 1860	23 & 24 Vict. c. lxix	25 May 1860
An Act for enabling the Great Western Railway Company to construct a Railway in the Parishes of Clifton Maybank and Bradford Abbas in the County of Dorset in connexion with the Wilts, Somerset, and Weymouth Railway; to acquire additional Lands at Yeovil; and for other Purposes.
Sheffield Waterworks Act 1860 (repealed)	23 & 24 Vict. c. lxx	25 May 1860
An Act for increasing the Capital of the Company of Proprietors of the Sheffield Waterworks; for extending the Limits of the Sheffield Waterworks Act, 1853, (Note: Sheffield Waterworks Act 1853 (16 & 17 Vict. c. xxii)) so as to comprise the Parish of Ecclesfield; for making further Provisions with respect to the said Company; and for other Purposes. (Repealed by Sheffield Corporation (Consolidation) Act 1918 (8 & 9 Geo. 5. c. lxi))
Sirhowy Railway Act 1860	23 & 24 Vict. c. lxxi	25 May 1860
An Act for changing the Name of the Sirhowy Tramroad Company to the Name "The Sirhowy Railway Company;" and for authorizing the Company to make new Works, and to maintain and work the Sirhowy Line as a Railway, and to raise further Funds; and for regulating their Capital and Borrowing Powers; and for other Purposes.
Tewkesbury and Malvern Railway Act 1860	23 & 24 Vict. c. lxxii	25 May 1860
An Act for making a Railway from the Ashchurch and Tewkesbury Branch of the Midland Railway at Ashchurch in the County of Gloucester to Great Malvern in the County of Worcester, and for other Purposes.
East Somerset Railway Act 1860	23 & 24 Vict. c. lxxiii	14 June 1860
An Act for authorizing the East Somerset Railway Company to abandon the making of their authorized Railway from Shepton Mallett to Wells, and to make instead thereof another Railway from Shepton Mallett to Wells; and for other Purposes.
Grand Surrey Docks and Canal Act 1860 (repealed)	23 & 24 Vict. c. lxxiv	14 June 1860
An Act for authorizing the Grand Surrey Docks and Canal Company to make additional Docks and other Works, and to raise further Monies; and for other Purposes. (Repealed by Surrey Commercial Dock Act 1864 (c.xxxi))
Torquay Gas Act 1860	23 & 24 Vict. c. lxxv	14 June 1860
An Act to incorporate a Company for manufacturing and supplying Gas within the Parishes of Tormoham (including the Town of Torquay), Saint Mary Church, and Cockington, in the County of Devon; and for other Purposes.
Severn Valley Railway (Leasing) Act 1860	23 & 24 Vict. c. lxxvi	14 June 1860
An Act to enable the Oxford, Worcester, and Wolverhampton Railway Company to take on Lease the Undertaking of the Severn Valley Railway Company.
London and North Western Railway (No. 1) Act 1860	23 & 24 Vict. c. lxxvii	14 June 1860
An Act to authorize Arrangements with reference to the Use by the London and North-western Railway Company of the Station at Normanton, and the Railway between the same and Goose Hill, and for other Purposes.
North Kent Waterworks Act 1860	23 & 24 Vict. c. lxxviii	14 June 1860
An Act for supplying Dartford, Crayford, Eltham, and other Places in Kent with Water.
London and North Western and St. Helens Railway Companies Arrangements Act 1860	23 & 24 Vict. c. lxxix	14 June 1860
An Act to authorize the Transfer to the London and North-western Railway Company of Part of the Undertaking of the Saint Helens Canal and Railway Company, and for the Increase of the Capital of the Saint Helens Company.
Horsham and Steyning and Beeding Road Act 1860	23 & 24 Vict. c. lxxx	14 June 1860
An Act for repairing the Roads from Horsham to Steyning, and from thence to the Top of Steyning Hill in the County of Sussex, and from the Bottom of Steyning Hill to Slaughter's Corner in the Parish of Beeding, and from thence to Shoreham Bridge in the Parish of Old Shoreham in the said County.
West Midland Railway Act 1860	23 & 24 Vict. c. lxxxi	14 June 1860
An Act for the Amalgamation of the Newport, Abergavenny, and Hereford and the Worcester and Hereford Railway Companies with the Oxford, Worcester, and Wolverhampton Railway Company, under the Name of "The West Midland Railway Company."
Bourton-on-the-Water Railway Act 1860	23 & 24 Vict. c. lxxxii	14 June 1860
An Act for making a Railway from the Oxford, Worcester, and Wolverhampton Railway to Bourton-on-the-Water in the County of Gloucester, and for other Purposes.
Dumfries, Lochmaben and Lockerby Junction Railway Act 1860	23 & 24 Vict. c. lxxxiii	14 June 1860
An Act for making a Railway commencing by a Junction with the Glasgow and South-western Railway at or near the North or North-east End of the Passenger Station of that Railway at the Town of Dumfries, and terminating by a Junction with the Caledonian Railway at or near the North End of the Lockerby Station on that Line; and for other Purposes.
Dovor Gasworks Act 1860	23 & 24 Vict. c. lxxxiv	14 June 1860
An Act to increase the Capital and amend the Powers of the Dovor Gaslight Company.
London Hydraulic Power Company Act 1860 (repealed)	23 & 24 Vict. c. lxxxv	14 June 1860
An Act for authorizing the London Hydraulic Power Company, Limited, to acquire Powers under "The Waterworks Clauses Acts, 1847;" (Note: Waterworks Clauses Act 1847 (10 & 11 Vict. c. 17)) and for other Purposes. (Repealed by Statute Law (Repeals) Act 2013 (c. 2))
Buckinghamshire County Rate Amendment Act 1860 (repealed)	23 & 24 Vict. c. lxxxvi	14 June 1860
An Act to amend the Local Act, Fifty-fourth of George the Third, Chapter One hundred and three, (Note: Buckinghamshire County Rate Act 1814 (54 Geo. 3. c. ciii)) for making a fair and equal County Rate for the County of Buckingham. (Repealed by Statute Law (Repeals) Act 2008 (c. 12))
Newry, Warrenpoint and Rostrevor Railway Act 1860	23 & 24 Vict. c. lxxxvii	14 June 1860
An Act to grant additional Powers to the Newry, Warrenpoint, and Rostrevor Railway Company.
Ouse Outfall Act 1860	23 & 24 Vict. c. lxxxviii	14 June 1860
An Act for better defining the Powers and Liabilities of the Eau Brink Drainage Commissioners; for making Provision for the Repair and Maintenance of the Eau Brink Bridge; for simplifying the Mode of levying and collecting Drainage Taxes; for constituting from the Body of Commissioners a new Board, to be called Conservators of the Ouse Outfall; and for other Purposes.
Buckley Railway Act 1860	23 & 24 Vict. c. lxxxix	14 June 1860
An Act for making a Railway from Buckley to Connah's Quay in the County of Flint, and for other Purposes.
Cheshire Midland Railway Act 1860	23 & 24 Vict. c. xc	14 June 1860
An Act for making a Railway from Altrincham through Knutsford to Northwich in the County of Chester, and for other Purposes.
Nuneaton and Hinckley Railway Extension Act 1860	23 & 24 Vict. c. xci	14 June 1860
An Act to change the Name of the Nuneaton and Hinckley Railway Company; and to enable that Company to extend their Railway from Hinckley in the County of Leicester to the Midland Railway at Wigston Magna near Leicester in the same County; and for other Purposes.
London and South Western and Bristol and Exeter (Yeovil Station) Act 1860 or the London and South Western and Bristol and Exeter Railways (Yeovil Station) Act 1860	23 & 24 Vict. c. xcii	14 June 1860
An Act for the Alteration at Yeovil of the Salisbury and Yeovil Railway leased to the London and South-western Railway Company, and of the Yeovil and Durston Branch of the Bristol and Exeter Railway; and for the making at Yeovil of a Joint Station for the London and South-western and the Bristol and Exeter Railway Companies; and for other Purposes.
Manchester Corporation Waterworks Act 1860	23 & 24 Vict. c. xciii	14 June 1860
An Act to alter and amend the several Acts relating to the Manchester Corporation Waterworks, and for other Purposes.
Stourbridge Railway Act 1860	23 & 24 Vict. c. xciv	14 June 1860
An Act for making a Railway from Stourbridge in the County of Worcester to Old Hill, with Branches to Cradley Park and Corngreaves Ironworks, and for other Purposes.
Wellington (Salop.) Waterworks Act 1860 (repealed)	23 & 24 Vict. c. xcv	14 June 1860
An Act for incorporating the Wellington Waterworks Company, and granting Powers to them for better supplying with Water the Town of Wellington and Places adjacent thereto in the County of Salop, and for other Purposes. (Repealed by East Shropshire Water Board Order (SI 1948/2399))
Maidstone Waterworks Act 1860	23 & 24 Vict. c. xcvi	14 June 1860
An Act for better supplying with Water the Town and Parish of Maidstone in the County of Kent, and for other Purposes.
Caledonian Railway (Lesmahagow Branches) Act 1860	23 & 24 Vict. c. xcvii	14 June 1860
An Act for more completely merging in the Undertaking of the Caledonian Railway Company certain Railways known as the Lesmahagow Branches; for incorporating the Holders of the Lesmahagow Branches Stock, and securing to them a fixed Annuity; and for other Purposes.
City of Dublin Steam Packet Company's Act 1860 (repealed)	23 & 24 Vict. c. xcviii	14 June 1860
An Act for incorporating "The City of Dublin Steam Packet Company;" and for authorizing them to raise additional Capital; and for other Purposes. (Repealed by Statute Law (Repeals) Act 2013 (c. 2))
Letterkenny Railway Act 1860	23 & 24 Vict. c. xcix	3 July 1860
An Act for making a Railway from Letterkenny to the Londonderry and Enniskillen Railway in the County of Donegal; and for other Purposes.
Cork and Limerick Direct Railway Act 1860	23 & 24 Vict. c. c	3 July 1860
An Act for making a Railway from the Great Southern and Western Railway near Charleville to the Limerick and Foynes Railway near Patrick's Well, and also a short Line of Railway at Limerick, to be called "The Cork and Limerick Direct Railway," and for other Purposes.
Oswestry and Newtown Railway Act 1860	23 & 24 Vict. c. ci	3 July 1860
An Act for enabling the Oswestry and Newtown Railway Company to raise additional Capital, to lease their Undertaking; and for other Purposes.
Coln River Waterworks Act 1860	23 & 24 Vict. c. cii	3 July 1860
An Act for better supplying with Water the Towns of Staines, Hounslow, Ealing, Acton, and Hanwell, and the several Parishes and Places adjacent thereto, in the County of Middlesex, and for other Purposes.
London and South Western Railway (Exeter and North Devon) Act 1860 or the London and South Western Railway (Exeter and North Devon) Railway Act 1860	23 & 24 Vict. c. ciii	3 July 1860
An Act for authorizing the London and South-western Railway Company to make and maintain a Railway in extension of their Exeter Extension Railway, and to connect that Railway with the Bristol and Exeter Railway; and for authorizing Alterations of the Saint David's Station on the Bristol and Exeter Railway, and the laying down of Rails on the Narrow Gauge on divers Railways, and the working by the London and South-western Railway Company, over those Narrow Gauge Lines of Railway, from their Exeter Extension Railway to Bideford; and for other Purposes.
Royal Naval School Act 1860 (repealed)	23 & 24 Vict. c. civ	3 July 1860
An Act to carry into effect an Arrangement between the Corporation of the Royal Naval School and Her Majesty's Commissioners of the Patriotic Fund for the Admission of Pupils into the said School. (Repealed by Statute Law (Repeals) Act 2008 (c. 12))
Cardiff Waterworks Act 1860	23 & 24 Vict. c. cv	3 July 1860
An Act for enabling the Cardiff Waterworks Company to construct additional Works, and obtain a further Supply of Water for the Town of Cardiff and the surrounding Districts in the County of Glamorgan; and for other Purposes.
Blyth Harbour and Docks Act 1860	23 & 24 Vict. c. cvi	3 July 1860
An Act to amend "The Blyth Harbour and Dock Act, 1858;" (Note: Blyth Harbour and Dock Act 1858 (21 & 22 Vict. c. lxviii)) to extend the Time for Completion of Works, and to levy additional Tolls and Rates; and for other Purposes.
Wexford Free Bridge Act 1860	23 & 24 Vict. c. cvii	3 July 1860
An Act for continuing the Powers of the Trustees of the Wexford Free Bridge; for enabling them to complete that Bridge, and to construct and improve Approaches thereto; for authorizing the Grand Jury of the County of Wexford to present additional Sums of Money; and for other Purposes.
Cilgwrgan, Bettws and Tregynon Road Act 1860 (repealed)	23 & 24 Vict. c. cviii	3 July 1860
An Act for making a Turnpike Road from the Oswestry and Newtown Railway near Cilgwrgan in the County of Montgomery over the River Severn to Tregynon in the same County. (Repealed by Annual Turnpike Acts Continuance Act 1885 (48 & 49 Vict. c. 37))
Croydon and Balham Hill Railway Act 1860	23 & 24 Vict. c. cix	3 July 1860
An Act to authorize the London, Brighton, and South Coast Railway Company to make a Railway from the London, Brighton, and South Coast Railway in the Parish of Croydon to the West End of London and Crystal Palace Railway near Balham Hill, all in the County of Surrey, with a Branch Railway connected therewith; and for other Purposes.
Consett Waterworks Act 1860	23 & 24 Vict. c. cx	3 July 1860
An Act for better supplying with Water the Inhabitants of Consett and other Districts in the County of Durham.
Watford and Rickmansworth Railway Act 1860	23 & 24 Vict. c. cxi	3 July 1860
An Act for making a Railway from the London and North-western Railway at Watford to Rickmansworth; and for other Purposes.
Egleston Roads Act 1860	23 & 24 Vict. c. cxii	3 July 1860
An Act to create a further Term in the Egleston Roads; to add other Roads to the Trust; to repeal, amend, and extend the Act (Note: Middleton-in-Teesdale, St. Andrew Auckland and Egleston Bridge Road Act 1829 (10 Geo. 4. c. xxvii)) relating to the said Roads; and for other Purposes.
Bolton and St. Helens Turnpike Roads Act 1860	23 & 24 Vict. c. cxiii	3 July 1860
An Act for the Bolton and Saint Helen's Road in the County Palatine of Lancaster.
Dublin and Drogheda Railway Act 1860	23 & 24 Vict. c. cxiv	3 July 1860
An Act to enable the Dublin and Drogheda Railway Company to extend their Railway from Kells to Oldcastle; and for other Purposes.
North British Insurance Company's Act 1860 (repealed)	23 & 24 Vict. c. cxv	3 July 1860
An Act to amend and extend the Powers of Management of the Corporation of the North British Insurance Company. (Repealed by North British and Mercantile Insurance Company's Act 1920 (10 & 11 Geo. 5. c. cxxxii))
Morayshire Railway (Junction) Act 1860	23 & 24 Vict. c. cxvi	3 July 1860
An Act to enable the Morayshire Railway Company to construct a Railway from Elgin to Rothes; and for other Purposes.
Sovereign Life Assurance Company Act 1860	23 & 24 Vict. c. cxvii	3 July 1860
An Act to enable the Sovereign Life Assurance Company to sue and be sued; to alter and amend some of the Provisions of their Deed of Settlement; and to confer further Powers on the Company.
Doncaster and Tadcaster Turnpike Road Act 1860	23 & 24 Vict. c. cxviii	3 July 1860
An Act for the Doncaster and Tadcaster Road in the West Riding of the County of York.
Auchterarder Muir Improvement Act 1860	23 & 24 Vict. c. cxix	3 July 1860
An Act to authorize the Improvement of the Common Muir of Auchterarder in the County of Perth, and to regulate the Management thereof, and the Application of the Revenues arising therefrom for the Benefit of that Burgh or Town.
Symington, Biggar and Broughton Railway (Extension) Act 1860	23 & 24 Vict. c. cxx	3 July 1860
An Act to enable the Symington, Biggar, and Broughton Railway Company to extend their Railway from Broughton to Peebles; and for other Purposes.
Portadown, Dungannon and Omagh Junction Railway Act 1860	23 & 24 Vict. c. cxxi	3 July 1860
An Act for enabling the Portadown, Dungannon, and Omagh Junction Railway Company to alter the Line of their Extension Railway, and to make a Branch Railway at Omagh; for authorizing certain Arrangements with the Ulster Railway Company and Londonderry and Enniskillen Railway Company; and for other Purposes.
Disley and Hayfield Railway Act 1860	23 & 24 Vict. c. cxxii	3 July 1860
An Act for making a Railway from the Stockport, Disley, and Whaley Bridge Railway in the Parish of Stockport and County of Chester to Hayfield in the County of Derby, and for other Purposes.
London and Blackwall Railway Act 1860	23 & 24 Vict. c. cxxiii	3 July 1860
An Act to enable the London and Blackwall Railway Company to provide additional Station Accommodation and other Works connected with their Railway; to make a Branch Railway to the London Docks; to enter into Arrangements with certain other Companies; and for other Purposes.
Salisbury and Yeovil Railway Deviation Act 1860	23 & 24 Vict. c. cxxiv	3 July 1860
An Act to enable the Salisbury and Yeovil Railway Company to make a Deviation from their authorized Main Line near Yeovil, and for other Purposes connected with their Undertaking.
Upper Mersey Dues Act 1860	23 & 24 Vict. c. cxxv	3 July 1860
An Act for vesting in a Body of Trustees, to be called "The Upper Mersey Dues Trustees," a certain Portion of the Liverpool Town and Anchorage Dues; and for other Purposes.
North and South Lanarkshire Turnpike Roads Act 1860	23 & 24 Vict. c. cxxvi	3 July 1860
An Act to continue and amend Two Acts, passed in the First (Note: Lanark and Dumbarton Roads and Bridges Act 1820 (1 Geo. 4. c. lxxxiv)) and Tenth (Note: Lanark and Dumbarton Roads and Bridges Act 1829 (10 Geo. 4. c. cxii)) Years of the Reign of His Majesty King George the Fourth, relating to certain Roads and Bridges in the Counties of Lanark and Dumbarton.
Hereford, Hay and Brecon Railway (Deviation) Act 1860	23 & 24 Vict. c. cxxvii	3 July 1860
An Act to enable the Hereford, Hay, and Brecon Railway Company to relinquish the Junction of their Line with the Shrewsbury and Hereford Railway, and in substitution therefor to form a Junction with the Newport, Abergavenny, and Hereford Railway.
Tenbury and Bewdley Railway Act 1860	23 & 24 Vict. c. cxxviii	3 July 1860
An Act for making a Railway from Tenbury in the County of Worcester to the Severn Valley Railway near Bewdley in the County of Worcester.
Buildings Improvement Act 1860	23 & 24 Vict. c. cxxix	3 July 1860
An Act to incorporate a Company for the Improvement of Buildings, and for other Purposes.
Dorset Central Railway Act 1860	23 & 24 Vict. c. cxxx	3 July 1860
An Act for extending the Time for the Completion of Portions of the Dorset Central Railway; for enabling the Somerset Central Railway Company to subscribe to the Undertaking; and for other Purposes.
Inverness and Ross-shire Railway Act 1860 (repealed)	23 & 24 Vict. c. cxxxi	3 July 1860
An Act for making a Railway from Inverness to Invergordon, to be called "The Inverness and Ross-shire Railway;" and for other Purposes. (Repealed by Highland Railway Act 1865 (28 & 29 Vict. c. clxviii))
Leeds Overseers Act 1860 (repealed)	23 & 24 Vict. c. cxxxii	3 July 1860
An Act to provide for Alterations in the Appointment of Overseers, Collectors, and other Poor Law Officers in the Township of Leeds; for the Incorporation of Overseers for specific Purposes; and for the levying and Collection of Poor Rates in that Township; and for other Purposes. (Repealed by Statute Law (Repeals) Act 2008 (c. 12))
Mid Wales Railway (Extensions) Act 1860	23 & 24 Vict. c. cxxxiii	3 July 1860
An Act to enable the Mid-Wales Railway Company to make a Deviation in their authorized Railway, and to construct Railways to connect their Railway with the Hereford, Hay, and Brecon, and the Brecon and Merthyr Junction Railways; and for other Purposes.
Port Carlisle and Silloth Railway Companies Act 1860	23 & 24 Vict. c. cxxxiv	3 July 1860
An Act to alter, amend, and extend the Powers of the Acts relating to the Port Carlisle Dock and Railway, and Carlisle and Silloth Bay Railway and Dock Companies; to enable the Port Carlisle Dock and Railway Company to raise additional Capital; to enable both or either of the said Companies to run over and use Portions of the Railways of the Newcastle-upon-Tyne and Carlisle Railway Company; to compel the Newcastle-upon-Tyne and Carlisle Railway Company to afford Facilities and Accommodation upon their Railways to the Traffic of the said Companies; and for other Purposes.
Swansea Harbour Act 1860	23 & 24 Vict. c. cxxxv	3 July 1860
An Act to extend the Period limited by "The Swansea Harbour Act, 1859," (Note: Swansea Harbour Act 1859 (22 & 23 Vict. c. xlvii)) for the Construction and Completion of the Works authorized by "The Swansea Harbour Act, 1854." (Note: Swansea Harbour Act 1854 (17 & 18 Vict. c. cxxvi))
Stockport, Disley and Whaley Bridge Railway (Capital) Act 1860	23 & 24 Vict. c. cxxxvi	3 July 1860
An Act to empower the Stockport, Disley, and Whaley Bridge Railway Company to raise additional Money; and for other Purposes connected with their Undertaking.
Abergavenny Improvement Act 1860	23 & 24 Vict. c. cxxxvii	3 July 1860
An Act for amending "The Abergavenny Improvement Act, 1854;" (Note: Abergavenny Improvement Act 1854 (17 & 18 Vict. c. xlix)) for enabling the Commissioners to construct Works, and supply their District with Water and Gas; and for other Purposes.
Marchburn, Kelso and Lauder Road Act 1860	23 & 24 Vict. c. cxxxviii	3 July 1860
An Act for renewing the Term and for more effectually repairing and maintaining the Road from the Marchburn, through Kelso in the County of Roxburgh, to Lauder in the County of Berwick, with a Branch from the said Road near Fansloanend in the County of Berwick, through the Village of Earlston, to the Roxburghshire Turnpike Road.
Oswestry and Newtown Railway (Porthywaen Branch) Act 1860	23 & 24 Vict. c. cxxxix	3 July 1860
An Act for making a Branch Railway from the Oswestry and Newtown Railway at Llynellys to the Porthywaen Lime Rocks in the County of Salop.
North British and Jedburgh Railways Amalgamation Act 1860	23 & 24 Vict. c. cxl	3 July 1860
An Act to amalgamate the Jedburgh Railway Company with the North British Railway Company, and for other Purposes.
Central Wales Extension Railway Act 1860	23 & 24 Vict. c. cxli	3 July 1860
An Act for making a Railway from Llandrindod in the County of Radnor to Llandovery in the County of Carmarthen, to be called "The Central Wales Extension Railway;" and for other Purposes.
Montrose and Bervie Railway Act 1860	23 & 24 Vict. c. cxlii	3 July 1860
An Act for making a Railway from the Royal Burgh of Bervie or Inverbervie in the County of Kincardine to the Montrose Branch of the Scottish North-eastern Railway in the County of Forfar, to be called "The Montrose and Bervie Railway."
Epping Railways (Dunmow Extension) Act 1860 (repealed)	23 & 24 Vict. c. cxliii	23 July 1860
An Act to extend the Epping Railways to Great Dunmow in the County of Essex. (Repealed by Eastern Counties Railway (Epping Lines) Act 1862 (25 & 26 Vict. c. clxxxvii))
Caledonian Railway (Branches) Act 1860	23 & 24 Vict. c. cxliv	23 July 1860
An Act to enable the Caledonian Railway Company to acquire, make, and maintain certain Branch Railways to Lanark and to the Douglas Mineral Field, and also to their Granton Branch.
West of Fife Mineral Railway (Kingseat Extension) Act 1860	23 & 24 Vict. c. cxlv	23 July 1860
An Act to enable the West of Fife Mineral Railway Company to extend the Kingseat Branch of their Railway; and for certain other Purposes.
Wimborne Minster and Blandford Forum Turnpike Road Act 1860	23 & 24 Vict. c. cxlvi	23 July 1860
An Act to repeal an Act of the First Year of the Reign of King William the Fourth, intituled "An Act for repairing the Road from Wimborne Minster to Blandford Forum in the County of Dorset," (Note: Wimborne Minster and Blandford Forum Road Act 1831 (1 Will. 4. c. ix)) and to make other Provisions in lieu thereof, and for other Purposes.
Hungerford Market and Charing Cross Bridge Act 1860	23 & 24 Vict. c. cxlvii	23 July 1860
An Act for the Transfer of the remaining Property of the Hungerford Market Company and the Charing Cross Bridge Company respectively to the Charing Cross Railway Company, and for the winding up of the Affairs and the Dissolution of the Hungerford Market Company and the Charing Cross Bridge Company respectively, and for other Purposes.
Swansea Local Board of Health Waterworks Act 1860	23 & 24 Vict. c. cxlviii	23 July 1860
An Act for enabling the Local Board of Health for the Town and District of Swansea to construct and maintain an improved System of Waterworks; and for other Purposes.
Conway and Llanrwst Railway Act 1860	23 & 24 Vict. c. cxlix	23 July 1860
An Act for making a Railway from the Chester and Holyhead Railway near Conway to Llanrwst.
Mersey Docks (Ferry Accommodation) Act 1860	23 & 24 Vict. c. cl	23 July 1860
An Act to enable the Mersey Docks and Harbour Board to erect Floating Bridges and other Works at Liverpool and Woodside, for improving the Communication between Liverpool and Birkenhead and for other purposes.
Watchet Harbour Act 1860	23 & 24 Vict. c. cli	23 July 1860
An Act for making better Provision for the Maintenance, Regulation, and Improvement of Watchet Harbour; and for other Purposes.
Wimbledon and Dorking Railway Act 1860	23 & 24 Vict. c. clii	23 July 1860
An Act to enable the Wimbledon and Dorking Railway Company to raise further Capital; and for other Purposes.
Kilkenny Junction Railway Act 1860	23 & 24 Vict. c. cliii	23 July 1860
An Act for making a Railway from the Waterford and Kilkenny Railway at Kilkenny to the Great Southern and Western Railway at Mountrath, and for other Purposes.
Everton, &c. Drainage Act 1860 (repealed)	23 & 24 Vict. c. cliv	23 July 1860
An Act to consolidate into One Act, and to amend, extend, and enlarge the Powers and Provisions of the several Acts for embanking and draining certain Low Lands and Grounds in the Parishes or Townships of Everton, Scaftworth, Gringley-on-the-Hill, Misterton, and Walkeringham in the County of Nottingham, and to make further and better Provision for such Embankment and Drainage. (Repealed by Everton, &c. Drainage Act 1912 (2 & 3 Geo. 5. c. x))
Kilrush and Kilkee Railway and Poulnasherry Reclamation Act 1860	23 & 24 Vict. c. clv	23 July 1860
An Act for making a Railway from Kilrush to Kilkee, and for embanking and reclaiming certain Waste Lands in the Estuary of Poulnasherry in the County of Clare.
Milford Haven Dock and Railway Act 1860	23 & 24 Vict. c. clvi	23 July 1860
An Act for authorizing the Construction of a Railway and Docks and other Works on the North Side of Milford Haven in the County of Pembroke, and for other Purposes.
Waveney Valley Railway Act 1860	23 & 24 Vict. c. clvii	23 July 1860
An Act for the Extension of the Waveney Valley Railway from Bungay to Beccles in Suffolk.
Epsom and Leatherhead Railway (South Western and Brighton) Act 1860	23 & 24 Vict. c. clviii	23 July 1860
An Act for authorizing the Transfer of the Epsom and Leatherhead Railway, and for other Purposes.
North British Railway (Stations) Act 1860	23 & 24 Vict. c. clix	23 July 1860
An Act to confer Powers on the North British Railway Company to enlarge their Station at Edinburgh, and with respect to the Carlisle Citadel Station.
Waterford and Limerick Railway Act 1860	23 & 24 Vict. c. clx	23 July 1860
An Act to enable the Waterford and Limerick Railway Company to construct a Tramway to the Market Place at Limerick, and a Railway with a Pier or Wharf in connexion therewith at their Terminus at Waterford; to raise additional Capital; and for other Purposes.
Llanelly Railway and Dock Act 1860	23 & 24 Vict. c. clxi	23 July 1860
An Act for authorizing a Lease in perpetuity of the Vale of Towy Railway to the Llanelly Railway and Dock Company, and for increasing the Capital of the Company, and for other Purposes.
Isle of Wight Eastern Section Railway Act 1860	23 & 24 Vict. c. clxii	23 July 1860
An Act for making Railways for the Purpose of connecting Ryde with Ventnor and the East Coast of the Isle of Wight, and for other Purposes.
Sudbury and Clare Railway Act 1860	23 & 24 Vict. c. clxiii	23 July 1860
An Act for making a Railway from Sudbury, through Melford, to Clare.
Denbigh, Ruthin and Corwen Railway Act 1860	23 & 24 Vict. c. clxiv	23 July 1860
An Act for making a Railway from the Vale of Clwyd Railway at Denbigh in the County of Denbigh to Corwen in the County of Merioneth, to be called "The Denbigh, Ruthin, and Corwen Railway."
Moy Navigation Amendment Act 1860	23 & 24 Vict. c. clxv	23 July 1860
An Act to repeal an Act, intituled "An Act for the Improvement of the Navigation of the River Moy in the Counties of Mayo and Sligo in Ireland," (Note: River Moy Navigation Act 1839 (2 & 3 Vict. c. lxxiii)) and to grant other and further Powers for the Improvement of the said Navigation.
Hayling Railways Act 1860	23 & 24 Vict. c. clxvi	23 July 1860
An Act for making Railways between the London, Brighton, and South Coast and Direct Portsmouth Railways and Hayling Ferry, and for other Purposes.
Bradford, Wakefield and Leeds Railway Act 1860	23 & 24 Vict. c. clxvii	23 July 1860
An Act to empower the Bradford, Wakefield, and Leeds Railway Company to construct a Railway to Ossett in the West Riding of the County of York; and for other Purposes.
Great Northern and Metropolitan Junction Railway Act 1860	23 & 24 Vict. c. clxviii	23 July 1860
An Act for making an improved Communication between the Great Northern Railway and the Metropolitan Railway near the King's Cross Station, and for authorizing certain Arrangements between the Great Northern and Metropolitan Railway Companies with reference thereto.
Land Loan and Enfranchisement Company's Act 1860 (repealed)	23 & 24 Vict. c. clxix	23 July 1860
An Act for incorporating and granting other Powers to "The Land Loan and Enfranchisement Company." (Repealed by Statute Law (Repeals) Act 1993 (c. 50))
Scottish Drainage and Improvement Company's Amendment Act 1860	23 & 24 Vict. c. clxx	23 July 1860
An Act to alter and amend "The Scottish Drainage and Improvement Company's Act, 1856." (Note: Scottish Drainage and Improvement Company's Act 1856 (19 & 20 Vict. c. lxx))
London, Brighton and South Coast Railway Act 1860 or the London, Brighton and South Coast Railway (Mid-Sussex Junction) Act 1860	23 & 24 Vict. c. clxxi	23 July 1860
An Act to enable the London, Brighton, and South Coast Railway Company to make certain Alterations in their Coast Lines and in the Line of the West End of London and Crystal Palace Railway, a new Channel for the River Arun, and other Works; and for other Purposes.
Mid Sussex and Midhurst Junction Railway Deviation Act 1860	23 & 24 Vict. c. clxxii	23 July 1860
An Act for enabling the Mid-Sussex and Midhurst Junction Railway Company to deviate a Portion of the authorized Line of the Mid-Sussex and Midhurst Junction Railway, 1859. (Note: Mid Sussex and Midhurst Junction Railway Act 1859 (22 & 23 Vict. c. cxxv))
Petersfield Railway Act 1860	23 & 24 Vict. c. clxxiii	23 July 1860
An Act for making a Railway from the Mid-Sussex and Midhurst Junction Railway to Petersfield in the County of Southampton.
West of London and Crystal Palace Railway (Transfer of Farnborough Extension and Dissolution of Company) Act 1860	23 & 24 Vict. c. clxxiv	23 July 1860
An Act for the Transfer of the Farnborough Extension Railway to the London, Chatham, and Dover Railway Company, and for the Dissolution of the West End of London and Crystal Palace Railway Company; and for other Purposes.
Manchester and Milford Railway Act 1860	23 & 24 Vict. c. clxxv	23 July 1860
An Act for making a Railway from Llanidloes in the County of Montgomery to Pencader in the County of Carmarthen, and for other Purposes.
Royal College of Surgeons of Edinburgh (Widows Fund) Act 1860 (repealed)	23 & 24 Vict. c. clxxvi	23 July 1860
An Act for consolidating the Acts relating to the Widows Fund of the Royal College of Surgeons of Edinburgh, for regulating the future Management of the said Fund, and for other Purposes. (Repealed by Statute Law (Repeals) Act 1998 (c. 43))
London, Chatham and Dover Railway (Metropolitan Extensions) Act 1860	23 & 24 Vict. c. clxxvii	6 August 1860
An Act for enabling the London, Chatham and Dover Railway Company to extend their Railway Communications to the Metropolis; and for other Purposes connected with their Undertaking.
Monkland Railways (Branches) Act 1860	23 & 24 Vict. c. clxxviii	6 August 1860
An Act to enable the Monkland Railways Company to make and maintain a Branch Railway to Shotts Ironworks, and certain other Branches and Works in the Counties of Lanark and Linlithgow; and for other Purposes.
Hay Railway Act 1860	23 & 24 Vict. c. clxxix	6 August 1860
An Act for vesting the Hay Railway in the Hereford, Hay, and Brecon Railway Company, and for dissolving the Hay Railway Company, and for other Purposes.
Horsham and Guildford Direct Railway Act 1860	23 & 24 Vict. c. clxxx	6 August 1860
An Act for making a Railway from the Mid-Sussex Railway to the Godalming Branch of the London and South-western Railway at Guildford, to be called "The Horsham and Guildford Direct Railway."
Macclesfield District Gas Act 1860 (repealed)	23 & 24 Vict. c. clxxxi	6 August 1860
An Act to confer upon the Local Board of Health for Macclesfield further Powers with reference to the Supply of Gas, and for other Purposes. (Repealed by Cheshire County Council Act 1980 (c. xiii))
Athenry and Tuam Railway (Leasing or Sale) Act 1860 (repealed)	23 & 24 Vict. c. clxxxii	6 August 1860
An Act to authorize the Lease or Sale of the Athenry and Tuam Railway to the Midland Great Western Railway of Ireland Company, and for other Purposes. (Repealed by Statute Law (Repeals) Act 2013 (c. 2))
Bedford and Cambridge Railway Act 1860	23 & 24 Vict. c. clxxxiii	6 August 1860
An Act for establishing Railway Communication between Bedford and Cambridge, and for other Purposes.
Lincoln's Inn Act 1860	23 & 24 Vict. c. clxxxiv	6 August 1860
An Act for confirming with certain Variations an Agreement made in the Year 1682 between the Masters of the Bench of the Honourable Society of Lincoln's Inn and Henry Serle Esquire, and for the future Government and Regulation of Serle's Court, now commonly called New Square, Lincoln's Inn.
South Western Railway (General) Act 1860	23 & 24 Vict. c. clxxxv	6 August 1860
An Act for authorizing the London and South-western Railway Company to alter their Kingston Bridge Line; and for authorizing divers Arrangements between them and other Companies; and for other Purposes.
Wigan Waterworks Act 1860	23 & 24 Vict. c. clxxxvi	6 August 1860
An Act for enabling the Local Board of Health for the Borough of Wigan to abandon a Portion of their Waterworks, and to construct and maintain other Waterworks; and for other Purposes.
London, Chatham and Dover Railway (Capital) Act 1860	23 & 24 Vict. c. clxxxvii	6 August 1860
An Act for the Creation of Capital Stocks and Debenture Stock of the London, Chatham, and Dover Railway Company, and for other Purposes.
Llangollen and Corwen Railway Act 1860	23 & 24 Vict. c. clxxxviii	6 August 1860
An Act for making a Railway from Llangollen in the County of Denbigh to Corwen in the County of Merioneth, and for other Purposes.
Highbridge Markets and Gas Act 1860	23 & 24 Vict. c. clxxxix	6 August 1860
An Act for providing and constructing Markets, Market Places, and Slaughter-houses, with all necessary Conveniences, within the Parishes of Burnham and Huntspill in the County of Somerset, and for supplying and lighting with Gas the Town or Hamlet of Highbridge and the Parishes or Places adjacent, all in the County of Somerset.
River Fergus Navigation and Embankment Act 1860	23 & 24 Vict. c. cxc	6 August 1860
An Act for improving the Navigation of the River Fergus, and the embanking and reclaiming from the Sea of Waste Lands subject to be overflowed by the Tide on the Eastern and Western Sides of the River in the County of Clare.
Burnham Tidal Harbour Act 1860	23 & 24 Vict. c. cxci	6 August 1860
An Act for converting Part of the River Brue into a Tidal Harbour, for making a Quay or Landing Place at Burnham in the County of Somerset, for regulating the Access thereto, and for other Purposes.
Aylesbury and Buckingham Railway Act 1860	23 & 24 Vict. c. cxcii	6 August 1860
An Act for making a Railway from the Town of Aylesbury to join the Buckinghamshire Railway at or near the Claydon Junction, to be called "The Aylesbury and Buckingham Railway," and for other Purposes.
Metropolitan Meat and Poultry Market Act 1860	23 & 24 Vict. c. cxciii	13 August 1860
An Act to establish at Smithfield in the City of London a Metropolitan Market for Meat, Poultry, and other Provisions; and for other Purposes connected therewith.
Land Loan and Enfranchisement Company's Act 1860 (Mistake Rectifying) Act 1860 (repealed)	23 & 24 Vict. c. cxciv	13 August 1860
An Act to rectify a Mistake in an Act of the present Session, "for incorporating and granting other Powers to 'The Land Loan and Enfranchisement Company.'" (Note: Land Loan and Enfranchisement Company's Act 1860 (23 & 24 Vict. c. clxix)) (Repealed by Statute Law (Repeals) Act 1993 (c. 50))
North British and Border Counties Railways Amalgamation Act 1860	23 & 24 Vict. c. cxcv	13 August 1860
An Act to authorise the Amalgamation of the Border Counties Railway Company with the North British Railway Company; and for other Purposes.
Faringdon Railway Act 1860	23 & 24 Vict. c. cxcvi	13 August 1860
An Act for making a Railway from the Great Western Railway to the Town of Faringdon, to be called "The Faringdon Railway."
London Railway Depôt and Storehouses Act 1860	23 & 24 Vict. c. cxcvii	13 August 1860
An Act for forming a new Street and Railway to connect the Metropolitan Railway with the proposed Meat Market at Smithfield in the City of London, with a Depôt and Storehouses, and for other Purposes.
Hamilton and Strathaven Railway (Amendment) Act 1860	23 & 24 Vict. c. cxcviii	20 August 1860
An Act to enable the Hamilton and Strathaven Railway Company to create Preference Shares; to extend the Time for completing their Line; and for other Purposes.
Forest of Dean Central Railway Act 1860	23 & 24 Vict. c. cxcix	20 August 1860
An Act to extend the Time for the Completion of the Forest of Dean Central Railway, and for other Purposes.
Athenry and Ennis Junction Railway Act 1860	23 & 24 Vict. c. cc	20 August 1860
An Act for making a Railway from the Midland Great Western Railway of Ireland to the Limerick and Ennis Railway, to be called "The Athenry and Ennis Junction Railway," and for other Purposes.
Caithness Roads Act 1860 (repealed)	23 & 24 Vict. c. cci	20 August 1860
An Act for more effectually making, maintaining, and keeping in repair the Highways, Roads, and Bridges within the County of Caithness, and for other Purposes. (Repealed by Wick Burgh Extension Order Confirmation Act 1902 (2 Edw. 7. c. cclii))
Galway Harbour Act 1860	23 & 24 Vict. c. ccii	28 August 1860
An Act to revive some of the Powers of "The Galway Harbour and Port Act, 1853," (Note: Galway Harbour and Port Act 1853 (16 & 17 Vict. c. ccvii)) and to confer additional Powers on the Galway Harbour Commissioners; and for other Purposes.
West Cork Railways Act 1860	23 & 24 Vict. c. cciii	28 August 1860
An Act to incorporate a Company for making Railways in the West Part of the County of Cork, and for other Purposes.

=== Private acts ===
Short title	Citation	Royal assent
Long title
Boschetti's Estate Act 1860	23 & 24 Vict. c. 1 Pr.	6 August 1860
An Act for the Sale of certain Estates at Gibraltar held on the Trusts of the Will of John Maria Boschetti deceased, and for the Investment of the Proceeds thereof in this Country.
Daniel Stewart's Hospital (Edinburgh) Act 1860 (repealed)	23 & 24 Vict. c. 2 Pr.	6 August 1860
An Act to incorporate the Governors of the Hospital in Edinburgh founded by Daniel Stewart, and to amend and explain his Trust settlement. (Repealed by Edinburgh Merchant Company Endowments Order Confirmation Act 1909 (9 Edw. 7. c. cxi))
Brandon's Estate Act 1860	23 & 24 Vict. c. 3 Pr.	13 August 1860
An Act for the better leasing of the Walworth Manor Estate in the Parish of Newington in the County of Surrey to the respective Trustees of the Wills of Samuel Brandon deceased and Thomas Brandon deceased, and for Exchanges and a Partition and other Purposes.
Lord De Freyne's Estate Act 1860	23 & 24 Vict. c. 4 Pr.	13 August 1860
An Act for the Sale of the Settled Estates in the Counties of Sligo and Galway of John Lord De Freyne, and for the Purchase of Estates in the County of Roscommon, to be limited to the Uses of those Settled Estates.
Beauchamp Charity Act 1860	23 & 24 Vict. c. 5 Pr.	20 August 1860
An Act to enable the Trustees of Lord Beauchamp's Charity to purchase the Right of Nomination to the Chapelry of Newland in the County of Worcester, and to vest in them the Site of the Church or Chapel of Newland.
Domvile Estate Act 1860	23 & 24 Vict. c. 6 Pr.	20 August 1860
An Act for granting further Power to lease for Building and Improving Purposes certain Parts of the Estates situate in the County of Dublin of Sir Charles Compton William Domvile Baronet, and to accept Surrenders of Leases of such Portions of the said Estates, and for other Purposes.
Norfolk Estates Act 1860	23 & 24 Vict. c. 7 Pr.	20 August 1860
An Act to vary or extend certain borrowing Powers contained in the Settlement of the Duke of Norfolk's Estates, and for other Purposes.
Earl of Longford's Estate Act 1860	23 & 24 Vict. c. 8 Pr.	20 August 1860
An Act for amending the Powers of Leasing contained in the Will of the Right Honourable Edward Michael late Earl of Longford and Baron Silchester deceased, and for other Purposes.
Viscount Lorton's Estate Act 1860	23 & 24 Vict. c. 9 Pr.	20 August 1860
An Act for authorizing the raising of Money for Payment of Incumbrances on the Estates in the Counties of Roscommon and Sligo and Queen's County of which the Right Honourable Robert Viscount Lorton is Tenant for Life in Possession, by Mortgage instead of Sale.
Naturalization of Charles, Caroline and Elena Giustiniani Act 1860 (Note: This act was not printed by the Queen's Printer.)	23 & 24 Vict. c. 10 Pr.	20 August 1860
An Act for naturalizing Charles Maria Joseph Livy Anthony James Joachim Levingstone Bandini Giustiniani Caroline Maria Elena Gioacchina Bandini Giustiniani, and Elena Maria Concetta Isabella Gioacchina Guiseppa Bandini Giustiniani, the infant Children of Sigismund Nicholas Venantius Gaietano Francis Bandini Giustiniani Esquire, commonly called Viscount Kynnaird Marquess Bandini in the Roman States, the only Son and Heir Apparent of Maria Cecilia Agatha Anna Josepha Laurentia Donata Melchiora Balthassara Gaspara Countess of Newburgh.

=== Sources ===
- A Collection of the Public General Statutes. London: Eyre & Spottiswoode. 1860 – via Google Books.
- Journals of the House of Commons (PDF). Vol. 115. London: His Majesty's Stationery Office. pp. 3–510 – via parliament.uk.
- Chronological Table of and Index to the Statutes. Vol. 1: To the End of the Session 59 Vict. Sess. 2 (1895) (13th ed.). London: Her Majesty's Stationery Office. 1896. pp. 393–399 – via Google Books.

== See also ==
- List of acts of the Parliament of the United Kingdom
