= Powers of Trustees, Mortgagees, etc. Act 1860 =

Act of the Parliament of the United Kingdom

- Act of Parliament
- Parliament of the United Kingdom
- Long title: An Act to give to Trustees, Mortgagees, and others certain Powers now commonly inserted in Settlements, Mortgages, and Wills.
- Citation: 23 & 24 Vict. c. 145
- Territorial extent: England and Wales; Ireland; (Note: Section 35.)

Dates
- Royal assent: 28 August 1860
- Commencement: 28 August 1860 (Note: Section 34.)
- Repealed: 1 January 1883
Other legislation
Repealed by	Conveyancing Act 1881; Settled Land Act 1882

Status: Repealed

Text of statute as originally enacted

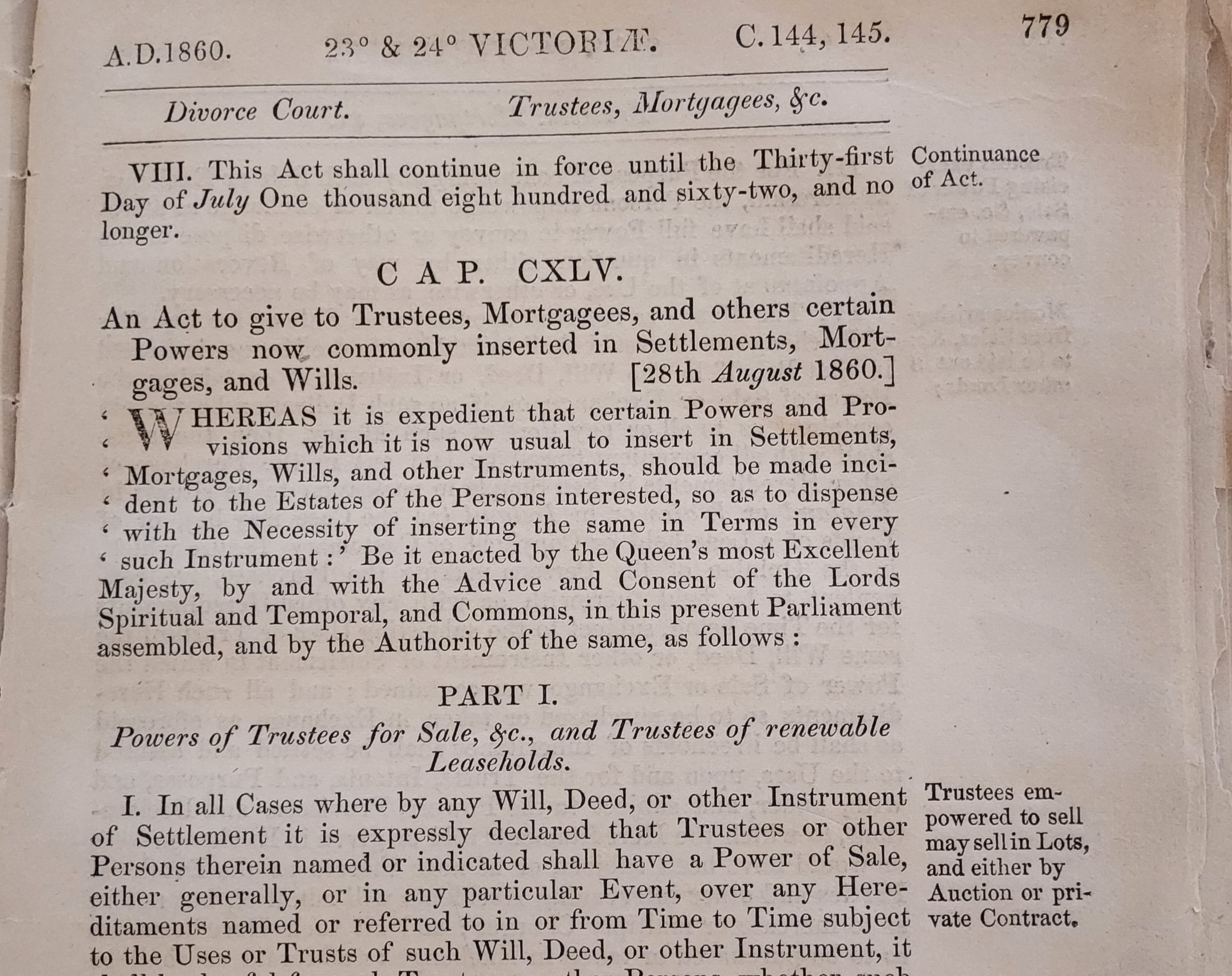
Lord Cranworth's Act 1860.

The Powers of Trustees, Mortgagees, etc. Act 1860 (23 & 24 Vict. c. 145), sometimes referred to as the Lord Cranworth's Act 1860, was an act of the Parliament of the United Kingdom.

The act sought to formalise and regularise various provisions commonly included by chancery lawyers of the day in mortgages, wills and other settlements.

It is the first statute in English law to refer to receivers. It was sponsored by the Lord Chancellor, Lord Cranworth. Section 11 of the Act implied a term into each mortgage instrument for the appointment of a receiver or the exercise of a power of sale as an alternative to foreclosure.

== Subsequent developments ==
Parts II and II of the act were repealed by section 71(1) of, and part III of the second schedule to, the Conveyancing Act 1881 (44 & 45 Vict. c. 41), which came into force on 31 December 1881.

Parts I and IV of the act were repealed by section 64(1) of, and the schedule to, the Settled Land Act 1882 (45 & 46 Vict. c. 38), which came into force on 1 January 1883, with savings in section 64(2).

== Bibliography ==
- Halsbury's Statutes
- Langley, Albert Gordon. A Reading of the Act 23 & 24 Vict cap 145. London. 1861. See catalogues such as Horace Cox and Faculty of Advocates. Reviewed at (1862) 37 The Law Times 332. Serialised at (1861) 36 The Law Times 2, 28, 68, 80, 103, 115, 186, 318, 332, 344, 402, 427, 438, 501, 523, 583, 593.
- "Art VIII - Lord Cranworth's Trustees and Mortgagees Act" (1860) 10 Law Magazine and Law Review 118
- "The Trustees and Mortgagees Act (23 & 24 Vic c 145)" (1861) 1 Law Students' Examination Chronicle 70
- Carson and Bompas. "Trustees and Mortgagees Act". Shelford's Real Property Statutes. Ninth Edition. Sweet and Maxwell. Stevens and Sons. London. 1893. Pages 558 to 565. Carson. Eighth Edition. 1874. Pages 731 to 741. Shelford, Leonard. The Real Property Statutes. Seventh Edition. 1863. Pages 699 to 708.
- Paterson, William (ed). "Trustees, Mortgagees, &c Act". The Practical Statutes of the Session 1860. John Crockford. London. 1860. Pages 377 to 387.
