= Settled Land Acts =

English laws concerning family property

The Settled Land Acts were a series of English land law enactments concerning the limits of creating a settlement, a conveyancing device used by a property owner who wants to ensure that provision of future generations of his family.

== Two main types of settlement ==
- Under a trust for sale, the property, which can be real or personal (land or goods), is transferred by the owner by deed or will to trustees who are obliged to sell the property and hold the proceeds of sale for the beneficiaries.
- A strict settlement can only be created over land and it was a device which was used by a landowner to keep the land within his family.

By using the device of the strict settlement the ownership of the property was divided over time by using limited freehold estates.

== Strict settlements as limited freehold estates ==
- A fee tail is a limited estate with succession confined to the direct descendants of the original grantor of the estate – descendant determined according to ancient heirship rules which leaned in favour of the eldest son.
- A life estate is an estate to last someone's lifetime, either the grantee's lifetime or the lifetime of someone else – a life estate pur autre vie. These estates were used in the creation of a strict settlement.

The most common example of strict settlement occurs where a landowner provides in his will that the land is to go to his eldest son as tenant for life and then the remainder is to pass to his son's eldest son, as tenant in tail, in fee tail.

The strict settlement meant that the land was effectively inalienable by the tenant in possession, but must pass to the tenant in tail; but that the fruits and income of the land were under the control of the tenant in possession, and could not be claimed by the 'tenant in tail. It follows that the tenant in tail, on coming of age, had a strong incentive to agree to convert his interest in the estate to that of a 'tenant for life', so having access to an income from the land as specified in the terms of the settlement. Such an agreement - termed 'resettlement'- commonly renewed once a generation as each tenant in tail came of age. Following each resettlement then, the former tenant in possession remained with control over the estate, the former tenant in tail now became a tenant for life with an assured income from the estate, and the eventual oldest son of the now tenant for life became the tenant in tail. At the same time, each resettlement, also commonly renewed provision for jointures to be paid from the estate for widows, portions from the estate for younger sons education and marriage, and doweries from the estate for daughters; while also specifying indirect inheritance of the estate in the event of failure of the new tenant for life to produce a male heir. The resettlement also provided a once-in-a-generation opportunity to balance income from the estate with settled outgoing payments, through mortgages or land transactions that would not be possible once the resettled entail came into force.

== Disadvantages of strict settlements ==
- The eldest son could not sell the land.
- It was not feasible to grant a long lease of the property.
- He often could not even open and work any mines on the land himself as the laws of waste apply to life estates and they provide that you cannot open new mines unless you are unimpeachable for waste. Even if he was unimpeachable for waste he would often not have the money to open them. This meant that the optimum benefit could not be obtained from the land and meant that many landowners became impoverished.
- The life tenant would have to pay the widow her annuity and the other children their portions.
- It was difficult to mortgage the land.
- Land could be mismanaged and fall into severe disrepair.
- These difficulties were compounded by the fact that very often the settlement would continue on ad infinitum through the process of resettlement. The son's eldest son who was entitled to the fee tail could by barring the entail create a fee simple and bring the settlement to an end. He was not entitled to his interest in possession until his father died. While his father lived he could not bar the entail unless his father consented to it. His father would be reluctant to give his consent as this would mean the land would pass outside the family. Obviously the son would be in need of money to sustain him until he became entitled in possession. A compromise would be reached which would enable the land to remain in the family but at the same time satisfy the son's need for cash. The father and son would bar the entail but there would be a resettlement of the land which usually took the form of a conveyance to the father for life, to the eldest son for life remainder to his eldest son in tail; the fee tail was passed back another generation. As part of the settlement the eldest son would be granted an immediate annuity on the land or a lump sum. If the family fell on hard times, these resettlements meant that the deterioration of the land and the impoverishment of the landowners continued for generation after generation.

== Legislation ==
Settled Land Act 1882 (Note: Section 1(1).)
- Act of Parliament
- Parliament of the United Kingdom
- Long title: An Act for facilitating sales, leases, and other dispositions of settled land, and for promoting the execution of improvements thereon.
- Citation: 45 & 46 Vict. c. 38
- Territorial extent: England and Wales; Scotland; Ireland; (Note: Section 1(3).)

Dates
- Royal assent: 10 August 1882
- Commencement: 1 January 1883 (Note: Section 1(2).)
- Repealed: Scotland: 28 November 2004 (Note: The Abolition of Feudal Tenure etc. (Scotland) Act 2000 (Commencement No. 2) (Appointed Day) Order 2003 (SSI 2003/456).)
Other legislation
Amends	Powers of Trustees, Mortgagees, etc. Act 1860; Improvement of Land Act 1864; Settled Estates Act 1877
Amended by	Settled Land Act 1884; Settled Land Acts (Amendment) Act 1887; Settled Land Act 1889; Improvement of Land Act 1899; Law of Property Act 1922; Law of Property (Amendment) Act 1924; Settled Land Act 1925; Judicature (Northern Ireland) Act 1978; Roads (Scotland) Act 1984; Statute Law (Repeals) Act 1993; Trustee Act (Northern Ireland) 2001
Repealed by	Scotland: Abolition of Feudal Tenure etc. (Scotland) Act 2000

Status: Repealed

Text of statute as originally enacted

Settled Land Act 1884 (Note: Section 1.)
- Act of Parliament
- Parliament of the United Kingdom
- Long title: An Act to amend the Settled Land Act, 1882.
- Citation: 47 & 48 Vict. c. 18
- Territorial extent: United Kingdom

Dates
- Royal assent: 3 July 1884
- Commencement: 3 July 1884 (Note: The Acts of Parliament (Commencement) Act 1793.)
- Repealed: England and Wales: 1 January 1926
Other legislation
Amends	Settled Land Act 1882
Amended by	Law of Property Act 1922
Repealed by	England and Wales: Settled Land Act 1925

Status: Repealed

Text of statute as originally enacted

Settled Land Acts (Amendment) Act 1887 (Note: Section 3.)
- Act of Parliament
- Parliament of the United Kingdom
- Long title: An Act to amend the Settled Land Act (1882).
- Citation: 50 & 51 Vict. c. 30
- Territorial extent: United Kingdom

Dates
- Royal assent: 23 August 1887
- Commencement: 23 August 1887
- Repealed: England and Wales: 1 January 1926
Other legislation
Amends	Settled Land Act 1882
Repealed by	England and Wales: Settled Land Act 1925

Status: Repealed

Text of statute as originally enacted

Settled Land Act 1889
- Act of Parliament
- Parliament of the United Kingdom
- Long title: An Act to amend the Settled Land Act, 1882.
- Citation: 52 & 53 Vict. c. 36
- Territorial extent: United Kingdom

Dates
- Royal assent: 12 August 1889
- Commencement: 12 August 1889
- Repealed: England and Wales: 1 January 1926
Other legislation
Amends	Settled Land Act 1882
Amended by	Law of Property Act 1922; Law of Property (Amendment) Act 1924
Repealed by	England and Wales: Settled Land Act 1925

Status: Repealed

Text of statute as originally enacted

Settled Land Act 1890
- Act of Parliament
- Parliament of the United Kingdom
- Long title: An Act to amend the Settled Land Acts, 1882 to 1889.
- Citation: 53 & 54 Vict. c. 69
- Territorial extent: United Kingdom

Dates
- Royal assent: 18 August 1890
- Commencement: 18 August 1890
- Repealed: England and Wales: 1 January 1926; Scotland: 28 November 2004 (Note: The Abolition of Feudal Tenure etc. (Scotland) Act 2000 (Commencement No. 2) (Appointed Day) Order 2003.)
Other legislation
Amends	Settled Land Act 1882; Housing of the Working Classes Act 1885
Amended by	Statute Law Revision Act 1908; Statute Law Revision Act 1948; Trustee Act 1893; Law of Property Act 1922; Law of Property (Amendment) Act 1924
Repealed by	England and Wales: Settled Land Act 1925; Scotland: Abolition of Feudal Tenure etc. (Scotland) Act 2000

Status: Repealed

Text of statute as originally enacted

Revised text of statute as amended

- Mining Leases Act 1723 (10 Geo. 1. c. 6 (I.))
- Incumbered Estates (Ireland) Act 1849 (12 & 13 Vict. c. 77)
- Settled Land Act 1882 (45 & 46 Vict. c. 38)
- Settled Land Act 1884 (47 & 48 Vict. c. 18)
- Settled Land Acts (Amendment) Act 1887 (50 & 51 Vict. c. 30)
- Settled Land Act 1889 (52 & 53 Vict. c. 36)
- Settled Land Act 1890 (53 & 54 Vict. c. 69)
- Settled Land Act 1925 (15 & 16 Geo. 5. c. 18)
- Law of Property Act 1925 (15 & 16 Geo. 5. c. 20)
- Trusts of Land and Appointment of Trustees Act 1996 (c. 47)

The primary aim of the Settled Land Acts 1882 to 1890 was, as Lord Halsbury stated in Bruce v. Ailesbury [1892] AC 356, "to release the land from the fetters of the settlement – to render it a marketable article not withstanding the settlement".

The legislation achieved this by giving the tenant for life statutory powers to deal with the land which far exceeded the powers he had previously under common law. The most important of these powers was the power of the tenant for life to sell the fee simple interest in the land and not just a life estate pur autre vie.

Second aim of the legislation was to protect the interests of the beneficiaries under the settlement. Their interests were over-reached i.e. they detached from the land and became attached to the proceeds of sale instead, their interests shifted to the money – i.e. the settlement now applied to the proceeds of sale.

The acts apply whenever there is a settlement.

A settlement is defined by s2(1) of the 1882 act as "any land or any estate or interest in land, which stands for the time being limited to or in trust for any persons by way of succession".

Basically, whenever a document creates a succession of interests in land the Settled Land Acts will apply.

Generally there must be an element of succession. Section 59 creates one situation of settled land where there is no element of succession – where an infant is entitled in possession to land it is deemed to be settled land even though it may not be limited by way of succession i.e. he might he entitled to a fee simple. This was to ensure the commerciability of land owned by a minor as a purchaser would be reluctant to sign a contract with him given that it was voidable once the minor reached the age of majority.

Generally it is the tenant for life who exercises the powers created by the acts

The acts ensures that the powers created are available whenever there is a settlement by designating in every possible case one person to be the tenant for life.

Section 25 of the 1882 act defines the tenant for life as "the person who is for the time being, under a settlement, beneficially entitled to possession of settled land, for his life…" – usually the person entitled to the life estate in possession or entitled to the fee tail in possession.

=== Collective title ===
The Settled Land Acts 1882 to 1890 is the collective title of the following acts:

- The Settled Land Act 1882 (45 & 46 Vict. c. 38)
- The Settled Land Act 1884 (47 & 48 Vict. c. 18)
- The Settled Land Acts (Amendment) Act 1887 (50 & 51 Vict. c. 30)
- The Settled Land Act 1889 (52 & 53 Vict. c. 36)
- The Settled Land Act 1890 (53 & 54 Vict. c. 69)

== Where powers conferred do not apply ==
There are two scenarios where the tenant for life does not exercise the powers conferred by the Act.

- Where the person entitled in possession is an infant in which case under s.60 the trustees of the settlement exercise the powers.
- The other exception is where the tenant wishes to exercise his power of sale but he wishes to buy the fee simple (so he wishes to buy it from himself) – under S12 of the 1890 Act the trustees of the settlement step into his shoes and exercise the power of sale on his behalf.

Under s.50(1) the powers of the tenant for life cannot be assigned to another and s.50(2) renders void any contract under which the tenant for life agrees not to exercise his statutory powers. Also, the settlor cannot through the provisions of the settlement curtail either directly or indirectly the powers of the tenant for life under the Acts. Any provision attempting to do so will be void under s.51 of the 1882 Act

An example of an indirect attempt to curtail the exercise of the powers is found In re Fitzgerald 1902 IR 162

Section 56(1) provides that where there is a conflict between the provisions of a settlement and the provisions of the Act in relation to his powers where the settlement is more restrictive, the provisions of the Act will prevail.

Note: section 57 provides that nothing in the acts prevent a settlor from conferring on the tenant for life any powers additional to those conferred by the act.

== Controls ==
Three controls were incorporated into the legislation to prevent the tenant for life abusing his powers:

=== Regard to interests of other parties ===
A s 53 tenant for life must "have regard to the interests of all parties entitled under the settlement." He is required to have regard to the interests of the beneficiaries but he is not the same as the usual trustee since he is always one of the beneficiaries. In Re Earl of Stamford and Warrington (1916) 1 Ch Younger J described the tenant for life as a "highly interested" trustee.

"He may legitimately exercise his powers with some, but not of course, an exclusive regard for his own personal interests" – per Vaisey J in Re Boston's Will Trusts 1956 Ch 395.

He is entitled to a certain measure of discretion, Wheelwright v. Walker [1883] 23 Ch. 752 and Wheelwright v. Walker [1883] Weekly Reporter 912.

Under s 37 of the 1882 Act the tenant for life has the power to sell heirlooms so long as he gets a court order – Re Earl of Radnor's Will Trusts 1890 45 Ch D402.

Where land is involved the court will only intervene if the exercise of the power would financially affect the beneficiaries e.g. Re Earl Somers 1895 11 TLR 567.

However where the financial loss is only speculative the court will not intervene as in Thomas v. Williams 1883 24 Ch D 558.

One other situation where the courts will intervene is where the transaction is not bona fide or seems to involve an element of fraud, Middlemas v. Stevens (1901) 1 Ch.

=== Role of trustees ===
This is the role played by the trustees of the settlement.

=== Powers not equivalent to ownership ===
The powers are not equivalent to the powers of an absolute owner. Limits and restrictions are put on them by the legislation.

== Specific powers ==
=== Sell/exchange ===
Under s.3 of the 1882 act the life tenant has the power to sell or exchange land or any part of it or any interest right or privilege of any kind over or in relation to it. A restriction is imposed by s 4 which provides that in selling "he must obtain the best price that can be reasonably obtained".

Also certain procedures must be followed. Once these procedures are followed, on a sale by the tenant for life the purchaser receives the fee simple absolute in the land freed from all the interests attaching to it under the settlement. The interests under the settlement are over-reached i.e. shifted to the proceeds of sale.

Under s.45(3) the purchaser, if he is dealing in good faith with the tenant for life, is not required to satisfy himself that the requisite notice has been given to the trustees. Over-reaching will still apply so long as the purchaser is acting in good faith even if this procedural requirement is not followed. In Hughes v. Fanagan (1891) 30 LR IR the court held that when a lessee under a 35-year lease granted by the tenant for life knew that there were not trustees of the settlement he was not granted the protection of S45(3). Another of the procedural requirements is that the sale proceeds or the capital money must be paid to the trustees of the settlements or into court – s22 of the 1882 Act.

Under s.54 on a sale, exchange, lease or mortgage a bona fide purchaser/lessee/ mortgagee shall if dealing in good faith with the tenant for life, be conclusively taken, as against the beneficiaries of the settlement, as having paid the best price that could reasonably be obtained and to have complied with all requisitions under the acts.

See obiter comments made by Black J in Gilmore v. The O'Conor Don 1947 IR 462

=== To lease the land ===
Section 6 allows a tenant for life to lease the land or any part of it. The lease will last for the full term even if the tenant for life dies before its termination.

There are certain conditions and restrictions –

- There are maximum limits on the lengths of such leases
  - Building leases could only be granted for 99 years.
  - Mining leases could only be granted for 60 years.
  - Other leases could only be granted for 35 years.
- Section 7 laid out certain requirements – the lease had to be made by deed and must come into effect in possession within 12 months of its date
- Every lease must reserve the best rent that can reasonably be obtained
- Every lease must contain a covenant by the lessee for payment of the rent and a condition for re-entry in the event of the rent remaining unpaid for a period not exceeding 30 days.
- A counterpart of the lease had to executed by the lessee and delivered to the tenant for life
- Notice must be given to the trustees of the settlement before the lease is granted – s.45. However under S7 of the 1890 Act the tenant for life can grant a lease for under 21 years provided a fine is not payable, the lessee is not exempted for liability for waste and it reserves the best rent that can reasonably be obtained without giving notice and notwithstanding the fact that there are no trustees of the settlement.

The general rule laid down in Re Wix 1916 1Ch is that the rent reserved in leases is to be treated as part of the tenant's income from the land. It is never capitalised i.e. put by for the other beneficiaries.

The 1882 act makes an exception in the case of mining leases as the capital value of the land will be diminished by the mining – s 11 provides that unless a contrary intention is expressed in the settlement part of the rent is to be set aside as capital money and the rest goes to the tenant as income. If the tenant for life is impeachable for waste ¾ of the rent is capitalised if he is unimpeachable ¼ of the rent is capitalised.

=== To mortgage ===
The Settled Land Acts did not radically change the tenant for life's power to mortgage.

Under s.18 he can mortgage the land if money is required for equality of exchange, to buy out the ground rent or to raise money to discharge incumbrances of a permanent nature. Any money raised by the mortgage is treated as capital money and under s.22 must be paid to the trustees or into court. Even in these instances s.53 still applies.

See: Hampden v. Earl of Buckinghamshire 1893 CH 53.

=== To carry out improvements ===
Improvements are expenditures over and above day to day expenses e.g. repairs which he must pay for himself. See s.25 of the 1882 Act and s.13 of the 1890 Act.

The improvements can only be made out of capital money and cannot become a charge on the settlement – Standing v. Grey 1903 1 IR 49.

=== Other miscellaneous powers ===
Other miscellaneous powers conferred on the tenant are more restrictive e.g. under s.10(2) of the 1890 Act the Principal Mansion house and its grounds cannot be sold, exchanged or leased by the tenant for life without the consent of the trustees of the settlement or an order of the court. Under s.37 of the 1882 Act heirlooms such as family pictures, antiques cannot be sold without an order of the court.

== Trustees of the settlement ==
The role of the trustees is mainly supervisory. They generally have no powers to actively deal with the land as these powers are vested in the tenant for life. The trustees of the settlement have a more active role in two scenarios –

- Where the tenant for life is an infant, in which case the trustees can exercise that role for him until he reaches the age of majority- s.60 1882 Actor
- Where the tenant for life wishes to buy the fee simple the trustees must step into his shoes and exercise the power of sale for him – s.12 1890 Act

Section 2(8) of the 1882 Act as supplemented by s.16 of the 1890 Act identifies 5 categories of persons who qualify as trustees of the settlement:

- Trustees identified with a power of sale or a power to consent to the sale of settled land.
- Persons named in the settlement as trustees of the settlement "for the purposes of the Settled land Acts 1882–1890" – s2(8)

Categories provided by s16 of the 1890 act:

- Section 16(1) -the trustees will be the trustees with a power of sale of other land which is subject to the same limitations as the settled land in question e.g. if a settlement includes two farms but trustees are only given a power to sell one then they will be the trustees of the settlement in relation to the other farm.
- Section 16(2) – the trustees who have a future power of sale.
- The court may appoint trustees of the settlement under s.38(1) of the 1882 Act.

=== Powers of the trustees of the settlement ===
The legislation provided for trustees of the settlement to guard against financial mismanagement by the tenant in possession. Formerly the tenant in possession had himself been the trustee of the estate for the eventual tenant in tail; and this had commonly led to litigation by remaindermen against the tenant in possession over actions on the land that one party considered as 'waste', while the other proposed as 'improvement'; especially when the tenant in tail specified in the settlement was yet unborn, and a distant relative claimed as remainderman.

The role of the trustees of the settlement was created to ensure that the tenant for life in exercising his statutory powers does not harm the interests of the other beneficiaries under the settlement. Hughes v. Fanagan 1891 30 LR IR: the main aim of the trustees of the settlement is to protect the interests of those entitled in remainder.

To enable them to achieve this aim the legislation imposed 3 statutory requirements – they are required to receive the capital money, they are required to receive notice and to consent

- Under s 22(2) the capital money paid to the trustees must be invested or applied by them in accordance with the direction of the tenant for life or if no direction is given at their own discretion.
- S21 lists the various ways in which the money can be invested or applied. Court will only intervene if the investment plan clearly harms the financial interests of other beneficiaries under the settlement – Re Hunt's Settled estates 1906 2 Ch 11. Notice – under s 45 the major powers conferred by the acts on the tenant for life can only be exercised by him if he gives one months notice to the trustees. It is usually sent by registered post.
- Note the trustees are under no obligation to bring an action. Under S42 they can not be held liable for failing to give a consent or failing to bring an action.

Consents – some transactions such as the sale of the principal mansion house will require the consent of the trustees – sale of the mansion house s.10(2). This can be given informally without the need for writing as per Gilbey v. Rush 1 Ch 11.

== See also ==
- English trusts law
- English land law
