= Registered land in English law =

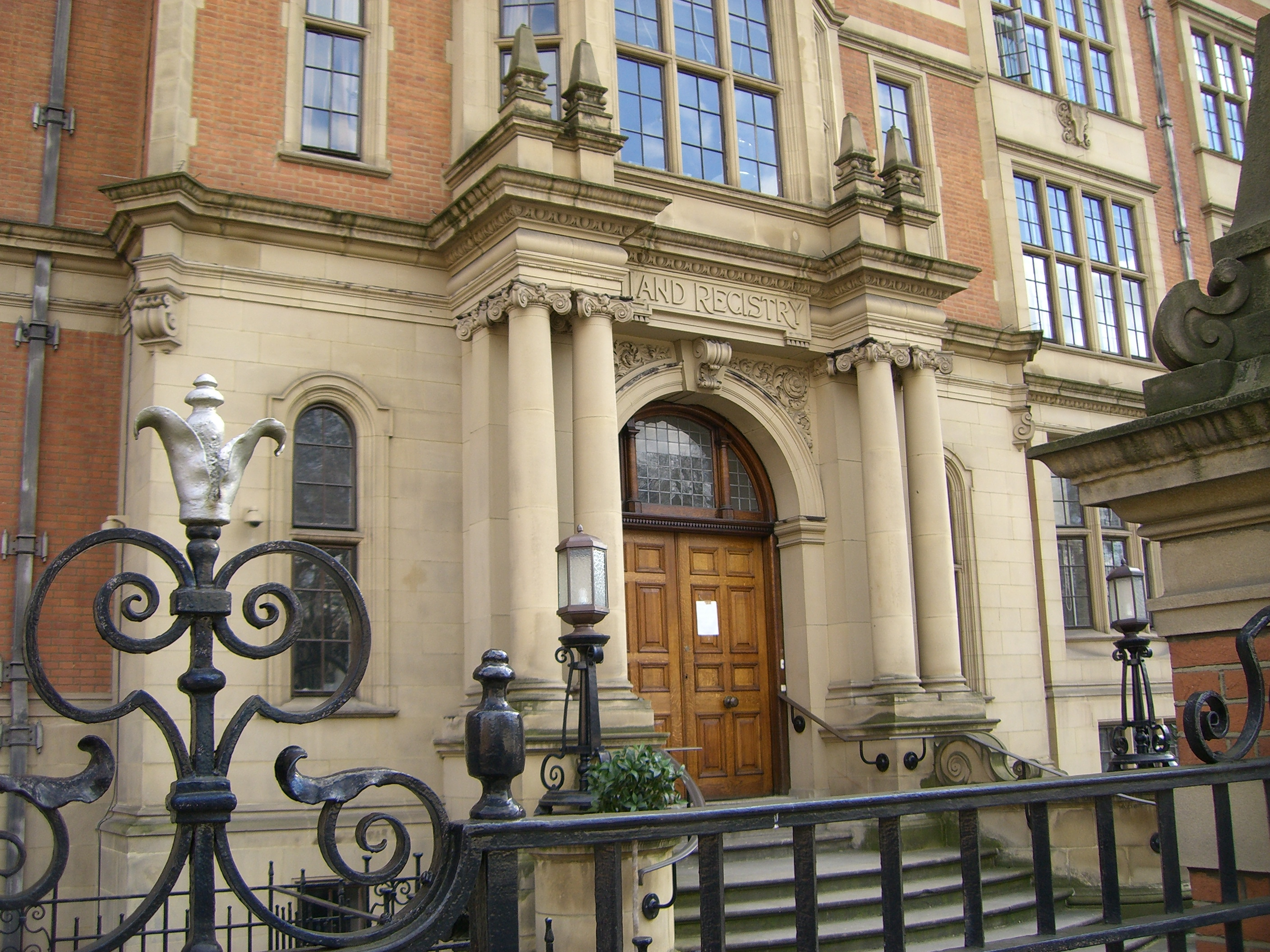
The old headquarters of HM Land Registry, 32 Lincoln's Inn Fields from 1913 to 2011, now the LSE's Department of Economics.

Registered land in English law accounts for around 88 per cent of the total land mass. Since 1925, English land law has required that proprietary interests in land be registered, except in cases where it is necessary to protect social or family interests that cannot reasonably be expected to be registered. English law also runs a parallel system for around 12 per cent of land that remains unregistered.

== History ==
Because land can serve multiple uses, for many people, and because its fixed nature means that its owner may not always be visible, a system of registration came to be seen as essential at the start of the 20th century. From the Land Registry Act 1862 which created a body where people could voluntarily register, a succession of government reports and piecemeal reform finally culminated in a unified, compulsory registration system with the Land Registration Act 1925. Its proponents argued that a registration system would increase land's marketability, and make its transfer as fluid as the registration system of company shares. Theodore Ruoff, Chief Registrar from 1963, said the main three functions the register served was (1) to mirror ownership interests in land (2) to curtain off minor, or equitable interests that could be bypassed (or "overreached") in the land conveyance business, and (3) to provide insurance through Registrar funds to anyone who lost property as a result of register defects. The ideal goal was thus to ensure that a comprehensive set of people whose interests had priority in a given real estate would be reflected on the register. With the Land Registration Act 2002, which recast the old law, the Registry has focused on "e-conveyancing". Under sections 91 to 95, electronic registration counts as deeds, and aims to replace the paper filing for the 21st century.

== Acquiring land by registration ==
Four main ways of acquiring land are through a gift, trust, succession and by contract, all of which involve express or at least presumed consent. In the case of an ordinary gift during a person's life, the Law of Property Act 1925 section 52(1) requires a deed (itself defined in the Law of Property (Miscellaneous Provisions) Act 1989 section 1) before any transfer is effective. Subsequently, a transfer must be registered. The Land Registration Act 2002 section 27(2) makes registration compulsory for all transfers of land, leases over seven years and any charges. Under LRA 2002 section 27, the consequence of a failure to register one's interest is that it will not bind another person in law who is transferred the property and does register. If the transfer of land takes place through a will, the Wills Act 1837 section 9 requires in similar terms that the will be signed in writing and have two witnesses. The beneficiary under the will must then take steps to register the interest in land in her name. In the case of a person who dies without leaving a will, their property, including land will succeed in passing by operation of law to the next of kin, or in the case of jointly owned property in a joint tenancy, to the co-owner/s.

In all situations, the requirement of formality is thought to improve the quality of people's consent. It has been reasoned, most notably by Lon Fuller, that going through the laborious motions of formality induces people to truly consider whether they wish to make a transfer. It also provides evidence of the transaction, and makes the threshold of a transaction's enforceability simple to determine. This is most seen in the case of a contract. If an interest in land is the subject of a contract, the law isolates three steps. First, the sale will take place, which according to LPMPA 1989 section 2 may only occur with signed writing (though by section 2(5) and the Law of Property Act 1925, section 54(2) leases under 3 years can be made without). Second, technically the transfer must take place under Law of Property Act 1925, section 52(1) by a deed (though there is no reason why this cannot be combined with step 1, by using a deed for the sale!). Third, the land must be registered for the legal interest to take effect under LRA 2002 sections 27 to 30.

== Overriding interests ==
HM Land Registry does not require interests acquired through informal methods to be recorded, which usually reflect social and family interests in property.

Reflecting the social use of land, the priority system of land registration and the Register's record of all interests in land has made significant exceptions for informal methods of acquiring rights, and especially equitable interests, in land. Under the Land Registration Act 2002 sections 27 to 30, an interest in land that is registered (for instance, freehold ownership, a long lease, or a mortgage) will take priority to all other interests that come later, or are not entered on the register. The first registered interest in time prevails. Yet under LRA 2002 Schedule 3, a series of exceptions, or "overriding interests" are listed. Under Schedule 3, paragraph 1, any lease that is less than seven years need not be registered, and will still bind other parties. The reason is to strike a balance between an owner who may well keep hold of land for a long period, and a person who may be renting as a home. Most socially significant, under Schedule 3, paragraph 2 (formerly Land Registration Act 1925 s 70(1)(g) the interest of a person who is in "actual occupation" need not be entered on the register, but will still bind later registered interests. This rule was said to be necessary to prevent the social right to a home being "lost in the welter of registration". It is most used in favour of people, typically a spouse in a family home whose name is not on the title deeds, who have not registered an interest because the law has recognised they have acquired a right - not through a formal, or express contract, or gift - but by their contributions, or their reliance on another person's assurances. If such a person is in "actual occupation", then their informally acquired interest (usually through "constructive trust", which recognises their contributions of money or work toward family life) will bind parties who acquire interests later on.

"Anyone who lends money on the security of a matrimonial home nowadays ought to realise that the wife may have a share in it. He ought to make sure that the wife agrees to it, or to go to the house and make inquiries of her. It seems to me utterly wrong that a lender should turn a blind eye to the wife's interest or the possibility of it - and afterwards seek to turn her and the family out - on the plea that he did not know she was in actual occupation. If a bank is to do its duty, in the society in which we live, it should recognise the integrity of the matrimonial home. It should not destroy it by disregarding the wife's interest in it - simply to ensure that it is paid the husband's debt in full - with the high interest rate now prevailing. We should not give monied might priority over social justice."

— Lord Denning MR in Williams & Glyn's Bank v Boland [1979] Ch 312

In a leading case, Williams & Glyn's Bank v Boland Mr Boland had had trouble repaying his bank for a loan he used on his building company. The loan was secured on his Beddington house, where he lived with Mrs Boland. However, Mrs Boland had not consented to the mortgage agreement. She was not registered on the home's title deeds, but she had made significant financial contributions to the home. Despite Templeman J at first instance saying Mrs Boland only occupied the house through her husband, the Court of Appeal, and the House of Lords both agreed that Mrs Boland actually did occupy her home, and that her interest bound the bank. Later cases have shown the test for actual occupation must be purposively, and liberally determined, according to the claimant's social circumstance. So in Chhokar v Chhokar a lady who had been beaten and attacked by her estranged husband's friends to scare her from her Southall home, and who was at the time of her home being registered in hospital having Mr Chhokar's child, was still in actual occupation. This meant that because she had contributed to the home's purchase price, she was entitled to stay. Her interest bound, and took priority to, later registered interests. Under LRA 2002 Schedule 3, paragraph 2, only if a person is asked about their interest, and they say nothing, or if it is not obvious on a reasonably careful inspection, would a person in actual occupation lose to a registered party.

== Implied consent to lose interests ==
It has also been held that someone who occupies a house and has an interest in the home might have impliedly consented to taking subject to another party's later interest. In both Bristol & West Building Society v Henning and Abbey National Building Society v Cann a couple purchased a home with the assistance of a loan from a building society, which was secured by mortgage on the property. In both cases the court held that because the buyers could not have got the house without the loan, there had been tacit consent by all to the bank taking priority, and no gap in time before registration when the spouse could have been said to be in prior actual occupancy.

== Overreaching ==
Originally to facilitate transfers of land, the Law of Property Act 1925 sections 2 and 27 make provision so that people with equitable interests in land may not assert them against purchasers of the land if there are two trustees. If a person has an equitable interest in a property, the law allows this interest to be detached from the property, or "overreached" and reattached to money given in exchange for land, so long as the exchange took place by at least two trustees. This was, however, applied not for the purpose of trading property by professional trustees, but against homeowners in City of London Building Society v Flegg. Here two parents, Mr and Mrs Flegg, had given their home to their children, who in turn mortgaged the property and defaulted on the loan. The House of Lords held that because the words of the statute were fulfilled, and the purchase money for the interest in the property (i.e. the loan that the children squandered) had been paid to two trustees, the Fleggs had to give up possession. Lastly, it is possible to lose an interest in land, even if registered, through adverse possession by another person after 12 years under the Limitation Act 1980 sections 15 to 17.

== See also ==
- English land law
