= Chhokar v Chhokar =

English land law case

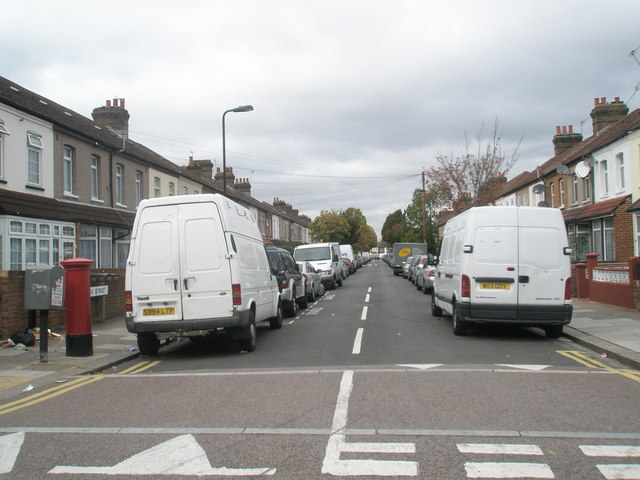
- A co-owner occupied house on this street was the subject matter.
- Court: Court of Appeal
- Full case name: Kuldip Kaur Chhokar v Harbhajan Singh Chhokar (and Tarsem Lal Parmar, responded, third party)
- Decided: 1 November 1983
- Citations: [1983] EWCA Civ 7 [1984] FLR 313

Case history
- Prior actions: The appellant failed before Eubank J in the High Court, Family Division

Court membership
- Judges sitting: Cumming Bruce LJ; Reeve J

Keywords
- Actual occupation; constructive trust

Chhokar v Chhokar [1984] FLR 313 is an English land law case concerning constructive trusts law and widening the natural meaning of "actual occupation" (which protects the occupier by virtue of the Land Registration Act 2002, Schedule 3, being an overriding interest). The facts of the case showed an intention to do a woman out of her (and her children's) occupational interest in a matrimonial home, as the new co-owner buying his share from the husband knew of her situation from the outset and wished to resell the property. The court confirmed in these exact circumstances her interest was overriding at the time when she was in hospital and it was a constructive trust.

== Facts ==
Mr. and Mrs. Chhokar married on 18 April 1975.

May 1977: Mr. Chhokar bought 60 Clarence Street, Southall, for the purchase price of £9250 with a deposit of £700. Mrs. Chhokar substantially contributed to the family fortunes to the tune of approximately £3000.

1978: There were matrimonial difficulties and they both travelled to India to visit their parents. Mr. Chhokar tries to abandon her in India but Mrs. Chhokar returns in November 1978, a few weeks later.

December 1978: An acquaintance of Mr. Chhokar, Mr. Parmar, visits the house under the guise of a potential lodger. They sign a contract of sale for the marital home for £12700 (an undervalue) and the date of completion was fixed at 12 February. This was the date on which Mrs. Chhokar was scheduled to deliver their second child in hospital.

However, Mrs. Chhokar did not deliver on 12 February. She delivered on the 16th and so the men deferred the completion of the sale until then. Mr. Parmar then put the house on the market for £18,000. When Mrs. Chhokar returned, she discovered the locks had been changed. She broke in but was forced out by Mr Parmar who threatened and assaulted her. Mrs. Chhokar managed to gain entry to the house again and stayed put.

The question for the court was whether Mrs. Chhokar could be said to be in 'actual occupation' even though she was not physically present in the house at the time of the transfer (sale).

== Judgment ==
=== High Court ===
Ewbank J ordered that Mr. Parmar held the property on trust for himself and Mrs. Chhokar in equal shares; that it be sold in 9 months; and until then, she must pay him a rent of £8 a week. She appealed, arguing she should stay rent-free until a sale.

=== Court of Appeal ===
The Court of Appeal, sitting as a panel of two judges, held the purpose of the trust was to give Mrs Chhokar and her children a home. There was no reason for an order for sale, having regard to the interest of third parties. Because Mr. Parmar stepped into Mr. Chhokar’s shoes, it would be inequitable for her to have to pay an occupational rent, but he should be entitled to credit for paying off the mortgage. Accordingly, she and Mr Parmar held the house as tenants in common in equity in equal shares. Cumming-Bruce LJ remarked that for the question about whether an order for sale should be made, bankruptcy case law was analogous and relevant. He first referred to Goff LJ in Re Holliday [1981] 1 Ch 405, before continuing his judgment.

I laid down the relevant principle where there is a bankruptcy in Re Turner (A Bankrupt) [1974] 1 WLR 1556 at p. 1558C: “In my judgment, the guiding principle in the exercise of the court’s discretion is not whether the trustee or the wife is being reasonable but, in all the circumstances of the case, whose voice in equity ought to prevail. . . .”

...and I would apply that test to this case. So we have to decide, having regard to all the circumstances, including the fact that there are young children and that the debtor was made bankrupt on his own petition, whose voice, that of the trustee seeking to realize the debtor’s share for the benefit of his creditors or that of the wife seeking to preserve a home for herself and the children, ought in equity to prevail. . . . Nevertheless, there is a discretion. . . .

The voice of the wife sings the following song: ‘I became tenant in common in equity with a 50% interest in this property, the matrimonial home, upon its acquisition. I have lived there ever since, subject to very brief periods of absence, and there I have been living with my family. I was deserted by my husband for some years but I stayed on in the matrimonial home. He has been very unsatisfactory. I had at one stage to obtain an injunction against him to stop him pestering me but we are now more reconciled. I have agreed to his returning to the home. From time to time he comes there. . . .’ and, on the judge’s finding, when the case was over he might settle with her again permanently. So her song is: ‘This is the matrimonial home, I wish to continue to enjoy my rights as tenant in common in the undivided share of the house.’ She told a lot of lies in the witness-box, which naturally offended the judge because her lies made it more difficult to discover the truth and do justice. It is not unknown for persons with strong grievances to try to embroider their case by telling lies. But when the true facts emerged, there is nothing in her conduct which points to any reason at all for interfering with her continued enjoyment of her equitable rights, including the right to occupy the house, the matrimonial home, and including, if this unsatisfactory husband is willing to continue to live with her there, although he has lost the legal estate, and if she is prepared to put up with him being there, her enjoyment of the matrimonial home together with her husband.

‘Everything that [Mr Parmar] did from first to last in connection with the transaction is stamped with immoral stigma.’

He held the judge at first instance was wrong to make an order for sale.

Reeve J concurred.

== See also ==
- English land law
- English property law

Similar cases

- Bannister v Bannister
- Binions v Evans
