= Sabharwal =

Sabharwal, also spelt Sabherwal, is a surname originating among the Hindu and Sikh Khatris of the Punjab region in northern India.

Notable people who bear the name, but are not necessarily associated with the Khatri clan, include:

== Academics ==
- Ashutosh Sabharwal, American professor of electrical engineering
- Malvika Sabharwal, Indian doctor
- Meghna Sabharwal, American professor of public policy

== Administrators ==
- Dharam Pal Sabharwal, Member of the Parliament of India representing Punjab in the Rajya Sabha
- Sharat Sabharwal, Indian civil servant who was the Indian High Commissioner to Pakistan
- Smita Sabharwal (born 1977), IAS Officer, the first female IAS Officer to be appointed to the Chief Minister's Office
- Sunil Sabharwal (born 1964), Indian businessman, alternate Executive Director of the International Monetary Fund

== Athletes ==
- Rohit Sabharwal (born 1978), Indian cricketer

== Creatives ==
- Manoj Sabharwal (born 1985), Indian scriptwriter
- Rohan Sabharwal (born 1979), Indian filmmaker
- Tara Sabharwal (born 1957), India-born USA-based painter and printmaker

== Actors and directors ==
- Anchal Sabharwal, Indian actress and model
- Dharmesh Darshan (born 1967), born Dharmesh Sabharwal, Indian director and producer
- Divjot Sabarwal, Indian actress
- Lata Sabharwal, Indian actress
- Suneel Darshan, born Suneel Sabharwal, Indian filmmaker and director

== Jurists ==
- Yogesh Kumar Sabharwal (1942–2015), 36th Chief Justice of India

== Activists ==
- Madan Mohan Sabharwal (1922–2018), Indian social worker and Businessman

== Pilots ==
- Captain Sumeet Sabharwal, an Air India pilot, who was the pilot flying Air India Flight 171 when it crashed on 12 June 2025

== See also ==
- Birmingham Midshires Mortgage Services Ltd v Sabherwal, English property law case
