= Bristol & West Building Society v Henning =

- Court: Court of Appeal
- Citations: [1985] EWCA Civ 6, [1985] 1 WLR 778

Keywords
- Consenting out, common intention constructive trust

Bristol & West Building Society v Henning [1985] EWCA Civ 6 is an English land law case that holds a person can consent to give up the right to an overriding interest in land, that will bind third parties, such as banks, that purchase a property. Although dealing with unregistered land, it is equally applicable in the case of registered land and now falls under the Land Registration Act 2002.

== Facts ==
Mr Henning lived with a lady from 1974 to 1981 but was not married. They had two children. They got a house in London in 1975 with a mortgage and it was all in his name. She made contributions and did work. In 1978 they agreed to buy a villa and large Devonshire garden, where she would begin a self-sufficiency project. This was bought in his name alone for £12,900, with an £11k mortgage from the building society. His application described her as his wife and said it was for their family. She worked on the property, did buildings and decorated and earned small sums for the family budget. He left in February 1981, and in December 1981 he started possession proceedings. It ended with a consent order where he said at all times he intended her to have a one half share of the house. He stopped to pay the mortgage after, and the building society proceeded for a possession order. He did not resist the claim. The building society accepted that she had an irrevocable licence to stay in the villa.

The Judge refused the possession order saying an irrevocable licence gave her some property interest. The building society appealed.

== Judgment ==
Browne-Wilkinson LJ held that the building society was entitled to take possession because the lady could show no beneficial interest under a constructive trust that had priority over the building society's interest. Mr Henning never had the intention of giving her a beneficial interest, and without an express or imputed intention, it was impossible to create a common intention constructive trust.

There is a risk that the common sense answer in this case may get lost in the many different technicalities which can arise. The basic fact is that the mortgage was granted to the Society with the full knowledge and approval of Mrs. Henning. There was a joint project between her and Mr. Henning to buy "The Villa" with the assistance of such mortgage. Without it, "The Villa" could never have been bought. Yet Mrs. Henning is alleging that she has the right to stay in "The Villa" in priority to the rights of the Society which provided the bulk of the purchase money for it. Although she has unsuccessfully tried to find some way of paying the instalments under the mortgage, the logical result of her argument (if right) is that she is entitled to stay in possession indefinitely without making any payment. That would be a strange result which I would be reluctant to reach.

Mr. Lindsay (who did not appear below) has in my judgment provided a short but complete solution to the technical problems . raised by the case. I will assume (without deciding) that Mrs. Henning was entitled either to a beneficial interest in "The Villa" or to some lesser property right of the kind exemplified in Re Sharpe. (supra). Since Mr. and Mrs. Henning did not declare any trust of "The Villa" in writing or reach any express agreement between themselves as to the beneficial interests, the only way in which Mrs. Henning can establish either right in "The Villa" would be to show, inter alia, that as between her and Mr. Henning there was an express or imputed intention or assumption that she should have such a right. The decision of the House of Lords in Gissing v Gissing [1971] A.C. 886 establishes that, in the absence of express agreement or express trust, a right to a beneficial interest under a constructive trust can only be established by proving an express or imputed intention that a party other than the legal owner should have a beneficial interest in the property, which intention renders it inequitable for the legal owner to claim the sole beneficial interest: see especially per Lord Diplock at pages 905-6. Similarly, in the absence of express agreement, such an intention or assumption must be proved in order to found the lesser property right of an irrevocable licence conferring a property interest: see Re Sharpe. Therefore, in order to determine what, on the assumption made, is the nature of Mrs. Henning's right in "The Villa", it is necessary first to determine from the parties' actions what were their express or imputed intentions as to her beneficial interest.

Once that is identified as the relevant question, in my judgment the answer becomes obvious. Mr. and Mrs. Henning did not contemporaneously express any intention as to the beneficial interests in the property. Therefore such intention if it exists has to be imputed to them from their actions. Mrs. Henning knew of and supported the proposal to raise the purchase price of "The Villa" on mortgage. In those circumstances, it is in my judgment impossible to impute to them any common intention other than that she authorised Mr. Henning to raise the money by mortgage to the Society. In more technical terms, it was the common intention that Mr. Henning as trustee should have power to grant the mortgage to the Society. Such power to mortgage must have extended to granting to the Society a mortgage having priority to any beneficial interests in the property. I would not impute to the parties an intention to mislead the Society by purporting to offer the unencumbered fee simple of the property as security when in fact there was to be an equitable interest which would take priority to the Society. Indeed in evidence Mrs. Henning said:

"I would have realised that the Building Society were expecting to be able to rely on the full value of the house as security of loan - but I never really thought about it - if somebody had explained it to me as you have now I would have appreciated it." This evidence shows that, although she had no actual relevant intention at the time, it would be wrong to impute to the parties any intention other than that the Society was to have a charge in priority to the parties' beneficial interests.

Mr. Whitaker, for Mrs. Henning, sought to avoid this conclusion by pointing out that such an intention left Mrs. Henning at the mercy of Mr. Henning and failed to provide the security which the house was designed to give her and her children. He points out that Mr. Henning could at any time cease to pay the mortgage instalments and the Society would then be able to take possession from Mrs. Henning. That is true. But the fact that the arrangements made did not, because of the rights of a third party, provide full security cannot alter the only intention it is possible to impute to the parties. There was no way in which "The Villa" could have been bought at all without the assistance of the mortgage to the Society and the mortgage to the Society could not be properly granted without giving the Society a charge over the whole legal and equitable interest.

Since the nature of Mrs. Henning's interest has to be found in the imputed intention of the parties and the imputed intention of the parties must have been that her interest was to be subject to that of the Society, it is impossible for Mrs. Henning to establish that she is entitled to some form of equitable interest which gives her rights in priority to the rights of the Society. I would therefore hold that, even on the assumption that Mrs. Henning has some equitable interest or right in "The Villa", such interest or right is subject to the Society's charge and provides no defence to the Society's claim for possession.

Mr. Whitaker submitted that the point on which I would decide the case is a new point not argued below. He submitted that this court accordingly had no jurisdiction to decide the case on that point. He accepts that no further evidence could have been adduced had the point been taken below. It is true that the precise point was not put below. But in my judgment it is simply a different formulation of the point that was argued below, namely that Mrs. Henning's rights, whatever they were, were not binding on the Society. In my judgment the point is open in this court.

Therefore, although I have considerable sympathy for Mrs. Henning, in my judgment the only correct answer in law is that her rights are subject to the rights of the Society and the appeal must be allowed. I should emphasise that I have decided the case on various assumptions. Nothing in this judgment should be taken as expressing any view on the questions whether Mrs. Henning in fact had an irrevocable licence in "The Villa", whether the decision in Re Sharpe was correct or whether Mrs. Henning's licence (if any) conferred any property, as opposed to contractual, right.

Sir John Donaldson MR and Lloyd LJ concurred.

== See also ==
- English land law
