= Amalgamation (land) =

English and Welsh legal concept

Amalgamation in English and Welsh land law is a simple process carried out in registered land. It combines neighbouring parcels (holdings) of land which are freehold.

In leasehold land interests (which can be at any storey) respective surrenders and a new combined lease followed by its registration instead is the process used: combination of leases — this can also be called the surrender and regrant involving more than one surrender.

== Statute and regulations ==
A small fee is payable to HM Land Registry rule 3 of the Land Registration Rules 2003 for amalgamation or subdivision.

== Effects ==
A single title with a larger plot shown in its associated title plan results. It avoids:

- Duplication of data.
- The risk of a part of the land being forgotten in a mortgage or sale.
- Inappropriate boundary features (fences/railings) being inadvertently kept/installed on the ground between two parcels in common ownership.

It enables:

- New geometric subdivision of the land (sometimes called severance), in deed termed transfers of part, which may be planned using a pre-approved Estate Plan submitted to the Land Registry
- Owners of subsidiary interests (e.g. mortgage lenders) to hold a marginally more solid security (with the benefit of certainty as to the totality of the estate), of particular use in auction sales which tend to miss additional parcels.
- In re-attachment corrections or alterations of title a closer match to the original title in which the land originally belonged.

It results in a slightly lengthier title register than a single one of the contributor titles where, just as on first registration of land which once had different ownership and has been affected by differing neighbours or developers imposing covenants on it, the titles vary in their easements and covenants.

== See also ==
- Severance (also known as transfers of part, subdivision)
- Registered land – compulsory registration
