= Birmingham Midshires Mortgage Services Ltd v Sabherwal =

English property law case

Birmingham Midshires v Sabherwal
- Court: Court of Appeal
- Decided: 17 December 1999
- Citations: [2000] 80 P&CR 256

Case history
- Prior action: Mr Recorder Isaacs QC in the Central London County Court found for the mortgage company

Court membership
- Judges sitting: Walker LJ and Alliott J

Birmingham Midshires Mortgage Services Limited v Sabherwal [2000] 80 P&CR 256 is an English property law case, concerning the principles of equitable interests, overriding interests, and overreaching interests. It is one of many cases where the commercial rights which mortgage lenders need to do business clash with the rights of innocent parties facing the loss of their home.

== Facts ==
Mrs Sabherwal was facing eviction from her home, bought in the names of her two sons in 1987 with family assets and a mortgage. It was occupied by Mrs Sabherwal, her sons, and their wives. In 1990 the sons took out a loan, secured on the house, with the mortgage company; this loan replaced an existing mortgage but was primarily taken in order to finance family business interests. In 1993 the sons defaulted on the repayments. Possession proceedings soon began. Mrs Sabherwal claimed to have overriding interests; the mortgage company claimed to have overreached them. The mortgage company won the original case.

The three key issues were

- Did Mrs Sabherwal have an equitable interest?
- Was this an overriding interest?
- Did the mortgage company successfully overreach this interest?

== Judgment ==
Mrs Sabherwal was found to have an equitable interest in the property. Lord Justice Walker went to some length in his judgment to detail the family financial history, which showed that Mrs Sabherwal had contributed to the purchase price of the house (although the question of by how much was not considered). The court also accepted that she was in actual occupation.

These being the case, the court appears to conclude that Mrs Sabherwal had an overriding interest.

Counsel for Mrs Sabherwal attacked the claim that the interest was overreached by arguing that the Trusts of Land and Appointment of Trustees Act 1996 altered the common law precedent, and by arguing that his client’s human rights (specifically the right to respect for one’s home in Article 8 of the European Convention on Human Rights) had been breached. Walker LJ found that neither the 1996 Act or the implementing 1998 Human Rights Act were in force at the material time, and furthermore even if they were neither would apply.

Despite searching at length for a reason why he should not, Walker LJ ultimately concluded that the precedent in City of London Building Society v Flegg should apply and Mrs Sabherwal’s interest was perfectly capable of being overreached and as the respondent had loaned capital money to two individuals – the sons – they had succeeded in overreaching her interest.
