= Severance (land) =

Legal division of a land parcel or termination of a joint tenancy

This page is about property law. For the tv-show, go to Severance (TV series)

In property law, a severance refers to one of three distinct legal concepts involving the separation or termination of a legal interest in land.

== Definitions ==
=== Transfer of part ===
In its most common real estate sense, a severance is the act of dividing a piece of land from a larger tract, creating a new and separate lot or parcel with its own legal title.

=== Termination of joint tenancy ===
In jurisdictions that recognise co-ownership, severance refers to the ending of a joint tenancy by an act or event other than the death of a co-owner. A unilateral act by one joint tenant — such as conveying their interest to a third party — severs the joint tenancy and converts it into a tenancy in common, eliminating the right of survivorship.

=== Contractual severance ===
In a contract or employment agreement, severance refers to the removal of a party from an agreement, the permitted ending of the agreement (e.g. via a break clause), or the separation of a clause or provision from the rest of the contract. A severed clause may either:

- form the basis of a new standalone agreement
- be treated as superseded, or
- be varied to become non-binding as to future conduct (see voidable contract)

The precise meaning of severance in any contractual context should be made explicit in the definitions clause of the agreement. In employment negotiations, the term most commonly refers to severance pay and related departure terms.

== Transfer of part — jurisdictional rules ==
In many jurisdictions, land use laws require that severances occur in an orderly fashion through plans of subdivision when multiple lots are being created.

In a registered or standardised land title system, colouring and other conventions may apply to title plans.

=== England and Wales ===
To reduce complexity, some jurisdictions permit minor severances to proceed without a full plan of subdivision, provided other criteria are met. In England and Wales this is typically limited to cases that revert a prior amalgamation of land. In unregistered land (approximately 15% of total land in England and Wales), any transfer of part triggers compulsory registration of the new parcel under registered land in English law.

=== Canada ===
In Canada, approval of qualifying minor severances is commonly referred to as a "consent". Authority to grant consents is delegated to local planning bodies such as committees of adjustment or land division committees. Colloquially in Canada and the United States, the terms "severance" and "severed lot" are used to refer specifically to minor land divisions, as distinct from the more formal subdivision process.

=== United States ===
In the United States, severance of mineral rights from surface rights — known as a mineral severance — is a common transaction in states with significant oil, gas, or mining activity. Once severed, mineral rights can be owned, leased, and transferred independently of the surface parcel.

== See also ==
- Joint tenancy
- Tenancy in common
- Subdivision (land)
- Mineral rights
- Break clause
- Registered land in English law
