= Rohan Sabharwal =

Indian filmmaker (born 1979)

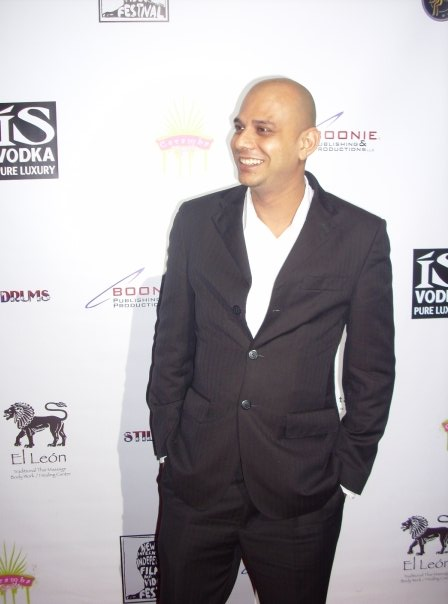
- Sabharwal at the Regency Fairfax Cinema, Hollywood attending the theatrical premiere of his film 'Shunyata' (August 2009).
- Born: Rohan Ajay Sabharwal; 10 October 1979 (age 45); Bombay, Maharashtra, India
- Occupation(s): film director, producer, screenwriter
- Years active: 2003–present

Rohan Sabharwal (born Rohan Ajay Sabharwal on 10 October 1979) is an Indian filmmaker.

== Family life and education ==
Sabharwal was born in the city of Mumbai. He is the elder of two sons born to a Punjabi father and a Catholic mother of mixed Goan-Portuguese and Anglo-Irish descent. He finished his schooling at the Lawrence School, Lovedale in 1996. He is a graduate of the London Film School, London, UK under the guidance of Oscar-nominated Mike Leigh O.B.E.

== Film career ==
After graduating from film school in 2006, the same year that he edited the award winning commercial 'Sarah and Wendy' which won the Kodak Student Commercial Award in the UK, he left London to pursue a career in film and television in India. Here he shot his 16-minute graduation film Shunyata, which premiered at the ICA cinema in London and generated mixed reviews, though most were favorable.

He became widely recognized as a filmmaker after the Celebrate Bandra Committee picked his 25-minute short Romson and Juliana to show at their biennial festival Celebrate Bandra in 2007.

His most recent film is the first episode of a television documentary series called India Rediscovered, inspired by Jawaharlal Nehru's book The Discovery of India. The series proposes to cover places of historic importance in India that have been ignored by text books.

== Filmography ==
Director/Producer
Year	Film	Other notes
2010	There are no Americans in Taxis	Currently in Pre Production
2009	Sons of the Soil	Post Production, A feature documentary that talks about Farmers' suicides in India
2009	Fearless	Post Production, A political documentary Featuring Mallika Sarabhai
2009	Happy Birthday Loki	Distributed by Journeyman Pictures
2009	An Epilogue To A Friendship	Starring Indian radio personality Tarana Kapoor
2008	India Rediscovered	TV pilot, Screened at the "Cannes Film Festival", 2009
2007	Romson and Juliana	Premiered at the Celebrate Bandra festival, 2007
2006	Shunyata	US Premiere: Regency Fairfax Cinema, Hollywood UK Premiere: Institute of Contemporary Arts, London
2005	This Man's Journey	Produced by the London Film School, Nominated at the British Film Festival, LA in the Category of Best UK Short.

Writer
Year	Film	Other notes
2009	The Lost Bloodline And Other Related Stories	Feature film, Currently in Pre Production, Quarter Finalist for the Golden Brad Awards

Editor
Year	Film	Other notes
2009	The Pact	Starring British actor JC Mac
2006	Sarah and Wendy	Won the Kodak Student Commercial Award, 2006 in Best Brief category.

== Sources ==
- http://film.britishcouncil.org/shunyata
- http://www.dnaindia.com/lifestyle/report_film-your-life_1285980
- Article title^{[usurped]}
- http://www.cultureunplugged.com/play/703/Shunyata
- http://www.cultureunplugged.com/play/1146/India-Rediscovered/Vm0xMFlWWXhTbkpQVm1SU1lrVndVbFpyVWtKUFVUMDkr
- http://www.cnngo.com/mumbai/none/presents-698673
- http://gulfnews.com/news/world/india/reel-touch-to-reality-1.705487
