= Diplomatic and Consular Premises Act 1987 =

Act of the Parliament of the United Kingdom

Diplomatic and Consular Premises Act 1987 (Note: Section 9(1).)
- Act of Parliament
- Parliament of the United Kingdom
- Long title: An Act to make provision as to what land is diplomatic or consular premises; to give the Secretary of State power to vest certain land in himself; to impose on him a duty to sell land vested in him in the exercise of that power; to give certain provisions of the Vienna Convention on Diplomatic Relations and the Vienna Convention on Consular Relations the force of law in the United Kingdom by amending Schedule 1 to the Diplomatic Privileges Act 1964 and Schedule 1 to the Consular Relations Act 1968; to amend section 9(2) of the Criminal Law Act 1977; and for connected purposes.
- Citation: 1987 c. 46
- Territorial extent: United Kingdom (Note: Section 9(3).)

Dates
- Royal assent: 15 May 1987
- Commencement: various (Note: Section 9(2).)
Other legislation
Amends	Land Registration Act 1925; Diplomatic Privileges Act 1964; Consular Relations Act 1968; Criminal Law Act 1977
Amended by	Land Registration Act 1988; Land Registration Act 2002
Relates to	Diplomatic Privileges Act 1964; Consular Relations Act 1968

Status: Amended

Text of statute as originally enacted

Revised text of statute as amended

Text of the Diplomatic and Consular Premises Act 1987 as in force today (including any amendments) within the United Kingdom, from legislation.gov.uk.

The Diplomatic and Consular Premises Act 1987 (c. 46) is an act of the Parliament of the United Kingdom which allows the UK government to determine what land is considered to be diplomatic or consular premises.

The act was a result of a government review of the law related to the inviolability of diplomatic premises following the 1984 Libyan Embassy Siege.

The law has only been used once, for the Cambodian embassy in London, which had been occupied by squatters. The embassy had been used by the Government of Cambodia before it was overthrown by Pol Pot in 1975. While that government was recognised by Britain, no diplomatic mission was established before Cambodia was invaded by Vietnam in 1978, and the building came into the care of the British Foreign Office. The squatters moved in while the embassy was vacant in 1976, and in 1988 they would have gained title to the building following twelve years of continuous occupation. Hence an order was made, the Diplomatic and Consular Premises (Cambodia) Order 1988 (SI 1988/30), to de-recognise the diplomatic premises so that legal action could be taken to remove the squatters.

In 2012 the UK government said it was considering using the law after Julian Assange, the founder of WikiLeaks, sought refuge in the Ecuadorian embassy in London, to avoid being extradited to Sweden where he faced allegations of sexual assault.

== See also ==
- Vienna Convention on Diplomatic Relations
