= Williams & Glyn's Bank v Boland =

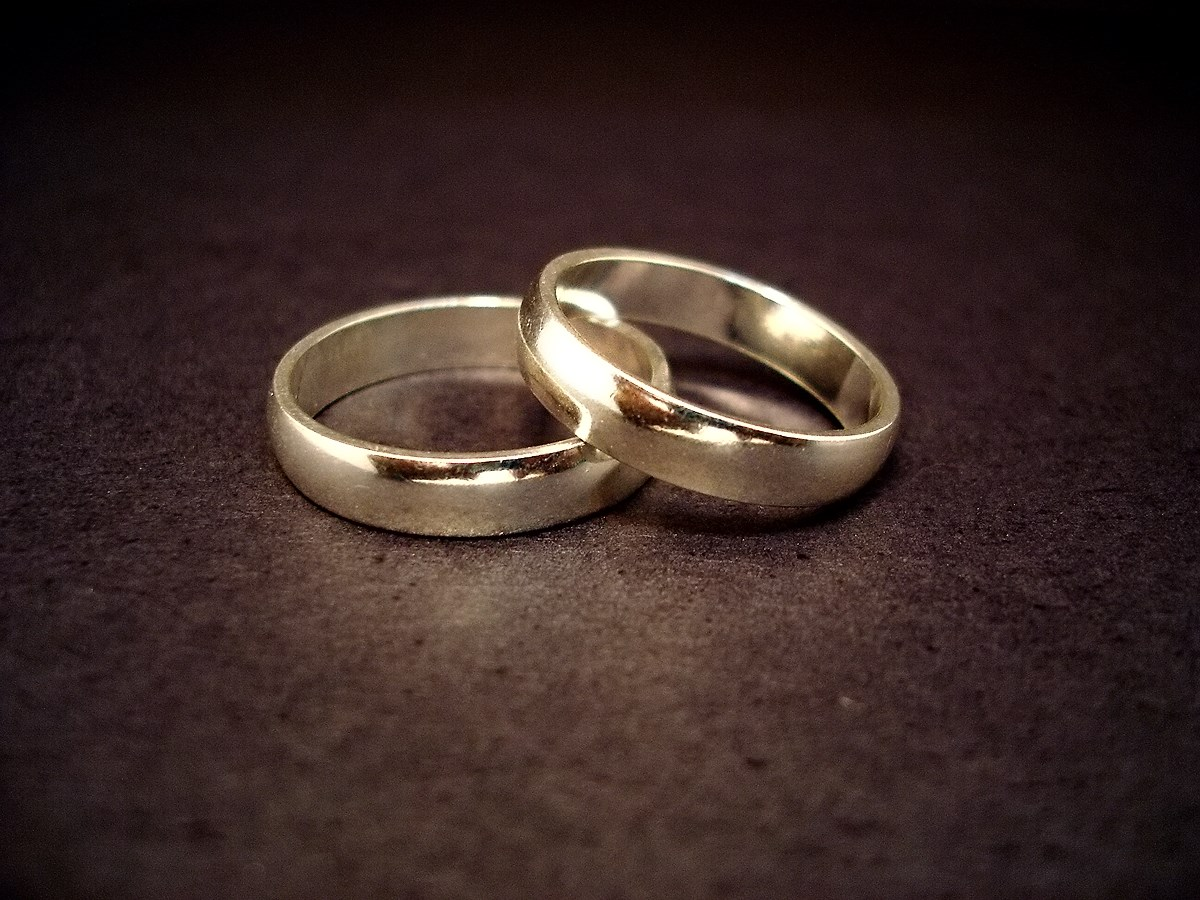
- Court: House of Lords
- Full case name: Williams & Glyn's Bank v Boland and Another and Williams & Glyn's Bank v Another
- Decided: 19 June 1980
- Citations: [1980] UKHL 4 [1981] AC 487 [1980] 2 All ER 408

Case history
- Prior actions: [1979] Ch 312; [1979] 2 WLR 550; [1979] 2 All ER 697, CA (The bank's appeal also failed in the Court of Appeal led by Ormrod LJ); Bank succeeded at first instance. Minor issue decided in favour of Bank at Court of Appeal; no s.36 Administration of Justice Act 1970 power to postpone sale hearing would have been appropriate given the high extent of debt.
- Subsequent action: none

Case opinions
- Held: Since the Bank made no enquiry of the wife in either case before granting the husband a mortgage, its claim as mortgagee to possession is, on this view of the subsection, defeated by the wife's overriding interest.
- Decision by: Lord Wilberforce; Lord Scarman; Lord Roskill
- Concurrence: Viscount Dilhorne; Lord Salmon

Keywords
- Overriding interest, registered land

Williams & Glyn's Bank v Boland [1980] is a House of Lords judgment in English land and trusts law (family co-ownership) on an occupier's potentially overriding interests in a home.

== Facts ==
Michael Boland and his wife Julia Sheila Boland lived on Ridge Park, Beddington, in the London Borough of Croydon. Mr Boland, registered owner of the house, borrowed money from Williams & Glyn's Bank for his building company. (Note: His company's name was Epsom Contractors Ltd) Boland failed to repay, and the bank sued for possession.

Mrs Boland argued that because she made substantial financial contributions to acquiring the home, she should be able to stay.

The bank argued:

1. Her rights did not qualify as a property right, basing its argument on the doctrine of conversion, and she should only get a share of any money made by her husband from the land, not a right enabling her to use it.
2. Even if there was a property right, the bank's defence was it registered its charge, and Mrs Boland's right was not registered.

The lack of registration defence/claim does not work if the party claiming the unregistered right is in actual occupation. Then, that person has an overriding interest. But the bank argued that if she cohabited with her husband, she should not count as being in actual occupation because a bank's (proper) investigation (as it then stood) would not alert it to her having a property right in the land. It would be no surprise to find a shared occupancy of a home.

== Judgment ==
=== High Court ===
Templeman J at first instance, said that Mrs Boland was not in ‘actual occupation’ within the Act's meaning, because her occupation was merely an accompaniment to her husband's. Therefore, her claim failed. Mrs Boland appealed.

=== Court of Appeal ===
The Court of Appeal held that Mrs Boland succeeded in her claim. She was in actual occupation under section 70(1)(g) of the Land Registration Act 1925 and that therefore she had an overriding interest in the property. The bank appealed contending that the wife's interest could only be considered a minor interest and that she could not be considered to be "in actual occupation". Lord Denning MR, giving the leading judgment, remarked that spouses had been ‘stripped bare’ by the House of Lord's in National Provincial Bank Ltd v Ainsworth. Then in Gissing v Gissing it was decided that contributions to the purchase price mean a trust arises. He went on to refute the view of Stamp J in Caunce v Caunce and Templeman J at first instance, that a wife could certainly be in ‘actual occupation’ even though her husband owned and occupied the property. The key parts of his judgment were as follows.

;Actual occupation

The wife clearly has rights. The only question is whether she is herself a person "in actual occupation of the land." In construing those words, "actual occupation", it is no use looking at the meaning of occupation in other branches of the law, such as "rateable occupation" or occupation for the purposes of occupier's liability. I would only say that occupation need not be in one single person. Two persons can be in actual occupation, by themselves jointly or each of them severally.

In Caunce v Caunce [1969] 1 W.L.R. 286 Stamp J. seems to have held that, when a wife was living in the matrimonial home with her husband, it was the husband alone who was in actual occupation of it. The wife was not. Stamp J. said at p. 293 that she: *332

"... was not in apparent occupation or possession. She was there, ostensibly, because she was the wife, and her presence there was wholly consistent with the title offered by the husband to the bank."

This was followed by Templeman J. in Bird v Syme-Thomson [1979] 1 W.L.R. 440, when he said, at p. 444A:

"In my judgment, when a mortgagor is in actual occupation of the matrimonial home, it cannot be said that his wife also is in actual occupation."

He followed it also in the present case when he said:

"actual occupation for the purposes of section 70 (1) (g) does not include the position of the wife of the legal owner who is in occupation."

Any other view, he said, would lead to chaos.

I profoundly disagree. Such statements would have been true a hundred years ago when the law regarded husband and wife as one: and the husband as that one. But they are not true today.

I do not think those statements can stand with the decision of this court in Hodgson v Marks [1971] Ch. 892: nor with the standing of women in our society today. Most wives now are joint owners of the matrimonial home - in law or in equity - with their husbands. They go out to work just as their husbands do. Their earnings go to build up the home just as much as their husband's earnings. Visit the home and you will find that she is in personal occupation of it just as much as he is. She eats there and sleeps there just as he does. She is in control of all that goes on there - just as much as he. In no respect whatever does the nature of her occupation differ from his. If he is a sailor away for months at a time, she is in actual occupation. If he deserts her, she is in actual occupation. These instances all show that "actual occupation" is matter of fact, not matter of law. It need not be single. Two partners in a business can be in actual occupation. It does not depend on title. A squatter is often in actual occupation. Taking it simply as matter of fact, I would conclude that in the cases before us the wife is in actual occupation just as the old lady Mrs. Hodgson was in Hodgson v Marks.

Once it is found that a wife is in actual occupation, then it is clear that in the case of registered land, a purchaser or lender would be well advised to make inquiry of the wife. If she then discloses her rights, he takes subject to them. If she does not disclose them, he takes free of them. I see no reason why this should cause any difficulty to conveyancers. Nor should it impair the proper conduct of businesses. Anyone who lends money on the security of a matrimonial home nowadays ought to realise that the wife may have a share in it. He ought to make sure that the wife agrees to it, or to go to the house and make inquiries of her. It seems to me utterly wrong that a lender should turn a blind eye to the wife's interest or the possibility of it - and afterwards seek to turn her and the family out - on the plea that he did not know she was in actual occupation. If a bank is to do its duty, in the society in which we live, it should recognise the integrity of the matrimonial home. It should not destroy it by disregarding the wife's interest in it - simply to ensure that it is paid the husband's debt in full - with the high interest rate now prevailing. We should not give monied might priority over social justice. We should protect the position of a wife who has a share - just as years ago we protected the deserted wife. In the hope that the House of Lords will not reverse us now as it did then.

=== House of Lords ===
The House of Lords upheld the Court of Appeal's decision and thus rejected the bank's application for possession. Mrs Boland's right(s) counted as a property right, and the bank had no defence. Lord Wilberforce held that the words ‘actual occupation’ under section 70(1)(g) of the Land Registration Act 1925 should be interpreted in plain English and did not require anything else but physical presence. The view that a husband's occupation (living there) precluded the wife's was wrong. Ditto a wife's occupation being "a shadow of her husband’s" similarly obsolete. And to say that actual occupation must be inconsistent with the husband's would be a ‘rewriting of the paragraph’. The rights of a spouse under a trust for sale are capable of recognition, if with difficulty, as overriding interests. He approved Lord Denning MR rejecting that the spouse's right was merely an interest in the proceeds of sale, rather than the house itself for living in it.

Lord Wilberforce said among his reasoning:

The solution must be derived from a consideration in the light of current social conditions of the Land Registration Act 1925 and other property statutes....

[...]

This brings me to the second question, which is whether such rights as a spouse has under a trust for sale are capable of recognition as overriding interests—a question to my mind of some difficulty. The argument against this is based upon the structure of the Land Registration Act 1925 and upon specific provisions in it.

As to structure, it is said that the Act recognises three things: (a) legal estates, (b) minor interests, which take effect in equity, (c) overriding interests. These are mutually exclusive: an equitable interest, which is a minor interest, is incapable of being at the same time an overriding interest. The wife's interest, existing under, or behind, a trust for sale is an equitable interest and nothing more. To give it the protection of an overriding interest would, moreover, contradict the principle according to which such an equitable interest can be overreached by an exercise of the trust for sale. As to the provisions of the Act, particular emphasis is placed on section 3(xv) which, in defining "minor interests" specifically includes in the case of land held on trust for sale "all interests and "powers which are under the Law of Property Act 1925, capable of being "overridden by the trustees for sale" and excludes, expressly, overriding interests. Reliance is also placed on section 86, which, dealing analogously, so it is said, with settled law, prescribes that successive or other interests created by or arising under a settlement take effect as minor interests and not otherwise, and on section 101 which, it is argued, recognises the exclusive character of minor interests, which in all cases can be overridden.

My Lords, I find this argument formidable. To reach a conclusion upon it involves some further consideration of the nature of trusts for sale, in relation to undivided shares....

How then are these various rights to be fitted into the scheme of the Land Registration Act 1925? It is clear, at least, that the interests of the co-owners under the "statutory trusts" are minor interests—this fits with the definition in section 3(xv). But I can see no reason why, if these interests, or that of any one of them, are or is protected by "actual occupation" they should remain merely as "minor interests". On the contrary, I see every reason why, in that event, they should acquire the status of overriding interests. And, moreover, I find it easy to accept that they satisfy the opening, and governing, words of section 70, namely, interests subsisting in reference to the land. As Lord Denning M.R. points out, to describe the interests of spouses in a house jointly bought to be lived in as a matrimonial home as merely an interest in proceeds of sale, or rents and profits until sale, is just a little unreal see also Elias v Mitchell [1972] Ch. 652 per Pennycuick VC with whose analysis I agree, and contrast, Cedar Holdings v Green [1979] 3 W.L.R.31 (which I consider to have been wrongly decided).

There are decisions, in relation to other equitable interests than those of tenants in common, which confirm this line of argument. In Bridges v Mees [1957] Ch. 475, Harman J. decided that a purchaser of land under a contract for sale, who had paid the price and so was entitled to the land in equity, could acquire an overriding interest by virtue of actual occupation, and a similar position was held by the Court of Appeal to arise in relation to a resulting trust (Hodgson v Marks [1971] Ch. 892). These decisions (following the law as it undoubtedly existed before 1925—see Barnhart v Greenshields I.c. p.32, Daniels v Davison (1809) 16 Yes. 249, Allen v Anthony (1816) 1 Mer. 282, 284 per Lord Eldon) provide an answer to the argument that there is a firm dividing line, or an unbridgeable gulf, between minor interests and overriding interests, and, on the contrary, confirm that the fact of occupation enables protection of the latter to extend to what without it would be the former. In my opinion, the wives' equitable interests, subsisting in reference to the land, were by the fact of occupation, made into overriding interests, and so protected by section 70(l)(g). I should add that it makes no difference to this that these same interests might also have been capable of protection by the registration of a caution (see Bridges v Mees p.c. p.487, Land Registration Act 1925, section 59(6)).

[...]

...whereas the object of a land registration system is to reduce the risks to purchasers from anything not on the register, to extend (if it be an extension) the area of risk so as to include possible interests of spouses, and indeed, in theory, of other members of the family or even outside it, may add to the burdens of purchasers, and involve them in enquiries which in some cases may be troublesome.... the extension of the risk area follows necessarily from the extension beyond the paterfamilias, of rights of ownership, itself following from the diffusion of property and earning capacity.

== Cases overruled ==
- Cedar Holdings Ltd v Green 1979 EWCA

== Cases disapproved ==
- Caunce v Caunce 1969 EWHC Ch D

== Cases applied ==
- Hodgson v Marks [1971] Ch 892; [1971] 2 WLR 1263; [1971] 2 All ER 684, EWCA
- Elias v Mitchell [1972] Ch 652; [1972] 2 WLR 740; [1972] 2 All ER 153, EWHC Ch D
- Bull v Bull [1955] 1 QB 234; [1955] 2 WLR 78; [1955] 1 All ER 253, EWCA

== Cases considered ==
- Irani Finance Ltd v Singh [1971] Ch 59; [1970] 3 WLR 330; [1970] 3 All ER 199, CA

== Distinguished in ==
- City of London Building Society v Flegg [1988] AC 54; HL (E&W)

== See also ==
- English land law
- English family law

== Notes and references ==
Notes
