= Overreaching =

Concept in English land law

Overreaching is a concept in English land law and the Law of Property Act 1925. It refers to a situation where a person's equitable property right is dissolved, detached from a piece of property, and reattached to money that is given by a third party for the property. This happens, according to City of London Building Society v Flegg in any case where property is bought or mortgaged in a contract with two or more title holders.

Overreaching can only exist where a trust is in existence and a property is sold. It occurs when the purchaser paid to at least two trustees in monies. The occupiers of a property in such a situation cannot then claim that their occupation of the property is an overriding interest, as the joint trustees have brought that occupation to a close through the sale of the property.

By purchasing the property from trustees, under Section 2 of the Law of Property Act 1925, the occupation rights of any other party are automatically extinguished. If such a party claims an overriding interest in the land, that interest is converted by attaching a monetary interest to the land, such as a purchase price, and the interest claimed by the party is 'overreached'; this conversion is often referred to as the doctrine of equitable conversion.

If only one owner exists, there is a risk that a third party could claim occupation and overreaching cannot apply.

The issues of overreaching and overriding interests are often closely linked, and the case of Birmingham Midshires v Sabherwal examined both issues.

Overreaching is a process whereby certain equitable rights in land which might otherwise have enjoyed protection in the system of registration on the occasion of a sale of that land to a purchaser for value are "swept off" the land and transferred to the purchase money that has just been paid.

== See also ==
- Overriding interest
