= Bandstand Promenade =

- walkway
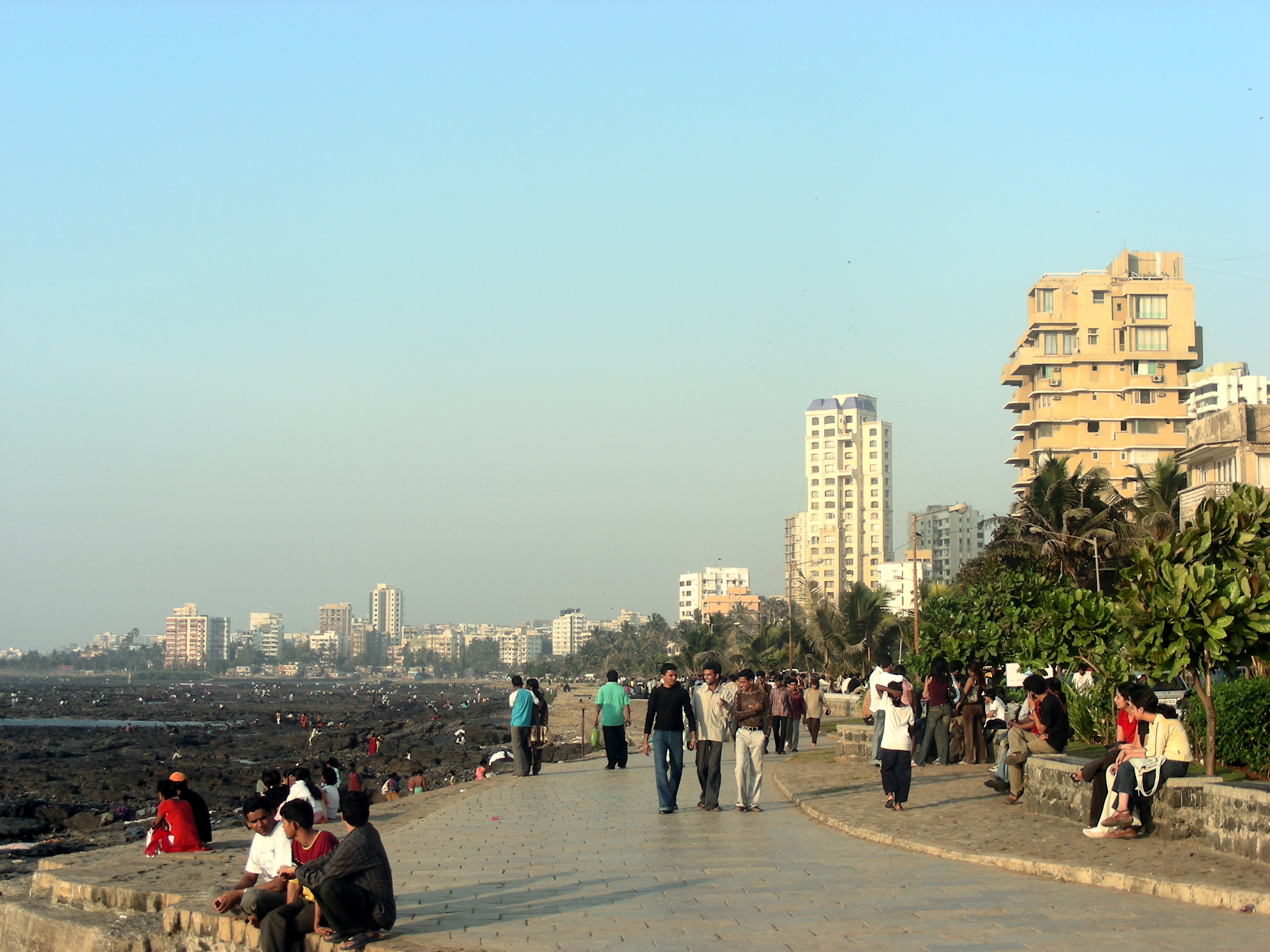

- Location in Mumbai, India
- Coordinates: 19.0427179°N 72.8191316°E
- Country: India
- State: Maharashtra
- District: Mumbai Suburban
- Metro: Mumbai

Government
  - Type: Municipal Corporation
  - Body: Brihanmumbai Municipal Corporation (MCGM)

Languages
  - Official: Marathi
- Time zone: UTC+5:30 (IST)

The Bandstand Promenade, also known as Bandra Bandstand, is a 1.2 kilometer long walkway along the sea on the western coast of Mumbai, India in the neighborhood of Bandra. It is simultaneously a popular hangout spot, a jogging track and a park.

Towards the Land's End side of the promenade is an amphitheater. It serves as a venue for the Mumbai Festival, Celebrate Bandra and other events including concerts, classical dance and other performances. The 'Artist's Court' is another performance venue built into the promenade that witnesses public Jam sessions on Sundays.

== Other attractions ==
=== Bandra fort ===
Bandra Fort is located right at the end of the road, adjacent to Hotel Taj Land's End. It was built by the Portuguese in 1640 as a watchtower overlooking Mahim Bay, the Arabian Sea, and the southern island of Mahim. Castella de Aguada has been featured in several Hindi films, such as Dil Chahta Hai, Buddha Mil Gaya and Jaane Tu... Ya Jaane Na.

=== Bandra Sea Link ===
The Bandra–Worli Sea Link (BWSL), officially the Rajiv Gandhi Sea Link, is a cable-stayed bridge with pre-stressed concrete viaduct approaches, which links Bandra in West Mumbai with Worli and Nariman Point, and is the first phase of the proposed West Island Freeway system. The Sea Link reduces travel time between Bandra and Worli from 45 to 60 minutes down to 7 minutes. The link has an average traffic of around 37,500 vehicles per day.

=== Mount Mary Church ===
The Basilica of Our Lady of the Mount, more commonly known as Mount Mary Church, is considered to be one of the oldest in the city of Mumbai. The church stands on a hillock, about 80 metres above sea level off Bandstand overlooking the Arabian Sea. It draws lakhs of devotees and pilgrims annually.

=== Walk of the Stars ===
The Walk of the Stars was a small section of the Bandstand Promenade honoring Bollywood film stars. The path featured about six statues of famous Bollywood actors as well as about 100 brass plates embossed with the handprints and signatures of other stars. The walk was inspired by the Hollywood Walk of Fame. It was funded and privately managed by UTV and promoted through their UTV Stars television channel. As of December 2014, the walk with the stars section of the promenade has been removed.

== Gallery ==
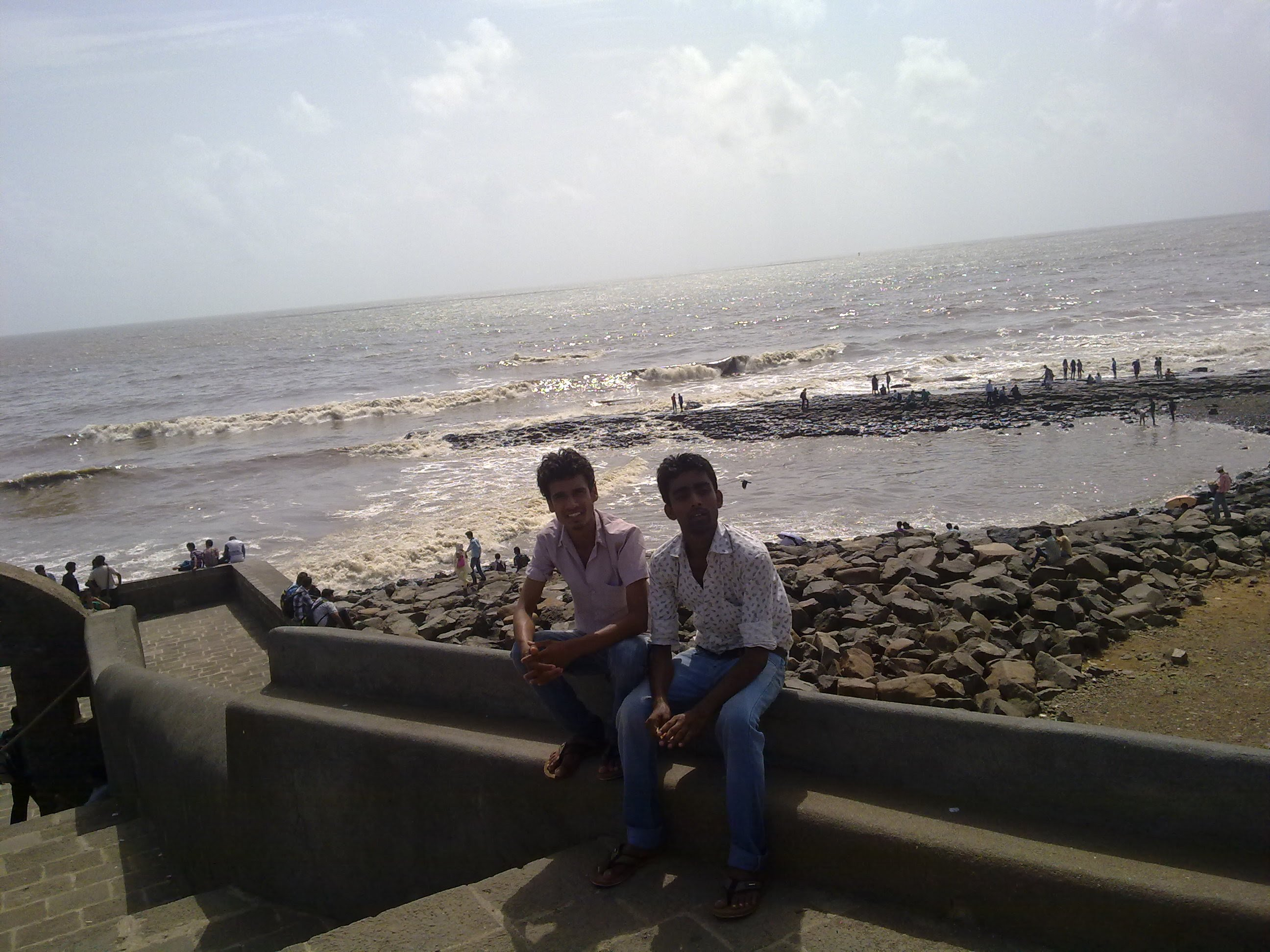
Two friends together at Bandra Bandstand in 2014

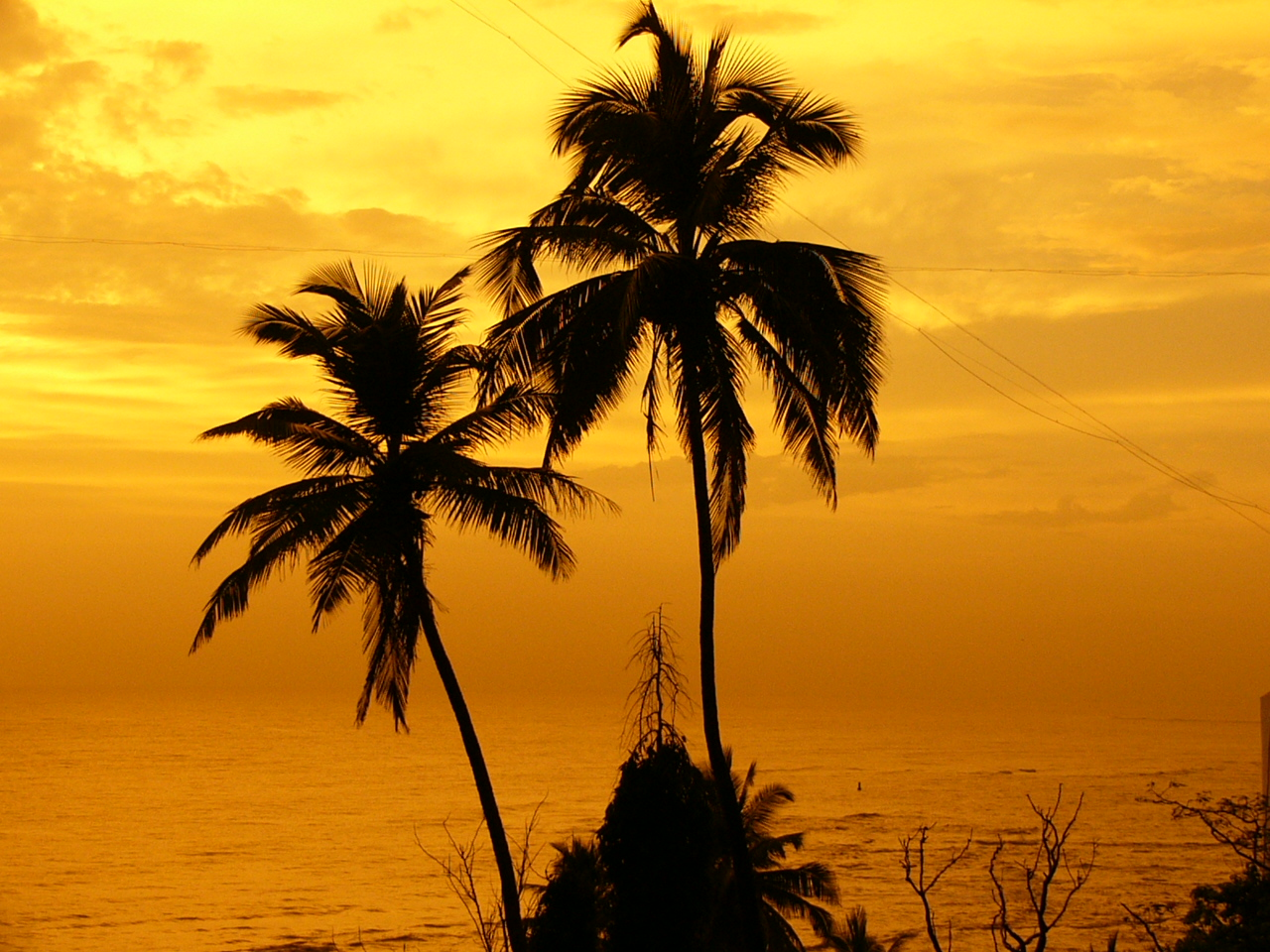
Sunset at bandstand

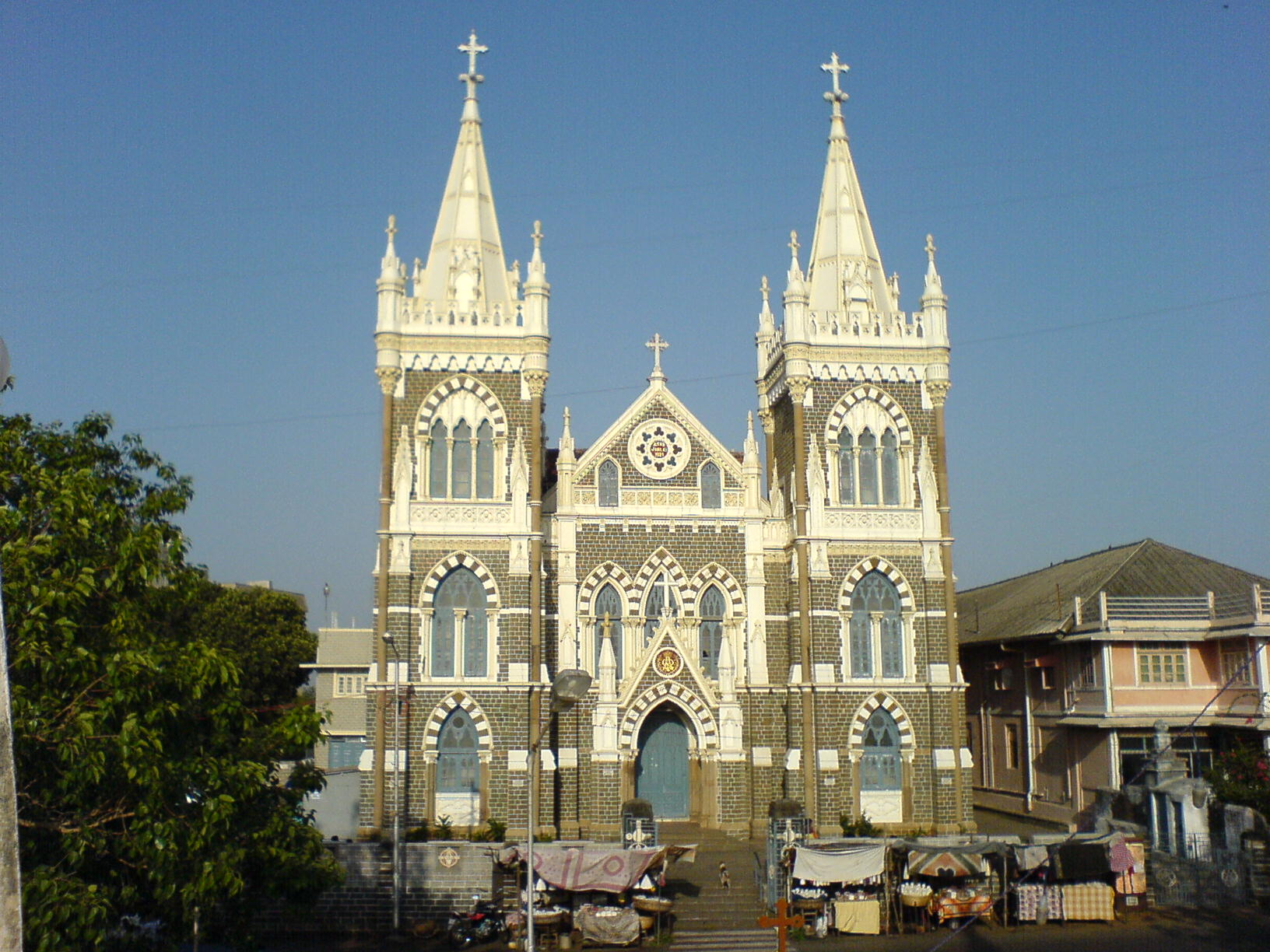
Mount Mary Church, Bandstand Promenade, Bandra

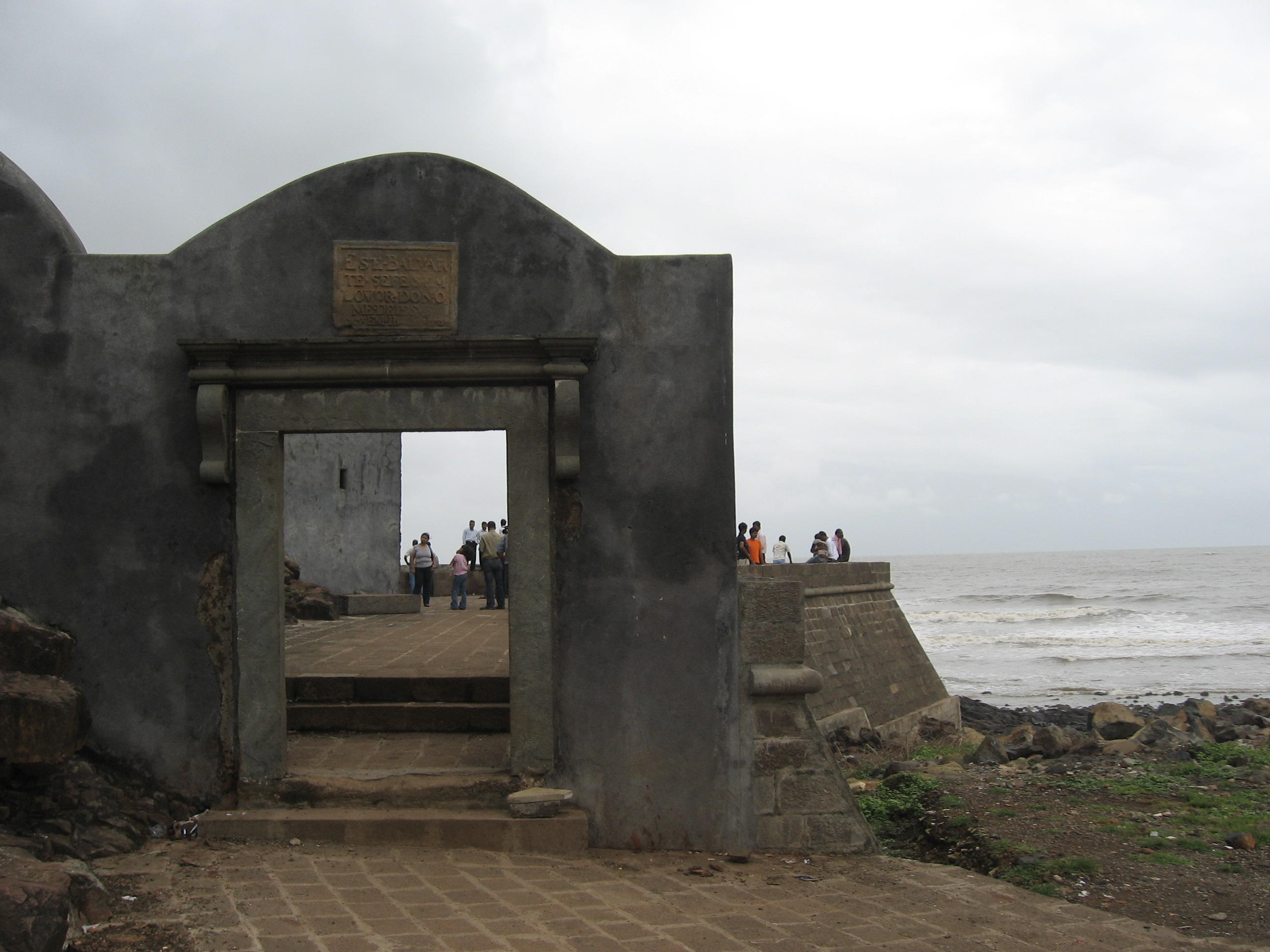
Castella de Aguada, also known as the Bandra Fort

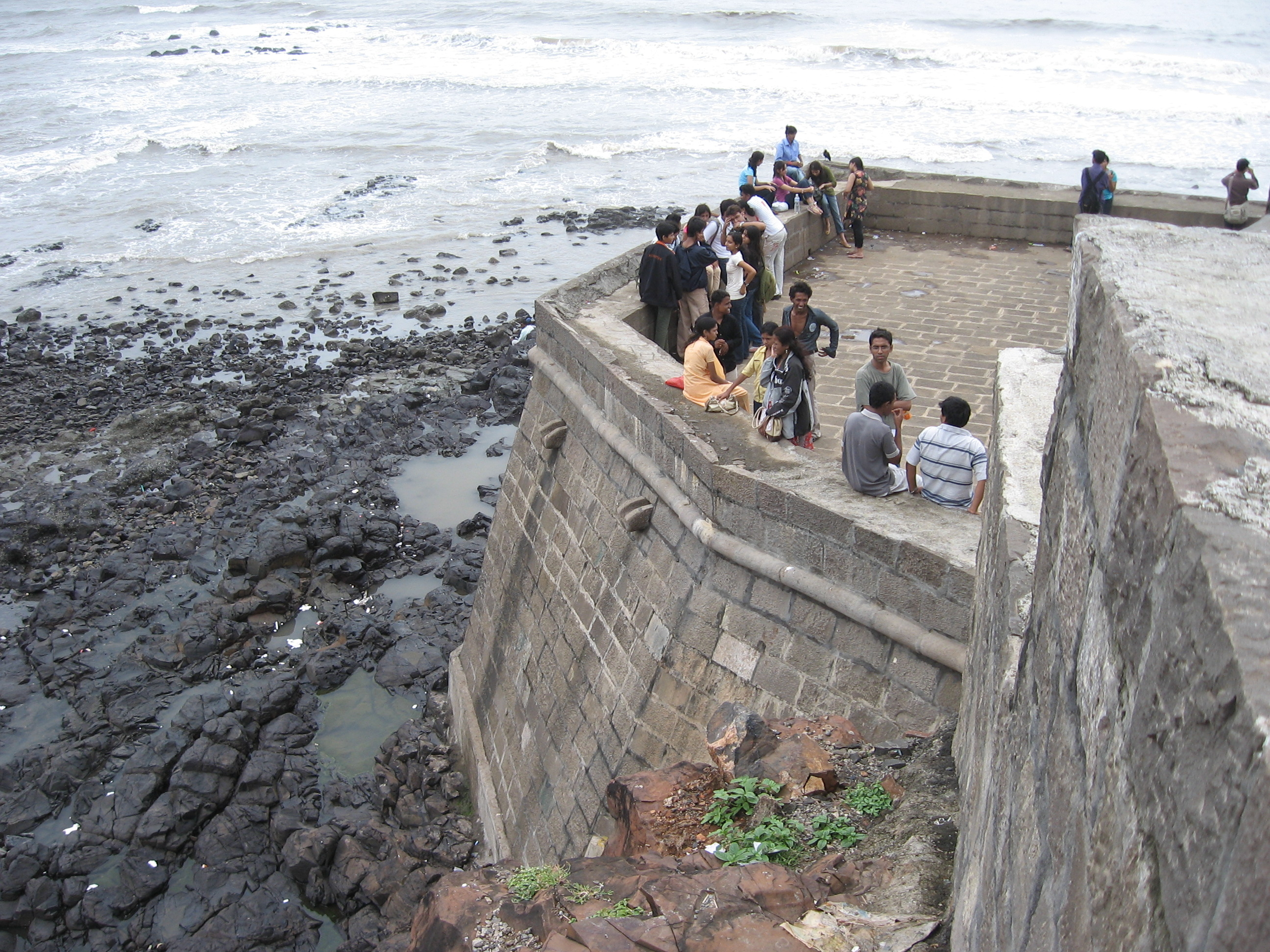
Castella de Aguada, a watchtower overlooking Mahim Bay, the Arabian Sea and the southern island of Mahim

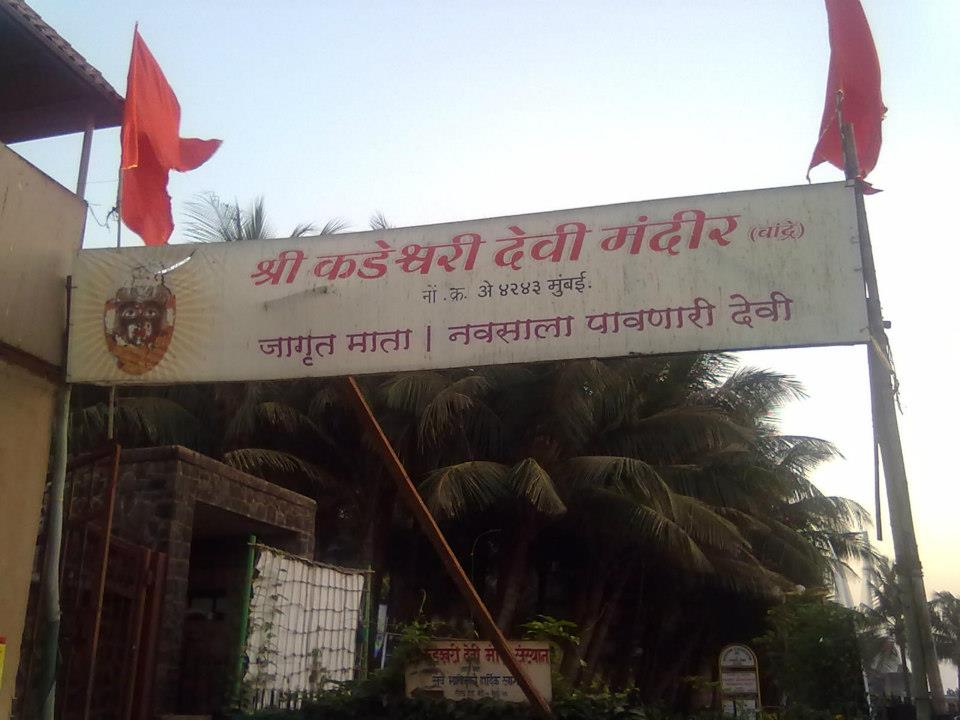
Kadeshwari Devi Temple Bandra
