= Binions v Evans =

English legal case

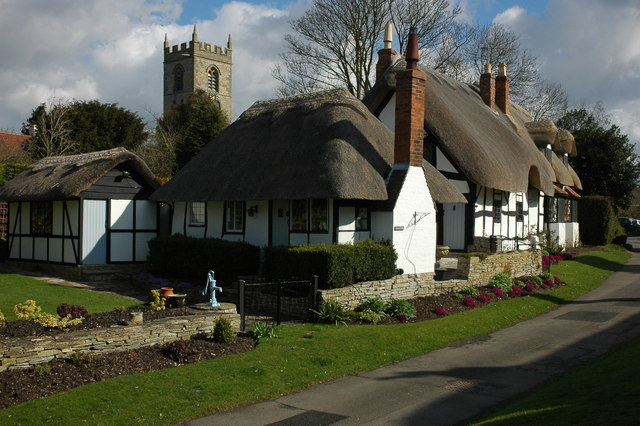
- Court: Court of Appeal
- Citations: [1972] EWCA Civ 6 [1972] Ch 359

Case history
- Prior action: Appellant lost at first instance in Newport County Court before HHJ Bulger. Case leapfrog-appealed to Court of Appeal.

Court membership
- Judges sitting: Denning LJ, the Master of the Rolls; Megaw LJ; Stephenson LJ

Keywords
- Constructive trust; tenant for life

Binions v Evans [1972] EWCA Civ 6 is an English land law and English trusts law case, concerning a constructive trust of land (a home) which will often be irrevocable whilst the occupier is in occupation as opposed to a licence to occupy — and/or a tenancy at will which is similar save that without transfer of the underlying property it can be revoked without cause. The case hinged on the fact there was an agreement specifying the existing occupier was to remain.

Bannister v Bannister (1948) 2 All ER 133 was followed and approved.

== Facts ==
Mr and Mrs Binions promised the sellers to allow Mrs Evans to remain in her cottage for life when they bought it. Mrs Evans's relationship pre-dated the Binions' interest in the property (the Tredegar Estate had allowed her and her husband before he died, a servant of theirs to occupy and had entered into its standard tenancy with her as the survivor). The Binions family argued she was a ‘tenant at will’.

== Judgment ==
Lord Denning MR held that Mrs Evans could assert her right to remain in the cottage against the Binions even though she had no legal or equitable property right as such.

Suppose, however, that the widow did not have an equitable interest at the outset, nevertheless it is quite plain that she obtained one afterwards when the Tredegar Estate sold the cottage. They stipulated with the purchaser that he was to take the house “subject to” the widow’s rights under the agreement. They supplied the purchaser with a copy of the contracts and the purchaser paid less because of her right to stay there. In these circumstances, this Court will impose on the purchaser a constructive trust for her benefit: for the simple reason that it would be utterly inequitable for the purchaser to turn the widow out contrary to the stipulation subject to which he took the premises. That seems to me clear from the important decision of Bannister v Bannister (1948) 2 AER 137, which was applied by the Judge, and which I gladly follow. This imposing of a constructive trust is entirely in accord with the precepts of equity. As Mr. Justice Cardozo once put it: “A constructive trust is the formula through which the conscience of equity finds expression”, see Beatty v Guggenheim & Co (1919) 225 N.Y. 380, 385: or, as Lord Diplock put it quite recently, a constructive trust is created “whenever the trustee has so conducted himself that it would be inequitable to allow him to deny to the cestui que trust a beneficial interest in the land acquired”, see Gissing v Gissing (1970) W.L.R. at page 267-F.

A contractual licence is itself an equitable interest in land.

Megaw LJ held that Mrs Evans had rather an equitable life interest, more than a contractual licence. He noted the possibility of a tort being commissioned if someone knowingly acquires a right with the intention of not allowing someone to exercise their contractual right. ‘However, it may be that there are special technical considerations in the law relating to land that would require to be reviewed before one could confidently assert that the ordinary principles as to the protection of known contractual rights would apply.’

Stephenson LJ agreed with the other judges, including the judge below and gave his own judgment:

But Bannister v Bannister is a clear decision of this Court that such words as have been used in this agreement (excepting, I must concede, the words "as tenant at will of them") create a life interest determinable (apart from the special considerations introduced by the Settled Land Act 1925) on the beneficiary ceasing to occupy the premises and the landlords hold the cottage to permit her to occupy it "during her life or as long as she lives", as the Judge held, and subject thereto in trust for them.

... The successors in title to the owners who put forward this agreement took the cottage subject to the agreement and ought to be in no better position to turn her out than their predecessors who agreed not to.

I am happy to find that the law is what it ought to be and to agree that this appeal cannot succeed.

== See also ==
- English trusts law
- English land law
- English property law
