= Celebrate Bandra =

Logo

Celebrate Bandra is the biennial cultural festival of Bandra, Mumbai that showcases the best the suburb has to offer in heritage, music, sport, theatre, literature & poetry, food, art and film. It is an initiative of the Celebrate Bandra Trust and Fountainhead Promotions & Events Pvt. Ltd. Darryl D'monte is the chairman and convener of the two-week-long festival. The 2011 edition of the action-packed festival saw over 100 events from 12 to 27 November 2011.

In 2015, the 7th edition of the festival was a 5-day long celebration ending on 22 November 2015. The festival again offered everything from music, theatre, film, dance, sport, food, heritage to art and poetry.

The festival contributes towards a better quality of life for Bandra residents. In the past, the festival has sponsored a rainwater harvesting project, a solar water heating project, school buses for an orphanage and a school for underprivileged children. It also donated a bus to the Kripa Foundation.

== History ==
It all began when several individuals and organizations realized how rich and textured Bandra life was, and how worthy it was of salutation. And that is why in November 2003, all of Bandra came together in a unique celebration of culture, colour, vibrancy and entertainment. Spearheaded by several Residents' Associations like the Bandra West Residents Association, Bandra Bandstand Residents Trust, Federation of H/W Ward Citizens Trust and Bandra Reclamation Area Volunteers Organization along with Fountainhead Promotions and Events Pvt. Ltd., Celebrate Bandra 2003 serves as a model example of the suburb's many talents and inherent cultural harmony. Since inception in 2003, each festival has been theme based, for example, in 2005 - Education, 2007 - Heritage, 2009 - Environment and 2011 - Diversity.

== Performing Arts ==
Music has always been one of the main attractions of the festival. 2011 saw performances by Shaan and Usha Uthup, in addition to Soulmate from Shillong, graffiti and Hip Hop artist Akim Walta from Berlin, Peter Cat Recording Co from New Delhi/ San Francisco, The Mavyns, Spud in the Box, Airport, 3 Guys & a girl, Sky Rabbit, The Ungulates and The Tripp. Theatre also took centre stage with Naseeruddin Shah’s theatre group, Motley, performing six plays. While the music and dance events were organised along Bandra Reclamation, Bandstand and Carter Road promenades, the theatre acts were presented in the Hindustan Lever Park on St Paul Road.

== Food Festival ==
Held on the Saturday of the closing weekend, the Food Festival is a huge food court with varied cuisines from all over India and the world. It usually commences in the evening and stretches into the night. Participants range from individuals to restaurants and fast food chains. Various food related competitions such as bake off's are also held for individuals. The Bandra Gymkhana has been the venue to the Food Festival both in 2003 and in 2005. In the 2011 edition, the Pune Gourmet Club hosting the Bandra Wine Festival as part of Celebrate Bandra.

== Competitions ==
Fine Arts: Arts & Craft, Battle of the Bands, Dancing etc.
Culinary : Bake-Offs, Cook-Offs etc.
Sports : Badminton (Singles/Doubles/Mixed Doubles), Tennis (Singles/Doubles/Mixed Doubles), Throw Ball (Ladies) etc.

== Sponsors ==
Vodafone, Smirnoff, Kotak Mahindra Bank and HDIL were the main sponsors of Celebrate Bandra 2011.

Supreme Universal was the title sponsor while FRB was the associate sponsor for Celebrate Bandra 2015.

Past sponsors include:
Orange
HDFC Bank
Eureka Forbes Radio Mirch, Go 92.5 FM, Pest Control of India (PCI), HSBC Bank. Castle Beer, Fosters Beer, United Phosphorus, 100 Pipers, Times of India, Maharashtra, Arth Housing, Blue Star, Vista Do Rio, Zima, Perfect Relations, R & PM Edelmen,

== Notes ==
Since most of the sponsorship was provided by Orange, it was known as Orange Celebrate Bandra in 2005. In 2006 Orange was renamed as Hutch.
