= Land Registry Act 1862 =

Act of the Parliament of the United Kingdom

Land Registry Act 1862 (Note: The citation of this act by this short title was authorised by section 1 of, and the first schedule to, the Short Titles Act 1896. Due to the repeal of those provisions it is now authorised by section 19(2) of the Interpretation Act 1978.)
- Act of Parliament
- Parliament of the United Kingdom
- Long title: An Act to facilitate Proof of Title to, and the Conveyance of, Real Estates.
- Citation: 25 & 26 Vict. c. 53
- Territorial extent: England and Wales (Note: Section 1.)

Dates
- Royal assent: 29 July 1862
- Commencement: 29 July 1862 (Note: The Acts of Parliament (Commencement) Act 1793.)
- Repealed: 13 October 2003 (Note: The Land Registration Act 2002 (Commencement No. 4) Order 2003 (SI 2003/1725).)
Other legislation
Amended by	Statute Law Revision Act 1875; Perjury Act 1911; Statute Law (Repeals) Act 1971; Statute Law (Repeals) Act 1974
Repealed by	Land Registration Act 2002

Status: Repealed

Text of statute as originally enacted

Revised text of statute as amended

The Land Registry Act 1862 (25 & 26 Vict. c. 53) was an act of the Parliament of the United Kingdom. It was the country's first attempt at a system of universal land registration, specifically a title register, applying to England and Wales. It replaced several local deed registries throughout England, which had been established in the early 1700s in order to protect against fraud conducted by undisclosed prior incumbrances on titles. The legislation simplified the transfer of land. At the time, land ownership was difficult and expensive, and usually only done by the very privileged. Registration under the 1862 act was also expensive, partially because it was necessary to map and survey the entirety of the property (this was fixed by later legislation). 2,000 properties were registered under the act.

Opponents of deed registration at the time claimed that a general registry was unnecessary. In practice, the conditions of sale at the time circumvented a number of the problems that motivated the legislation. A system of deeds registration was also considered at the time: title registration was a new and untried system. The prior deed registries had a number of problems, including those relating to notice, and the lack of standardised and reliable indexes to the considerably large documents. General registry bills had previously been narrowly lost in Parliament in 1740 and 1758.

This system quickly proved seriously flawed due to high costs and long delays. Following further attempts in 1875 (a failure) and 1897 (a near-failure), the present system was brought into force by the Land Registration Act 1925 (15 & 16 Geo. 5. c. 21), as amended by the Land Registration Act 2002.

== Registry ==
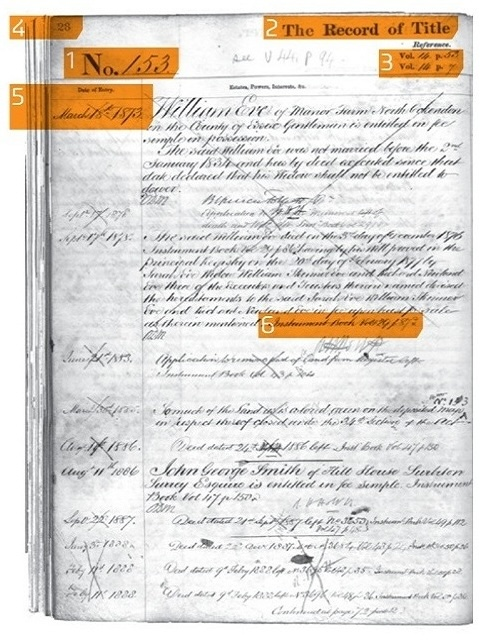
A guide to interpreting the land registry mandated by the 1862 Land Registry Act in the UK

The register was divided into three main parts: one with details on the properties and their locations, one with details on the owners and sales, and one with details on mortgages and leases. These were called "The Register of Estates of Indefeasible Title to Land", "The Record of Title to Lands on the Register", and "The Register of Mortgages and Incumbrances" respectively.

About 2,000 properties were registered under the act, and the final register comprised 272 volumes. "Instrument Books" were also kept, containing documents like deeds, plans, and marriage certificates to verify contents of the registry. The first registered title (Title Number 1) corresponded to the properties Crane Hall and The Chantry of Fitzroy Kelly, registered in 1863.

== Subsequent developments ==
Sections 108–113 of the act were repealed by section 1 of, and the part IX of the schedule to, the Statute Law (Repeals) Act 1971, which came into force on 27 July 1971.

Section 135 of the act was repealed by section 1 of, and part IV of the schedule to, the Statute Law (Repeals) Act 1974, which came into force on 27 June 1974.

The whole act was repealed by section 135 of, and schedule 13 to, the Land Registration Act 2002, which came into force on 13 October 2003.

== Notes ==
This article incorporates content from the following article: Land registration.
