= Hodgson v Marks =

1971 English land law case

- Court: Court of Appeal
- Citations: [1971] Civ 8, [1971] Ch 892

Case opinions
- Russell LJ

Keywords
- Actual occupation, resulting trust

Hodgson v Marks [1971] EWCA Civ 8 is an English land law case concerning the right of a person with an equitable interest in a home to remain in actual occupation, even if a bank has a charge and is seeking repossession.

== Facts ==
Mrs Hodgson bought 31 Gibbs Green, Edgware, Middlesex in 1939. After being widowed in April 1959 she took Mr Evans as a lodger, and in June 1960 transferred him her freehold for free. He told her she should give him the deeds so her nephew, in the foreign service, would not return and turn her out. He also took money to invest on her behalf. He registered himself, and sold it to Mr Marks, who gave a charge to Cheltenham & Gloucester Building Society. Mrs Hodgson, still living there, found out and claimed a declaration that Mr Marks should transfer his freehold to her, free from the building society charge. Mr Evans had held on trust for her, and that bound Mr Marks and the building society.

== Judgment ==
=== High Court ===
Ungoed-Thomas J held that Mrs Hodgson did not have the right to stay in her home. He found that Mrs Hodgson had always intended for Mr Evans to hold any title on trust for her, despite any signed writing (Law of Property Act 1925, section 53(1)(b) declaration of trust in land requires writing, but (2) does not affect resulting, implied or constructive trusts). She reposed trust and confidence in him. The key point was that the requirement of writing could not be used to let a fraud be perpetrated. But he held that Mrs Hodgson nevertheless lost because she was not in ‘actual occupation’.

... the question as argued became: Did the principle that the Statute of Frauds should not be used as an instrument of fraud dispense with the writing that would otherwise be essential under section 53 to establish the trust in Mrs Hodgson’s favour?

[...]

Whoever relies upon the statutory requirement of writing is himself using the statute as an instrument to avoid cognisance being taken of the trust… to the extent to which a person relies on the statutory defence to exclude the establishment of fraud, he uses the statute as an instrument of fraud - to succeed by using the statute to exclude evidence of fraud.

=== Court of Appeal ===
Russell LJ found in favour of Mrs Hodgson, but on the basis that there was a resulting trust, rather than that statute should not be used as an instrument of fraud. She had an equitable proprietary interest through a resulting trust, and this interest came before the building society's charge.

I do not see why there was not a resulting trust of the beneficial interest to the plaintiff, which would not, of course, be affected by section 53(1)…. If an attempted express trust fails, that seems to me just the occasion for implication of a resulting trust, whether the failure be due to uncertainty, or perpetuity, or lack of form… On the above footing it matters not whether Mr Marks was or was not debarred from relying upon section 53(1) by the principle that the section is not to be used as an instrument for fraud. Mr Marks was in fact ignorant of the plaintiff’s interest and it is forcefully argued that there is nothing fraudulent in his taking advantage of the section.

== See also ==
- English land law
