= Sunil Sabharwal =

Indian-Hungarian businessman

Sunil Sabharwal The Honorable

International Monetary Fund Board Member
- In office February 2016 - April 2018

Personal details
- Born: 1964 (age 61–62) New Delhi, India
- Education: Ohio State University; London Business School
- Occupation: Businessman

The Honorable Sunil Sabharwal (also known as Sunil Sabharwal de Bessenyey; born 1964) is a businessman, investor and former US Board Member to the International Monetary Fund (IMF). Sabharwal was born in 1964 in New Delhi, India and is of Indian-Hungarian descent. His family escaped the Hungarian People's Republic in 1983, and he later returned to set up the Budapest office of the European Bank for Reconstruction and Development (EBRD) in 1992. He was nominated for the IMF board by the White House on 3 April 2014 and received Senate confirmation on 12 February 2016, serving between February 2016 and April 2018.

Most recently, he was chairman of the board of Earthport PLC., a company listed on the London Stock Exchange AIM Market. He currently works as an independent investment adviser and speaks publicly on investing in Central and Eastern Europe, the confluence of sport, business, financial technology (FinTech), and the role of international financial institutions in a changing economy. A former fencing champion, he is also active at the high level of international sporting organizations.

== Early life and education ==
He was born in 1964 in New Delhi, India to Baldev Raj Sabharwal, a printing entrepreneur who founded the New Roxy Press in New Delhi, and Gabriella de Bessenyey, of Hungarian descent. The de Bessenyey clan is one of the oldest Hungarian noble families, tracing its lineage back to at least the 14th century, with documentary evidence of it being given a right to a coat of arms by the monarch from the 15th century. On occasion, literature refers to Sunil as Sabharwal de Bessenyey. He attended the Frank Anthony School in New Delhi, India and the Dob Utca Elementary School and Imre Madach High School in Budapest, Hungary.

Sabharwal's mother struggled in Hungary under the communist regime because she refused to join the communist party. When she tried to sell pottery to feed her family, authorities would not grant her a vendor's license. The family went to Vienna during the summer of 1983 under the auspices of a cultural tour and pleaded for asylum at the US Embassy, citing political and religious oppression. They gained sponsorship from the Upper Arlington Lutheran Church in Columbus, Ohio, with particular support from Ohio State University (OSU) Professor of Finance David Cole and his wife Edie, and arrived in Columbus in December 1983. Once in the Columbus Hungarian-American network, Sabharwal met OSU fencing coach and Hungarian Charlotte Remenyik.

Sabharwal enrolled at the Ohio State University in January 1984, excelling in both business administration studies and fencing. He was OSU's 1984 Big Ten Champion and NCAA All-American in 1984 and 1986. In 1988 he won OSU's Jack Stephenson Award for Outstanding Scholastic and Academic Achievement at the College of Business and graduated cum laude with a Bachelor of Science degree with Distinction in Marketing. He earned his Master of Science degree in management at London Business School in 1996 and a diploma in Company Direction from UK's Institute of Directors in 2009.

== Career ==
In 1992 he returned to post-Communist Hungary to set up the Budapest office of the European Bank for Reconstruction and Development (EBRD), an international finance institution created specifically to foster the transition of post-Soviet economies backed by the developed world. Soon after its establishment the EBRD became the largest investor in Central and Eastern Europe and Hungary, one of its largest fund recipients.

Sabharwal joined the board of Earthport in September 2018, became interim chairman in October, later becoming chair. He oversaw the sale of the company to Visa Inc. following a takeover battle with MasterCard, and was able to achieve a final sale price of more than four times the value of the company.

Previously, he was chairman of the board of Ogone, a European internet payment services company with headquarters in Brussels, Belgium.

Sabharwal had a 10-year private equity and mergers and acquisitions career with GE Capital in London and First Data / Western Union, in London and Paris. He served on the board of Euromedic, Central Europe's largest private healthcare services organization.

== Civic work ==
Sabharwal currently serves on the International Olympic Committee’s Sport and Environment Sustainability & Legacy Commission chaired by HSH Prince Albert II of Monaco. Sabharwal is Secretary General of the UNESCO- and IOC-affiliated International Fair Play Committee. He also has served on the board of Peace & Sport USA and the US and International Fencing Federation. He was Chairman of the International Fencing Federation's (FIE) first annual Congress held in the US, in Philadelphia in 2011 and was Chief of Mission to the US Olympic Fencing team at the Beijing Olympics in 2008. He was elected to the executive board of World Athletics.

== Personal life ==
Sabharwal resides in Washington, DC., and is married with two children.
