= City of London Building Society v Flegg =

1987 English land law case

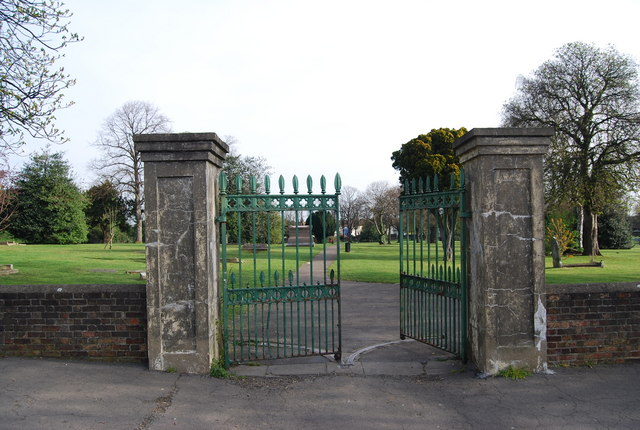
- Court: House of Lords
- Full case name: City of London Building Society v Edgar E Flegg and Joan E Flegg and others
- Citations: [1987] UKHL 6 [1988] AC 54 [1987] 3 All ER 435

Case history
- Prior action: Appellant lender lost in the Court of Appeal but earlier won before His Honour Judge Thomas whose order was restored.

Case opinions
- Decision by: Lord Templeman; Lord Oliver
- Concurrence: Lord Mackay; Lord Bridge; Lord Goff

Keywords
- Overreaching, overriding interest, actual occupation

City of London Building Society v Flegg [1987] UKHL 6 is an English land law case decided in the House of Lords on the relationship between potential overriding interests and the concept of overreaching.

The case was controversial because it construed the statutory framework so that interests which might have been overriding were denied that status because they could be overreached in appropriate circumstances. (Note: Academic work considered in Williams & Glyn's Bank v Boland [1979] speculated that clear overriding interests could not be overreached. A sale, mortgage or other dealing of two trustees for value to someone without notice (overreaching) is dealt with in works on Equity such as Snell's Principles of Equity. If a resident spouse's rights are overriding interests they will/would survive a sale by the two trustees.) In the following years, it has been questioned whether the overreaching rules, as interpreted by Flegg, are compatible with the qualified rights to peaceful enjoyment of possessions and/or the right to a family life and home guaranteed in the Convention on Human Rights. Currently it appears that they are.

== Facts ==
In 1977, Mr and Mrs Flegg sold their home of 28 years and used the £18,000 they realised to help their daughter and her husband (Mrs and Mr Maxwell-Brown) to buy a new home, Bleak House. (Note: The name for 256 Grange Road, Gillingham, Kent, under land registration as in more than 95% of homes, registered land. The Medway Towns and Portsmouth have several homes named in tribute to Charles Dickens such as this, see Bleak House and each has a museum on his works.) Their daughter and her husband, Mrs and Mr Maxwell-Brown also chose the house; they also put in the balance to buy (£16,000) by taking out a mortgage loan (with an earlier lender) which they would pay back. It was meant for them all to live in. The registered owners and therefore borrowers were the Maxwell-Browns, despite their solicitor advising all four of them be registered. The law means Mr and Mrs Flegg had an equitable property right, stake or share from their contributions which the Maxwell-Browns held on trust for them. (Note: See resulting trust for direct contributions to a purchase price). The Maxwell-Browns had money trouble and remortgaged with the City of London Building Society to raise £37,500 without the Fleggs' consent. The Fleggs were suspicious and entered a caution against dealings at the Land Registry. The two borrowers defaulted (fell into arrears with payments) and the building society sought possession.

== Judgment ==
=== Court of Appeal ===
Dillon LJ held that, reversing the decision of the High Court, the Fleggs' interest in their home was not overreached through the building society's contract with the children.

Mr. Wakefield for the plaintiffs relied, in one of his arguments to the contrary, on the wording of section 20(1)(b) of the Land Registration Act 1925 under which, as quoted above, a disposition of registered land by the registered proprietor is subject "unless the contrary is expressed on the register, to the overriding interests, if any, affecting the estate transferred or created." He submits that, because it was overreached by the plaintiffs' mortgage under the overreaching provisions of the Law of Property Act 1925, the parents' interest never affected the estate transferred to or created in the plaintiffs by their mortgage. But this argument is inconsistent with the whole scheme of the Land Registration Act 1925 as interpreted in Boland's case. Moreover, if, as Lord Wilberforce held, the interest of the equitable tenant in common in actual occupation of the land "subsisted in reference to the land" within the meaning of section 70, it must equally, in my judgment, (being an interest by way of undivided share in the whole of the land and carrying a right to occupy the whole of the land) have affected the derivative estate, by way of term of years or deemed terms of years - cf. Grand Junction Co Ltd v Bates [1954] 2 QB 160 - which is the estate in the land which the plaintiffs have by virtue of their mortgage. This was the conclusion of Lord Denning MR in Boland's case [1979] Ch 312, where he said, at p. 331:

"Being an equitable interest in the land, it is clearly an interest 'subsisting in reference' to the land. It also affects 'the estate transferred' within section 20(1)(b)."

Mr. Wakefield also relied on the words "for the time being" in the phrase in the opening words of section 70(1):

"All registered land shall,... be deemed to be subject to such of the following overriding interests as may be for the time being subsisting in reference thereto..."

He submitted that, because the parents' interest was overreached under the Law of Property Act 1925 on the creation of the plaintiffs' mortgage, it was thereafter not an overriding interest "for the time being" subsisting in reference to the land. But, again, this argument is inconsistent with the scheme of the Land Registration Act 1925 as explained in the passages in Lord Wilberforce's speech in Boland's case which I have quoted above. The argument is unreal in that the parents continued in actual occupation of the land despite the execution by the registered proprietors of the plaintiffs' mortgage of which the parents knew nothing.

Kerr LJ and Sir George Waller concurred.

=== House of Lords ===
The Judicial Committee of the House of Lords held that the building society's charge took priority, and could use the overreaching defence against the Fleggs’ pre-existing trust right. Although under the Land Registration Act 1925 section 70, people with actual occupation may have an overriding interest that would take priority over a third party, like the building society, this does not happen if the purchase money is paid to two or more trustees or a trust corporation. If that happens, under Law of Property Act 1925, section 2(1)(ii), the interests of the beneficiaries will be overreached and will attach to the purchase price, not the property.

Lord Templeman said the following.

One of the main objects of the legislation of 1925 was to effect a compromise between on the one hand the interests of the public in securing that land held in trust is freely marketable and, on the other hand, the interests of the beneficiaries in preserving their rights under the trusts. By the Settled Land Act 1925 a tenant for life may convey the settled land discharged from all the trusts powers and provisions of the settlement. By the Law of Property Act 1925 trustees for sale may convey land held on trust for sale discharged from the trusts affecting the proceeds of sale and rents and profits until sale. Under both forms of trust the protection and the only protection of the beneficiaries is that capital money must be paid to at least two trustees or a trust corporation.

Lord Oliver gave a concurring, reasoned judgment.

Lords Mackay, Bridge and Goff concurred with both.

== Significance ==
City of London BS v Flegg has come under substantial criticism, firstly, for misinterpreting the scheme of the statutes (as the Court of Appeal would have come to a different result) and more recently for potentially infringing the European Convention on Human Rights, either article 8 on the right to a home and family life, or Protocol 1, article on peaceful enjoyment of possessions. However, other commentators regard it as an accurate statement of the current law and there is no evidence to suggest that the decision contravenes the European Convention.

== See also ==
- English land law

== Notes and references ==
Notes
