= Bannister v Bannister =

English trusts law case (1948)

- Court: Court of Appeal of England and Wales
- Citation: [1948] 2 All ER 133

Keywords
- Constructive trust

Bannister v Bannister [1948] 2 All ER 133 is an English trusts law case, upholding a constructive trust of land against a relative who took title to the land, with a promise back to the transferor she could remain in her cottage for life.

== Facts ==
Mrs Bannister inherited two cottages when her husband died, including the one where she lived. She transferred them to her brother-in-law for under market value (at an undervalue). They orally agreed she would remain rent-free for life in her cottage. He sought to evict her.

== Judgment ==
Scott LJ held that for a constructive trust:

1. The conveyance need not be obtained by fraud;
2. The transfer need not use technical language of a trust;
3. No weight needed to be given to the fact that the conveyance was at an undervalue. The fraud consists in the denial of the trust. The proprietary right was given to Mrs Bannister under constructive trust.

At common law, the promise made to allow Mrs Bannister to stay in the property was not enforceable since it was not recorded in writing (as required by s40 Law of Property Act 1925—now s2 of the Law of Property (Miscellaneous Provisions) Act 1989). The upholding of Mrs Bannister's right to reside in the property follows the application of the equitable maxim, equity will not allow a statute to be used as a cloak for fraud.

== See also ==
- English trusts law
- English land law
- English property law
