= Overriding interest =

Overriding interest is an English land law concept. The general rule in registered conveyancing is that all interests and rights over a piece of land have to be written on the register entry for that land. Otherwise, when anyone buys that piece of land, the interests will not apply to the purchaser, and the rights will be lost. Overriding interests are the exception to this general rule. Overriding interests need not be registered to bind any new owner.

== Overview ==
The House of Commons, House of Lords and tasked Royal Commission preparing the Law of Property Acts (1925) agreed that for many classes of interest it would be unreasonable to expect certain interests to be registered, in which legislation they were termed overriding interests. Their list was reformed and simplified under legislation of 2002 in staggered reforms between that year and 2013.

Such interests principally include:

- Tenancies/leases of less than seven years
- Rights of people in actual occupation, perhaps unaware of their legal rights.
- Public rights of way, as it was not clear who should be made to register them.
- Rights to support from adjoining buildings or structures
- Rights to light (to particular apertures)

Under the 2002 legislation the position of:

- Rights for the historic parish church to claim for chancel repairs

has weakened, unless registered, to be valid against land owners as at 12 October 2013 and not subsequent owners according to the Church of England the body with the right enforce the rights.

The existence of overriding interests is a standard question in a transaction — it must be confirmed, denied or 'not known' under the standard property information form used across England and Wales. Nonetheless a right to light on the land or neighbouring land and clear, well-trodden paths across a garden or smallholding for example would be considered constructive knowledge under the deemed inspection of the property under Standard Condition 3.1.2(b) of Standard Conditions of Sale, present in accordance with the principle of caveat emptor (lat. buyer beware).

== Background and present safeguards ==
Overriding interests are restricted to those in Land Registration Act 2002 Schedules 1 and 3 replacing section 70 of the Land Registration Act 1925. Case law based on LPA 1925 directly equivalent provisions may still be cited in the event of disputes under the stare decisis doctrine of legal precedent.

Short-term leases (tenancies/leases of less than seven years) were excluded because to include them would entail large workloads of registration and on the basis of continuing a fluid rental and subletting market, where break clauses can be specified at will, restricted to a minimum one month's notice in the residential setting by the Landlord and Tenant Act 1985.

In a leading case, Williams & Glyn Bank v Boland, a wife successfully claimed an overriding interest in a property her husband had mortgaged to support a failing business. Although she did not have a legal (titular) interest in the property, she had made substantial contributions to the purchase and was in actual occupation of the property, her overriding interest was upheld when the bank tried to take possession.

There has been some academic debate over the effect on overriding interests of the Human Rights Act 1998. If a purchaser were to buy property, only to find themselves subject to numerous restrictive or expensive obligations about which the seller did know and not and could not have been expected to have known, it is uncertain whether they could seek damages from an encumbering public or quasi-public body under Article 8 of the European Convention on Human Rights referred to in that Act.

In any event principles of misrepresentation apply in personam (against the person, rather than to bind the property) which may instead be bound by prescriptive easements. Section 8.4 of the standard seller's Law Society Property Information Form invites the seller to confirm or deny the known examples of these interests, excluding leases which are dealt with by way of the contract for sale and purchase. Dealing with leases/tenancies is Standard Condition of Sale 3.3 on the part of the seller and the default special condition on its reverse that the property is sold with vacant possession.

== See also ==
- Land Registration Act 2002
- Leasehold estate
- Equitable interest
- Overreaching
