= Land Registration Act 2002 =

Act of the Parliament of the United Kingdom

Land Registration Act 2002 (Note: Section 136(1).)
- Act of Parliament
- Parliament of the United Kingdom
- Long title: An Act to make provision about land registration; and for connected purposes.
- Citation: 2002 c. 9
- Introduced by: Lord Chancellor Lord Irvine, 21 June 2001
- Territorial extent: England and Wales (Note: Section 136(3).)

Dates
- Royal assent: 26 February 2002
- Commencement: 13 October 2003 (Note: Section 136(2).)
Other legislation
Amends	Settled Land Act 1925; Law of Property Act 1925; Administration of Estates Act 1925; Requisitioned Land and War Works Act 1945; Law of Property (Joint Tenants) Act 1964; Gas Act 1965; Commons Registration Act 1965; Leasehold Reform Act 1967; Law of Property Act 1969; Land Charges Act 1972; Consumer Credit Act 1974; Solicitors Act 1974; House of Commons Disqualification Act 1975; Local Land Charges Act 1975; Rent Act 1977; Charging Orders Act 1979; Highways Act 1980; Inheritance Tax Act 1984; Housing Act 1985; Building Societies Act 1986; Landlord and Tenant Act 1987; Diplomatic and Consular Premises Act 1987; Criminal Justice Act 1988; Housing Act 1988; Local Government and Housing Act 1989; Water Resources Act 1991; Access to Neighbouring Land Act 1992; Further and Higher Education Act 1992; Judicial Pensions and Retirement Act 1993; Charities Act 1993; Leasehold Reform, Housing and Urban Development Act 1993; Law of Property (Miscellaneous Provisions) Act 1994; Drug Trafficking Act 1994; Landlord and Tenant (Covenants) Act 1995; Family Law Act 1996; Housing Act 1996; Education Act 1996; School Standards and Framework Act 1998; Finance Act 2000; Terrorism Act 2000; International Criminal Court Act 2001; See § Repealed enactments
Repeals/revokes	See § Repealed enactments
Amended by	Land Registration Act 2002 (Transitional Provisions) (No 2) Order 2003; Civil Partnership Act 2004; Constitutional Reform Act 2005; Regulatory Reform (Execution of Deeds and Documents) Order 2005; Commons Act 2006; Tribunals, Courts and Enforcement Act 2007; Companies Act 2006 (Consequential Amendments etc) Order 2008; Land Registration Act 2002 (Amendment) Order 2008; Companies Act 2006 (Consequential Amendments, Transitional Provisions and Savings) Order 2009; Localism Act 2011; Charities Act 2011; Cross-Border Mediation (EU Directive) Regulations 2011; Transfer of Functions (Her Majesty's Land Registry, the Meteorological Office and Ordnance Survey) Order 2011; Crime and Courts Act 2013; Transfer of Tribunal Functions Order 2013; Co-operative and Community Benefit Societies Act 2014; Infrastructure Act 2015; Deregulation Act 2015; Housing and Planning Act 2016; Enterprise and Regulatory Reform Act 2013 (Consequential Amendments) (Bankruptcy) and the Small Business, Enterprise and Employment Act 2015 (Consequential Amendments) Regulations 2016; Cross-Border Mediation (EU Directive) (EU Exit) Regulations 2019; Charities Act 2022; Economic Crime and Corporate Transparency Act 2023
Relates to	Land Registration Rules 2003; Land Registration (Amendment) Rules 2005; Land Registration (Amendment) (No.2) Rules 2005

Status: Amended

Text of statute as originally enacted

Revised text of statute as amended

Land Registration Rules 2003 (Note: Section 1.)
- Statutory Instrument
- Parliament of the United Kingdom
- Citation: SI 2003/1417
- Territorial extent: United Kingdom

Dates
- Made: 19 May 2003
- Laid before Parliament: 5 June 2003
- Commencement: 13 October 2003
Other legislation
Made under	Land Registration Act 2002
Amended by	Land Registration (Amendment) Rules 2005; Land Registration (Amendment) Rules 2008; Land Registration (Amendment) Rules 2009; Land Registration (Amendment) Rules 2011; Land Registration (Amendment) Rules 2018; Land Registration (Amendment) Rules 2022

Status: Amended

Text of statute as originally enacted

Revised text of statute as amended

The Land Registration Act 2002 (c. 9) is an act of the Parliament of the United Kingdom which repealed and replaced previous legislation governing land registration, in particular the Land Registration Act 1925, which governed an earlier, though similar, system. The act, together with the Land Registration Rules 2003 (SI 2003/1417), regulates the role and practice of HM Land Registry.

== Background ==
The Land Registration Act 2002 was introduced in response to the Law Commission and HM Land Registry report, Land Registration for the Twenty-first Century (2001). The Act:

- Simplified and modernised the law of land registration;
- Made the register reflect a more accurate picture of a title to land, showing more fully the rights and subsidiary interests that affect it; and
- Facilitated the introduction of e-conveyancing.

The act made some major changes to the law regulating registered land. Specifically, it:

- Enabled shorter leases to be registered;
- Further encouraged voluntary land registration;
- Changed the system of protection of third party rights; and
- Reformed and modernised the law of adverse possession (squatters' rights).
- Repealed the Land Transfer Act 1875
- Repealed the Land Registration Act 1925

== Land registration ==
Section 4 stipulates that registration of an estate in land is compulsory when one of the following events occurs:

- Freehold estate is transferred, whether under a sale, gift or other circumstances;
- Legal lease for more than seven years is granted;
- Legal lease with more than seven years to run is transferred; or
- Grant of a first legal charge (mortgage).

Failure to register when required, means that the purchaser or transferee gains only an equitable title to the land and the seller or transferor remains as the registered proprietor. A person with an equitable title, i.e. who has failed to register, cannot take advantage of the priority rules found in sections 29 and 30 of the Act and may be vulnerable if the (still) registered proprietor attempts another dealing with the land.

=== Grades of title ===
On first registration, the registrar awards a grade of title to each registered estate.

In the case of freehold estates, one of the following grades of title may be awarded according to s. 11 of the act:

- Absolute title – This shows there is nothing dubious about the title. The estate is vested in the proprietor and is subject only to entries on the register and unregistered interests which override (commonly called an overriding interest). Title does not have to be perfect – if the registrar believes that any defect will "not cause the holding under the title to be disturbed", absolute title will be given – s.9(3) LRA.
- Possessory freehold title – there is no documentary evidence of title (e.g. lost title deeds). Title depends on adverse possession. It conveys no guarantee of title at the time of registration, but subsequent problems (e.g. forgery of proprietor's signature) will be covered by the guarantee. It can be upgraded into absolute title after being in possession as proprietor for 12 years (s.62(1), (4)).
- Qualified freehold title – the title is subject to a fundamental defect. There is no guarantee in respect of the specified defect. It may be upgraded to absolute title if registrar is satisfied as to the title – s.62 LRA.

In the case of leasehold estates, one of the following grades of title may be awarded according to s. 12 of the act:

- Absolute leasehold title – same as absolute freehold except the proprietor is also subject to covenants in the lease
- Good leasehold title – same as absolute leasehold except the right of the landlord to grant the lease is not guaranteed
- Possessory leasehold title – same as possessory freehold
- Qualified leasehold title – same as qualified freehold

== Registrable dispositions ==
These are proprietary rights which are only legal if registered. Dispositions subject to registration according to s. 27 are:

- any transfer of a freehold, whether for value or by way of gift or on death
- the grant of a legal lease for more than seven years
- the grant of a legal lease taking effect in possession in three or more months from grant
- the grant of a legal charge (a mortgage)
- the express grant of legal easement

According to s. 27(1): "If a disposition is required to be completed by registration it does not operate at law until the relevant requirements are met."

Modern conveyancing practice has increasingly adopted digital processes to streamline these registration requirements, including electronic signatures and online submission systems that expedite the completion of registrable dispositions.

== Priority ==
According to s. 29 of the act, a person acquiring an interest under a registrable disposition for valuable consideration (being usually a freehold or leasehold, but also including a legal mortgage) and having been registered successfully as owner of the interest, takes it subject to only:

- an entry on the register, mainly a Notice in the charges register
- unregistered interests which override (overriding interests)
- interests excepted from the effects of registration (a category now otiose)
- and if the estate is a lease, to burdens incidental to the lease

All other interests are postponed to the interest under the disposition – i.e. the successfully registered purchaser's interest gets priority over all other interests.

Note: if the transferee is not a purchaser (such as the recipient of a gift, or under a will), he or she takes the title subject to all pre-existing proprietary interests affecting the land – see s.28 LRA 2002

=== Restrictions ===
A restriction on the proprietorship register prevents the registration of a disposition unless complied with.

This is the appropriate way of alerting a purchaser of the existence of an equitable family interest which arises under a trust of land. A restriction does not protect the priority of that interest, nor any right of occupation – it notifies the purchaser of the interest. In any event, in the normal case, the purchaser will overreach and in such cases it is immaterial whether the purchaser knows of the equitable family interest or not. (Law of Property Act 1925; Trusts of Land and Appointment of Trustees Act 1996)

Restrictions are also useful to control dealings with the land as a secondary means of protection. For example, a person with an option to purchase land (e.g. a developer) should protect that interest by means of a Notice. However, they may also enter a restriction to prevent, or to be alerted to, any attempt to transfer the land in breach of the option.

=== Notices ===
According to s. 32 of the act: "A notice is an entry on the [charges] register in respect of a burden of an interest affecting a registered estate or charge."

According to s. 33, the following interests cannot be protected by a notice:

- the interest of a beneficiary under a trust of land
- a lease granted for less than three years
- restrictive covenants in a lease
- and certain other minor property rights.

In all cases, these interests are protected against a purchaser by other means.

According to s. 34, all other interests may be protected by a notice. Examples include:

- equitable easements
- freehold restrictive covenants
- equitable leases
- estate contracts, including options to purchase and rights of pre-emption.

== Adverse possession ==
The act is known for the changes it has made to the rules regulating adverse possession in relation to registered land (the rules applicable to unregistered land remain the same, and 12 years possession is still required to obtain title).

The act provides that anyone who occupies registered land without permission from the owner and treats it as his own for 10 years is entitled to apply to be registered as owner, although the system introduced by the act means that few claims will succeed. Specifically, according to paragraph 1(1) of schedule 6 to the act:

A person may apply to the registrar to be registered as the proprietor of a registered estate in land if he has been in adverse possession of the estate for the period of ten years ending on the date of the application.

The Land Registry is obliged to notify the registered proprietor of the land that an application for possessory title has been made. The registered proprietor then has 65 business days to object to the registration. The objection may dispute the applicant's right to be registered as owner or, more usually, the registered proprietor will claim the benefit of the process found in paragraph 5 of schedule 6. This provides that a registered proprietor who objects has a further two years to evict the adverse possessor. It will be enough to secure eviction within these two years that the registered proprietor relies on their registered title. No other reason need be given. Failure to secure the eviction of the adverse possessor within these two years gives the adverse possessor the right to re-apply to be registered and such a second application will be successful.

In three special cases, the adverse possessor may be registered as proprietor without having to wait for two further years and even if the proprietor objects. These special cases usually arise because the adverse possessor has some other reason for claiming ownership in addition to their possession for (at least) 10 years.

The new rules regulating adverse possession can be found in Part 9 of the act, and the rules regulating the procedures for registration of an adverse possessor can be found at Schedule 6 to the act.

These rules are much more difficult to satisfy than the common law with regard to adverse possession, although it is now clear that all rules of adverse possession (in unregistered land, under the LRA 1925 and under the LRA 2002) are human rights compliant, see generally the judgment of the Grand Chamber of the European Court of Human Rights in J. A. Pye (Oxford) Ltd and Another v United Kingdom. Cobb and Fox's article argues that the 2002 act unjustly favours landowners in claims of adverse possession (through paragraphs 2 and 3 of Schedule 6), whilst overlooking the moral issues surrounding squatting. The reform brought by the 2002 act holds the view that intentional squatting "...at least in some cases, is tantamount to sanctioning a theft of land'". Meanwhile, the registered proprietor is deemed 'blameless' even where the property has been forgotten, with the 2002 act "...designed to protect registered proprietors from the possibility of such oversight or inadvertence". Therefore, Cobb and Fox have argued the current law overlooks the moral justifications of adverse possession, such as increasingly unaffordable housing and to prevent 'stagnating land', instead enforcing the view that "advertent squatters are morally blameworthy" for their intentional trespassing, "while landowners are morally blameless".

A registered proprietor need simply object and then proceed to evict within two years. The adverse possessor's claim is therefore vulnerable under the 2002 act and the registered proprietor is protected in all but the most unusual circumstances.

After the passage of the act, local councils and other organisations with large land holdings began the systematic registration of their land in order to prevent title being lost to squatters.

== Objection and adjudication ==
Anybody may make an objection to the Registrar about an application (s.73). The Registrar must advise the applicant and, so long as the objection is not groundless, must dispose of the objection by agreement between the parties. If agreement cannot be reached, the matter must be referred to the Land Registration Division, Property Chamber, First Tier Tribunal (formerly called the Adjudicator to HM Land Registry) who is appointed by the Lord Chancellor (ss.107–114). The tribunal also hears appeals from aggrieved persons on decisions of the Registrar as to access to the Land Registry Network (Sch.5).

The tribunal can make any order which the High Court could make for the rectification or setting aside of certain dispositions, contracts and other documents affecting interests in land. Appeals from the decision of the Regulator can be made to the High Court (s.111).

== Repealed enactments ==
Section 135 of the act repealed 55 enactments, listed in schedule 13 to the act.

Citation	Short title	Extent of repeal
25 & 26 Vict. c. 53	Land Registry Act 1862	The whole act.
15 & 16 Geo. 5. c. 18	Settled Land Act 1925	Section 119(3).
15 & 16 Geo. 5. c. 20	Law of Property Act 1925	In section 84(8), the words from ", but" to the end.
15 & 16 Geo. 5. c. 20	Law of Property Act 1925	In section 205(1)(xxii), the words from ", and" to the end.
15 & 16 Geo. 5. c. 21	Land Registration Act 1925	The whole act.
16 & 17 Geo. 5. c. 11	Law of Property (Amendment) Act 1926	Section 5.
26 Geo. 5 & 1 Edw. 8. c. 26	Land Registration Act 1936	The whole act.
8 & 9 Geo. 6. c. 43	Requisitioned Land and War Works Act 1945	Section 37(3).
7 & 8 Eliz. 2. c. 72	Mental Health Act 1959	In Schedule 7, the entry relating to the Land Registration Act 1925.
8 & 9 Eliz. 2. c. 58	Charities Act 1960	In Schedule 6, the entry relating to the Land Registration Act 1925.
1968 c. 64	Civil Evidence Act 1968	In the Schedule, the entry relating to the Land Registration Act 1925.
1969 c. 48	Post Office Act 1969	In Schedule 4, paragraph 27.
1969 c. 59	Law of Property Act 1969	Section 28(7).
1971 c. 54	Land Registration and Land Charges Act 1971	The whole act.
1972 c. 11	Superannuation Act 1972	In Schedule 6, paragraph 16.
1972 c. 70	Local Government Act 1972	In Schedule 29, paragraph 26.
1974 c. 47	Solicitors Act 1974	Section 75(b).
1975 c. 7	Finance Act 1975	In Schedule 12, paragraph 5.
1975 c. 76	Local Land Charges Act 1975	Section 19(3).
1975 c. 76	Local Land Charges Act 1975	In Schedule 1, the entry relating to the Land Registration Act 1925.
1976 No. 4	Endowments and Glebe Measure 1976	In Schedule 5, paragraph 1.
1977 c. 38	Administration of Justice Act 1977	Sections 24 and 26.
1979 c. 53	Charging Orders Act 1979	Section 3(3).
1979 c. 53	Charging Orders Act 1979	Section 7(4).
1980 c. 58	Limitation Act 1980	In section 17, paragraph (b) and the preceding "and".
1980 c. 66	Highways Act 1980	Section 251(5).
1981 c. 24	Matrimonial Homes and Property Act 1981	Section 4.
1982 c. 53	Administration of Justice Act 1982	Sections 66 and 67 and Schedule 5.
1983 c. 20	Mental Health Act 1983	In Schedule 4, paragraph 6.
1984 c. 51	Capital Transfer Tax Act 1984	In Schedule 8, paragraph 1.
1985 c. 61	Administration of Justice Act 1985	In section 34, in subsection (1), paragraph (b) and the preceding "and" and, in subsection (2), paragraph (b).
1985 c. 61	Administration of Justice Act 1985	In Schedule 2, paragraph 37(b).
1985 c. 65	Insolvency Act 1985	In Schedule 8, paragraph 5.
1985 c. 68	Housing Act 1985	Section 36(3).
1985 c. 68	Housing Act 1985	Section 154(1), (6) and (7).
1985 c. 68	Housing Act 1985	Section 156(3).
1985 c. 68	Housing Act 1985	Section 168(5).
1985 c. 68	Housing Act 1985	In Schedule 9A, paragraphs 2(1), 3 and 5(3).
1986 c. 26	Land Registration Act 1986	Sections 1 to 4.
1986 c. 45	Insolvency Act 1986	In Schedule 14, the entry relating to the Land Registration Act 1925.
1986 c. 53	Building Societies Act 1986	In Schedule 2A, in paragraph 1, sub-paragraph (4) and, in sub-paragraph (5), the definition of "registered land" and the preceding "and".
1986 c. 53	Building Societies Act 1986	In Schedule 18, paragraph 2.
1986 c. 53	Building Societies Act 1986	In Schedule 21, paragraph 9(b).
1986 No. 3	Patronage (Benefices) Measure 1986	Section 6.
1987 c. 31	Landlord and Tenant Act 1987	Section 28(6).
1987 c. 31	Landlord and Tenant Act 1987	In Schedule 4, paragraphs 1 and 2.
1987 c. 46	Diplomatic and Consular Premises Act 1987	In Schedule 1, in paragraph 1, the words from "and expressions" to the end.
1988 c. 3	Land Registration Act 1988	The whole act.
1988 c. 33	Criminal Justice Act 1988	Section 77(13).
1988 c. 33	Criminal Justice Act 1988	In Schedule 15, paragraphs 6 and 7.
1988 c. 50	Housing Act 1988	In Schedule 11, paragraph 2(3).
1989 c. 26	Finance Act 1989	Sections 178(2)(e) and 179(1)(a)(iv).
1990 c. 41	Courts and Legal Services Act 1990	In Schedule 10, paragraph 3.
1990 c. 41	Courts and Legal Services Act 1990	In Schedule 17, paragraph 2.
1992 c. 23	Access to Neighbouring Land Act 1992	Section 5(2) and (3).
1993 c. 28	Leasehold Reform, Housing and Urban Development Act 1993	Section 97(3).
1993 c. 28	Leasehold Reform, Housing and Urban Development Act 1993	In Schedule 21, paragraph 1.
1994 c. 21	Coal Industry Act 1994	In Schedule 9, paragraph 1.
1994 c. 36	Law of Property (Miscellaneous Provisions) Act 1994	In Schedule 1, paragraph 2.
1994 c. 37	Drug Trafficking Act 1994	Section 26(13).
1994 c. 37	Drug Trafficking Act 1994	In Schedule 1, paragraph 1.
1996 c. 27	Family Law Act 1996	Section 31(11).
1996 c. 27	Family Law Act 1996	In Schedule 8, paragraph 45.
1996 c. 47	Trusts of Land and Appointment of Trustees Act 1996	In Schedule 3, paragraph 5.
1996 c. 52	Housing Act 1996	Section 11(4).
1996 c. 53	Housing Grants, Construction and Regeneration Act 1996	Section 138(3).
1997 c. 2	Land Registration Act 1997	Sections 1 to 3 and 5(4) and (5).
1997 c. 2	Land Registration Act 1997	In Schedule 1, paragraphs 1 to 6.
1999 c. 29	Greater London Authority Act 1999	Section 219.
2000 c. 11	Terrorism Act 2000	In Schedule 4, paragraph 8(2) and (3).
2000 c. 29	Trustee Act 2000	In Schedule 2, paragraph 26.
2001 c. 17	International Criminal Court Act 2001	In Schedule 6, paragraph 7(2).

== See also ==
- English land law

== Bibliography ==
- Abbey, R. M.; Richards, M. (2002). Blackstone's Guide to the Land Registration Act 2002. Oxford: Oxford University Press. ISBN 0-19-925796-5.
- Clarke, I. (2003). Wolstenholme and Cherry's Annotated Land Registration Act 2002. London: Sweet & Maxwell. ISBN 0-421-85150-3.
- Department of Constitutional Affairs (June 2001). "Land Registration Bill – Regulatory Impact Assessment".
- Dowden, M. (2005). Practitioner's Guide to the Land Registration Act 2002: The Unfinished Revolution. London: Estates Gazette. ISBN 0-7282-0458-4.
- Dyer, Clare (9 July 2002). "Britain's biggest ever land-grab". The Guardian.
- Harpum, C.; Bignell, J. (2004). Registered Land: Law and Practice Under the Land Registration Act 2002. London: Jordans. ISBN 085308890X.
- Hill, G.; et al. (2005). The Land Registration Act 2002. London: Butterworths Law. ISBN 0-406-95764-9.
- Law Commission & HM Land Registry (2001) Land Registration for the Twenty-first Century – A Conveyancing Revolution, London: The Stationery Office
- Office of Public Sector Information (2002). "Explanatory Notes to Land Registration Act 2002". The National Archives.
