= List of acts of the Parliament of the United Kingdom from 1922 =

This is a complete list of acts of the Parliament of the United Kingdom for the year 1922.

Note that the first parliament of the United Kingdom was held in 1801; parliaments between 1707 and 1800 were either parliaments of Great Britain or of Ireland). For acts passed up until 1707, see the list of acts of the Parliament of England and the list of acts of the Parliament of Scotland. For acts passed from 1707 to 1800, see the list of acts of the Parliament of Great Britain. See also the list of acts of the Parliament of Ireland.

For acts of the devolved parliaments and assemblies in the United Kingdom, see the list of acts of the Scottish Parliament, the list of acts of the Northern Ireland Assembly, and the list of acts and measures of Senedd Cymru; see also the list of acts of the Parliament of Northern Ireland.

The number shown after each act's title is its chapter number. Acts passed before 1963 are cited using this number, preceded by the year(s) of the reign during which the relevant parliamentary session was held; thus the Union with Ireland Act 1800 is cited as "39 & 40 Geo. 3 c. 67", meaning the 67th act passed during the session that started in the 39th year of the reign of George III and which finished in the 40th year of that reign. Note that the modern convention is to use Arabic numerals in citations (thus "41 Geo. 3" rather than "41 Geo. III"). Acts of the last session of the Parliament of Great Britain and the first session of the Parliament of the United Kingdom are both cited as "41 Geo. 3". Acts passed from 1963 onwards are simply cited by calendar year and chapter number.

== 12 & 13 Geo. 5 ==
The fifth session of the 31st Parliament of the United Kingdom, which met from 7 February 1922 until 26 October 1922.

This session was also traditionally cited as 12 & 13 G. 5.

=== Public general acts ===
Short title	Citation	Royal assent
Long title
Consolidated Fund (No. 1) Act 1922 (repealed)	12 & 13 Geo. 5. c. 1	2 March 1922
An Act to apply a sum out of the Consolidated Fund to the service of the year ending on the thirty-first day of March one thousand nine hundred and twenty-two. (Repealed by Statute Law Revision Act 1950 (14 Geo. 6. c. 6))
Coroners (Emergency Provisions Continuance) Act 1922 (repealed)	12 & 13 Geo. 5. c. 2	2 March 1922
An Act to continue temporarily the Coroners (Emergency Provisions) Act, 1917, (Note: Coroners (Emergency Provisions) Act 1917 (7 & 8 Geo. 5. c. 19)) and section seven of the Juries Act, 1918. (Note: Juries Act 1918 (8 & 9 Geo. 5. c. 23)) (Repealed by Statute Law Revision Act 1950 (14 Geo. 6. c. 6))
Consolidated Fund (No. 2) Act 1922 (repealed)	12 & 13 Geo. 5. c. 3	29 March 1922
An Act to apply certain sums out of the Consolidated Fund to the service of the years ending on the thirty-first day of March, one thousand nine hundred and twenty-one, one thousand nine hundred and twenty-two, and one thousand nine hundred and twenty-three. (Repealed by Statute Law Revision Act 1950 (14 Geo. 6. c. 6))
Irish Free State (Agreement) Act 1922 (repealed)	12 & 13 Geo. 5. c. 4	31 March 1922
An Act to give the force of Law to certain Articles of Agreement for a Treaty between Great Britain and Ireland, and to enable effect to be given thereto, and for other purposes incidental thereto or consequential thereon. (Repealed by Statute Law (Repeals) Act 1989 (c. 43))
Pawnbrokers Act 1922 (repealed)	12 & 13 Geo. 5. c. 5	12 April 1922
An Act to increase the charges made by Pawnbrokers. (Repealed by Pawnbrokers Act 1960 (8 & 9 Eliz. 2. c. 24))
Army and Air Force (Annual) Act 1922 (repealed)	12 & 13 Geo. 5. c. 6	12 April 1922
An Act to provide, during Twelve Months, for the Discipline and Regulation of the Army and Air Force. (Repealed by Statute Law Revision Act 1950 (14 Geo. 6. c. 6) and Revision of the Army and Air Force Acts (Transitional Provisions) Act 1955 (3 & 4 Eliz. 2. c. 20))
Unemployment Insurance Act 1922 (repealed)	12 & 13 Geo. 5. c. 7	12 April 1922
An Act to amalgamate the rates of contribution and the rates of benefit under the Unemployment Insurance Acts, 1920 (Note: Unemployment Insurance Act 1920 (10 & 11 Geo. 5. c. 30)) and 1921, (Note: Unemployment Insurance Act 1921 (11 & 12 Geo. 5. c. 1)) and the Unemployed Workers' Dependants (Temporary Provision) Act, 1921, (Note: Unemployed Workers' Dependants (Temporary Provision) Act 1921 (11 & 12 Geo. 5. c. 62)) otherwise to amend the Unemployment Insurance Acts, 1920 and 1921, and to repeal the Unemployed Workers' Dependants (Temporary Provision) Act, 1921, and for purposes connected therewith. (Repealed by Unemployment Insurance Act 1935 (25 & 26 Geo. 5. c. 8))
Diseases of Animals Act 1922 (repealed)	12 & 13 Geo. 5. c. 8	12 April 1922
An Act to remove temporarily the limit on the moneys provided by Parliament for the purposes of the Diseases of Animals Acts. (Repealed by Statute Law Revision Act 1950 (14 Geo. 6. c. 6))
East India Loans (Railways and Irrigation) Act 1922 (repealed)	12 & 13 Geo. 5. c. 9	12 April 1922
An Act to empower the Secretary of State in Council of India to raise money in the United Kingdom for the service of the Government of India and for other purposes relating thereto. (Repealed by East India Loans Act 1937 (1 Edw. 8 & 1 Geo. 6. c. 14))
Kenya Divorces (Validity) Act 1922 (repealed)	12 & 13 Geo. 5. c. 10	12 April 1922
An Act to make provision with respect to the validity of Decrees granted in the Kenya Colony and Protectorate for the dissolution of the marriage of persons domiciled in the United Kingdom. (Repealed by Statute Law (Repeals) Act 1975 (c. 10))
Juries Act 1922 (repealed)	12 & 13 Geo. 5. c. 11	31 May 1922
An Act to amend the law with respect to the preparation of Jurors Books, and otherwise to amend the law relating to Jurors and Juries, in England and Wales. (Repealed by Criminal Justice Act 1972 (c. 71))
Representation of the People Act 1922 (repealed)	12 & 13 Geo. 5. c. 12	31 May 1922
An Act to alter certain dates prescribed by the Representation of the People Act, 1918, (Note: Representation of the People Act 1918 (7 & 8 Geo. 5. c. 64)) in connexion with the registration of electors, and to amend section fifty-four of the Local Government Act, 1888. (Note: Local Government Act 1888 (51 & 52 Vict. c. 41)) (Repealed by Representation of the People Act 1948 (11 & 12 Geo. 6. c. 65))
Empire Settlement Act 1922 (repealed)	12 & 13 Geo. 5. c. 13	31 May 1922
An Act to make better provision for furthering British settlement in His Majesty's Oversea Dominions. (Repealed by Statute Law (Repeals) Act 1976 (c. 16))
Audit (Local Authorities, &c.) Act 1922 (repealed)	12 & 13 Geo. 5. c. 14	29 June 1922
An Act to make provision with respect to the period for which certain accounts subject to audit by district auditors are to be made up and audited, and to authorise the holding of extraordinary audits of any such accounts. (Repealed by Local Government Act 1933 (23 & 24 Geo. 5. c. 51))
Government of the Soudan Loan (Amendment) Act 1922 (repealed)	12 & 13 Geo. 5. c. 15	29 June 1922
An Act to amend the Government of the Soudan Loan Act, 1919. (Note: Government of the Soudan Loan Act 1919 (9 & 10 Geo. 5. c. 43)) (Repealed by Statute Law Revision Act 1958 (6 & 7 Eliz. 2. c. 46))
Law of Property Act 1922	12 & 13 Geo. 5. c. 16	29 June 1922
An Act to assimilate and amend the law of Real and Personal Estate, to abolish copyhold and other special tenures, to amend the law relating to commonable lands and of intestacy, and to amend the Wills Act, 1837, (Note: Wills Act 1837 (7 Will. 4 & 1 Vict. c. 26)) the Settled Land Acts, 1882 to 1890, the Conveyancing Acts, 1881 to 1911, the Trustee Act, 1893, (Note: Trustee Act 1893 (56 & 57 Vict. c. 53)) and the Land Transfer Acts, 1875 (Note: Land Transfer Act 1875 (38 & 39 Vict. c. 87)) and 1897. (Note: Land Transfer Act 1897 (60 & 61 Vict. c. 65))
Finance Act 1922	12 & 13 Geo. 5. c. 17	20 July 1922
An Act to grant certain Duties of Customs and Inland Revenue (including Excise), to alter other Duties, and to amend the Law relating to Customs and Inland Revenue (including Excise), and the National Debt, and to make further provision in connection with Finance.
Infanticide Act 1922 (repealed)	12 & 13 Geo. 5. c. 18	20 July 1922
An Act to provide that a woman who wilfully causes the death of her newly-born child may, under certain conditions, be convicted of infanticide. (Repealed for England and Wales by Infanticide Act 1938 (1 & 2 Geo. 6. c. 36) and for Northern Ireland by Infanticide Act (Northern Ireland) 1939 (3 & 4 Geo. 6. c. 5 (N.I.)))
Gaming Act 1922 (repealed)	12 & 13 Geo. 5. c. 19	20 July 1922
An Act to repeal section two of the Gaming Act, 1835. (Note: Gaming Act 1835 (5 & 6 Will. 4. c. 41)) (Repealed for England and Wales and Scotland by Statute Law Revision Act 1953 (2 & 3 Eliz. 2. c. 5) and for Northern Ireland by Statute Law Revision Act (Northern Ireland) 1954 (c. 35 (N.I.)))
Indian High Courts Act 1922 (repealed)	12 & 13 Geo. 5. c. 20	20 July 1922
An Act to make further provision with respect to the qualifications of Judges of High Courts in British India. (Repealed by Government of India Act 1935 (26 Geo. 5 & 1 Edw. 8. c. 2))
Treaties of Washington Act 1922 (repealed)	12 & 13 Geo. 5. c. 21	20 July 1922
An Act for enabling effect to be given to two Treaties signed at Washington on behalf of His Majesty and certain other Powers. (Repealed by Statute Law Revision Act 1959 (7 & 8 Eliz. 2. c. 68))
Summer Time Act 1922 (repealed)	12 & 13 Geo. 5. c. 22	20 July 1922
An Act to provide for the time in Great Britain, Northern Ireland, the Channel Islands, and the Isle of Man being in advance of Greenwich mean time during a certain period of the year. (Repealed by Summer Time Act 1972 (c. 6))
Harbours, Docks, and Piers (Temporary Increase of Charges) Act 1922 (repealed)	12 & 13 Geo. 5. c. 23	20 July 1922
An Act to amend and extend the duration of the Harbours, Docks, and Piers (Temporary Increase of Charges) Act, 1920. (Note: Harbours, Docks, and Piers (Temporary Increase of Charges) Act 1920 (10 & 11 Geo. 5. c. 21)) (Repealed by Statute Law Revision Act 1966 (c. 5))
Government of Northern Ireland (Loan Guarantee) Act 1922	12 & 13 Geo. 5. c. 24	20 July 1922
An Act to authorise the Treasury to guarantee payment of the principal of and the interest on loans to be raised by the Government of Northern Ireland.
British Empire Exhibition (Amendment) Act 1922 (repealed)	12 & 13 Geo. 5. c. 25	20 July 1922
An Act to remove doubts as to the powers of the Board of Trade under the British Empire Exhibition (Guarantee) Act, 1920. (Note: British Empire Exhibition (Guarantee) Act 1920 (10 & 11 Geo. 5. c. 74)) (Repealed by Statute Law Revision Act 1950 (14 Geo. 6. c. 6))
Anglo-Persian Oil Company (Payment of Calls) Act 1922 (repealed)	12 & 13 Geo. 5. c. 26	20 July 1922
An Act to provide money for the payment of calls on share capital in the Anglo-Persian Oil Company, Limited, acquired under the Anglo-Persian Oil Company (Acquisition of Capital) Amendment Act, 1919, (Note: Anglo-Persian Oil Company (Acquisition of Capital) Amendment Act 1919 (9 & 10 Geo. 5. c. 86)) and to amend the law with respect to the application of dividends or interest on capital held in the said Company. (Repealed by Statute Law Revision Act 1958 (6 & 7 Eliz. 2. c. 46))
Canals (Continuance of Charging Powers) Act 1922 (repealed)	12 & 13 Geo. 5. c. 27	20 July 1922
An Act for the continuance of Charging Powers in respect of Canal or Inland Navigation Undertakings of which possession was retained or taken by the Minister of Transport under the Ministry of Transport Act, 1919. (Note: Ministry of Transport Act 1919 (9 & 10 Geo. 5. c. 50)) (Repealed by Statute Law Revision Act 1966 (c. 5))
Bread Acts Amendment Act 1922 (repealed)	12 & 13 Geo. 5. c. 28	20 July 1922
An Act to amend the enactments relating to the provision of regulations for the making and sale of bread, and for preventing the adulteration of meal, flour, and bread. (Repealed by Food and Drugs Act 1938 (1 & 2 Geo. 6. c. 56))
Sale of Tea Act 1922 (repealed)	12 & 13 Geo. 5. c. 29	20 July 1922
An Act to provide for the better protection of the public in relation to the sale of tea. (Repealed by Sale of Food (Weights and Measures) Act 1926 (16 & 17 Geo. 5. c. 63))
Unemployment Insurance (No. 2) Act 1922 (repealed)	12 & 13 Geo. 5. c. 30	20 July 1922
An Act to amend section four of the Unemployment Insurance Act, 1922, (Note: Unemployment Insurance Act 1922 (12 & 13 Geo. 5. c. 7)) so far as relates to the third special period mentioned in that Act. (Repealed by Unemployment Insurance Act 1923 (13 & 14 Geo. 5. c. 2))
Universities (Scotland) Act 1922	12 & 13 Geo. 5. c. 31	20 July 1922
An Act to extend the powers of the Courts of the Universities of Scotland in the making of Ordinances for the superannuation and pensioning of Principals and Professors, and for the admission of Lecturers and Readers to the Senatus Academicus, and to provide for the admission of Lecturers and Readers to membership of the General Councils of those Universities.
Appropriation Act 1922 (repealed)	12 & 13 Geo. 5. c. 32	4 August 1922
An Act to apply a sum out of the Consolidated Fund to the service of the year ending on the thirty-first day of March one thousand nine hundred and twenty-three, and to appropriate the Supplies granted in this Session of Parliament. (Repealed by Statute Law Revision Act 1950 (14 Geo. 6. c. 6))
Public Works Loans Act 1922 (repealed)	12 & 13 Geo. 5. c. 33	4 August 1922
An Act to grant money for the purpose of certain Local Loans out of the Local Loans Fund, and for other purposes relating to Local Loans. (Repealed by Housing Act 1925 (15 & 16 Geo. 5. c. 14), Housing (Scotland) Act 1925 (15 & 16 Geo. 5. c. 15) and Statute Law Revision Act 1950 (14 Geo. 6. c. 6))
Whale Fisheries (Scotland) (Amendment) Act 1922 (repealed)	12 & 13 Geo. 5. c. 34	4 August 1922
An Act to make further provision with respect to the cancelling or suspending of licences under the Whale Fisheries (Scotland) Act, 1907. (Note: Whale Fisheries (Scotland) Act 1907 (7 Edw. 7. c. 41)) (Repealed by Fisheries Act 1981 (c. 29))
Celluloid and Cinematograph Film Act 1922 (repealed)	12 & 13 Geo. 5. c. 35	4 August 1922
An Act to make better provision for the prevention of fire in premises where raw celluloid or cinematograph film is stored or used. (Repealed for England and Wales and Scotland by Health and Safety (Miscellaneous Repeals, Revocations and Amendments) Regulations 2013 (SI 2013/448) and for Northern Ireland by Health and Safety (Miscellaneous Repeals, Revocations and Amendments) Regulations (Northern Ireland) 2015 (SR (NI) 2015/223) (Note: Incorrectly cited as "SR (NI) 2015/233" in the Chronological Table of the Statutes.))
Isle of Man (Customs) Act 1922 (repealed)	12 & 13 Geo. 5. c. 36	4 August 1922
An Act to amend the Law with respect to Customs in the Isle of Man. (Repealed by Statute Law Revision Act 1950 (14 Geo. 6. c. 6))
Naval Discipline Act 1922 (repealed)	12 & 13 Geo. 5. c. 37	4 August 1922
An Act to amend the Naval Discipline Act. (Note: Naval Discipline Act 1866 (29 & 30 Vict. c. 109)) (Repealed by Naval Discipline Act 1957 (5 & 6 Eliz. 2. c. 53))
National Health Insurance Act 1922 (repealed)	12 & 13 Geo. 5. c. 38	4 August 1922
An Act to make further provision with respect to the cost of medical benefit and to the expenses of the administration of benefits under the Acts relating to National Health Insurance to repeal section two and to amend section twenty-nine of the National Health Insurance Act, 1918, (Note: National Health Insurance Act 1918 (7 & 8 Geo. 5. c. 62)) and for purposes connected therewith. (Repealed by National Health Insurance Act 1936 (26 Geo. 5 & 1 Edw. 8. c. 32))
Oil in Navigable Waters Act 1922 (repealed)	12 & 13 Geo. 5. c. 39	4 August 1922
An Act to make provision against the discharge or escape of oil into navigable waters. (Repealed by Oil in Navigable Waters Act 1955 (3 & 4 Eliz. 2. c. 25))
Air Ministry (Kenley Common Acquisition) Act 1922	12 & 13 Geo. 5. c. 40	4 August 1922
An Act to confirm an agreement between the Mayor and Commonalty and Citizens of the City of London and the President of the Air Council in relation to the acquisition of certain lands in the county of Surrey, and for purposes in connection therewith.
Representation of the People (No. 2) Act 1922 (repealed)	12 & 13 Geo. 5. c. 41	4 August 1922
An Act to amend section thirty-four of the Representation of the People Act, 1918, as respects offences under that section committed by bodies of persons. (Repealed by Representation of the People Act 1948 (11 & 12 Geo. 6. c. 65))
School Teachers (Superannuation) Act 1922 (repealed)	12 & 13 Geo. 5. c. 42	4 August 1922
An Act to provide for the payment of contributions by teachers towards the cost of benefits under the School Teachers (Superannuation) Act, 1918, (Note: School Teachers (Superannuation) Act 1918 (8 & 9 Geo. 5. c. 55)) and for matters incidental thereto, and to make provision as to the calculation of average salary for the purposes of the said Act. (Repealed by Teachers' Superannuation Act 1965 (c. 83))
Post Office (Pneumatic Tubes Acquisition) Act 1922 (repealed)	12 & 13 Geo. 5. c. 43	4 August 1922
An Act to confirm an agreement made between the Pneumatic Despatch Company, Limited, and the Postmaster-General for the acquisition by the Postmaster-General of a certain tube running between St. Martin's-le-Grand in the City of London and Eversholt Street, in the Metropolitan Borough of St. Pancras, and for purposes connected therewith. (Repealed by Post Office Act 1969 (c. 48))
British Nationality and Status of Aliens Act 1922 (repealed)	12 & 13 Geo. 5. c. 44	4 August 1922
An Act to amend the British Nationality and Status of Aliens Acts, 1914 (Note: British Nationality and Status of Aliens Act 1914 (4 & 5 Geo. 5. c. 17)) and 1918, (Note: British Nationality and Status of Aliens Act 1918 (8 & 9 Geo. 5. c. 38)) as respects the acquisition of British nationality by persons born out of His Majesty's Dominions. (Repealed by British Nationality Act 1948 (11 & 12 Geo. 6. c. 56))
Telegraph (Money) Act 1922 (repealed)	12 & 13 Geo. 5. c. 45	4 August 1922
An Act to provide for raising further Money for the purpose of the Telegraph Acts, 1863 to 1921. (Repealed by Statute Law Revision Act 1953 (2 & 3 Eliz. 2. c. 5))
Electricity (Supply) Act 1922 (repealed)	12 & 13 Geo. 5. c. 46	4 August 1922
An Act to amend the law with respect to the supply of electricity. (Repealed by Electricity Act 1989 (c. 29))
Railway and Canal Commission (Consents) Act 1922 (repealed)	12 & 13 Geo. 5. c. 47	4 August 1922
An Act to amend the Law as respects certain matters in connection with which the consent of the Railway and Canal Commission is required. (Repealed by Statute Law Revision Act 1950 (14 Geo. 6. c. 6))
Education (Scotland) (Superannuation) Act 1922 (repealed)	12 & 13 Geo. 5. c. 48	4 August 1922
An Act to provide for the payment of contributions towards the costs of benefits under the scheme framed and approved in terms of the Education (Scotland) (Superannuation) Act, 1919, (Note: Education (Scotland) (Superannuation) Act 1919 (9 & 10 Geo. 5. c. 17)) and for matters incidental thereto, and for the payment from the Consolidated Fund of deferred annuities in respect of contributions under the Elementary School Teachers (Superannuation) Act, 1898. (Note: Elementary School Teachers (Superannuation) Act 1898 (61 & 62 Vict. c. 57)) (Repealed by Education (Scotland) Act 1946 (9 & 10 Geo. 6. c. 72))
Post Office (Parcels) Act 1922 (repealed)	12 & 13 Geo. 5. c. 49	4 August 1922
An Act to amend the Law with respect to the Remuneration of Railway Companies for the conveyance of Parcels. (Repealed by Post Office Act 1953 (1 & 2 Eliz. 2. c. 36))
Expiring Laws Act 1922 (repealed)	12 & 13 Geo. 5. c. 50	4 August 1922
An Act to deal with certain Expiring Laws by making some of them permanent, repealing others, and continuing the remainder for a limited period. (Repealed by Statute Law (Repeals) Act 1977 (c. 18))
Allotments Act 1922	12 & 13 Geo. 5. c. 51	4 August 1922
An Act to amend the law relating to Allotments.
Allotments (Scotland) Act 1922 (repealed)	12 & 13 Geo. 5. c. 52	4 August 1922
An Act to amend the Law relating to Allotments in Scotland. (Repealed by Community Empowerment (Scotland) Act 2015 (asp 6))
War Service Canteens (Disposal of Surplus) Act 1922 (repealed)	12 & 13 Geo. 5. c. 53	4 August 1922
An Act to make provision with respect to the disposal of sums received in respect of the carrying on and liquidation of the Expeditionary Force Canteens and the Navy and Army Canteen Board. (Repealed by Statute Law Revision Act 1959 (7 & 8 Eliz. 2. c. 68))
Milk and Dairies (Amendment) Act 1922 (repealed)	12 & 13 Geo. 5. c. 54	4 August 1922
An Act to postpone for a further period the operation of the Milk and Dairies (Consolidation) Act, 1915, (Note: Milk and Dairies (Consolidation) Act 1915 (5 & 6 Geo. 5. c. 66)) and the Milk and Dairies (Scotland) Act, 1914, (Note: Milk and Dairies (Scotland) Act 1914 (4 & 5 Geo. 5. c. 46)) to make further provision with regard to the sale of milk and for purposes connected therewith. (Repealed by Food Safety Act 1990 (c. 16))
Constabulary (Ireland) Act 1922 (repealed)	12 & 13 Geo. 5. c. 55	4 August 1922
An Act to make provision for the disbandment of the Royal Irish Constabulary and with respect to magistrates appointed under the Acts relating to that Force, and for the validation of things done or omitted in the execution or purported execution of those Acts, and for other purposes incidental thereto. (Repealed by Police (Northern Ireland) Act 1998 (c. 32))
Criminal Law Amendment Act 1922 (repealed)	12 & 13 Geo. 5. c. 56	4 August 1922
An Act to amend the law with respect to offences against persons under the age of sixteen, and with respect to penalties under section thirteen of the Criminal Law Amendment Act, 1885, (Note: Criminal Law Amendment Act 1885 (48 & 49 Vict. c. 69)) and to repeal section five of the Punishment of Incest Act, 1908. (Note: Punishment of Incest Act 1908 (8 Edw. 7. c. 45)) (Repealed for England and Wales by Sexual Offences Act 1956 (4 & 5 Eliz. 2. c. 69) and for Scotland by Sexual Offences (Scotland) Act 1976 (c. 67))
Solicitors Act 1922 (repealed)	12 & 13 Geo. 5. c. 57	4 August 1922
An Act to make further provision with respect to the qualifications of persons proposing to become or to practise as Solicitors. (Repealed by Solicitors Act 1932 (22 & 23 Geo. 5. c. 37))
Ecclesiastical Tithe Rentcharges (Rates) Act 1922 (repealed)	12 & 13 Geo. 5. c. 58	4 August 1922
An Act to amend the Ecclesiastical Tithe Rentcharge (Rates) Act, 1920, (Note: Ecclesiastical Tithe Rentcharge (Rates) Act 1920 (10 & 11 Geo. 5. c. 22)) in respect of the relief or abatement to an owner of tithe rentcharge who holds more than one benefice. (Repealed by Tithe Act 1925 (15 & 16 Geo. 5. c. 87))
Local Government and other Officers' Superannuation Act 1922 (repealed)	12 & 13 Geo. 5. c. 59	4 August 1922
An Act to provide for the Superannuation of Persons employed by Local Authorities and other Public Bodies. (Repealed by Local Government Superannuation Act 1937 (1 Edw. 8 & 1 Geo. 6. c. 68) and Local Government Superannuation (Scotland) Act 1937 (1 Edw. 8 & 1 Geo. 6. c. 69))
Lunacy Act 1922 (repealed)	12 & 13 Geo. 5. c. 60	4 August 1922
An Act to amend the law relating to Chancery Lunatics. (Repealed by Mental Health Act 1959 (7 & 8 Eliz. 2. c. 72))

=== Local acts ===
Short title	Citation	Royal assent
Long title
Lanarkshire County Council Order Confirmation Act 1922 (repealed)	12 & 13 Geo. 5. c. i	29 March 1922
An Act to confirm a Provisional Order under the Private Legislation Procedure (Scotland) Act 1899 (Note: Private Legislation Procedure (Scotland) Act 1899 (62 & 63 Vict. c. 47)) relating to Lanarkshire County Council. (Repealed by Lanarkshire County Council Order Confirmation Act 1939 (2 & 3 Geo. 6. c. xcii))
	Lanarkshire County Council Order 1922 Provisional Order to authorise the district committee of the Middle Ward of the county of Lanark to construct additional waterworks to extend the time for the completion of authorised works to amend the Lanarkshire (Middle Ward District) Water Acts 1892 to 1917 to enable the County Council of the said county to borrow additional money to provide for the purchase by the County Council of the undertaking of the Bothwell and Uddingston Gas Company Limited to amend the Lanarkshire Gas Orders 1914 and 1917 to apply to the said county certain provisions of the Burgh Police (Scotland) Acts 1892 (Note: Burgh Police (Scotland) Act 1892 (55 & 56 Vict. c. 55)) and 1903 (Note: Burgh Police (Scotland) Act 1903 (3 Edw. 7. c. 33)) and for other purposes.	
Stirling Corporation (Water, &c.) Order Confirmation Act 1922	12 & 13 Geo. 5. c. ii	29 March 1922
An Act to confirm a Provisional Order under the Private Legislation Procedure (Scotland) Act 1899 relating to Stirling Corporation (Water &c.).
	Stirling Corporation (Water, &c.) Order 1922 Provisional Order to confer further powers on the Stirling Waterworks Commissioners and on the Town Council of Stirling to regulate the administration of Cowane's and Spittal's Hospitals and the Stirling Educational Trust and for other purposes.	
Kilmarnock Gas Order Confirmation Act 1922	12 & 13 Geo. 5. c. iii	29 March 1922
An Act to confirm a Provisional Order under the Burgh Police (Scotland) Act 1892 relating to Kilmarnock Gas.
	Kilmarnock Gas Order 1922 Kilmarnock Gas. Provisional Order.	
Provisional Order (Marriages) Confirmation Act 1922 (repealed)	12 & 13 Geo. 5. c. iv	12 April 1922
An Act to confirm a Provisional Order made by one of His Majesty's Principal Secretaries of State under the Provisional Order (Marriages) Act 1905. (Note: Provisional Order (Marriages) Act 1905 (5 Edw. 7. c. 23)) (Repealed by Statute Law (Repeals) Act 1977 (c. 18))
	St. Matthew and Oxhey Chapel Order.	
Highland Railway Order Confirmation Act 1922	12 & 13 Geo. 5. c. v	12 April 1922
An Act to confirm a Provisional Order under the Private Legislation Procedure (Scotland) Act 1899 relating to the Highland Railway.
	Highland Railway Order 1922 Provisional Order to extend the time for the completion of certain railways authorised by the Highland Railway (Additional Powers) Act 1897 (Note: Highland Railway (Additional Powers) Act 1897 (60 & 61 Vict. c. ccxvi)) to sanction and confirm the purchase of certain lands and for other purposes.	
Tees Conservancy Act 1922 (repealed)	12 & 13 Geo. 5. c. vi	12 April 1922
An Act to amend the Tees Conservancy Act 1919. (Note: Tees Conservancy Act 1919 (9 & 10 Geo. 5. c. xxvi)) (Repealed by Tees and Hartlepool Port Authority Act 1966 (c. xxv))
Madras Railway Annuities Act 1922 (repealed)	12 & 13 Geo. 5. c. vii	12 April 1922
An Act to amend the Madras Railway Annuities Act 1908. (Note: Madras Railway Annuities Act 1908 (8 Edw. 7. c. iii)) (Repealed by Statute Law (Repeals) Act 2013 (c. 2))
Milford Docks Act 1922 (repealed)	12 & 13 Geo. 5. c. viii	12 April 1922
An Act to amend and consolidate the enactments relating to the payment of interest on the debenture stock A and the debenture stock B of the Milford Docks Company and for other purposes. (Repealed by Milford Docks Act 1930 (20 & 21 Geo. 5. c. lxxi))
Ministry of Health Provisional Order Confirmation (Cardiff Extension) Act 1922 (repealed)	12 & 13 Geo. 5. c. ix	31 May 1922
An Act to confirm a Provisional Order of the Minister of Health relating to Cardiff. (Repealed by County of South Glamorgan Act 1976 (c. xxxv))
	Cardiff (Extension) Order 1921 Provisional Order made in pursuance of the Local Government Act 1888 (Note: Local Government Act 1888 (51 & 52 Vict. c. 41)) for the extension of a County Borough.	
Melville Trust Order Confirmation Act 1922	12 & 13 Geo. 5. c. x	31 May 1922
An Act to confirm a Provisional Order under the Private Legislation Procedure (Scotland) Act 1899 relating to the Melville Trust.
	Melville Trust Order 1922 Provisional Order to incorporate a body of Trustees for the administration of the estate of the late George Fisher Melville to enable the Trustees to sell or otherwise deal with that estate and to confer other powers on the Trustees in relation thereto to vary in other respects the testamentary writings of the said George Fisher Melville and to make provision for the application of the residue of the said estate and for other purposes.	
Kilmarnock Water Order Confirmation Act 1922	12 & 13 Geo. 5. c. xi	31 May 1922
An Act to confirm a Provisional Order under the Burgh Police (Scotland) Act 1892 relating to Kilmarnock Water.
	Kilmarnock Water Order 1922 Kilmarnock Water. Provisional Order.	
Ayr Burgh (Tramways, &c.) Order Confirmation Act 1922	12 & 13 Geo. 5. c. xii	31 May 1922
An Act to confirm a Provisional Order under the Private Legislation Procedure (Scotland) Act 1899 relating to Ayr Burgh (Tramways &c.).
	Ayr Burgh (Tramways, &c.) Order 1922 Provisional Order to authorise the provost magistrates and councillors of the Burgh of Ayr to double portion of their tramways and to execute street works to make further provision with regard to their tramways and water undertakings and in relation to markets and slaughterhouses to vary direction under will and provide for disposal of estate of Robert Templeton deceased to increase the public health general assessment and for other purposes.	
Pilotage Orders Confirmation (No. 2) Act 1922 (repealed)	12 & 13 Geo. 5. c. xiii	31 May 1922
An Act to confirm certain Pilotage Orders made by the Board of Trade under the Pilotage Act 1913 (Note: Pilotage Act 1913 (2 & 3 Geo. 5. c. 31)) relating to pilotage in the Pilotage Districts of The Dee Hartlepool Sunderland The Tees and The Tyne. (Repealed by Statute Law (Repeals) Act 1995 (c. 44))
	Dee Pilotage Order 1922 The Dee Pilotage Order.	
	Hartlepool Pilotage Order 1922 Hartlepool Pilotage Order.	
	Sunderland Pilotage Order 1922 Sunderland Pilotage Order.	
	The Tees Pilotage Order 1922 The Tees Pilotage Order.	
	The Tyne Pilotage Order 1922 The Tyne Pilotage Order.	
Leicester Freemen's Act 1922	12 & 13 Geo. 5. c. xiv	31 May 1922
An Act to change the name and extend the powers of the Deputies of the Resident Freemen and Freemen's Widows of the Borough of Leicester and to amend the Leicester Freemen's Acts 1845 (Note: Leicester Freemen's Act 1845 (8 & 9 Vict. c. 6 Pr.)) and 1898. (Note: Leicester Freemen's Act 1898 (61 & 62 Vict. c. clxxxix))
Nottingham Corporation (Trent Navigation) Act 1922	12 & 13 Geo. 5. c. xv	31 May 1922
An Act to extend the period limited by the Nottingham Corporation (Trent Navigation Transfer) Act 1915 (Note: Nottingham Corporation (Trent Navigation Transfer) Act 1915 (5 & 6 Geo. 5. c. lxvi)) for the construction of certain works to empower the corporation of Nottingham to borrow further money in respect of such works or some of them and for other purposes.
Metropolitan Railway Act 1922	12 & 13 Geo. 5. c. xvi	31 May 1922
An Act to authorise the Metropolitan Railway Company to guarantee and subscribe moneys in respect of the British Empire Exhibition (Note: British Empire Exhibition.) and for other purposes.
Legal and General Assurance Society Limited Act 1922	12 & 13 Geo. 5. c. xvii	31 May 1922
An Act to provide for the substitution of a memorandum and articles of association for the existing constitution and regulations of the Legal and General Assurance Society Limited and to repeal the Legal and General Life Assurance Society's Act 1878 (Note: Legal and General Life Assurance Society's Act 1878 (41 & 42 Vict. c. xxiii)) and the Legal and General Assurance Society's Act 1919 (Note: Legal and General Assurance Society's Act 1919 (9 & 10 Geo. 5. c. xx)) and for other purposes.
Ossett Corporation (Water) Act 1922 (repealed)	12 & 13 Geo. 5. c. xviii	31 May 1922
An Act to confer further powers on the mayor aldermen and burgesses of the borough of Ossett with respect to the supply of water and for other purposes. (Repealed by West Yorkshire Act 1980 (c. xiv))
Newhaven and Seaford Water Act 1922 (repealed)	12 & 13 Geo. 5. c. xix	31 May 1922
An Act to confer further powers on the Newhaven and Seaford Water Company and for other purposes. (Repealed by Mid-Sussex Water Order 1985 (SI 1985/513))
Blackburn Corporation Act 1922	12 & 13 Geo. 5. c. xx	31 May 1922
An Act to extend the boundaries of the borough of Blackburn to confer upon the Corporation further powers with respect to their water gas and electricity undertakings to consolidate the local rates leviable in the borough to make better provision for the health local government and finance of the borough and for other purposes.
City of London (Various Powers) Act 1922	12 & 13 Geo. 5. c. xxi	31 May 1922
An Act to authorise further improvements at Spitalfields Market and to empower the Corporation of London to charge expenses in connection with the said market and certain other expenses to the general rate to make provision with reference to the superannuation and pension funds of the Corporation and for other purposes.
Stoke-on-Trent (Gas Consolidation) Act 1922	12 & 13 Geo. 5. c. xxii	31 May 1922
An Act for empowering the mayor aldermen and burgesses of the borough of Stoke-on-Trent to acquire the Staffordshire Potteries Undertaking of the British Gas Light Company Limited to amalgamate that undertaking and the existing gas undertakings of the mayor aldermen and burgesses aforesaid and to consolidate the special Acts and Orders relating thereto and for other purposes.
Yorkshire Electric Power Act 1922 (repealed)	12 & 13 Geo. 5. c. xxiii	31 May 1922
An Act to confer further powers on the Yorkshire Electric Power Company. (Repealed by Statute Law (Repeals) Act 1989 (c. 43))
Sheffield Gas Act 1922 (repealed)	12 & 13 Geo. 5. c. xxiv	31 May 1922
An Act to make new provision as to the prices to be charged by and the application of the profits of the Sheffield Gas Company and for other purposes. (Repealed by Sheffield Gas (Consolidation) Act 1929 (c.xii))
Northampton Corporation Act 1922	12 & 13 Geo. 5. c. xxv	31 May 1922
An Act to confer further powers upon the Corporation of Northampton with reference to their water undertaking and to increase the water rates leviable by them to empower the Corporation to provide and work omnibuses to consolidate the local rates leviable in the borough to authorise the Corporation to borrow further moneys and for other purposes.
Sunderland and South Shields Water Act 1922	12 & 13 Geo. 5. c. xxvi	31 May 1922
An Act for authorising the Sunderland and South Shields Water Company to construct new works and to raise additional capital and for other purposes.
Trafford Park Act 1922	12 & 13 Geo. 5. c. xxvii	31 May 1922
An Act to empower the Trafford Park Company to make and maintain a railway in the parish and urban district of Stretford in the county of Lancaster to sanction and confirm the existing railways of the Company to raise additional capital and for other purposes.
Nottingham and Derbyshire Tramways Act 1922 (repealed)	12 & 13 Geo. 5. c. xxviii	29 June 1922
An Act to authorise the Nottinghamshire and Derbyshire Tramways Company to construct additional tramways and for other purposes. (Repealed by Statute Law (Repeals) Act 1995 (c. 44))
Bradford Canal (Abandonment) Act 1922	12 & 13 Geo. 5. c. xxix	29 June 1922
An Act to authorise the Leeds and Liverpool Canal Company and the undertakers of the Aire and Calder Navigation to abandon the Bradford Canal and to sell or dispose of the site thereof and of the property connected therewith and for other purposes.
Bristol Corporation Act 1922	12 & 13 Geo. 5. c. xxx	29 June 1922
An Act to empower the lord mayor aldermen and burgesses of the city of Bristol to construct works in connection with their dock undertaking and for other purposes.
Stock Conversion and Investment Trust Limited (North Western Trust) Act 1922	12 & 13 Geo. 5. c. xxxi	29 June 1922
An Act to vary certain provisions of the trust deed relating to the London and North Western Trust of the Stock Conversion and Investment Trust Limited and for other purposes.
Rugby School Act 1922	12 & 13 Geo. 5. c. xxxii	29 June 1922
An Act to dissolve the Trustees of the Rugby Charity founded by Lawrence Sheriff grocer of London and to transfer their property powers and duties to the Governing Body of Rugby School and for other purposes.
Colne Valley Water Act 1922	12 & 13 Geo. 5. c. xxxiii	29 June 1922
An Act for extending the limits of supply of the Colne Valley Water Company for authorising the Company to construct new works and to raise additional capital for increasing the charges of the Company and for other purposes.
Caledonian Railway Order Confirmation Act 1922	12 & 13 Geo. 5. c. xxxiv	29 June 1922
An Act to confirm a Provisional Order under the Private Legislation Procedure (Scotland) Act 1899 relating to the Caledonian Railway.
	Caledonian Railway Order 1922 Provisional Order to confer further powers on the Caledonian Railway Company in relation to their undertaking to confirm a deviation of their Crieff Branch Railway to authorise the Company to acquire lands to extend the time for the completion of certain works and for the purchase of land to empower the Company and the Lanarkshire and Ayrshire Railway Company to hold and dispose of superfluous lands and for other purposes.	
Land Drainage Provisional Order Confirmation (No. 1) Act 1922	12 & 13 Geo. 5. c. xxxv	29 June 1922
An Act to confirm a Provisional Order under the Land Drainage Act 1918 (Note: Land Drainage Act 1918 (8 & 9 Geo. 5. c. 17)) relating to an area in the Parishes of Appleton Roebuck Copmanthorpe Acaster Malbis Acaster Selby Bolton Percy Colton and Bishopthorpe in the West Riding of Yorkshire.
	Land Drainage (West Yorkshire) Order 1922 In the matter of a proposed Drainage District in the Parishes of Appleton Roebuck Copmanthorpe Acaster Malbis Acaster Selby Bolton Percy Colton and Bishopthorpe in the West Riding of Yorkshire.	
Oxford and St. Albans Wine Privileges (Abolition) Act 1922	12 & 13 Geo. 5. c. xxxvi	29 June 1922
An Act to abolish certain rights and privileges of the City of Oxford and of the City of St. Albans in connection with the sale of wine and the granting of licences therefor and for purposes incidental thereto.
Pilotage Orders Confirmation (No. 1) Act 1922 (repealed)	12 & 13 Geo. 5. c. xxxvii	20 July 1922
An Act to confirm certain Pilotage Orders made by the Board of Trade under the Pilotage Act 1913 relating to pilotage in the Pilotage Districts of the Humber Boston and Spalding King's Lynn and Wisbech. (Repealed by Statute Law (Repeals) Act 1995 (c. 44))
	The Humber Pilotage Order 1922 The Humber Pilotage Order.	
	Boston and Spalding Pilotage Order 1922 Boston and Spalding Pilotage Order.	
	King's Lynn Pilotage Order 1922 King's Lynn Pilotage Order.	
	Wisbech Pilotage Order 1922 Wisbech Pilotage Order.	
Pilotage Orders Confirmation (No. 3) Act 1922 (repealed)	12 & 13 Geo. 5. c. xxxviii	20 July 1922
An Act to confirm certain Pilotage Orders made by the Board of Trade under the Pilotage Act 1913 relating to pilotage in the Pilotage Districts of Blyth and Buckie and in those under the jurisdiction of the Corporation of the Trinity House of Newcastle-upon-Tyne. (Repealed by Statute Law (Repeals) Act 1995 (c. 44))
	Blyth Pilotage Order 1922 Blyth Pilotage Order.	
	Buckie Pilotage Order 1922 Buckie Pilotage Order.	
	Newcastle-upon-Tyne (Trinity House) Pilotage Order 1922 Newcastle-upon-Tyne (Trinity House) Pilotage Order.	
Ministry of Health Provisional Orders Confirmation (No. 2) Act 1922	12 & 13 Geo. 5. c. xxxix	20 July 1922
An Act to confirm certain Provisional Orders of the Minister of Health relating to Bingley Birkenhead Bognor Chichester and Weymouth and Melcombe Regis.
	Bingley Order 1922 Provisional Order for partially repealing altering and amending the Bingley Improvement Act 1847. (Note: Bingley Improvement Act 1847 (10 & 11 Vict. c. cclviii))	
	Birkenhead Order 1922 Provisional Order for altering the Birkenhead Corporation Act 1881 (Note: Birkenhead Corporation Act 1881 (44 & 45 Vict. c. cliii)) the Birkenhead Corporation (Ferries) Act 1897 (Note: Birkenhead Corporation (Ferries) Act 1897 (60 & 61 Vict. c. c)) the Birkenhead Corporation Water Act 1907 (Note: Birkenhead Corporation Water Act 1907 (7 Edw. 7. c. cxxxi)) the Birkenhead Corporation Act 1914 (Note: Birkenhead Corporation Act 1914 (4 & 5 Geo. 5. c. lxxxvi)) and the Ministry of Health Provisional Orders Confirmation (No. 7) Act 1920. (Note: Ministry of Health Provisional Orders Confirmation (No. 7) Act 1920 (10 & 11 Geo. 5. c. cxiv))	
	Bognor Order 1922 Provisional Order for altering certain Local Acts.	
	Chichester Order 1922 Provisional Order for partially repealing altering and amending the Chichester Corporation Water Act 1897. (Note: Chichester Corporation Water Act 1897 (60 & 61 Vict. c. xlvii))	
	Weymouth and Melcombe Regis Order 1922 Provisional Order for altering or amending the Weymouth and Melcombe Regis Corporation Act 1914. (Note: Weymouth and Melcombe Regis Corporation Act 1914 (4 & 5 Geo. 5. c. clxxiv))	
Ministry of Health Provisional Orders Confirmation (No. 3) Act 1922	12 & 13 Geo. 5. c. xl	20 July 1922
An Act to confirm certain Provisional Orders of the Minister of Health relating, to Derby Ellesmere Port and Whitby Newark Oldham and the Rhymney Valley Sewerage Board.
	Derby Order 1922 Provisional Order for altering or amending the Derby Corporation Act 1913. (Note: Derby Corporation Act 1913 (3 & 4 Geo. 5. c. xcii))	
	Ellesmere Port and Whitby Order 1922 Provisional Order for altering the Ellesmere Port and Whitby Urban District Council Act 1914. (Note: Ellesmere Port and Whitby Urban District Council Act 1914 (4 & 5 Geo. 5. c. xciii))	
	Newark Order 1922 Provisional Order for altering a Confirming Act. (Note: Local Government Board's Provisional Orders Confirmation (No. 5) Act 1901 (1 Edw. 7. c. cxlvii))	
	Oldham Order 1922 Provisional Order for altering the Oldham Borough Improvement Act 1865. (Note: Oldham Borough Improvement Act 1865 (28 & 29 Vict. c. cccxi))	
	Rhymney Valley Sewerage Board Order 1922 Provisional Order altering the Rhymney Valley Sewerage Board Act 1912 (Note: Rhymney Valley Sewerage Board Act 1912 (2 & 3 Geo. 5. c. lxxxviii)) and the Ministry of Health Provisional Orders Confirmation (No. 1) Act 1919. (Note: Ministry of Health Provisional Orders Confirmation (No. 1) Act 1919 (9 & 10 Geo. 5. c. cxiv))	
Ministry of Health Provisional Orders Confirmation (No. 5) Act 1922	12 & 13 Geo. 5. c. xli	20 July 1922
An Act to confirm certain Provisional Orders of the Minister of Health relating to Godalming Salford Scunthorpe and Frodingham Tunbridge Wells and Warrington.
	Godalming Order 1922 Provisional Order for partially repealing altering or amending the Godalming Corporation Water Act 1899. (Note: Godalming Corporation Water Act 1899 (62 & 63 Vict. c. ccix))	
	Salford Order 1922 Provisional Order for altering or amending the Salford Corporation Act 1920. (Note: Salford Corporation Act 1920 (10 & 11 Geo. 5. c. cxlviii))	
	Scunthorpe and Frodingham Order 1922 Provisional Order for altering and amending certain Local Acts.	
	Tunbridge Wells Order 1922 Provisional Order for partially repealing and altering certain Confirming Acts.	
	Warrington Order 1922 Provisional Order for partially repealing altering and amending certain Local Acts and a Confirming Act. (Note: Local Government Board's Provisional Orders Confirmation (No. 20) Act 1896 (59 & 60 Vict. c. clxix))	
Ministry of Health Provisional Orders Confirmation (No. 6) Act 1922	12 & 13 Geo. 5. c. xlii	20 July 1922
An Act to confirm certain Provisional Orders of the Minister of Health relating to Ashton-inMakerfield Abergavenny Gravesend Keighley and Swansea.
	Ashton-in-Makerfield Order 1922 Provisional Order for partially repealing altering and amending the Ashton-in-Makerfield Local Board Act 1875. (Note: Ashton-in-Makerfield Local Board Act 1875 (38 & 39 Vict. c. xxxviii))	
	Abergavenny Order 1922 Provisional Order for altering and amending the Abergavenny Improvement Act 1871. (Note: Abergavenny Improvement Act 1871 (34 & 35 Vict. c. xcii))	
	Gravesend Order 1922 Provisional Order to enable the Local Authority for the Borough of Gravesend to put in force the Compulsory Clauses of the Lands Clauses Acts.	
	Keighley Order 1922 Provisional Order to enable the Local Authority for the Borough of Keighley to put in force the Compulsory Clauses of the Lands Clauses Acts.	
	Swansea Order 1922 Provisional Order to enable the Local Authority for the Borough of Swansea to put in force the Compulsory Clauses of the Lands Clauses Acts.	
Ministry of Health Provisional Order Confirmation (Water) Act 1922	12 & 13 Geo. 5. c. xliii	20 July 1922
An Act to confirm a Provisional Order of the Minister of Health relating to Rainham Water.
	Rainham Water Order 1922 Provisional Order under the Gas and Water Works Facilities Act 1870 (Note: Gas and Water Works Facilities Act 1870 (33 & 34 Vict. c. 70)) and the Gas and Water Works Facilities Act 1870 Amendment Act 1873 (Note: Gas and Water Works Facilities Act 1870 Amendment Act 1873 (36 & 37 Vict. c. 89)) for empowering the Rainham Waterworks Company Limited to maintain and continue waterworks for increasing the rates leviable by and the capital of the Company and for other purposes.	
Ministry of Health Provisional Order Confirmation (Guildford Extension) Act 1922 (repealed)	12 & 13 Geo. 5. c. xliv	20 July 1922
An Act to confirm a Provisional Order of the Minister of Health relating to Guildford. (Repealed by Surrey Act 1985 (c. iii))
	Guildford (Extension) Order 1922 Provisional Order made in pursuance of the Local Government Act 1888 for the extension of a Borough.	
Dumfries and Maxwelltown Waterworks Order Confirmation Act 1922	12 & 13 Geo. 5. c. xlv	20 July 1922
An Act to confirm a Provisional Order under the Private Legislation Procedure (Scotland) Act 1899 relating to Dumfries and Maxwelltown Waterworks.
	Dumfries and Maxwelltown Waterworks Order 1922 Provisional Order to confer further powers on the Dumfries and Maxwelltown Waterworks Commissioners with regard to their water undertaking to authorise them to borrow further moneys and for other purposes.	
Girvan Water Order Confirmation Act 1922	12 & 13 Geo. 5. c. xlvi	20 July 1922
An Act to confirm a Provisional Order under the Private Legislation Procedure (Scotland) Act 1899 relating to Girvan Water.
	Girvan Water Order 1922 Provisional Order to authorise the provost magistrates and councillors of the burgh of Girvan to provide an additional water supply and to construct and maintain new waterworks and for other purposes.	
Buckhaven and Leven Gas Commission Order Confirmation Act 1922	12 & 13 Geo. 5. c. xlvii	20 July 1922
An Act to confirm a Provisional Order under the Private Legislation Procedure (Scotland) Act 1899 relating to Buckhaven and Leven Gas.
	Buckhaven and Leven Gas Commission Order 1922 Provisional Order to constitute Joint Gas Commissioners for the burgh of Buckhaven Methil and Innerleven and the burgh of Leven to transfer to the Commissioners the gas undertakings formerly owned by the East Wemyss and Buckhaven Gas Light Company Limited and the Leven and Methil Gas Company Limited and now owned and carried on by the provost magistrates and councillors of the burgh of Buckhaven Methil and Innerleven to confer powers on the said Commissioners and for other purposes.	
Glasgow Corporation Order Confirmation Act 1922	12 & 13 Geo. 5. c. xlviii	20 July 1922
An Act to confirm a Provisional Order under the Private Legislation Procedure (Scotland) Act 1899 relating to Glasgow Corporation.
	Glasgow Corporation Order 1922 Provisional Order to confer further powers on the Corporation of the City of Glasgow in connection with their tramway undertaking for the construction of new tramways and tramroads and for the provision and working of omnibuses within and outwith the City and for other purposes.	
Aberdeen Corporation Order Confirmation Act 1922 (repealed)	12 & 13 Geo. 5. c. xlix	20 July 1922
An Act to confirm a Provisional Order under the Private Legislation Procedure (Scotland) Act 1899 relating to Aberdeen Corporation. (Repealed by Aberdeen Corporation (Administration Finance, &c.) Order Confirmation Act 1940 (3 & 4 Geo. 6. c. iii))
	Aberdeen Corporation Order 1922 Provisional Order to authorise the Corporation of the City and Royal Burgh of Aberdeen to construct additional tramways and a new street or road to borrow further moneys for street works and the extension of the esplanade and for the tramway and gas undertakings and to make provision for other purposes.	
Pier and Harbour Orders Confirmation Act 1922	12 & 13 Geo. 5. c. l	20 July 1922
An Act to confirm certain Provisional Orders made by the Minister of Transport under the General Pier and Harbour Act 1861 (Note: General Pier and Harbour Act 1861 (24 & 25 Vict. c. 45)) relating to Oulton Broad and Portknockie.
	Lowestoft (Oulton Broad) Order 1922 Provisional Order in relation to Oulton Broad in the Borough Oulton Broad, of Lowestoft in the Administrative County of East Suffolk.	
	Portknockie Harbour Order 1922 Provisional Order empowering the Provost Magistrates and Councillors of the Burgh of Portknockie in the County Banff to extend and improve the Undertaking known as Portknockie Harbour and authorising them to borrow money and for other purposes.	
Board of Education Scheme (Dewsbury Endowed Schools Foundation) Confirmation Act 1922	12 & 13 Geo. 5. c. li	20 July 1922
An Act to confirm a Scheme approved and certified by the Board of Education under the Charitable Trusts Act 1853 (Note: Charitable Trusts Act 1853 (16 & 17 Vict. c. 137)) relating to the Dewsbury Endowed Schools Foundation.
	Scheme approved and certified by the Board of Education under the Charitable Trusts Acts 1853 to 1894 in the matter of the Foundations together named the Dewsbury Endowed Schools Foundation.	
Tramways Order Confirmation Act 1922	12 & 13 Geo. 5. c. lii	20 July 1922
An Act to confirm a Provisional Order made by the Minister of Transport under the Tramways Act 1870 (Note: Tramways Act 1870 (33 & 34 Vict. c. 78)) relating to Morecambe Corporation Tramways.
	Morecambe Corporation Tramways Order 1922 Order authorising the Corporation of Morecambe to construct and work a new tramway and the use of mechanical power on the existing tramways of the Corporation in the Borough of Morecambe and for other purposes.	
Stretford and District Gas Board Act 1922	12 & 13 Geo. 5. c. liii	20 July 1922
An Act to constitute and incorporate a joint board consisting of representatives of the urban district councils of Stretford Ashton-upon-Mersey and Sale and the rural district councils of Barton-upon-Irwell and Bucklow and to authorise such Board to acquire from the lord mayor aldermen and citizens of the city of Manchester the undertaking lately belonging to the Stretford Gas Company and for other purposes.
Worthing Corporation Act 1922	12 & 13 Geo. 5. c. liv	20 July 1922
An Act to empower the mayor aldermen and burgesses of the borough of Worthing to construct additional waterworks to extend the respective areas within which the Corporation may supply water and electricity to make further provision in regard to the water electricity baths parks and other undertakings of the Corporation and the health local government and improvement of the borough to consolidate the rates of the borough and for other purposes.
Croydon Gas Act 1922	12 & 13 Geo. 5. c. lv	20 July 1922
An Act to convert the existing capital of the Croydon Gas Company to authorise the raising of additional capital and for other purposes.
Torquay Corporation (Electricity) Act 1922	12 & 13 Geo. 5. c. lvi	20 July 1922
An Act to provide for the transfer of the electricity undertaking of the Urban Electric Supply Company Limited at Newton Abbot in the county of Devon to the mayor aldermen and burgesses of the borough of Torquay to extend the area for the supply of electricity by the said mayor aldermen and burgesses and to make further provision in regard to their electricity undertaking.
Dartmouth Harbour Act 1922 (repealed)	12 & 13 Geo. 5. c. lvii	20 July 1922
An Act to alter the constitution of the Dartmouth Harbour Commissioners and the tolls to be taken at the quays at Dartmouth and for other purposes. (Repealed by Dartmouth Harbour Act 1951 (14 & 15 Geo. 6. c. xxxiii))
Newcastle and Gateshead Waterworks Act 1922 (repealed)	12 & 13 Geo. 5. c. lviii	20 July 1922
An Act to authorise the Newcastle and Gateshead Water Company to raise additional moneys by borrowing to increase the powers of charging for water supplied by that Company and for other purposes. (Repealed by Newcastle and Gateshead Water (Consolidation etc.) Order 1982 (SI 1982/1718))
Great Northern Railway Act 1922	12 & 13 Geo. 5. c. lix	20 July 1922
An Act to authorise the Great Northern Railway Company to acquire certain lands and to confer other powers upon that Company to authorise the Great Northern and Great Eastern Joint Committee to acquire certain lands to authorise the Midland and Great Northern Railways Joint Committee to acquire certain lands and to confer other powers upon that joint committee and for other purposes.
Padiham Urban District Council Act 1922	12 & 13 Geo. 5. c. lx	20 July 1922
An Act to empower the urban district council of Padiham to construct additional waterworks and to make further provision in regard to their water undertaking to make street improvements and to confer various powers in regard to the health and for the improvement and good government of the district and for other purposes.
London County Council (Money) Act 1922 (repealed)	12 & 13 Geo. 5. c. lxi	20 July 1922
An Act to regulate the expenditure on capital account and lending of money by the London County Council during the financial period from the first day of April one thousand nine hundred and twenty-two to the thirtieth day of September one thousand nine hundred and twenty-three and for other purposes. (Repealed by London County Council (Loans) Act 1955 (4 & 5 Eliz. 2. c. xxvi))
London County Council (General Powers) Act 1922 (repealed)	12 & 13 Geo. 5. c. lxii	20 July 1922
An Act to empower the London County Council to acquire lands to amend the law relating to the cleansing of filthy or verminous articles and premises to confer powers upon the council of the metropolitan borough: of Paddington and for other purposes. (Repealed by Local Law (Greater London Council and Inner London Boroughs) Order 1965 (SI 1965/540))
London Electric and City and South London Railways Act 1922	12 & 13 Geo. 5. c. lxiii	20 July 1922
An Act to empower the London Electric and City and South London Railway Companies to raise additional capital to confer further powers on those Companies and for other purposes.
Swansea Corporation Act 1922	12 & 13 Geo. 5. c. lxiv	20 July 1922
An Act to confer upon the corporation of the borough of Swansea further powers with respect to their electricity undertaking to make better provision for the health local government and finance of the borough and for other purposes.
Windsor Royal Gas Act 1922	12 & 13 Geo. 5. c. lxv	20 July 1922
An Act to empower the Windsor Royal Gaslight Company to sell gas on a heat unit basis to make new provisions as to charges for gas and the application of the profits of the Company to confer further financial powers upon the Company to extend the limits of supply and for other purposes.
Halifax Corporation Act 1922	12 & 13 Geo. 5. c. lxvi	20 July 1922
An Act to empower the Corporation of Halifax to construct additional waterworks and for other purposes.
South Wales Electrical Power Distribution Company Act 1922	12 & 13 Geo. 5. c. lxvii	20 July 1922
An Act to make further provision in regard to the undertaking of the South Wales Electrical Power Distribution Company.
Staffordshire Potteries Waterworks Act 1922	12 & 13 Geo. 5. c. lxviii	20 July 1922
An Act to enable the Staffordshire Potteries Waterworks Company to construct additional waterworks to extend the time for construction of works to increase the charges of the Company to raise additional capital and for other purposes.
Shepton Mallet Waterworks Act 1922	12 & 13 Geo. 5. c. lxix	4 August 1922
An Act to confer further powers upon the Shepton Mallet Waterworks Company.
Port of London and Midland Railway Act 1922	12 & 13 Geo. 5. c. lxx	4 August 1922
An Act to authorise the Port of London Authority to construct a floating landing stage and other works at Tilbury and for vesting a part of such stage in the Midland Railway Company to authorise the Midland Railway Company to construct an extension of the said landing stage and to divert a road at Tilbury to extend the time for the purchase of lands authorised by the Port of London Act 1917 (Note: Port of London Act 1917 (7 & 8 Geo. 5. c. xliv)) and for other purposes.
River Cam Conservancy Act 1922	12 & 13 Geo. 5. c. lxxi	4 August 1922
An Act to alter the constitution of the Conservators appointed under the River Cam Navigation Act 1851 (Note: River Cam Navigation Act 1851 (14 & 15 Vict. c. xcii)) to extend the jurisdiction of and confer further powers upon the said Conservators to amend the provisions of the said Act of 1851 and for other purposes.
Doncaster Corporation Act 1922	12 & 13 Geo. 5. c. lxxii	4 August 1922
An Act to authorise the Corporation of Doncaster to provide and run omnibuses within and outside the borough to confer upon the Corporation further powers with reference to their water and electricity undertakings to make better provision for the health local government and finance of the borough and for other purposes.
Durham County Water Board Act 1922	12 & 13 Geo. 5. c. lxxiii	4 August 1922
An Act to empower the Durham County Water Board to construct waterworks for the supply of water for their own undertaking and that of the Sunderland and South Shields Water Company to increase the charges for the supply of water and for other purposes.
Ayr Burgh (Electricity) Act 1922 (repealed)	12 & 13 Geo. 5. c. lxxiv	4 August 1922
An Act to authorise the provost magistrates and councillors of the burgh of Ayr to construct a generating station and works and utilise the waters of Loch Doon for generating electricity to make further provision with regard to their electricity undertaking and for other purposes. (Repealed by South of Scotland Electricity Order Confirmation Act 1956 (4 & 5 Eliz. 2. c. xciv))
Bristol Tramways Act 1922	12 & 13 Geo. 5. c. lxxv	4 August 1922
An Act to extend the times for the construction of certain tramways and the acquisition of certain lands by the Bristol Tramways and Carriage Company Limited to revive and extend the powers for the acquisition by the Company of lands forming part of their electricity generating station at Bristol and for other purposes.
Birmingham Corporation Act 1922	12 & 13 Geo. 5. c. lxxvi	4 August 1922
An Act to empower the lord mayor aldermen and citizens of the city of Birmingham to construct additional waterworks and to provide and run trolley vehicles and to make further provision in regard to their several undertakings and to the health local government and improvement of the city and for other purposes.
North Metropolitan Electric Power Supply Act 1922 (repealed)	12 & 13 Geo. 5. c. lxxvii	4 August 1922
An Act to confer further powers upon the North Metropolitan Electric Supply Company to provide for the vesting in the said Company of the undertakings of the North Metropolitan Electrical Power Distribution Company Limited and the dissolution of that company and for other purposes. (Repealed by North Metropolitan Electric Power Supply (Consolidation) Act 1928 (18 & 19 Geo. 5. c. cxviii))
Exeter Corporation Act 1922 (repealed)	12 & 13 Geo. 5. c. lxxviii	4 August 1922
An Act to authorise the appropriation and use of the Higher Market in the city of Exeter to and for purposes other than market purposes to confer further powers upon the mayor aldermen and citizens of the said city and to make provision with respect to the sums charged on the revenue of their markets and for other purposes. (Repealed by Exeter City Council Act 1987 (c. xi))
Grampian Electricity Supply Act 1922	12 & 13 Geo. 5. c. lxxix	4 August 1922
An Act for incorporating and conferring powers upon the Grampian Electricity Supply Company and for other purposes.
London County Council (Tramways and Improvements) Act 1922	12 & 13 Geo. 5. c. lxxx	4 August 1922
An Act to empower the London County Council to construct and work new tramways to alter and reconstruct an existing tramway and to make street improvements and other works and for other purposes.
Neath Corporation Act 1922	12 & 13 Geo. 5. c. lxxxi	4 August 1922
An Act to extend the boundaries of the borough of Neath to confer upon the Corporation of the borough further powers with respect to their water gas electricity markets and slaughter-houses undertakings to make better provision for the health local government and finance of the borough and for other purposes.
South Staffordshire Waterworks Act 1922	12 & 13 Geo. 5. c. lxxxii	4 August 1922
An Act for authorising the South Staffordshire Waterworks Company to construct new works and to raise additional capital for increasing the charges of the Company and for other purposes.
Chester Gas Act 1922	12 & 13 Geo. 5. c. lxxxiii	4 August 1922
An Act to make new provisions as to the charges to be made by the Chester United Gas Company and as to the application of the profits of the Company and for other purposes.
Wear Navigation and Sunderland Dock (Consolidation and Amendment) Act 1922	12 & 13 Geo. 5. c. lxxxiv	4 August 1922
An Act to make new provisions as to the charges to be made by the Chester United Gas Company and as to the application of the profits of the Company and for other purposes.
Ramsgate Corporation Act 1922 (repealed)	12 & 13 Geo. 5. c. lxxxv	4 August 1922
An Act to confer further powers upon the mayor aldermen and burgesses-of the borough of Ramsgate with regard to the purchase of lands the provision of concert halls and entertainments and baths to make further provision with regard to the health improvement and good government of the borough water supply gas supply the consolidation of parishes the consolidation of rates the audit of accounts and for other purposes. (Repealed by County of Kent Act 1981 (c. xviii))
Kingston-upon-Hull Corporation Act 1922	12 & 13 Geo. 5. c. lxxxvi	4 August 1922
An Act to alter the style and title of the Corporation of the city of Kingston upon Hull and to confer further powers upon the Corporation of that city in relation to their water undertaking and the local government and improvement of the city and for other purposes.
Black Country Tramways and Light Railway Act 1922	12 & 13 Geo. 5. c. lxxxvii	4 August 1922
An Act to make provisions with reference to the undertakings of the Birmingham District Power and Traction Company Limited the Dudley Stourbridge and District Electric Traction Company Limited the South Staffordshire Tramways Company the South Staffordshire Tramways (Lessee) Company Limited and the Wolverhampton District Electric Tramways Limited to confer powers upon those Companies and for other purposes.
Cambridge Corporation Act 1922 (repealed)	12 & 13 Geo. 5. c. lxxxviii	4 August 1922
An Act to empower the mayor aldermen and burgesses of the borough of Cambridge to construct a street improvement to provide for the extinction of the Lammas rights in respect of certain lands in the borough to confer further powers upon the Corporation with regard to commons and open spaces and the health local government and improvement of the borough to amalgamate the parishes and consolidate the rates of the borough and for other purposes. (Repealed by Cambridge City Council Act 1985 (c. xl))
Saint Marylebone Borough Council (Superannuation) Act 1922 (repealed)	12 & 13 Geo. 5. c. lxxxix	4 August 1922
An Act to make further provision with respect to the granting of superannuation allowances to the officers and servants of the council of the metropolitan borough of Saint Marylebone to amend the Saint Marylebone Borough Council (Superannuation) Act 1908 (Note: Saint Marylebone Borough Council (Superannuation) Act 1908 (8 Edw. 7. c. xxi)) and for other purposes. (Repealed by Local Law (Greater London Council and Inner London Boroughs) Order 1965 (SI 1965/540))
Shoreditch and other Metropolitan Borough Councils (Superannuation) Act 1922 (repealed)	12 & 13 Geo. 5. c. xc	4 August 1922
An Act to authorise the metropolitan borough councils of Shoreditch Bermondsey Finsbury Greenwich Hammersmith Southwark and Stoke Newington to establish Superannuation Funds and for other purposes. (Repealed by Local Law (Greater London Council and Inner London Boroughs) Order 1965 (SI 1965/540))
Lambeth Borough Council (Superannuation) Act 1922	12 & 13 Geo. 5. c. xci	4 August 1922
An Act to provide for the granting of superannuation allowances to the officers and servants of the mayor aldermen and councillors of the metropolitan borough of Lambeth and for other purposes.
Staffordshire Asylums Act 1922	12 & 13 Geo. 5. c. xcii	4 August 1922
An Act to constitute a lunatic asylums board for the county of Stafford to transfer the existing county lunatic asylums to such Board and for other purposes.
Bolton Corporation Act 1922	12 & 13 Geo. 5. c. xciii	4 August 1922
An Act to empower the mayor aldermen and burgesses of the county borough of Bolton to construct additional waterworks and tramways and to run services of omnibuses and to execute street improvements to make further provision in regard to their water tramway electricity and market undertakings to make further provision for the improvement health and good government of the borough and for other purposes.
Ministry of Health Provisional Order Confirmation (No. 4) Act 1922 (repealed)	12 & 13 Geo. 5. c. xciv	4 August 1922
An Act to confirm a Provisional Order of the Minister of Health relating to the Counties of Carnarvon and Denbigh. (Repealed by Clwyd County Council Act 1985 (c. xliv))
	Counties of Carnarvon and Denbigh (Llysfaen) Order 1922 Provisional Order made in pursuance of the Local Government Act 1888 for an alteration of the Boundary of Counties.	
Ministry of Health Provisional Orders Confirmation (No. 7) Act 1922	12 & 13 Geo. 5. c. xcv	4 August 1922
An Act to confirm certain Provisional Orders of the Minister of Health relating to Ashton-under-Lyne Greenford Ilfracombe Margate and New Mills.
	Ashton-under-Lyne Order 1922 Provisional Order to enable the Council of the Borough of Ashton-under-Lyne to put in force the Compulsory Clauses of the Lands Clauses Acts.	
	Greenford Order 1922 Provisional Order to enable the Urban District Council of Greenford to put in force the Compulsory Clauses of the Lands Clauses Acts.	
	Ilfracombe Order 1922 Provisional Order for altering and amending a Local Act (Note: Ilfracombe Improvement Act 1900 (63 & 64 Vict. c. ccxiii)) and a Confirming Act. (Note: Ministry of Health Provisional Orders Confirmation (No. 3) Act 1921 (11 & 12 Geo. 5. c. xix))	
	Margate Order 1922 Provisional Order for repealing altering and amending certain Local Acts and Confirming Acts.	
	New Mills Order 1922 Provisional Order for altering the New Mills Urban District Council Act 1906. (Note: New Mills Urban District Council Act 1906 (6 Edw. 7. c. xxxv))	
Ministry of Health Provisional Orders Confirmation (No. 8) Act 1922	12 & 13 Geo. 5. c. xcvi	4 August 1922
An Act to confirm certain Provisional Orders of the Minister of Health relating to Cambridge Ilkley North Darley Port Talbot and Stockton-on-Tees.
	Cambridge Order 1922 Provisional Order to enable the Local Authority of the Borough of Cambridge to put in force the Compulsory Clauses of the Lands Clauses Acts.	
	Ilkley Order 1922 Provisional Order for altering and amending the Ilkley Local Board Act 1893. (Note: Ilkley Local Board Act 1893 (56 & 57 Vict. c. xlvii))	
	North Darley Order 1922 Provisional Order for partially repealing altering and amending the Darley Dale Water Act 1902. (Note: Darley Dale Water Act 1902 (2 Edw. 7. c. xi))	
	Port Talbot Order 1922 Provisional Order for altering and amending the Aberavon Market Act 1848. (Note: Aberavon Market Act 1848 (11 & 12 Vict. c. cxxxviii))	
	Stockton-on-Tees Order 1922 Provisional Order for partially repealing altering and amending the Stockton-on-Tees Extension and Improvement Act 1869 (Note: Stockton-on-Tees Extension and Improvement Act 1869 (32 & 33 Vict. c. lxxiv)) the Stockton-on-Tees Market Act 1876 (Note: Stockton-on-Tees Market Act 1876 (39 & 40 Vict. c. cxviii)) and the Stockton-on-Tees (Quay and Markets) Act 1878. (Note: Stockton-on-Tees (Quay and Markets) Act 1878 (41 & 42 Vict. c. cxciv))	
Ministry of Health Provisional Orders Confirmation (No. 9) Act 1922	12 & 13 Geo. 5. c. xcvii	4 August 1922
An Act to confirm certain Provisional Orders of the Minister of Health relating to Bradford Leek New Quay Runcorn Weymouth and Melcombe Regis and Whitstable.
	Bradford Order 1922 Provisional Order for altering certain Local Acts and Confirming Acts.	
	Leek Order 1922 Provisional Order for altering the Leek Improvement Act 1855. (Note: Leek Improvement Act 1855 (18 & 19 Vict. c. cxxxii))	
	New Quay Order 1922 Provisional Order to enable the Urban District Council of New Quay to put in force the Compulsory Clauses of the Lands Clauses Acts.	
	Runcorn Order 1922 Provisional Order for altering the Runcorn Weston and Halton Waterworks Act 1865 (Note: Runcorn, Weston and Halton Waterworks Act 1865 (28 & 29 Vict. c. xlvii)) and the Runcorn Commissioners Act 1893. (Note: Runcorn Commissioners Act 1893 (56 & 57 Vict. c. clvi))	
	Weymouth and Melcombe Regis (No. 2) Order 1922 Provisional Order for altering or amending the Weymouth and Melcombe Regis Corporation Act 1887. (Note: Weymouth and Melcombe Regis Corporation Act 1887 (50 & 51 Vict. c. cliii))	
	Whitstable Order 1922 Provisional Order for altering the Whitstable Water and Improvement Act 1902. (Note: Whitstable Water and Improvement Act 1902 (2 Edw. 7. c. ccxxxix))	
Ministry of Health Provisional Orders Confirmation (No. 10) Act 1922	12 & 13 Geo. 5. c. xcviii	4 August 1922
An Act to confirm certain Provisional Orders of the Minister of Health relating to Chester Orsett Joint Hospital Board Wallasey and Wolverhampton.
	Chester Order 1922 Provisional Order for altering the Chester Improvement Act 1884. (Note: Chester Improvement Act 1884 (47 & 48 Vict. c. ccxxxix))	
	Orsett Joint Hospital Order 1922 Provisional Order for altering the Local Government Board's Provisional Orders Confirmation (No. 8) Act, 1901. (Note: Local Government Board's Provisional Orders Confirmation (No. 8) Act 1901 (1 Edw. 7. c. cxlix))	
	Wallasey Order 1922 Provisional Order for altering the Wallasey Improvement Act 1872. (Note: Wallasey Improvement Act 1872 (35 & 36 Vict. c. cxxv))	
	Wolverhampton (Rates) Order 1922 Provisional Order for partially repealing altering and amending certain Local Acts and Confirming Acts.	
Pilotage Orders Confirmation (No. 4) Act 1922 (repealed)	12 & 13 Geo. 5. c. xcix	4 August 1922
An Act to confirm certain Pilotage Orders made by the Board of Trade under the Pilotage Act 1913 relating to pilotage in the Pilotage Districts of the Forth (Trinity House of Leith) Borrowstounness Burntisland Charlestown Grangemouth Kirkcaldy Leith and Methil. (Repealed by Forth Pilotage Order 1947 (SR&O 1947/1938))
	Forth Pilotage Order 1922 The Forth Pilotage Order.	
	Borrowstounness Pilotage Order 1922 Borrowstounness Pilotage Order.	
	Burntisland Pilotage Order 1922 Burntisland Pilotage Order.	
	Charlestown Pilotage Order 1922 Charlestown Pilotage Order.	
	Grangemouth Pilotage Order 1922 Grangemouth Pilotage Order.	
	Kirkcaldy Pilotage Order 1922 Kirkcaldy Pilotage Order.	
	Leith Pilotage Order 1922 Leith Pilotage Order.	
	Methil Pilotage Order 1922 Methil Pilotage Order.	
Provisional Order (Marriages) Confirmation (No. 2) Act 1922 (repealed)	12 & 13 Geo. 5. c. c	4 August 1922
An Act to confirm a Provisional Order made by one of His Majesty's Principal Secretaries of State under the Provisional Order (Marriages) Act 1905. (Repealed by Statute Law (Repeals) Act 1977 (c. 18))
	St. Alphonsus Roman Catholic Chapel Middlesbrough Order.	
Grangemouth Burgh Extension Order Confirmation Act 1922	12 & 13 Geo. 5. c. ci	4 August 1922
An Act to confirm a Provisional Order under the Private Legislation Procedure (Scotland) Act 1899 relating to Grangemouth Burgh Extension.
	Grangemouth Burgh Extension Order 1922 Provisional Order to extend the boundaries of the Burgh of Grangemouth and for other purposes.	
Greenock Port and Harbours Order Confirmation Act 1922	12 & 13 Geo. 5. c. cii	4 August 1922
An Act to confirm a Provisional Order under the Private Legislation Procedure (Scotland) Act 1899 relating to Greenock Port and Harbours.
	Greenock Port and Harbours Order 1922 Provisional Order to repeal the existing rates and charges authorised to be levied at the port and harbours of Greenock and to authorise the Trustees of the said port and harbours to levy new and additional rates and charges in lieu thereof and for other purposes.	
Glasgow and Rutherglen Corporations Order Confirmation Act 1922	12 & 13 Geo. 5. c. ciii	4 August 1922
An Act to confirm a Provisional Order under the Private Legislation Procedure (Scotland) Act 1899 relating to Glasgow and Rutherglen Corporations.
	Glasgow and Rutherglen Corporations Order 1922 Provisional Order to repeal section 89 of the Roads and Bridges (Scotland) Act 1878 (Note: Roads and Bridges (Scotland) Act 1878 (41 & 42 Vict. c. 51)) and for other purposes.	
Louth Baptist and Congregational Chapels Scheme Confirmation Act 1922	12 & 13 Geo. 5. c. civ	4 August 1922
An Act to confirm a Scheme of the Charity Commissioners for the application or management of the Charities consisting of a Baptist Chapel and Proceeds of Sale of a former Congregational Chapel in the parish of Louth in the county of Lincoln.
	Scheme for the Application or Management of the Following Charities in the Parish of Louth in the County of Lincoln:—: 1. The Charity consisting of the Baptist Chapel in Eastgate comprised in an indenture dated 26th February 1873; 2. The Charity consisting of the Proceeds of Sale of the Congregational Chapel comprised in an indenture dated 12th February 1821 and regulated by a scheme of the Charity Commissioners of the 3rd June 1921 including the subsidiary charity of Stratton Andrews Hillier.	
Norfolk Fisheries Provisional Order Confirmation Act 1922	12 & 13 Geo. 5. c. cv	4 August 1922
An Act to confirm a Provisional Order under the Salmon and Freshwater Fisheries Act 1907 (Note: Salmon and Freshwater Fisheries Act 1907 (7 Edw. 7. c. 15)) extending and modifying the Norfolk Fisheries Provisional Order 1912.
	Norfolk Fisheries Provisional Order 1922 Norfolk Fisheries Provisional Order 1922.	
Taw and Torridge Fisheries Provisional Order Confirmation Act 1922	12 & 13 Geo. 5. c. cvi	4 August 1922
An Act to confirm a Provisional Order under the Salmon and Freshwater Fisheries Act 1907 relating to the Rivers Taw and Torridge and other waters.
	Taw and Torridge Fisheries Provisional Order 1922 Taw and Torridge Fisheries Provisional Order 1922.	
Towy Fisheries Provisional Order Confirmation Act 1922	12 & 13 Geo. 5. c. cvii	4 August 1922
An Act to confirm a Provisional Order under the Salmon and Freshwater Fisheries Act 1907 relating to the River Towy and other waters.
	River Towy Fisheries Provisional Order 1922 River Towy Fisheries Provisional Order 1922.	
Hampshire Rivers Fisheries Provisional Order Confirmation Act 1922	12 & 13 Geo. 5. c. cviii	4 August 1922
An Act to confirm a Provisional Order under the Salmon and Freshwater Fisheries Act 1907 relating to certain Rivers in the Administrative Counties of Dorset Wilts and Southampton and other waters.
	Hampshire Rivers Fisheries Provisional Order 1922 Hampshire Rivers Fisheries Provisional Order 1922.	
Land Drainage Provisional Order Confirmation (No. 2) Act 1922	12 & 13 Geo. 5. c. cix	4 August 1922
An Act to confirm a Provisional Order under the Land Drainage Act 1918 relating to a Drainage District in the administrative counties of the Parts of Holland the Parts of Kesteven and the Soke of Peterborough.
	Welland Drainage Order 1922 Welland Drainage District.	

=== Private and personal acts ===
Short title	Citation	Royal assent
Long title
Clare College Cambridge (Blythe's Benefaction) Act 1922	12 & 13 Geo. 5. c. 1 Pr.	4 August 1922
An Act for the better regulation of Doctor Blythe's Benefaction to Clare College Cambridge.
Fife Trust Estate Act 1922	12 & 13 Geo. 5. c. 2 Pr.	4 August 1922
An Act to vary the Trusts and Powers of two several Indentures both dates the twenty-eighth day of April one thousand nine hundred and thirteen and executed on the marriage of Ronald D'Arcy Fife with Margaret Albert Rutson (now Margaret Albert Fife his Wife).
Babington's Divorce Act 1922 (Note: This act was not printed by the King's Printer)	12 & 13 Geo. 5. c. 3 Pr.	31 May 1922
An Act to dissolve the marriage of Hume Babington, of Saint Kevin's, Victoria Park, Buncrana, in the county of Donegal, with Dorothy Marie Babington, his now wife, and to enable him to marry again, and for other purposes.
Maguire's Divorce Act 1922	12 & 13 Geo. 5. c. 4 Pr.	31 May 1922
An Act to dissolve the Marriage of Alice Mary Maguire with Leonard Cornwall Maguire, her now husband, and to enable her to marry again, and for other purposes.
Crofts's Divorce Act 1922	12 & 13 Geo. 5. c. 5 Pr.	31 May 1922
An Act to dissolve the marriage of Violet Emily Crofts, of Aclare Rectory, Aclare, in the county of Sligo, in Ireland, with Christopher Nason Crofts, her present husband, and to enable her to marry again, and for other purposes.
Morton's Divorce Act 1922 (Note: This was the last un-printed private act.)	12 & 13 Geo. 5. c. 6 Pr.	31 May 1922
An Act to dissolve the marriage of Robert Morton, junior, with Alice Mary Georgina Morton, his now wife and to enable him to marry again, and for other purposes

== 13 Geo. 5 Sess. 2 ==
The first session of the 32nd Parliament of the United Kingdom, which met from 20 November 1922 until 15 December 1922.

This was the first session held with the current make-up of the United Kingdom (England, Scotland, Wales and Northern Ireland).

No private acts were passed in this session.

This session was also traditionally cited as 13 G. 5 Sess. 2.

=== Public general acts ===
Short title	Citation	Royal assent
Long title
Irish Free State Constitution Act 1922 (Session 2) (repealed)	13 Geo. 5. Sess. 2. c. 1	5 December 1922
An Act to provide for the Constitution of the Irish Free State. (Repealed for the United Kingdom by Statute Law Revision Act 1953 (2 & 3 Eliz. 2. c. 5) and Statute Law (Repeals) Act 1989 (c. 43) and for the Republic of Ireland by Statute Law Revision Act 2007 (No. 28))
Irish Free State (Consequential Provisions) Act 1922 (Session 2)	13 Geo. 5. Sess. 2. c. 2	5 December 1922
An Act to make such provisions as are consequential on or incidental to the establishment of the Irish Free State.
Appropriation Act 1922 (Session 2) (repealed)	13 Geo. 5. Sess. 2. c. 3	15 December 1922
An Act to apply a sum out of the Consolidated Fund to the service of the year ending on the thirty-first day of March, one thousand nine hundred and twenty-three, and to appropriate the Supplies granted in this Session of Parliament. (Repealed by Statute Law Revision Act 1950 (14 Geo. 6. c. 6))
Trade Facilities and Loans Guarantee Act 1922 (Session 2) (repealed)	13 Geo. 5. Sess. 2. c. 4	15 December 1922
An Act to amend section one of the Trade Facilities Act, 1921, (Note: Trade Facilities Act 1921 (11 & 12 Geo. 5. c. 65)) and the Overseas Trade Acts, 1920 (Note: Overseas Trade (Credits and Insurance) Act 1920 (10 & 11 Geo. 5. c. 29)) and 1921, (Note: Overseas Trade (Credits and Insurance) Amendment Act 1921 (11 & 12 Geo. 5. c. 26)) and to authorise the Treasury to guarantee certain loans to be raised by the Government of the Federal Republic of Austria and the Government of the Soudan respectively. (Repealed by Statute Law (Repeals) Act 1977 (c. 18))
Importation of Animals Act 1922 (Session 2) (repealed)	13 Geo. 5. Sess. 2. c. 5	15 December 1922
An Act to amend the law with respect to the landing of imported animals in Great Britain and matters connected therewith. (Repealed by Diseases of Animals Act 1950 (14 Geo. 6. c. 36))

=== Local acts ===
Short title	Citation	Royal assent
Long title
Dundee High School Order Confirmation Act 1922	13 Geo. 5. Sess. 2. c. i	15 December 1922
An Act to confirm a Provisional Order under the Private Legislation Procedure (Scotland) Act 1899 (Note: Private Legislation Procedure (Scotland) Act 1899 (62 & 63 Vict. c. 47)) relating to Dundee High School.
	Dundee High School Order 1922 Provisional Order to authorise alterations in the scheme of representation on the Directorate of the Corporation of the High School of Dundee to provide for the future administration of the High School and for other purposes.	
Glasgow (Tramways, &c.) Order Confirmation Act 1922 (repealed)	13 Geo. 5. Sess. 2. c. ii	15 December 1922
An Act to confirm a Provisional Order under the Private Legislation Procedure (Scotland) Act 1899 relating to Glasgow (Tramways, &c.). (Repealed by Glasgow Corporation Consolidation (Water, Transport and Markets) Order Confirmation Act 1964 (c. xliii))
	Glasgow (Tramways, &c.) Order 1922 Provisional Order to authorise the Corporation of the City of Glasgow to acquire and work the tramway undertaking of the Airdrie and Coatbridge Tramways Trustees and for other purposes.	
Scottish Widows' Fund and Life Assurance Society's Order Confirmation Act 1922 (repealed)	13 Geo. 5. Sess. 2. c. iii	15 December 1922
An Act to confirm a Provisional Order under the Private Legislation Procedure (Scotland) Act 1899 relating to the Scottish Widows' Fund and Life Assurance Society. (Repealed by Scottish Widows' Fund and Life Assurance Society's Act 1926 (16 & 17 Geo. 5. c. lxxviii))
	Scottish Widows' Fund and Life Assurance Society's Order 1922 Provisional Order to confer further powers on the Scottish Widow's Fund and Life Assurance Society and to amend the Acts relating to the Society and for other purposes.	
Edinburgh Corporation Order Confirmation Act 1922 (repealed)	13 Geo. 5. Sess. 2. c. iv	15 December 1922
An Act to confirm a Provisional Order under the Private Legislation Procedure (Scotland) Act 1899 relating to Edinburgh Corporation. (Repealed by Edinburgh Corporation Order Confirmation Act 1967 (c. v))
	Edinburgh Corporation Order 1922 Provisional Order to authorise the Corporation of the City and Royal Burgh of Edinburgh to make and maintain tramways to construct works to acquire lands for improvements and other purposes to reconstitute the superannuation scheme of the Corporation to borrow money to amend the Edinburgh Municipal and Police Acts and for other purposes.	
East Lothian (Western District) Water Order Confirmation Act 1922	13 Geo. 5. Sess. 2. c. v	15 December 1922
An Act to confirm a Provisional Order under the Private Legislation Procedure (Scotland) Act 1899 relating to East Lothian (Western District) Water.
	East Lothian (Western District) Water Order 1922 Provisional Order to constitute and incorporate a Board for the supply of water to the western district of the county of East Lothian to transfer to the Board the water undertakings of the county council and the Western District Committee of the county of East Lothian and the undertakings of the burghs of Prestonpans and Cockenzie and Port Seton to authorise the Board to construct additional waterworks to confer further powers on the Board and for other purposes.	

== See also ==
- List of acts of the Parliament of the United Kingdom
