= Irish Free State Constitution Act 1922 =

UK act of Parliament to recognise in UK law the 1922 Irish Free State constitution

Irish Free State Constitution Act 1922 (Session 2) (Note: Section 5. Although the words "(Session 2)" in the title are generally omitted when referring to it.)
- Act of Parliament
- Parliament of the United Kingdom
- Long title: An Act to provide for the Constitution of the Irish Free State.
- Citation: 13 Geo. 5 Sess. 2. c. 1
- Territorial extent: United Kingdom

Dates
- Royal assent: 5 December 1922
- Commencement: 6 December 1922 (Note: The Acts of Parliament (Commencement) Act 1793.)
- Repealed: United Kingdom: 16 November 1989; Republic of Ireland: 8 May 2007

Other legislation
- Amended by: Statute Law Revision Act 1953
- Repealed by: United Kingdom: Statute Law (Repeals) Act 1989; Republic of Ireland: Statute Law Revision Act 2007
- Relates to: Irish Free State (Agreement) Act 1922; Ireland (Confirmation of Agreement) Act 1925; Irish Free State (Confirmation of Agreement) Act 1929

Status: Repealed

History of passage through Parliament

Text of statute as originally enacted

The Irish Free State Constitution Act 1922 (Session 2) (13 Geo. 5 Sess. 2. c. 1) was an act of the Parliament of the United Kingdom, passed in 1922 to enact in UK law the Constitution of the Irish Free State, and to ratify the 1921 Anglo-Irish Treaty formally.

== Provisions ==
As originally enacted, the Irish Free State Constitution Act 1922 consisted of a preamble, five sections (three of which were very brief), and a schedule. The schedule was the text of the Constitution of the Irish Free State (Saorstát Éireann) Act 1922, which had been passed in Ireland by the 3rd Dáil sitting as a constituent assembly and provisional parliament for the nascent Free State. This Irish act itself had two schedules, the first being the actual text of the Constitution, and the second the text of the 1921 Treaty (formally, the Articles of Agreement for a treaty between Great Britain and Ireland). The UK act's preamble quotes section 2 of the Irish act:

if any provision of the said Constitution or of any amendment thereof or of any law made there under is in any respect repugnant to any of the provisions of the Scheduled Treaty [the Anglo-Irish Treaty], it shall, to the extent only of such repugnancy be absolutely void and inoperative and the Parliament and the Executive Council of the Irish Free State shall respectively pass such further legislation and do such other things as may be necessary to implement the Scheduled Treaty.

Section 1
declared the scheduled Constitution would come into effect upon a royal proclamation no later than 6 December 1922.

Section 2
made transitory provisions regarding taxation liabilities.

Section 3
empowered the Free State parliament to adopt legislation applied to other dominions of the British Empire.

Section 4
was a "saver" clause asserting that the UK Parliament retained the power to pass laws for Ireland on the same basis as for other dominions.

Section 5
assigned the short title and specified that the Anglo-Irish Treaty had been ratified.

Parliament had implicitly accepted the treaty by votes on the King's Speech in December 1921, and most of its provisions had been effected in March 1922 by the Irish Free State (Agreement) Act 1922 (12 & 13 Geo. 5. c. 4) . However, neither of these events was held to have formally ratified the treaty. This was because Article 12 of the treaty accorded to Northern Ireland the right to secede from the new Free State and rejoin the United Kingdom, giving its parliament a month in which to decide. This so-called Ulster Month would begin as soon as the treaty had been ratified, and some felt that the opt-out should not be exercised until after the Free State had come into being. Section 5 of the Irish Free State Constitution Act therefore declared the Act to be the ratification of the treaty for the purposes of the Ulster Month.

== Enactment ==
The Irish Act had been approved by the Irish constituent assembly on 25 October 1922. The bill for the UK Act was introduced by the Prime Minister Bonar Law into the Parliament of the United Kingdom in November 1922. The bill's third reading in the House of Commons was on 30 November.

The New York Times reported on the passing of the act on 5 December 1922 as follows:

At 6 o’clock this evening an event of great historic interest and of international importance took place in the House of Lords. A few minutes before that hour the Irish Free State Constitution bills had passed the final stage in the House of Commons by formal acceptance of the Lords’ amendments. It was brought back, beribboned and sealed, by the Clerk of the Commons himself, and handed to the Clerk of the Parliament to receive the royal assent. This was conferred, as usual, by the Royal Commission, the members of which were Lord Cave, Lord Novar and Lord Somerleyton … King George will make a special journey from Sandringham tomorrow to hold a privy council in Buckingham Palace, at which he will sign a proclamation declaring the adoption of the Irish Constitution by the British and Irish Parliaments. The Constitution will come into operation immediately on the issue of the proclamation.

The New York Times also reported that in Parliament a group of Communists singing "The Red Flag" caused a minor disturbance as the formalities relating to the Act's passage were underway.

== Northern Ireland secedes from the Irish Free State ==
On 7 December 1922, the day after the establishment of the Irish Free State, the Parliament of Northern Ireland addressed the King requesting its secession from Irish Free State. The address was unanimous, with the abstentionist Nationalist and Sinn Féin members absent. The King replied shortly thereafter to say that he had caused his Ministers and the Government of the Irish Free State to be informed that Northern Ireland was to do so.

== Position in Irish law ==
After the Statute of Westminster 1931 (22 & 23 Geo. 5. c. 4), the UK government recognised the right of the Irish government to amend or repeal the UK act, but in fact the Irish government did not do so until it was formally repealed as spent by the Statute Law Revision Act 2007. The Irish government amended the Irish act in 1933, and the 1937 constitution repealed the entire Free State constitution. The UK Judicial Committee of the Privy Council ruled in 1935 that the 1933 act had implicitly amended the UK act with respect to the jurisdiction of the Free State. The Irish Supreme Court has taken the view that the Free State constitution was enacted by the Irish act, not by the subsequent UK act. This reflects the view of popular sovereignty rather than parliamentary sovereignty, with the constitution's legitimacy ultimately springing from the 1922 Irish election.

The following provisions of the act were repealed by section 1 of, and the first schedule to, the Statute Law Revision Act 1953 (2 & 3 Eliz. 2. c. 5), which came into force on 18 December 1953.

- In the preamble the words from " And whereas by Article seventy-four " to " rest of the United Kingdom ".

In section 1, the words from " but His Majesty may " to the end of the section.

- Section 2.
- Section 4.

The whole act of both 1922 acts were repealed for the United Kingdom by section 1(1) of, and part III of schedule 1 to, the Statute Law (Repeals) Act 1989, which came into force on 16 November 1989.

The whole of both 1922 acts were repealed for the Republic of Ireland by sections 2(1) and 3(1) of, and part 4 of schedule 2 to, the Statute Law Revision Act 2007, which came into force on 8 May 2007.

== Bibliography ==
- HC Deb vol 159: Ordered 27 Nov 1922 cc294-7; Second Reading 27 Nov 1922 cc327-87; Committee 28 Nov 1922 cc537-67; Third Reading 29 Nov 1922 cc741-74; from Lords 4 Dec 1922 c1210
- HL Deb vol 52: First Reading 29 Nov c105; Second Reading 30 Nov 1922 cc108-72; Committee 1 Dec 1922 cc173-88; Third Reading 4 Dec 1922 cc211-36
