= Infanticide Act =

English laws on the killing of an infant by its mother

The Infanticide Act is the name of two 20th-century acts in English law that started treating the killing of an infant child by its mother during the early months of life as a lesser crime than murder.

== England and Wales ==
Infanticide Act 1922 (Note: Section 2(1).)
- Act of Parliament
- Parliament of the United Kingdom
- Long title: An Act to provide that a woman who wilfully causes the death of her newly-born child may, under certain conditions, be convicted of infanticide.
- Citation: 12 & 13 Geo. 5. c. 18
- Territorial extent: England and Wales; Northern Ireland; (Note: Section 2(1).)

Dates
- Royal assent: 20 July 1922
- Commencement: 20 July 1922 (Note: The Acts of Parliament (Commencement) Act 1793.)
- Repealed: England and Wales: 23 June 1938; Northern Ireland: 2 May 1939
Other legislation
Repealed by	England and Wales: Infanticide Act 1938; Northern Ireland: Infanticide Act (Northern Ireland) 1939

Status: Repealed

Text of statute as originally enacted

The Infanticide Act 1922 (12 & 13 Geo. 5. c. 18) effectively abolished the death penalty for a woman who deliberately killed her newborn child, while the balance of her mind was disturbed as a result of giving birth, by providing a partial defence to murder. The sentence that applies (as in other partial defences to murder) is the same as that for manslaughter. This act was repealed by section 2(3) of the Infanticide Act 1938.

The Infanticide Act 1938 (1 & 2 Geo. 6. c. 36) extended this defence to cases where "at the time of the act or omission the balance of her mind was disturbed by reason of her not having fully recovered from the effect of giving birth to the child or by reason of the effect of lactation consequent upon the birth of the child."

Before the partial murder defence of diminished responsibility became part of English law in the Homicide Act 1957, and other than referral for possible insanity, this provided the main means of lenient sentencing for a mother found guilty of deliberate killing of her infant. Such women would otherwise face a mandatory life sentence or death sentence for murder.

In the 21st century, it has become common for a severely post-natally depressed mother who kills her infant child to not receive a prison sentence, except in exceptional circumstances. As of 2019, where a less extreme or no condition is suffered by the mother, then causing or allowing a child under 15 to die (under the Domestic Violence, Crime and Victims Act 2004, s.5) carries an effective sentence recommendation of 1 to 14 years' custody, unless the seven influential steps of sentencing determine otherwise. Where an offender's responsibility is substantially reduced by mental disorder, learning disability or lack of maturity, the lowest of three culpabilities applies, namely, "lesser culpability", and the starting point is 2 years in custody, with a possible range of 1 to 4 years' custody.

In a report, the terms of which were agreed on 1 November 2006, the Law Commission recognised the difficulties facing the court when a defendant is in denial and unwilling to submit to psychiatric examination, as she perceives the purpose of such examination as an attempt to prove her guilt. In such cases, the mother is unlikely to have any other defence and is therefore more likely to be convicted of murder or causing a child to die.

== Northern Ireland ==
The Infanticide Act (Northern Ireland) 1939 makes similar arrangements for Northern Ireland.

== Canada ==
The English Infanticide Acts also formed the basis for similar legislation in Canadian criminal law, which was enacted via an amendment to the Criminal Code in 1948. It is still in the Criminal Code and has not been updated since its enactment in 1948. It is an indictable offence, and carries a penalty of imprisonment not exceeding five years.

== See also ==
- List of short titles
