= Infanticide Act 1938 =

Act of the Parliament of the United Kingdom

Infanticide Act 1938 (Note: Section 2(1).)
- Act of Parliament
- Parliament of the United Kingdom
- Long title: An Act to repeal and re-enact with modifications the provisions of the Infanticide Act, 1922.
- Citation: 1 & 2 Geo. 6. c. 36
- Territorial extent: England and Wales (Note: Section 2(2).)

Dates
- Royal assent: 23 June 1938
- Commencement: 23 June 1938 (Note: The Acts of Parliament (Commencement) Act 1793.)
Other legislation
Repeals/revokes	Infanticide Act 1922
Amended by	Statute Law Revision Act 1950; Criminal Law Act 1967; Coroners and Justice Act 2009
Relates to	Infanticide Act (Northern Ireland) 1939

Status: Amended

Text of statute as originally enacted

Revised text of statute as amended

Text of the Infanticide Act 1938 as in force today (including any amendments) within the United Kingdom, from legislation.gov.uk.

The Infanticide Act 1938 (1 & 2 Geo. 6. c. 36) is an act of the Parliament of the United Kingdom that created the offence of infanticide for England and Wales.

== Provisions ==
=== Section 1 - Offence of infanticide ===
Sections 1(1) to (3) of the act now read:

- (1) Where a woman by any wilful act or omission causes the death of her child being a child under the age of twelve months, but at the time of the act or omission the balance of her mind was disturbed by reason of her not having fully recovered from the effect of giving birth to the child or by reason of the effect of lactation consequent upon the birth of the child, then, [if] the circumstances were such that but for this Act the offence would have amounted to murder [or manslaughter], she shall be guilty of felony, to wit of infanticide, and may for such offence be dealt with and punished as if she had been guilty of the offence of manslaughter of the child.
- (2) Where upon the trial of a woman for the murder of her child, being a child under the age of twelve months, the jury are of opinion that she by any wilful act or omission caused its death, but that at the time of the act or omission the balance of her mind was disturbed by reason of her not having fully recovered from the effect of giving birth to the child or by reason of the effect of lactation consequent upon the birth of the child, then the jury may, [if] the circumstances were such that but for the provisions of this Act they might have returned a verdict of murder [or manslaughter], return in lieu thereof a verdict of infanticide.
- (3) Nothing in this Act shall affect the power of the jury upon an indictment for the murder of a child to return a verdict of manslaughter, or a verdict of guilty but insane, ...

=== Amendments ===
The word "if" was substituted for the words "notwithstanding that" in sections 1(1) and (2) by sections 57(2)(a) and (3)(a) of the Coroners and Justice Act 2009. The words "or manslaughter" were inserted in sections 1(1) and (2) by sections 57(2)(a) and (3)(a) of that act.

The words at the end of section 1(3), and section 1(4), of the act were repealed by section 10(2) of, and part III of schedule 3 to, the Criminal Law Act 1967, which came into force on 1 January 1968.

=== "Notwithstanding that" ===
In R v Gore, the Court of Appeal held that this expression meant "even if".

=== Restriction on institution of proceedings ===
Proceedings against a woman for infanticide, if the injury alleged to have caused the death was sustained more than three years before the death occurred, or the person has previously been convicted of an offence committed in circumstances alleged to be connected with the death, may only be instituted by or with the consent of the Attorney General.

=== Alternative verdict ===
Where on the trial of any person for infanticide the jury are of the opinion that the person charged is not guilty of infanticide, but that she is shown by the evidence to be guilty of child destruction, the jury may find her guilty of that offence.

=== Mode of trial ===
Infanticide is triable only on indictment.

=== Sentence ===
The effect of the words "punished as if she had been guilty of the offence of manslaughter" is that a person convicted of infanticide is liable to imprisonment for life.

=== Section 2 - Short title, extent and repeal ===
Section 2(2) of the act provides that the act does not extend to Scotland or Northern Ireland.

Section 2(3) of the act repealed the Infanticide Act 1922 (12 & 13 Geo. 5. c. 18).

== Subsequent developments ==
Section 2(3) of the act was repealed by section 1(1) of, and the first schedule to, the Statute Law Revision Act 1950 (14 Geo. 6. c. 6), which came into force on 23 May 1950, because it was spent by virtue of the Interpretation Act 1889 (52 & 53 Vict. c. 63).

== See also ==
- Infanticide Act
