= Irish Free State (Agreement) Act 1922 =

Act of the Parliament of the United Kingdom

Irish Free State (Agreement) Act 1922 (Note: Section 2.)
- Act of Parliament
- Parliament of the United Kingdom
- Long title: An Act to give the force of Law to certain Articles of Agreement for a Treaty between Great Britain and Ireland, and to enable effect to be given thereto, and for other purposes incidental thereto or consequential thereon.
- Citation: 12 & 13 Geo. 5. c. 4
- Introduced by: David Lloyd George (Commons); Viscount Peel (Lords)
- Territorial extent: United Kingdom

Dates
- Royal assent: 31 March 1922
- Commencement: 31 March 1922 (Note: Section 1(1).)
- Repealed: United Kingdom: 16 November 1989; Republic of Ireland: 8 May 2007
Other legislation
Amended by	Statute Law Revision Act 1953
Repealed by	United Kingdom: Statute Law (Repeals) Act 1989; Republic of Ireland: Statute Law Revision Act 2007
Relates to	Irish Free State Constitution Act 1922; Ireland (Confirmation of Agreement) Act 1925; Irish Free State (Confirmation of Agreement) Act 1929

Status: Repealed

Records of Parliamentary debate relating to the statute from Hansard

Text of statute as originally enacted

The Irish Free State (Agreement) Act 1922 (12 & 13 Geo. 5. c. 4) was an act of the Parliament of the United Kingdom passed on 31 March 1922 giving the force of law to the Anglo-Irish Treaty signed on 6 December 1921. The act was primarily intended to provide interim arrangements necessary before the establishment of the Irish Free State, which under the treaty had to be established on or before 6 December 1922. Ratification of the treaty was not effected by this act, being delayed until the Irish Free State Constitution Act 1922 (13 Geo. 5 Sess. 2. c. 1) passed on 5 December 1922. The earlier act regulated the handover of administration to the Provisional Government established by the treaty.

== Main provisions ==
Section 1(1) of the act provides that:

- the "Articles of Agreement for a Treaty between Great Britain and Ireland set forth in the Schedule to this Act shall have the force of law from the date of the passing of this Act".

Section 1(2) provided that for the purposes of giving effect to article 17 of the treaty:

- the British Government could by Orders in Council transfer powers to the Provisional Government of Southern Ireland;
- the Parliament of Southern Ireland would be dissolved within four months from the passing of the Act; and
- elections would be held for "the House of the Parliament" to which the Provisional Government would be responsible. The Act did not give a name to that Parliament but said that in matters within the jurisdiction of the Provisional Government (i.e. only certain matters concerning Southern Ireland), it would have power to make laws in like manner as the Parliament of the Irish Free State when constituted.

Sections 11 and 12 provided for the right of Northern Ireland to opt out of the new dominion and remain within the United Kingdom.

11. Until the expiration of one month from the passing of the Act of Parliament for the ratification of this instrument, the powers of the Parliament and the Government of the Irish Free State shall not be exercisable as respects Northern Ireland, and the provisions of the Government of Ireland Act, 1920, shall, so far as they relate to Northern Ireland, remain of full force and effect, and no election shall be held for the return of members to serve in the Parliament of the Irish Free State for constituencies in Northern Ireland, unless a resolution is passed by both Houses of the Parliament of Northern Ireland in favour of the holding of such elections before the end of the said month.

12. If before the expiration of the said month, an address is presented to His Majesty by both Houses of the Parliament of Northern Ireland to that effect, the powers of the Parliament and Government of the Irish Free State shall no longer extend to Northern Ireland, and the provisions of the Government of Ireland Act, 1920 (including those relating to the Council of Ireland), shall so far as they relate to Northern Ireland, continue to be of full force and effect, and this instrument shall have effect subject to the necessary modifications.

== Effect ==
Power was transferred to the existing Provisional Government on 1 April 1922 by an Order in Council made under the act (by the king and British Privy Council at Windsor Castle, rather than the Lord Lieutenant of Ireland and Privy Council of Ireland at Dublin Castle). Their ministerial appointments now became official and were announced in Iris Oifigiúil No. 19 of 4 April 1922. The Provisional Government had been constituted on 14 January 1922 under the terms of the treaty and on 16 January chose Michael Collins as its chairman. Until 1 April its operation in UK law was "irregular"; Francis Greer of the Irish Office regarded it as technically an informal committee advising the Lord Lieutenant. In fact, the Provisional Government's only meeting with the Lord Lieutenant was the formal handover of Dublin Castle on 16 January 1922.

The Provisional Government had responsibility for collecting tax and spending revenue and took over the functions of the Dublin Castle administration, and the personnel except those who had moved to Northern Ireland. Responsibility was transferred for the Dublin Metropolitan Police, but not the Royal Irish Constabulary, which was separately disbanded under the Constabulary (Ireland) Act 1922.

The June 1922 election for the Third Dáil served as the requisite election under the act, and the Third Dáil as the House of Parliament to which the Provisional Government was responsible. The Lord Lieutenant of Ireland formally dissolved the Parliament of Southern Ireland, which had never functioned.

Section 1(5) of the act stated explicitly that the act did not effect the ratification of Anglo-Irish Treaty. That was because the "Ulster month" within which the Parliament of Northern Ireland was to have the right to opt out of the nascent Free State began from ratification. While the opt-out was a foregone conclusion, it was politic to delay the inevitable to give the Free State time to establish roots. Ratification was effected Irish Free State Constitution Act 1922 (13 Geo. 5 Sess. 2. c. 1), passed on 5 December 1922, coming into force on 6 December; Northern Ireland triggered the opt-out process the next day.

== Subsequent developments ==
In section 1(3) of the act, the proviso was repealed by section 1 of, and the first schedule to, the Statute Law Revision Act 1953 (2 & 3 Eliz. 2. c. 5), which came into force on 18 December 1953.

The whole act of both 1922 acts were repealed for the United Kingdom by section 1(1) of, and part III of schedule 1 to, the Statute Law (Repeals) Act 1989, which came into force on 16 November 1989.

The whole of both 1922 acts were repealed for the Republic of Ireland by sections 2(1) and 3(1) of, and part 4 of schedule 2 to, the Statute Law Revision Act 2007, which came into force on 8 May 2007.

== Bibliography ==
- Cahillane, Laura (December 2025). "Legal Authority and Ambiguity in Ireland during the Establishment of the State in 1922". Éire-Ireland. 60 (3–4): 146–172. doi:10.1353/eir.2025.a981611.
- McColgan, John (1983). British policy and the Irish administration, 1920–22. London ; Boston: Allen & Unwin. ISBN 978-0-04-941011-4.
- Quekett, Arthur S. (1933). "The Irish Free State (Agreement) Act, 1922". The Constitution Of Northern Ireland. Vol. Part II. Belfast: HMSO. pp. 163–194.
- Torrance, David (5 December 2022). "The Anglo-Irish Treaty, 1921" (PDF). House of Commons Briefing Papers (9260).
