= Infanticide Act (Northern Ireland) 1939 =

Act of the Parliament of Northern Ireland

Infanticide Act (Northern Ireland) 1939 (Note: section 2(1).)
- Act of Parliament
- Parliament of Northern Ireland
- Long title: An Act to repeal and re-enact with modifications the provisions of the Infanticide Act, 1922, as applied to Northern Ireland by the Uniformity of Laws Act (Northern Ireland), 1922.
- Citation: 3 & 4 Geo. 6. c. 5 (N.I.)
- Territorial extent: Northern Ireland

Dates
- Royal assent: 2 May 1939
- Commencement: 2 May 1939
Other legislation
Relates to	Infanticide Act 1938

Status: Current legislation

Revised text of statute as amended

Text of the Infanticide Act (Northern Ireland) 1939 as in force today (including any amendments) within the United Kingdom, from legislation.gov.uk.

The Infanticide Act (Northern Ireland) 1939 (3 & 4 Geo. 6. c. 5 (N.I.)) is an act of the Parliament of Northern Ireland.

== Passage ==
The act was passed in May 1939.

== Provisions ==
The act was broadly modelled on the Infanticide Act 1938 (1 & 2 Geo. 6. c. 36). The act created an offence of infanticide for the first time in Northern Ireland.

== See also ==
- Infanticide Act
