= Gladstone v Bower =

1959 case in the English Court of Appeal

- Court: Court of Appeal of England and Wales
- Citations: [1960] 2 QB 384; (1960) 3 All ER 35

Court membership
- Judges sitting: Sellers LJ; Pearce LJ; Devlin LJ

Gladstone v Bower [1960] 2 QB 384 was a 1959 case in the English Court of Appeal, concerning security of tenure in tenancies of agricultural holdings. It arose from what was then thought to be a lacuna in the Agricultural Holdings Act 1948.

== Facts ==
Under the Agricultural Holdings Act 1948, a tenancy for a term certain of less than a year would be converted to a year-on-year tenancy by the operation of section 2, and a tenancy for a term certain of two to five years would be converted to a year-on-year tenancy by the operation of section 3. In Gladstone v Bower, the term certain was eighteen months.

== Judgment ==
The Court of Appeal held that because neither section 2 nor section 3 of the 1948 act applied, the tenancy expired at the end of the fixed term and the landlord was entitled to recover possession.

== Significance ==
After the decision, the presiding judge of the initial case (Diplock J) expected that the law would be changed. As he put it, "If it were permissible to speculate at large as to the intentions of Parliament, I should be tempted to guess that Parliament simply overlooked the case of a lease for a fixed term of between one and two years." He felt that Parliament could not possibly have intended to confer security of tenure on both lettings of less than a year and more than two years, but to leave out lettings for terms in between. However, Parliament expressly excluded such agreements from security of tenure in the Agriculture (Miscellaneous Provisions) Act 1976, the Agricultural Holdings Act 1984 and the Agricultural Holdings Act 1986. After 1959, agricultural tenancies for terms of this period became known as Gladstone v Bower agreements, under which the landlord need not serve a notice to quit to end the tenancy, but if the tenant were allowed to hold over, he might obtain statutory security.

The Agricultural Tenancies Act 1995 has superseded the previous acts and new Gladstone v Bower agreements can no longer be created.

== See also ==
- English land law
