= Agriculture in the United Kingdom =

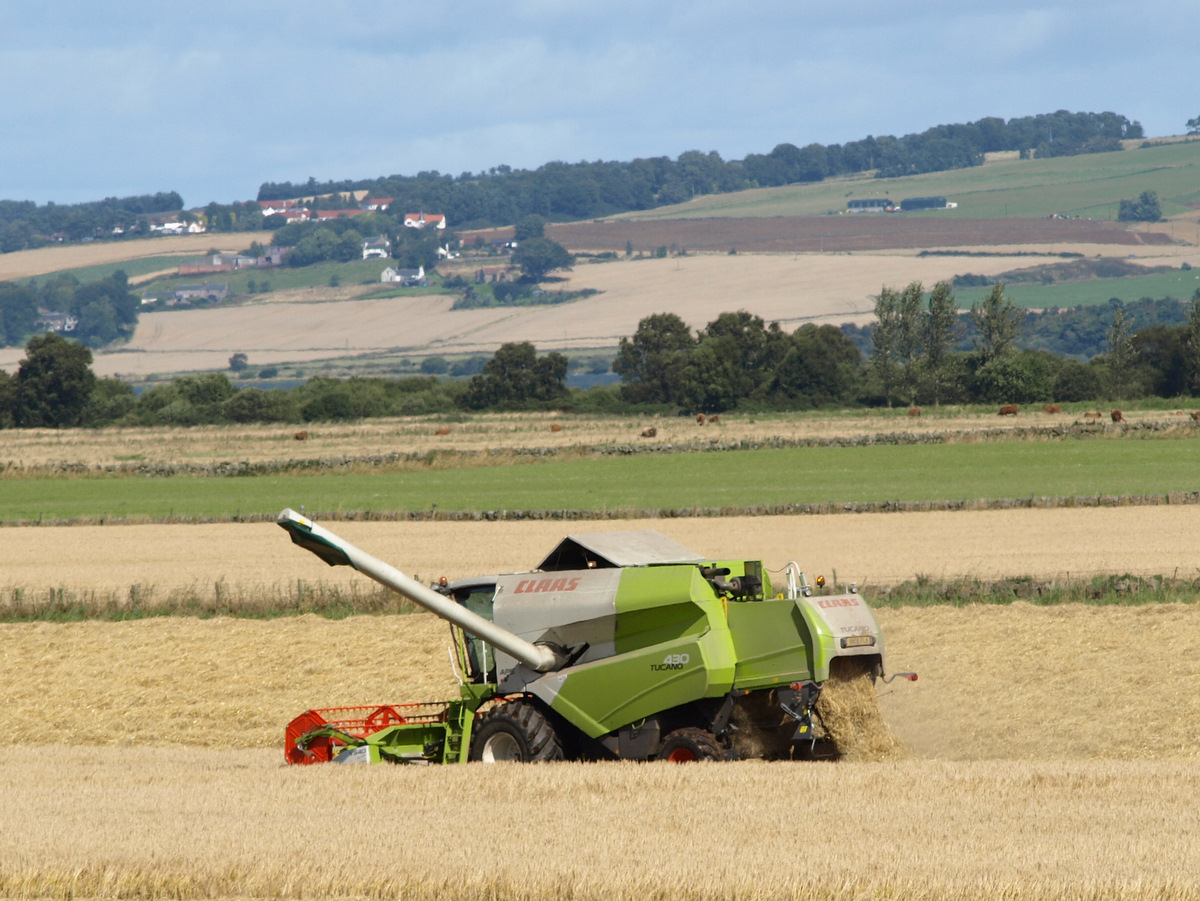
A combine harvester in Scotland

Agriculture in the United Kingdom uses 69% of the country's land area, employs around 446,000 people and contributes 0.6% of its gross value added (£15.9 billion). The UK currently produces about 60% of its domestic food consumption.

Agricultural activity occurs in most rural locations. It is concentrated in the drier east (for crops) and the wetter west (for livestock). There are 191,000 farm holdings, which vary widely in size.

Despite skilled farmers, advanced technology, fertile soil and subsidies, farm earnings are relatively low, mainly due to low prices at the farm gate. Low earnings, high land prices and a shortage of let farmland discourage young people from joining the industry. The average (median) age of the British farm holder was about 60 in 2016; the UK government has stopped collecting age data for farmers.

Recently there have been moves towards organic farming in an attempt to sustain profits, and many farmers supplement their income by diversifying activities away from pure agriculture. Biofuels present new opportunities for farmers against a background of rising fears about fossil fuel prices, energy security, and climate change. Intensive agriculture in the UK poses a threat to biodiversity and soil health.

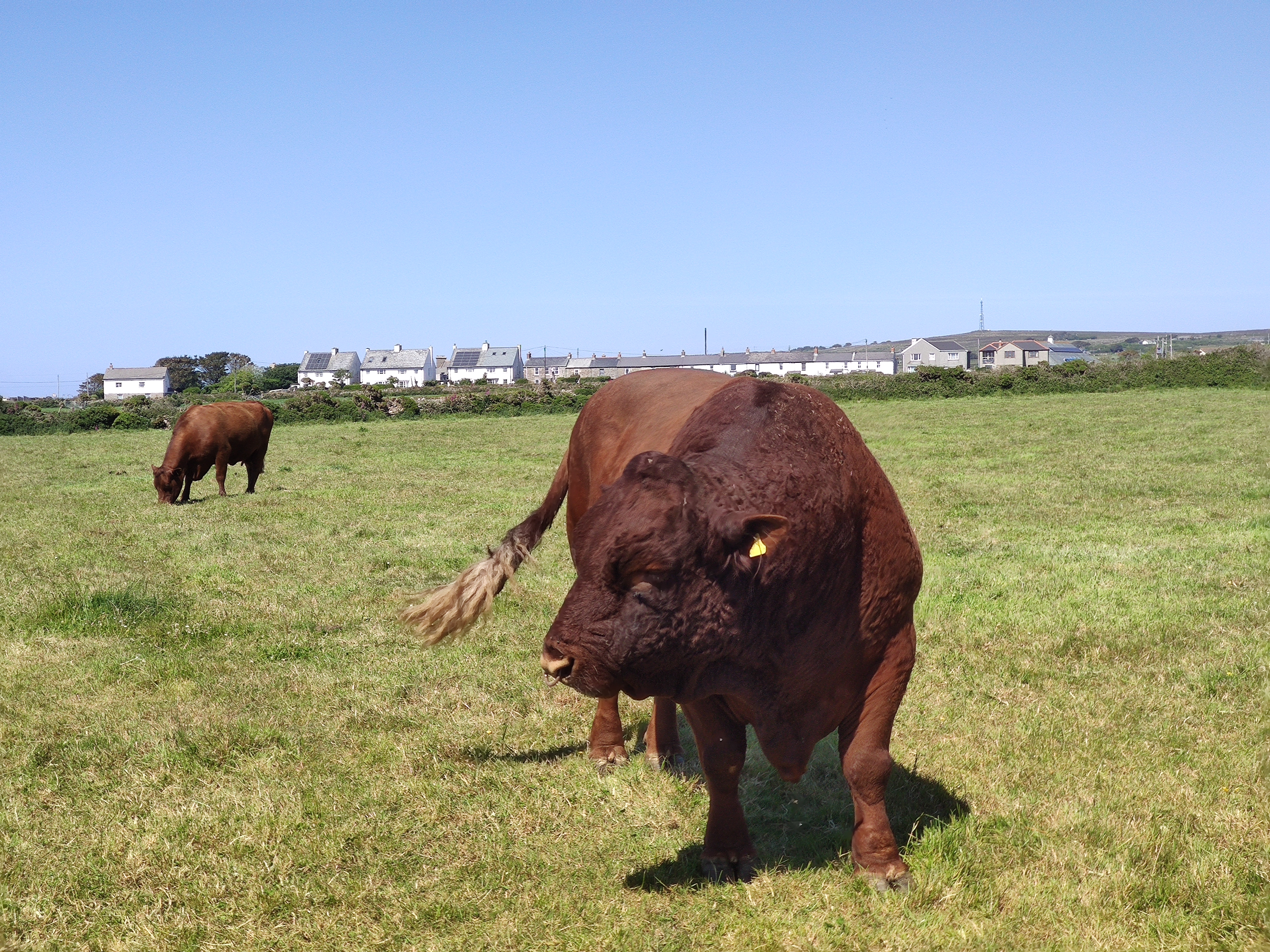
Bull in a field

== Overview ==
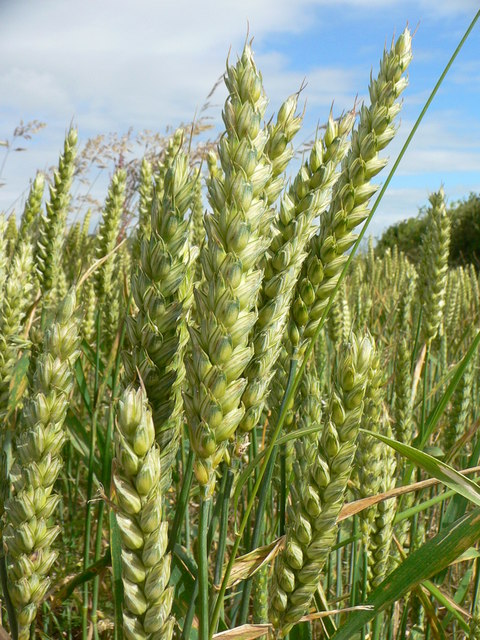
Wheat is a major crop in the UK.

The total area of agricultural holdings is about 41.6 million acres (16.8 million hectares), of which about a third are arable and most of the rest is grassland. During the growing season about 72% of the arable area is cereal crops, and of the cereal crop area, more than 57% is wheat. There are about 33 million sheep, 9.6 million cattle, 188 million poultry and 5.2 million pigs. These are arranged on about 191,000 holdings, whose average croppable area is around 69 hectares (170 acres). About 70% of farms are owner-occupied or mostly so (perhaps with individual barns or fields let out), and the remainder are rented to tenant farmers. Farmers represent an ageing population, partly due to low earnings and barriers to entry, and it is increasingly hard to recruit young people into farming. The average farm holder is about 60 years old.

British farming is on the whole intensive and highly mechanised. This approach is well-suited to the current distribution infrastructure, but can be less productive by area than smaller scale, diversified farming. The UK produces only 60% of the food it consumes. The vast majority of imports and exports are with other Western European countries.

Farming is subsidised, with subsidies to farmers totalling more than £3 billion (after deduction of levies).

=== Regional variations ===
While there is little difference between farming practices in England, Scotland, Wales and Northern Ireland in places where the terrain is similar, the geography and the quality of the farmland does have an impact. In Wales, 80% of the farmland is designated as a "Less Favoured Area", and in Scotland the figure is 84%. "Less Favoured Area" means land that produces a lower agricultural yield—typically upland moors and hill farms—which tend to focus on sheep and sometimes dairy farming. In England, the eastern and southern areas where the fields are flatter, larger and more open tend to concentrate on cereal crops, while the hillier northern and western areas with smaller, more enclosed fields tend to concentrate on livestock farming.

== History ==
=== Before 1500 ===
Farming was introduced in the British Isles between about 5000 BC and 4500 BC in an influx of Mesolithic people after the end of the Pleistocene. It took 2,000 years for farming to extend across all the isles. Wheat and barley were grown in small plots near family homes. Sheep, goats and cattle came in from Europe, and pigs were tamed from native wild boar. Agricultural and hunter-gatherer groups met and traded with each other in the early Neolithic.

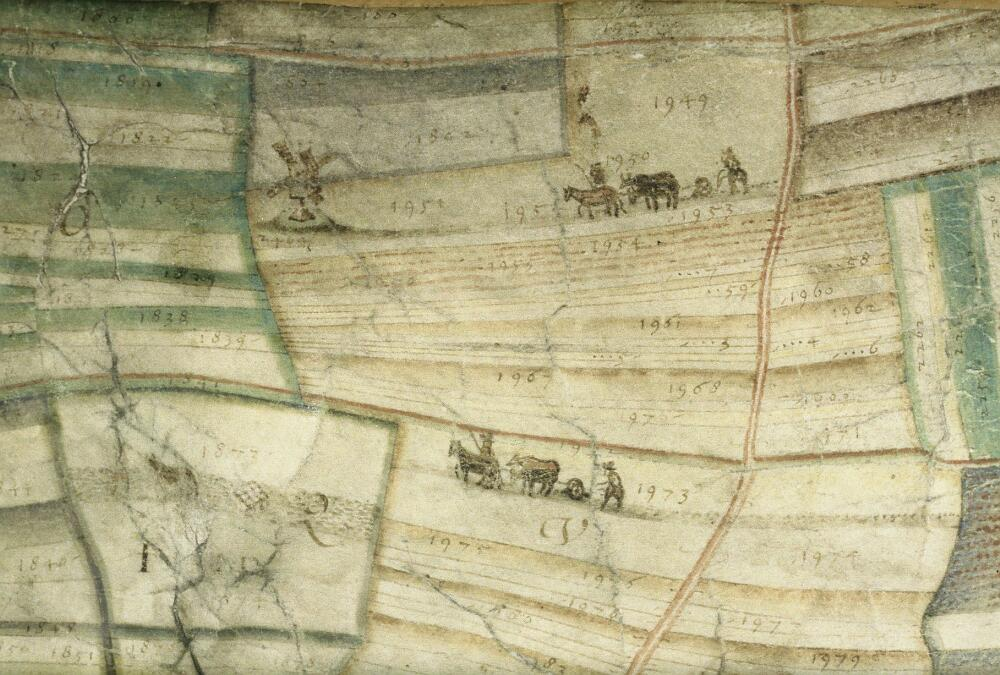
1635 Laxton map showing numbered strips, ploughs drawn by horse and oxen, and a windmill

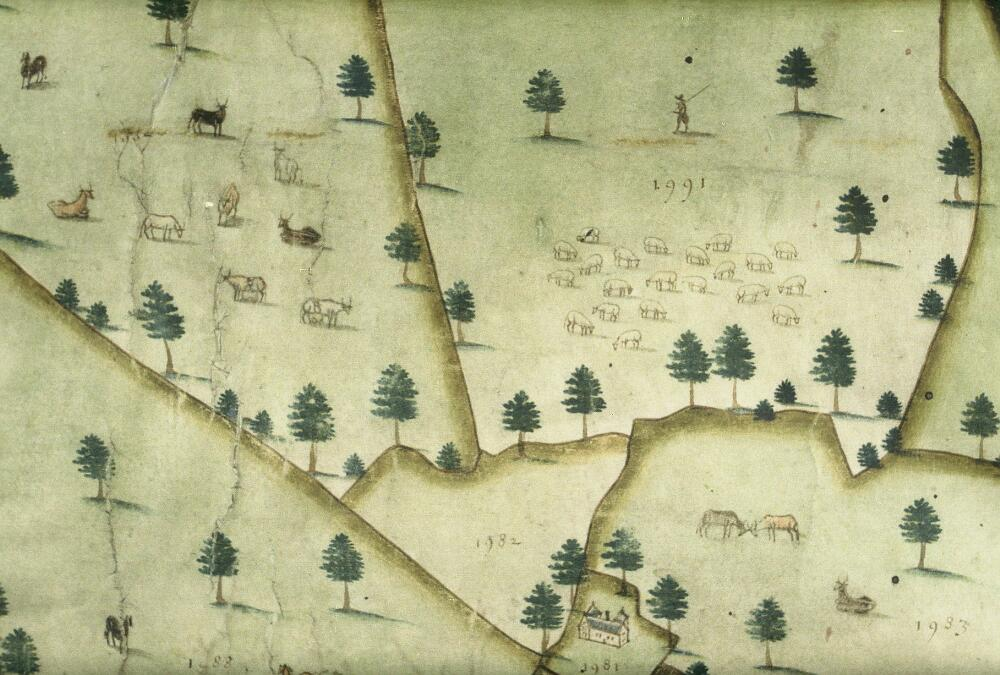
1635 Laxton map showing numbered areas including adjoining sheep and cattle/horse grazing areas, distinct field boundaries and a set of buildings protected by four trees

The Saxons and the Vikings had open-field farming systems. Arable farming expanded between the 8th and 13th centuries in England. Under the Normans and Plantagenets fens were drained, woods cleared and farmland expanded to feed a rising population, until the Black Death reached Britain in 1349. This and later epidemics caused the population to fall; a third of the population in England died between 1349 and 1350. In consequence, areas of farmland were abandoned. The feudal system began to break down as labourers, in short supply after the plague, demanded wages (instead of subsistence) and better conditions. Also, a series of poor harvests after about 1315 coincided with poor weather across northern Europe, which continued on and off until about 1375. The population did not recover to 1300 levels for 200 to 300 years.

The last surviving working mediaeval strip farming system with common grazings is in Laxton, Nottinghamshire in England.

=== 1500 to 1750 ===
When King Henry VIII made himself Supreme Head of the Church of England in 1531, he set about the dissolution of the monasteries, which was largely complete by 1540. The monasteries had been major landowners and the Crown took over their land, amounting to about 2,000,000 acres (810,000 ha). This land was largely sold off to fund Henry's military ambitions in France and Scotland, and the main buyers were the landed gentry. Agriculture boomed as grain prices increased sixfold by 1650. Improvements in transport, particularly along rivers and coasts, brought beef and dairy products from the north of England to London.

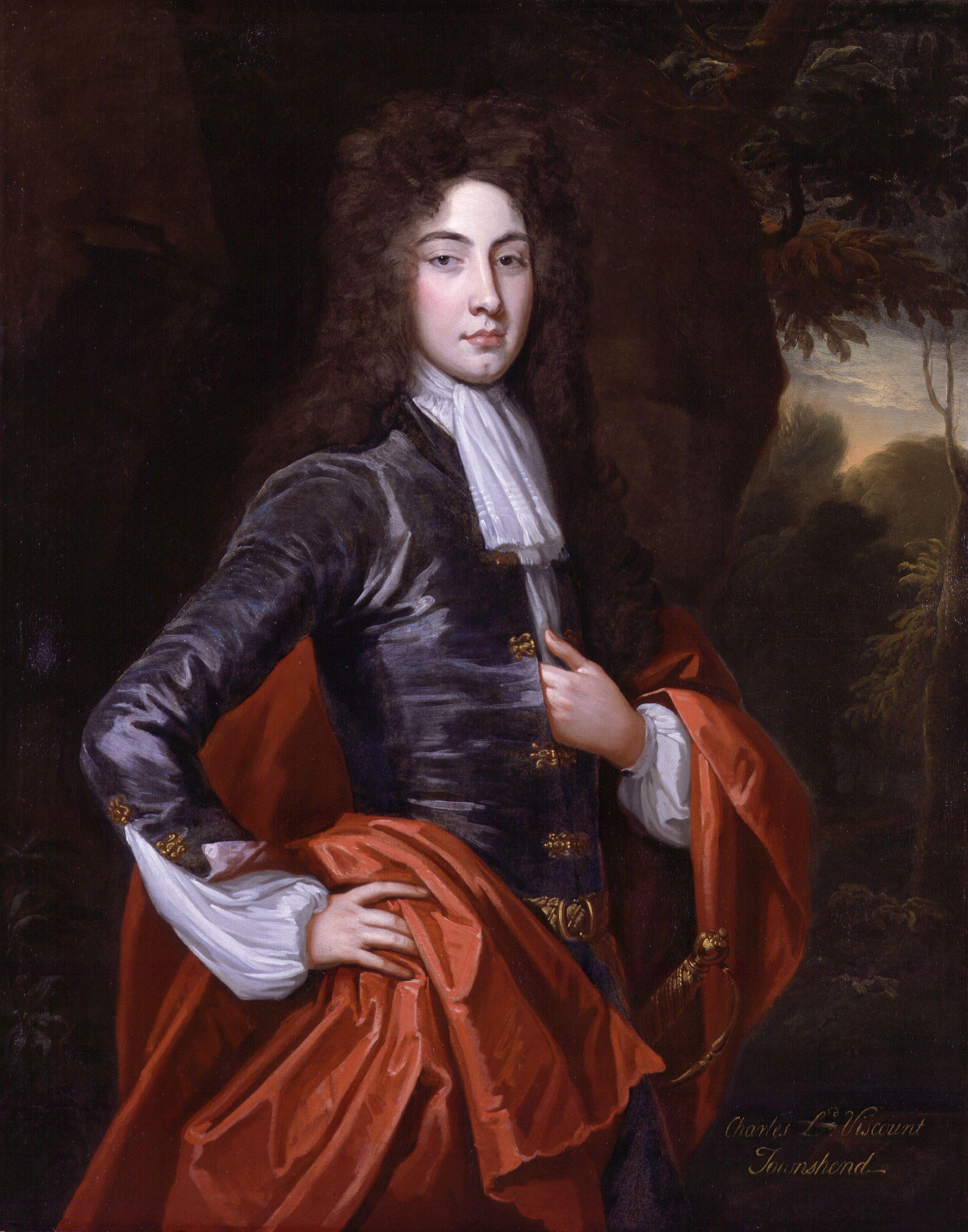
Charles Viscount Townshend

Jethro Tull, a Berkshire farmer, invented his famous rotating-cylinder seed drill. His 1731 book, The New Horse Hoeing Husbandry, explained the systems and devices he espoused to improve agriculture. The book had such an impact that its influence can still be seen in some aspects of modern farming. Charles Townsend, a viscount known as "Turnip Townsend", in the 1730s introduced turnip farming on a large scale. This created a four-crop rotation (wheat, turnips, barley and clover) which allowed fertility to be maintained with much less fallow land. Clover increases mineral nitrogen in the soil and clover and turnips are good fodder crops for livestock, which in turn improve the soil by their manure.

=== 1750 to 1850 ===
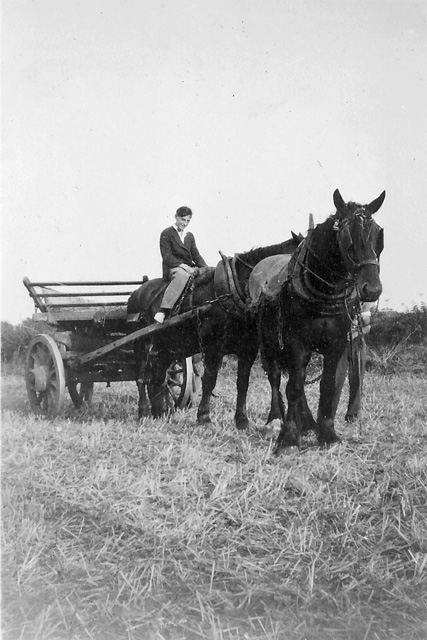
A haywain

Between 1750 and 1850, the English population nearly tripled, with an estimated increase from 5.7 million to 16.6 million. These people were fed by intensified agriculture and land reclamation from the Fens, woodlands, and upland pastures. The crop mix changed, with wheat and rye replacing barley. Nitrogen fixing plants such as legumes led to sustainable increased yields. These increased yields, combined with improved farming machinery and then-new capitalist ways of organising labour, meant that increased crop production did not need much more manpower, which freed labour for non-agricultural work. Indeed, by 1850 Britain had the smallest proportion of its population engaged in farming of any country in the world, at 22%.

During the 18th century, a large share of farmers were literate and numerate, skills that were not widespread in the early modern period.

==== Enclosures ====
Open fields divided among several tenants reduced risk by giving all farmers diverse soils and crops, so no one faced famine while others prospered. But the system was inefficient. Poor farmers got as much land as good farmers. By the 18th century, enclosures came in poorer regions where several landholders were more willing to sell land. After 1760, though, new laws allowed the enclosure of lands with more complex ownership structures. The result was an added £4 million to England's national income.

During the 18th and 19th centuries, enclosures were by means of special acts of Parliament. Strips in the open fields became more cohesive units, and remaining pasture commons or wastes were enclosed. Enclosure involved extinguishing of common rights. This allowed farmers to consolidate and fence off their own large plots of land. Voluntary enclosure was also commonplace.

At the time of the parliamentary enclosures, most manors had seen consolidation of tenant farms into large landholdings. Larger landholders already held the bulk of the land. Although they 'held' land, they did not legally own it in today's sense. They also had to respect the open field system rights, when demanded, even when in practice the rights were not widely in use. Each large landholding would consist of scattered patches, not consolidated farms. In many cases enclosures were largely an exchange and consolidation of land, and exchange not otherwise possible under the legal system. Enclosure under the scheme of the Inclosure Act 1773 permitted the fencing and regulation of arable land if three quarters of the owners in number and value of the land approved. Regulations and allotments made were valid for six years. The lord of the manor and three quarters of the commoners acting together were empowered to lease one twelfth of the land for the improvement of the remainder.

Enclosure following private or local act of Parliament could also extinguish common rights. Without unanimous extinguishment, the entire system survived at common law. With land one held, one could not formally exchange the land, consolidate fields, or entirely exclude others. Strict enforcement of legal rights may not always have been seen in practice. Parliamentary inclosure was seen as a cost-effective method of creating a legally binding settlement. This is because of the costs (time, money, complexity) of using the common law and equity legal systems. Statute required consent of the owners of 4/5ths of the land (copy and freeholders).

The primary benefits to large land holders came from increased value of their own land, not from expropriation. Smaller holders could sell their land to larger ones for a higher price post enclosure. There was not much evidence that the common rights were particularly valuable. Protests against parliamentary inclosure continued, sometimes in Parliament itself, frequently in the villages affected, and sometimes as organised mass revolts. Voluntary enclosure was frequent at that time. Enclosed land was twice as valuable, a price which could be sustained only by its higher productivity.

===== Enclosures in Scotland =====
Enclosure in Scotland is associated with sudden and large-scale clearances, perhaps due to the prevalence of cottar tenure whereby a dwelling and a small area of land is made available for so long only as the owner of it allows.

==== Depression 1815–1836 ====
The period 1750–1850 included a twenty-year depression in agriculture 1815 to 1836. It was so severe that landlords as well as tenants suffered financial ruin, and large areas of farmland were entirely abandoned. The ancient landlord and tenant system was unsuited to new-style, capital-intensive farms. Parliament began to review the legislation, for example by distinguishing between farm improvements that the tenant should fund, and those the landlord should fund. Parliament was concerned with the issue of tenant right, i.e. the sum payable to an outgoing tenant for farm improvements that the tenant had funded and, if crops were in the ground when the tenant left, compensation for their value. This was dealt with in accordance with local custom, which might vary from place to place. In 1848 a parliamentary committee examined the possibility of a standardised system, but a Bill on the matter was not passed until 1875.

==== The Corn Laws and their repeal ====
Between 1815 and 1846, Corn Laws were enacted to protect domestic agriculture by imposing a tax on imported grain. They were repealed after political lobbying by the Anti-Corn Law League. The issue was divisive because of urbanisation in the UK and its need for cheap food, as well as the influence of free trade doctrines. The Corn Laws' repeal initially steadied grain prices. Experts differ over whether the Corn Laws were still relevant by 1846, because of low prices and/or self-sufficiency in grain.

=== 1850 to 1939 ===
The American Civil War ended in 1865, and by 1875, with new steam-powered railways and ships, the United States was exporting a substantial excess of cereals. The area planted with wheat in the United Kingdom dropped from 3,514,033 acres (1,422,079 ha) in 1875 to 1,836,598 acres (743,245 ha) in 1905. At the same time, Britain suffered a series of poor harvests. By 1891 reliable refrigeration technology brought cheap frozen meat from Australia, New Zealand and South America to the British market. British farm products declined significantly as a percentage of GDP during the period 1860–1914. In 1860 agriculture represented 20% of GDP. By 1913 it had fallen to 7%. The period 1850–1914 has been described as "completing the shift to a fundamentally urban and industrial society".

Invented in around 1885, the digging plough is a plough with a wider share, which cuts a wider shallower furrow, after which the slice of soil is inverted by a short concave mould-board with a sharp turn. This has the effect of breaking up and pulverising the soil, leaving no visible furrow and facilitating the use of a seed drill for planting. Earlier ploughs were simply large hoes for stirring the soil, drawn by animals, that left furrows suitable for distribution of seed by hand.

==== The First World War ====
The biggest challenge faced by agriculture was the unavailability of manpower due to the large numbers of men who joined the armed forces in the early years of the War. By the end of 1916, 4 million men had become participant in the armed forces, and agriculture was given no special treatment. It was not until 1917 that agricultural production was overseen by County Executive Committees.

==== Interbellum ====
Although rationing during the First World War was limited to the end of 1917 and 1918, a change of mood arose about food security. The Ministry of Food was created in 1916. There was an opinion that a man who had fought for his country should be entitled to retire to a smallholding on British land that would provide him with a livelihood. This led to various initiatives, including making housing available, collectively called "Homes for Heroes." The priorities were established in the Housing, Town Planning, &c. Act 1919. Riddrie, a suburb of Glasgow, was the first estate to be completed in 1922 under that act. By 1926 agricultural law had become openly redistributive in favour of ex-servicemen. County councils had compulsory purchase powers to requisition land they could let as smallholdings. Ex-servicemen were the preferred tenants. The tenant could then buy the land and could ask the council to lend them money to fund the purchase as a mortgage. The council could not refuse without the Minister of Agriculture's permission.

Government control of agriculture during the First World War was removed in 1921 by the repeal of the Agriculture Act 1920. This has been described as "the great betrayal" but has also been found to be welcomed by a section of the farming community that preferred to trade in the market and resented the previous restraints. In the inter-war years 1919–1939 agriculture in Britain was not the subject of protectionist policies but had to absorb price falls resulting from increased domestic production and the effects of the imperial preference system favouring the Dominions. By 1938, 88% of wheat was imported, 96% of butter, 76% of cheese and about half the eggs and meat.

==== Legislative change in respect of tenanted land 1875–1923 ====
The Agricultural Holdings (England) Act 1875 (38 & 39 Vict. c. 92) rewrote the law on tenant right such that tenants received consistent levels of compensation for the value of their improvements to the holding and any crops in the ground. It also gave tenants the right to remove fixtures they had provided, increased the period of a notice to quit from six months to twelve, and brought in an agricultural dispute resolution procedure.

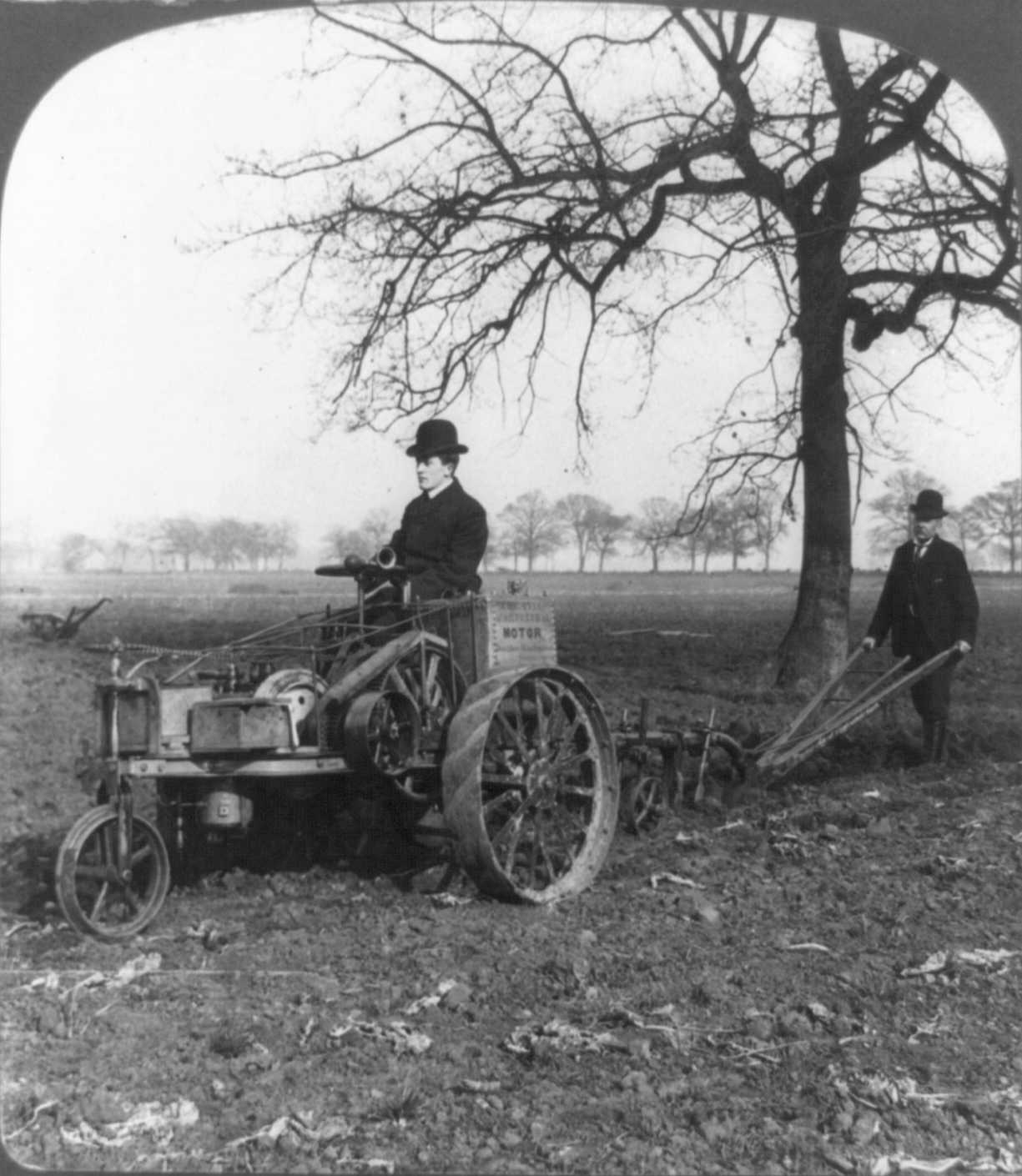
Ivel Tractor in Ploughing Demonstration, England, 1905

Some landlords reacted to the Agricultural Holdings (England) Act 1875 by refusing to let land on a tenancy, instead contracting out the labour to contract farmers. Parliament responded with the Agricultural Holdings (England) Act 1883 (46 & 47 Vict. c. 61), which prevented contracting out on terms less favourable than a normal tenancy. Subsequently the Agricultural Holdings Act 1900 (63 & 64 Vict. c. 50) and the Agricultural Holdings Act 1906 (6 Edw. 7. c. 56) further refined the dispute resolution procedure; required landlords to compensate tenants for their damaged crops if the damage was caused by game that the landlord did not allow tenants to kill; allowed tenants to choose for themselves what crops to grow, except in the last year of the tenancy; and prevented penal rents being charged except in special circumstances. The legislation was consolidated in the Agricultural Holdings Act 1908 (8 Edw. 7. c. 28). Further Agricultural Holdings Acts came into force; the Agricultural Holdings Act 1914 (4 & 5 Geo. 5. c. 7), the Agriculture Act 1920 (10 & 11 Geo. 5. c. 76), and then a further consolidating act, the Agricultural Holdings Act 1923 (13 & 14 Geo. 5. c. 9).

The legislative focus on tenant's improvements is against a background where it was the assumed practice for the tenant to provide seed, implements, livestock, machinery and fertilisers. By 1914 a large mixed arable/livestock farm would be typically providing £10 per acre of his own capital.

==== The Second World War ====
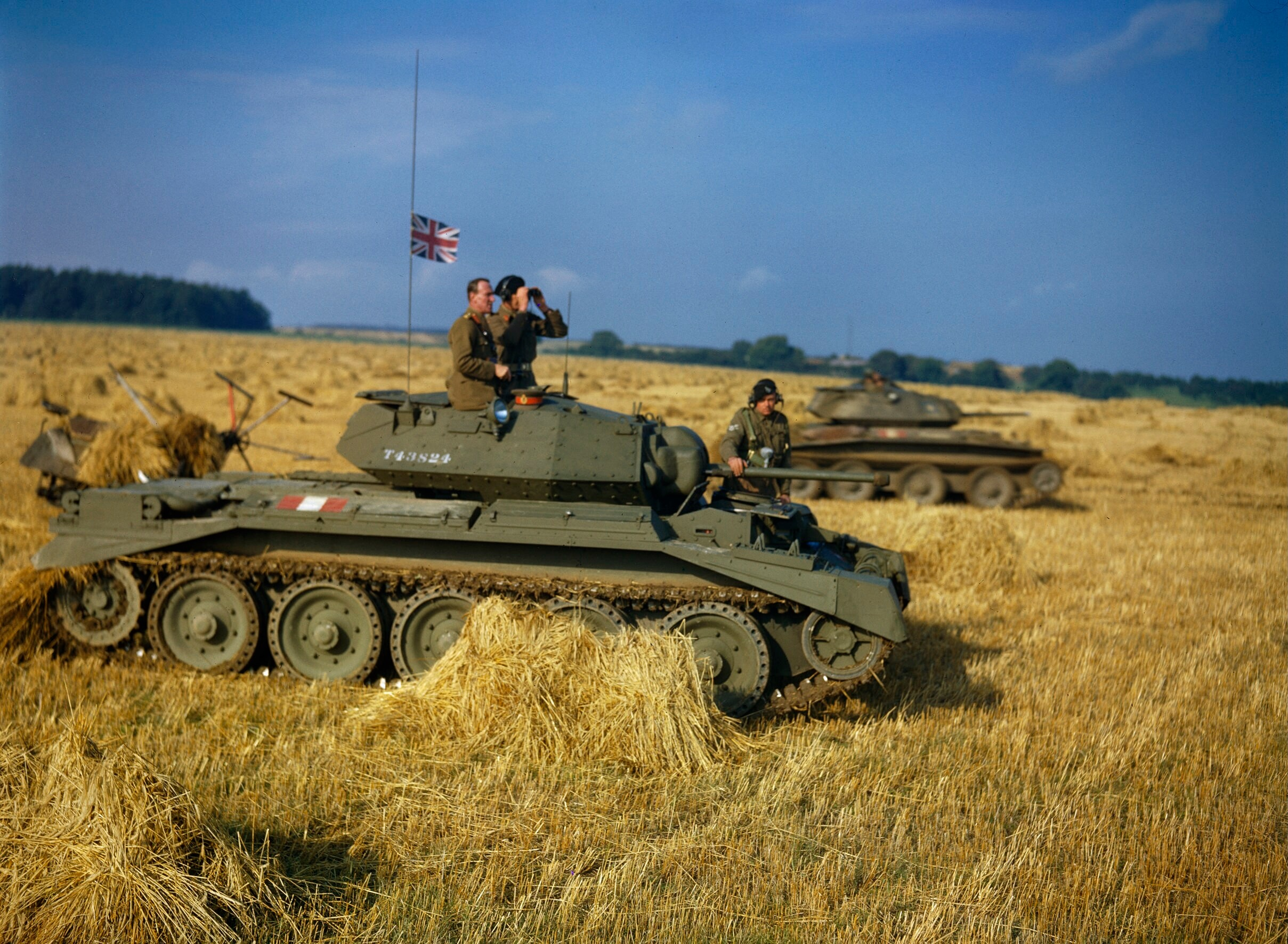
British tanks on a military exercise in a Yorkshire cornfield in 1942

Before the Second World War started, Britain imported 55 million tons of food a year. By the end of 1939, this had dropped to 12 million.

Grain output rose somewhat during the three years from 1938/1939. Wheat and barley figures increased by two thirds and potatoes doubled. Livestock production was static or fell. Cattle were static and sheep numbers dropped. Large increases in farm income were effected by direct payments (after the War becoming deficiency payments covering the gap between average farm prices and levels guaranteed for 11 products). Farm incomes in this three year period accordingly tripled.

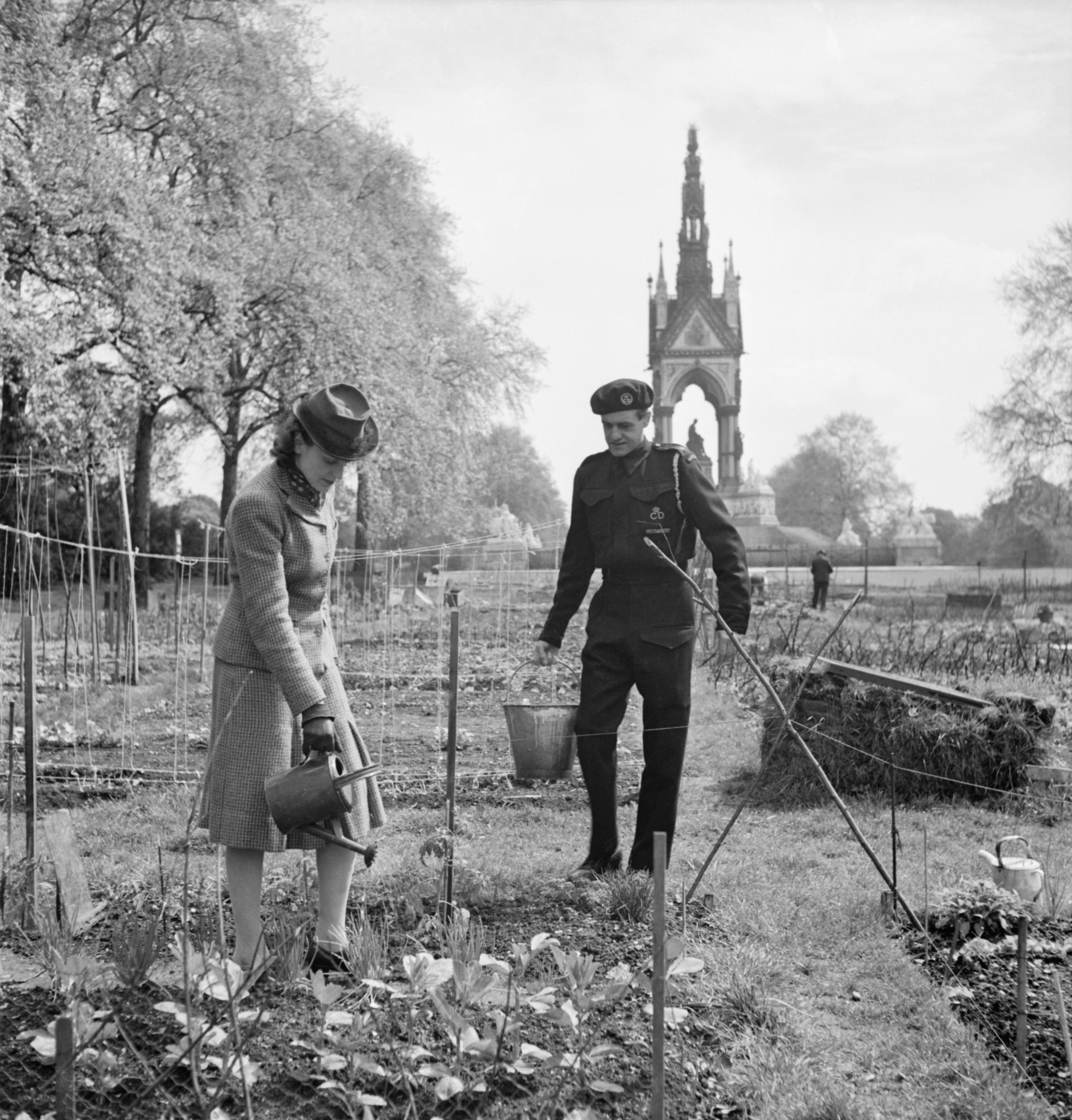
1942 in Kensington in regularly bombed Central London. Here a fashionably dressed lady and her soldier friend attend to an allotment to supplement scarce food rations. This was part of the Dig for Victory campaign.

Food rationing was introduced at the start of 1940. It did not completely end until July 1954. The government encouraged people to grow their own food in victory gardens, and householders were encouraged to keep rabbits and chickens for the table. There were 1.5 million allotments by 1943. Potatoes became "the food of the war". Because so many men had been conscripted into the army, women were drafted in to work the land; they were called the Women's Land Army, or less formally, "land girls".

Famously, the government responded to a temporary wartime oversupply of carrots by suggesting that the RAF's exceptional night-flying was due to eating carotene. The ruse worked: consumption of carrots increased sharply because people thought carrots might help them see in the blackout, thus taking the pressure off other food supplies. But with so much of the agricultural labour force fighting, pressure on food supplies worldwide increased throughout the war. The government estimated that in 1945 world meat consumption would exceed supply by 1.8 million tons and that only wheat would be "available in abundance". The Prime Minister suggested that if necessary, food supplies could take priority over supplies for the military, and considered the possibility of famine in the occupied territories after the war.

=== 1945 to 2000 ===
==== 1945–1985 ====
The Agriculture Act 1947 (10 & 11 Geo. 6. c. 48) broadly revamped agricultural law. It was a reaction to the privations of the Second World War, and was aimed at food security, so as to reduce the risk of a hostile foreign power being able to starve the UK into submission. The act guaranteed prices, markets and tenure, so that a farmer could be assured that his land would not be taken away and whatever he grew would be sold at a known price. The Agricultural Holdings Act 1948 (11 & 12 Geo. 6. c. 63) remained the governing code in England and Wales until its replacement by the Agricultural Holdings Act 1986 (c. 5), which consolidated intervening amending statutes. These acts made it hard to evict tenant farmers. With the new security tenants enjoyed, a system of rent reviews was necessary to take account of land price inflation.

Agriculture (Miscellaneous Provisions) Act 1943 (Note: Section 24.)
- Act of Parliament
- Parliament of the United Kingdom
- Long title: An Act to amend the law relating to agriculture, agricultural land and the drainage of land, and to amend the Corn Returns Act, 1882.
- Citation: 6 & 7 Geo. 6. c. 16
- Territorial extent: England and Wales; Scotland; Northern Ireland (sections 1, 3 and 13); (Note: Section 22.)

Dates
- Royal assent: 22 April 1943
- Commencement: 22 April 1943 (Note: The Acts of Parliament (Commencement) Act 1793.)
Other legislation
Amends	Corn Returns Act 1882
Amended by	Land Drainage Act 1961; Statute Law (Repeals) Act 1973; Statute Law (Repeals) Act 1986; Statute Law (Repeals) Act 2004; Agriculture and Horticulture Development Board Order 2008; Agriculture and Rural Communities (Scotland) Act 2024

Status: Partially repealed

Text of statute as originally enacted

Text of the Agriculture (Miscellaneous Provisions) Act 1943 as in force today (including any amendments) within the United Kingdom, from legislation.gov.uk.

Agriculture (Miscellaneous Provisions) Act 1954 (Note: Section 17(1).)
- Act of Parliament
- Parliament of the United Kingdom
- Long title: An Act to continue the power to make grants or contributions in respect of field drainage, liming and other matters; to amend Part IV of the Agriculture Act, 1947, with respect to the holdings to be treated as smallholdings, and to the contributions to losses of smallholdings authorities; to alter the manner of appointing nominated members of Agricultural Land Tribunals, and enable those Tribunals to award costs and to refer questions of law to the High Court; to amend the Agricultural Holdings Act, 1948, with respect to the operation of certain notices to quit; to make further provision with respect to research and education in sugar beet growing, to the collection of waste for use as animal feeding stuffs, to preventing the spread of pests and diseases by imported bees and to the application of the Diseases of Animals Act, 1950, to air transport; to amend the Seeds Act, 1920, with respect to the consequences of contraventions of that Act, and to the delivery and effect of particulars given thereunder; to amend the law as to agricultural wages of holiday workers in Scotland; and to extend the Corn Returns Act, 1882, to Scotland.
- Citation: 2 & 3 Eliz. 2. c. 39
- Territorial extent: England and Wales; Scotland; Northern Ireland (sections 2, 10, 11 and 12); (Note: Section 16.)

Dates
- Royal assent: 4 June 1954
- Commencement: 4 June 1954
Other legislation
Amends	Corn Returns Act 1882; Seeds Act 1920; Agriculture Act 1947; Agricultural Holdings Act 1948; Diseases of Animals Act 1950
Amended by	Plant Varieties and Seeds Act 1964; Statute Law (Repeals) Act 1973; Statute Law (Repeals) Act 1986; Statute Law (Repeals) Act 1993; Statute Law (Repeals) Act 2004; Agriculture and Rural Communities (Scotland) Act 2024

Status: Amended

Text of statute as originally enacted

Text of the Agriculture (Miscellaneous Provisions) Act 1954 as in force today (including any amendments) within the United Kingdom, from legislation.gov.uk.

Agriculture (Miscellaneous Provisions) Act 1963 (Note: Section 29(1).)
- Act of Parliament
- Parliament of the United Kingdom
- Long title: An Act to make further provision as to grants and contributions for agricultural and certain horticultural purposes and otherwise to amend the law relating to agriculture, agricultural produce and agricultural land; to provide for the purchase by the Sugar Board of sugar from the Republic of Ireland; to make new provision as to the charging of certain fees; and for purposes connected with those matters.
- Citation: 1963 c. 11
- Territorial extent: England and Wales (in part); Scotland (in part); Northern Ireland (in part); (Note: Section 29(3)–(4).)

Dates
- Royal assent: 15 May 1963
- Commencement: 15 May 1963
Other legislation
Amended by	Plant Varieties and Seeds Act 1964; Statute Law (Repeals) Act 1973; Statute Law (Repeals) Act 1976; Agricultural Holdings (Notices to Quit) Act 1977; Statute Law (Repeals) Act 1986; Agricultural Holdings (Scotland) Act 1991; Statute Law (Repeals) Act 2004; Agriculture and Rural Communities (Scotland) Act 2024

Status: Amended

Text of statute as originally enacted

Text of the Agriculture (Miscellaneous Provisions) Act 1963 as in force today (including any amendments) within the United Kingdom, from legislation.gov.uk.

Agriculture (Miscellaneous Provisions) Act 1968 (Note: Section 54(1).)
- Act of Parliament
- Parliament of the United Kingdom
- Long title: An Act to make further provision with respect to the welfare of livestock; to provide for additional payments for certain tenants of agricultural holdings who receive compensation for disturbance in respect of their holdings or whose land is acquired or taken possession of compulsorily or whose landlords resume possession of the land for non-agricultural purposes; to make further provision with respect to the termination of tenancies of agricultural holdings in Scotland acquired by succession; to make further provision for England and Wales with respect to drainage charges, drainage rates and grants and advances to drainage authorities; to provide for payments in respect of bacon and grants in respect of break crops and the supply of water to certain buildings; to make further provision with respect to the compensation of tenants of agricultural holdings whose land is acquired or taken possession of compulsorily; to amend section 3 of the Parks Regulation (Amendment) Act 1926, the Agricultural Wages Act 1948 and the Agricultural Wages (Scotland) Act 1949, the Restrictive Trade Practices Act 1956 in its application to agricultural marketing boards, section 53(2) of the Agricultural Marketing Act 1958, section 1 of the Agricultural and Forestry Associations Act 1962, the Plant Varieties and Seeds Act 1964 and section 49 of the Agriculture Act 1967; and for purposes connected with the matters aforesaid.
- Citation: 1968 c. 34
- Territorial extent: England and Wales (in part); Scotland (in part); Northern Ireland (in part); (Note: Section 54(3)–(4).)

Dates
- Royal assent: 3 July 1968
- Commencement: 3 July 1968 (except part I); 3 September 1968 (part I); (Note: Section 54(2).)
Other legislation
Amends	Parks Regulation (Amendment) Act 1926; Agricultural Wages Act 1948; Agricultural Wages (Scotland) Act 1949; Restrictive Trade Practices Act 1956; Agricultural Marketing Act 1958; Agricultural and Forestry Associations Act 1962; Plant Varieties and Seeds Act 1964; Agriculture Act 1967
Amended by	Northern Ireland Constitution Act 1973; Restrictive Trade Practices Act 1976; Land Drainage Act 1976; Statute Law (Repeals) Act 1977; Statute Law (Repeals) Act 1986; Agricultural Holdings (Scotland) Act 1991; Statute Law (Repeals) Act 1993; Statute Law (Repeals) Act 2004

Status: Amended

Text of statute as originally enacted

Text of the Agriculture (Miscellaneous Provisions) Act 1968 as in force today (including any amendments) within the United Kingdom, from legislation.gov.uk.

Agriculture (Miscellaneous Provisions) Act 1972 (Note: Section 27(1).)
- Act of Parliament
- Parliament of the United Kingdom
- Long title: An Act to make new provision for the prevention of diseases suffered or disseminated by animals and to amend the Diseases of Animals Act 1950; to amend the law relating to slaughterhouses, to the slaughter of animals in Scotland and to the improvement of live stock; to amend Part II of the Agriculture Act 1967; to make new provision in relation to the Agricultural Marketing Fund and the Agricultural Marketing (Scotland) Fund; to increase the amount which may be advanced under section 2 of the Agriculture Mortgage Corporation Act 1956; to increase the penalties under the Agriculture (Poisonous Substances) Act 1952 and the Agriculture (Safety, Health and Welfare Provisions) Act 1956; to make new provision with respect to arbitrations under the Agricultural Holdings Act 1948; to amend the Cereals Marketing Act 1965; to amend the Corn Returns Act 1882 and the Corn Sales Act 1921; to make new provision for obtaining agricultural statistics; to make further provision as to the use of poison against grey squirrels or coypus; to clarify the Plant Health Act 1967 as respects the recovery of expenses incurred by an authority exercising default powers under orders made by virtue of that Act; to abolish agricultural executive committees and certain other committees having functions in relation to agriculture or apiculture; to confer powers on the Secretary of State in relation to certain parks and other land in Scotland; to repeal paragraph (f) of Case 14 in Schedule 3 to the Rent Act 1968 and paragraph (f) of Case 15 in Schedule 3 to the Rent (Scotland) Act 1971; and for purposes connected with those matters.
- Citation: 1972 c. 62
- Territorial extent: England and Wales (in part); Scotland (in part); Northern Ireland (in part)); (Note: Section 27(4)–(5).)

Dates
- Royal assent: 9 August 1972
- Commencement: various (Note: Section 27(2)–(3).)
Other legislation
Amends	Corn Returns Act 1882; Corn Sales Act 1921; Agricultural Holdings Act 1948; Prevention of Damage by Pests Act 1949; Diseases of Animals Act 1950; Agriculture (Poisonous Substances) Act 1952; Agriculture Mortgage Corporation Act 1956; Agriculture (Safety, Health and Welfare Provisions) Act 1956; London Government Act 1963; Cereals Marketing Act 1965; Agriculture Act 1967; Plant Health Act 1967; Rent Act 1968; Rent (Scotland) Act 1971
Amended by	Slaughterhouses Act 1974; House of Commons Disqualification Act 1975; Rent Act 1977; Agricultural Statistics Act 1979; Slaughter of Animals (Scotland) Act 1980; Food Safety Act 1990; Statute Law (Repeals) Act 2004

Status: Amended

Text of statute as originally enacted

Text of the Agriculture (Miscellaneous Provisions) Act 1972 as in force today (including any amendments) within the United Kingdom, from legislation.gov.uk.

There were many other changes in the law, and each of these acts needed negotiation between the Ministry of Agriculture and the National Farmers Union (NFU) to fix the support price to be paid for each agricultural product. They were enacted in a series of acts: the Agriculture (Miscellaneous Provisions) Act 1943 (6 & 7 Geo. 6. c. 16), the Agriculture (Miscellaneous Provisions) Act 1954 (2 & 3 Eliz. 2. c. 39), the Agriculture (Miscellaneous Provisions) Act 1963 (c. 11), the Agriculture (Miscellaneous Provisions) Act 1968 (c. 34) and the Agriculture (Miscellaneous Provisions) Act 1972 (c. 62).

Agriculture (Miscellaneous Provisions) Act 1976 (Note: Section 27(1).)
- Act of Parliament
- Parliament of the United Kingdom
- Long title: An Act to dissolve the Sugar Board; to provide for increasing the amount which may be advanced under section 2 of the Agricultural Mortgage Corporation Act 1956; to amend the provisions of Part I of the Agriculture Act 1967 relating to the Meat and Livestock Commission and their committees; to provide for the making of grants in connection with proficiency tests in crafts related to agriculture; to authorise measures to restrict the growing of male hop plants; to make further provision for obtaining agricultural statistics; to provide for the adaptation of certain enactments to metric units; to provide for regulating the exportation of animals in the interests of their welfare; to make further provision for preventing the transmission of disease from wild life to animals and poultry; to amend the law relating to agricultural holdings; to amend section 29(4) of the Agriculture Act 1970; and for purposes connected with those matters.
- Citation: 1976 c. 55
- Territorial extent: England and Wales (in part); Scotland (in part); Northern Ireland (in part)); (Note: Section 27(5)–(6).)

Dates
- Royal assent: 15 November 1976
- Commencement: various (Note: Section 27(2)–(4).)
Other legislation
Amends	Agricultural Mortgage Corporation Act 1956; Agriculture Act 1967; Agriculture Act 1970
Amended by	Agricultural Holdings (Notices to Quit) Act 1977; Agricultural Statistics Act 1979; Statute Law (Repeals) Act 1981; Agricultural Holdings Act 1986; Statute Law (Repeals) Act 1986; Agricultural Holdings (Scotland) Act 1991; Water Consolidation (Consequential Provisions) Act 1991; Statute Law (Repeals) Act 2004

Status: Amended

Text of statute as originally enacted

Text of the Agriculture (Miscellaneous Provisions) Act 1976 as in force today (including any amendments) within the United Kingdom, from legislation.gov.uk.

The Agriculture (Miscellaneous Provisions) Act 1976 (c. 55) was passed as the price of Plaid Cymru's support in Parliament for the Lib-Lab Pact of 1976. The 1976 act allowed for succession of agricultural tenancies on a farmer's death. A suitable relative could inherit the tenancy. This was limited to two generations of tenant.

On government instructions, the Northfield Committee began to review the country's agricultural system in 1977. It did not report until July 1979. The report influenced ongoing discussions between the NFU and the Country Landowners Association (CLA), who were trying to reach an agreement on legislation that could be presented as having industry-wide support. In 1984, in accordance with the agreement they did reach, succession was extended to the retirement of the tenant, but no new tenancies from 1984 were to include succession rights.

==== 1985–2000 ====
Agriculture Act 1986 (Note: Section 24(1).)
- Act of Parliament
- Parliament of the United Kingdom
- Long title: An Act to make further provision relating to agriculture and agricultural and other food products, horticulture and the countryside; and for connected matters.
- Citation: 1986 c. 49
- Territorial extent: England and Wales (in part); Scotland (in part); Northern Ireland (in part)); (Note: Section 24(4)–(7).)

Dates
- Royal assent: 25 July 1986
- Commencement: various (Note: Section 24(2)–(3).)
Other legislation
Amends	Plant Varieties and Seeds Act 1964
Amended by	Agricultural Holdings (Scotland) Act 1991; Water Consolidation (Consequential Provisions) Act 1991; Countryside and Rights of Way Act 2000; Statute Law (Repeals) Act 2004; Public Bodies (Abolition of Food from Britain) Order 2014

Status: Amended

Text of statute as originally enacted

Text of the Agriculture Act 1986 as in force today (including any amendments) within the United Kingdom, from legislation.gov.uk.

By this time the then-European Economic Community (EEC, now the European Community)'s Common Agricultural Policy and the value of the green pound was having a direct impact on farming. The Agriculture Act 1986 (c. 49) was concerned with the value of the milk quota attached to land, and particularly how it ought to be shared between landlord and tenant. Nowadays, milk quotas no longer exist, but other subsidies (largely rolled up into 'single payments') still must be divided between the parties.

The UK's egg-laying flock declined between 1970 and 2000. It fell by 5.5% in one year from June 1999 to May 2000. In 1971, there were 125,258 farms with egg-laying hens and by 1999 this was down to 26,500.

From 1992 until 2004, or 2006 for organic farms, there were subsidies for not growing any crops at all. This was called set-aside and resulted from EEC farming policies. From 2007 onwards, set aside subsidies in the UK were withdrawn.

=== 2000–2015 ===
In 2009, 3,133,000 hectares (7,740,000 acres) of cereal crops were sown in the UK. There were 581,000 hectares (1,440,000 acres) of oil seed rape, 233,000 hectares (580,000 acres) of peas and beans, 149,000 hectares (370,000 acres) of potatoes, and 116,000 hectares (290,000 acres) of sugar beet. Winter crops tend to be planted around mid-September, and spring crops as soon as the soil is ready. Each year the country produces about 6.5 million tonnes of barley, of which 1.5 million are exported, 2 million used in brewing and distilling activities and the remainder fed to livestock. The country also produces 14 to 15 million tons of wheat each year, of which farmers kept 3.9 million tonnes as stock in February 2012. In 2008, 750,000 tonnes of oats were produced, in 2011–2012 613,000.

During 1999–2003 production of barley ranged from 6,128,000 to 7,456,000, wheat from 11,580,000 to 16,704,000 and oats from 491,000 to 753,000.

==== Pastoral farming ====
Most farmers of beef cattle or sheep made a net loss in the year to April 2010. Production, veterinary, bedding, property, power and machinery costs all underwent double-digit rises in percentage terms, meaning that the losses in the year to April 2010 increased over 2009 losses by over £30/animal. However, wheat exports were much stronger than the previous year.

In 2011, earnings were £30,900 per full-time person, which represented an increase of 24% from 2010 values in real terms. This was the best performance in UK agriculture since the 1990s. Agriculture employed 476,000 people, representing 1.5% of the workforce, down more than 32% since 1996. In terms of gross value added in 2009, 83% of the UK's agricultural income originated from England, 9% from Scotland, 4% from Northern Ireland and 3% from Wales.

In 2012 the top ten agricultural products of the United Kingdom by value, as reported by the Food and Agriculture Organization in 2012 were (in metric tons): milk (13.8 M); wheat (13.2 M); Chicken meat (1.4 M); cattle meat (882,000); pig meat (770,000); sheep meat (770,000); potatoes (4.5 M); rapeseed (2.5 M); hen eggs (630,000); sugar beet (7.2 M).

==== Arable farming ====
In 2014, total income from farming in the United Kingdom was £5.38 billion, representing about 0.7% of the British national value added in that year.

From 2002 to 2003, of the cereals grown, 31% of barley, 36% of oats and 34% of wheat were used for human consumption. Consumption of oats by the human population compared with livestock was proportionally higher in the UK than in European countries, 455,000 tonnes as forecast by farm officials during 2012. 163,000 tonnes were fed to livestock during 2011–2012.

Two of the most serious diseases affecting crop plants were colony collapse disorder (CCD), wiping out honeybee colonies worldwide, and varroa destructor, a parasitic mite affecting honeybees. Honeybees pollinated 80% of plants worldwide. In 2007, up to 80% of the bee colonies in some areas were wiped out. Honeybees pollinated crops worth about £200 million a year, and their total contribution to the economy might have been as high as £1 billion.

== Government ==
The Board of Agriculture was established by the Board of Agriculture Act 1889 (52 & 53 Vict. c. 30). The Board of Agriculture for Scotland was created under the Secretary of State for Scotland by the Small Landholders (Scotland) Act 1911 (1 & 2 Geo. 5. c. 49). In England and Wales, the Ministry of Agriculture and Fisheries Act 1919 (9 & 10 Geo. 5. c. 91) replaced the Board of Agriculture and Fisheries by the Ministry of Agriculture and Fisheries, which later became the Ministry of Agriculture, Fisheries and Food (MAFF). MAFF was the predecessor of the Department for Environment, Food and Rural Affairs, DEFRA.

DEFRA as at 2024 operates in England. Scotland's agriculture is controlled by the Scottish Government and its Agriculture and Rural Economy Directorate. The Welsh government also controls agriculture as a devolved matter under the aegis of the Minister for Rural Affairs. Northern Irish agriculture is within the control of the Department of Agriculture, Environment and Rural Affairs (DAERA) which is part of the Northern Ireland Executive.

=== England ===
The Environment, Food and Rural Affairs Committee (EFRA) of the Westminster Parliament's House of Commons is tasked to oversee and enquire into the policy, administration and spending of DEFRA. It conducts its own inquiries usually leading to published Reports. EFRA may also inquire into matters that do not lead to formal reports, and it is empowered to conduct interviews and take evidence.

=== Wales ===
The Economy, Trade, and Rural Affairs Committee of the Welsh Parliament supervises the Welsh Government in respect of animal welfare, environment, agriculture, forestry, food, marine resources and fisheries as well as trade and economy.

=== Scotland ===
The supervising bodies of the Scottish Parliament include the Rural Economy and Connectivity Committee with oversight of agriculture and forestry, and the Rural Affairs and Islands Committee responsible for land use, food, animal welfare and fisheries.

=== Northern Ireland ===
The Committee for Agriculture, Environment and Rural Affairs of the Northern Ireland Assembly is tasked to advise and assist the DAERA Minister and operates in accordance with its mandate periods.

== Subsidies ==
When in the EU, UK farmers received more than £3 billion a year via the Single Farm Payment. This is roughly £28,300 per farm, although this includes around £3,000 of environmental subsidies, such as for planting woodland. Following Brexit a new subsidy scheme is being introduced with a proposed reduction in direct payments with an increase in payments tied to specific environmental or developmental criteria.

== Emissions ==
DEFRA's Agri-climate Report 2022 states that agriculture is a major contributor to UK nitrous oxide (69%) and methane (48%) emissions. It contributes 1.7% to UK CO_{2} emissions. Levels have been steady since the early 2000s when a 16% drop was achieved from the 1990s. A study of farmer awareness of mitigation measures indicates that barriers to mitigation practices include lack of information, the belief change is not necessary and financial barriers.

== Land ==
The Utilised Agricultural Area (UAA), as of 2022, was 41.619 million acres (16.843 million hectares), approximately 69% of the land area of the UK. This amount was down 2.2% from 2021. The UAA encompasses land used for agricultural purposes, including all arable and horticultural crops, uncropped arable land, common rough grazing, temporary and permanent grassland and land used for outdoor pigs. It excludes woodland and other non-agricultural land.

Approximately 36% of the land is croppable (arable), or approximately 25% of the total UK land area. Most of the rest is permanent grassland, rough grazing and other land on agricultural holdings.

=== Agricultural Land Classification ===
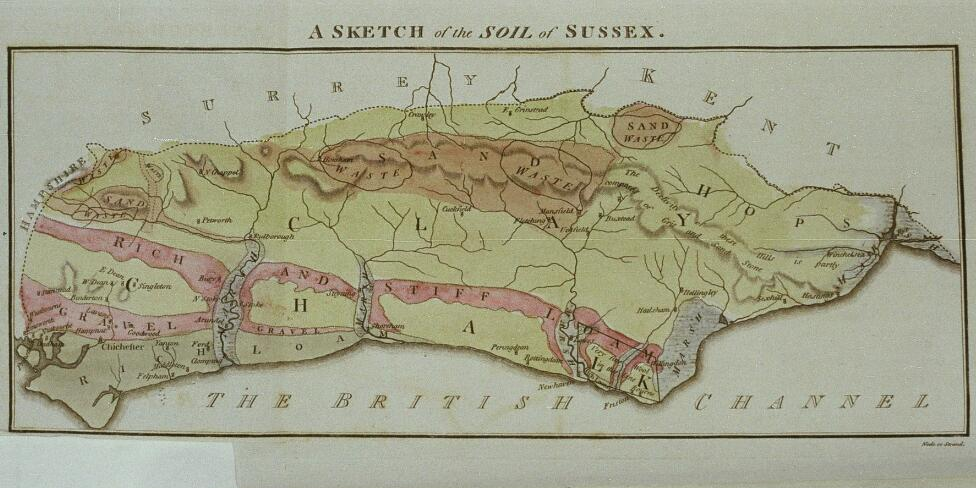
Before Agricultural Land Classification systems, agricultural land was mapped by descriptions that would aid farming. Here is a 1793 map describing Sussex by the noted agriculturalist and writer Arthur Young.

Land classification maps were issued first in the 1960s, intended as a tool for the better siting of planned new towns. They were provisional in contents but in fact were not updated. Areas of under 80 hectares were stated not to be identifiable from these maps, which were reissued in the 1980s at a different scale (1:250,000 or one quarter inch to the mile). The British Society of Soil Science has published a guide to the history and mapping of UK land classifications.

==== Grades of land ====
Land is classified in England and Wales in accordance with five grades. These grades are established using information as to soil quality and characteristics together with climatological data. The grades used are:

- Grade 1: Excellent quality agricultural land
- Grade 2: Good quality agricultural land
- Grade 3a: Good to moderate quality agricultural land
- Grade 3b: Moderate quality agricultural land
- Grade 4: Poor quality agricultural land
- Grade 5: Very poor quality agricultural land

The planning system requires permission for many kinds of development. Superior grades of agricultural land, meaning grades 1-3a inclusive, are less likely to be permitted to be developed and so fall out of agricultural use. These superior grades of land are the subject of a separate set of maps (Likelihood of Best and Most Versatile (BMV) Agricultural Land - Strategic scale maps) for strategic planning purposes only for the English regions, also available online from Natural England.

Sale or letting of land may use the land classification to price the land. Setting rents or evaluating dilapidations (disrepair or breach of obligation on tenanted farms) will probably include reference to this information.

Land restoration projects for contaminated land will use such information.

Road surveys for building or extending highways will require to include land classification information.

==== England and Wales ====
Agricultural Land Classification maps are available by online download for England and Wales from Natural England. The English regions have individual maps for: London and the South East; the Eastern Region; the East Midlands; the West Midlands; Yorkshire and Humber; the North East; the North West; the South West. Revised criteria for land grading dated 1988 are provided at the same site, together with climatological data used for the purpose of mapping, and soil sample data with a glossary. The Welsh government, in applying the same grading system, offers predictive map guidance online so that it is easier to decide whether an individual land survey is required to establish the grading of the land. For Wales, the Land Quality Advice Service is the responsible agency.

==== Scotland ====
Scotland uses its own classification system for Land Capability for Agriculture (LCA). It has seven Classes which subdivide. The Prime Quality Land is in Classes 1–3.1 inclusive, corresponding to the superior grades 1–3a in the English/Welsh system. Downloadable data and maps are available from the Scottish Government online. Scottish planning policy may require superior grades of land and peatland to be identified.

==== Northern Ireland ====
There are no Agricultural Land Classification maps, but the system reflects the same grading and criteria as for England and Wales. Grade 3 is designated into 3A and 3B (capitalisation deliberate). There are published soil maps. The Agri-Food and Business Sciences Institute (AFBI) has created publications with data specific to Northern Ireland in the form of soil surveys, geo-chemical data and soil maps.

=== Soil ===
==== Background ====
Soil is a mix of mineral and organic components, produced when rock is weathered and acted on by living organisms. If soils are acidic they may need repeated applications of alkalines (such as lime) to remain fertile. Acid rain increases soil acidity, but even normal rain may be slightly acid. In freely-drained areas, soil base material (including dissolved nitrites) may be washed away, leaving higher concentrations of organic acids in the ground. Wet soil results where rainfall exceeds the rate of evaporation.

==== Soil in Britain ====
Most British soils are 2% to 5% organic and 95% to 98% mineral, but soils such as peat may contain up to 50% organic matter. As far south as the Thames Valley, the soil has been heavily glaciated, which ground down the rock and redistributed the resulting matter. Most British soils date from the last Ice Age and are comparatively young, but in level areas, and particularly south of the Thames Valley, there are older soils.

Soffe (2003) summarises the acidity of British soils as follows:

Land type	pH
Sandy heath land	3.5–5.0
Calcareous (chalky) brown soil	6.5–8.0
Upland peat	3.5–4.5
Cultivated soil, non-calcareous	5.0–7.0
Cultivated soil, calcareous	7.0–8.0
Permanent pasture, lowland	5.0–6.0
Permanent pasture, upland	4.5–5.5
Lowland peat	4.0–7.0

==== Government information or advice regarding soils ====
Aside from the information above under Agricultural Land Classification, DEFRA has published a Soil Code. There is also a Construction Code of Practice for the Sustainable Use of Soils on Construction Sites. The latter was under review as at August 2022.

Guidance is also available in DEFRA's Good Practice for Handling Soils (2000) and its Guidance for Successful Reclamation of Mineral and Waste Sites (2005).

==== Traditional farming ====
Owing to high rainfall in the UK, less well drained areas may become waterlogged. Wet land is more difficult to work and crops grow less well. Field drains were traditionally open ditches, but covered pipes have been used in more modern times. Earthworms are important for creating small drainage channels in the soil and for helping to move soil particles.

Lime counteracts soil acidity. With fine particulate soils such as clays, lime also encourages the formation of a better soil structure that will aerate and help with drainage. Its benefits have been known, if not scientifically understood, since Roman times.

If organic matter poor in nitrogen but rich in carbohydrate is added to soil, nitrogen is assimilated and fixed. Fertility increases while land is under grass, which helps to accumulate organic matter in the soil. These factors mean that soil is traditionally improved by means of liming, draining, and allowing to lie fallow. It is traditionally fertilised with manure, nitrogen, phosphates, and potash.

=== Fertilisers ===
Nitrogen stimulates plant growth, but over-application softens the plant tissues, making them more vulnerable to pests and disease, and less resistant to frost. Nitrogen may be added by using slurry, by nitrogen-fixing crops or by artificial fertilisers. The negative side-effects of adding nitrogen are mitigated by phosphates. The risk of excess nitrogen polluting water is the focus of designating Nitrate Vulnerable Zones.

==== Slurry ====
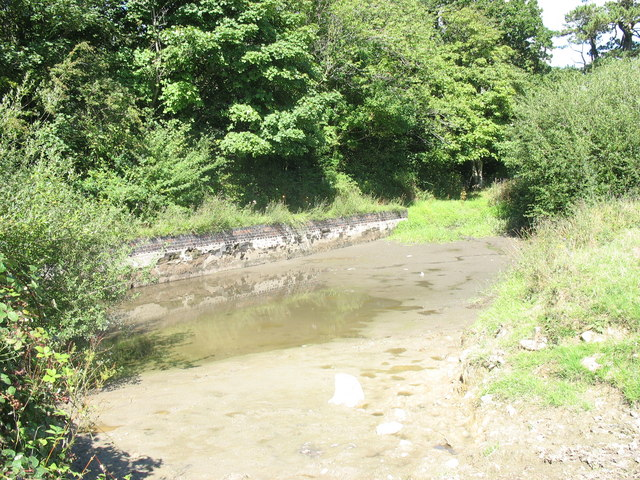
An unfenced slurry pit without infrastructure to contain or cover the slurry. Uncovered storage releases atmospheric pollution.

170 million tonnes of animal excreta ("slurry") is produced annually in the UK.

Farmyard manure can be used as soil fertiliser. Urine contains about half the nitrogen and most of the potash that an animal voids. Dung contains the other half of the nitrogen and most of the phosphoric acid and lime. With dung, much of the nitrogen is lost in storage or locked up in slowly released forms, so greater quantities are necessary compared to artificial fertilisers. Manure is most effective when ploughed into the fields while it is still fresh, but this is not practical while crops are growing. In practice, most manure is stored and then applied in winter, or else added in ridges for root crops.

Slurry can pollute watercourses, draining them of oxygen, can contain pathogenic microorganisms such as salmonella, and creates an odour that causes complaints if stored near people. Pigs and poultry, if kept intensively with a relatively small land area per animal, create manure that requires to be processed. This may be done by removing the liquid component and transporting it away, or by composting it, or by anaerobic digestion to produce methane which is later converted to electricity.

Slurry lagoons that are open are polluting infrastructure. New grants as of 2022 will pay towards conversion of stores to closed stores with minimum 6 months storage. Acidification treatment or covers will be required under the scheme. Many existing stores are concrete or steel structures.

==== Nitrogen fixers ====
Leguminous plants such as peas, beans or lucerne live in a symbiotic relationship with certain bacteria that produce nodules on their roots. The bacteria extract nitrogen from the air and convert it to nitrogenating compounds that benefit the legume. When the legume dies or is harvested, its rotting roots add nitrogen compounds to the soil.

==== Nitrate Vulnerable Zones (NVZ) ====
Where nitrogen from soil gets into the water, it can be hazardous to human health. EC Directive 80/778/EEC and 91/676/EEC both state a ceiling acceptable level of nitrates of 50 mg/litre, which is also the level recommended by the World Health Organization. In several places in Britain, particularly in the Midlands and the South East, nitrate concentrations occasionally exceed this level and the government has brought in regulations to control nitrate levels in the water. The regulations governing designated Nitrate Vulnerable Zones (NVZ) aim to protect ground and surface water from contamination with nitrates and manure. Around 68% of English farmland, 14% of Scottish farmland and all of Welsh farmland is within a NVZ. The NVZ rules control at what time of year farmers may apply nitrogen or manure to the land and oblige them to keep strict records of nitrogen-containing substances used. They also regulate slurry and manure storage.

The Welsh Government introduced an all Wales NVZ in 2021. Previously, 2.4% of Wales' land was designated as a NVZ. Environmental and fishing groups welcomed the new rules. It will be rolled out, pending a review by the Senedd, over the next three years. The review came after major political backlash from opposition parties and farmers.

==== Phosphates ====
Phosphates are substances that contain phosphorus, which stimulates root development in young plants. It also increases yields and speeds up plant growth. Phosphates are not easily lost from soil, but mostly occur in stable forms that are not liberated quickly enough by natural processes, so fertilisation is necessary. Traditionally, phosphate-bearing materials added to soil include bonemeal, powdered slag, and seaweed.

==== Potash ====
Potash is a substance that contains potassium. This promotes disease resistance and helps to build starches and sugars. Plants tend to absorb potash during early stages of growth, and potash may reduce problems caused by applying nitrogen. Potash also increases the weight of an individual cereal grain. Traditional potash sources included applying ash to the land and ploughing in crop residues after the harvest. Artificial potash fertilisers were not used until deposits of potash salts were discovered in Germany in 1861.

== Arable farming ==
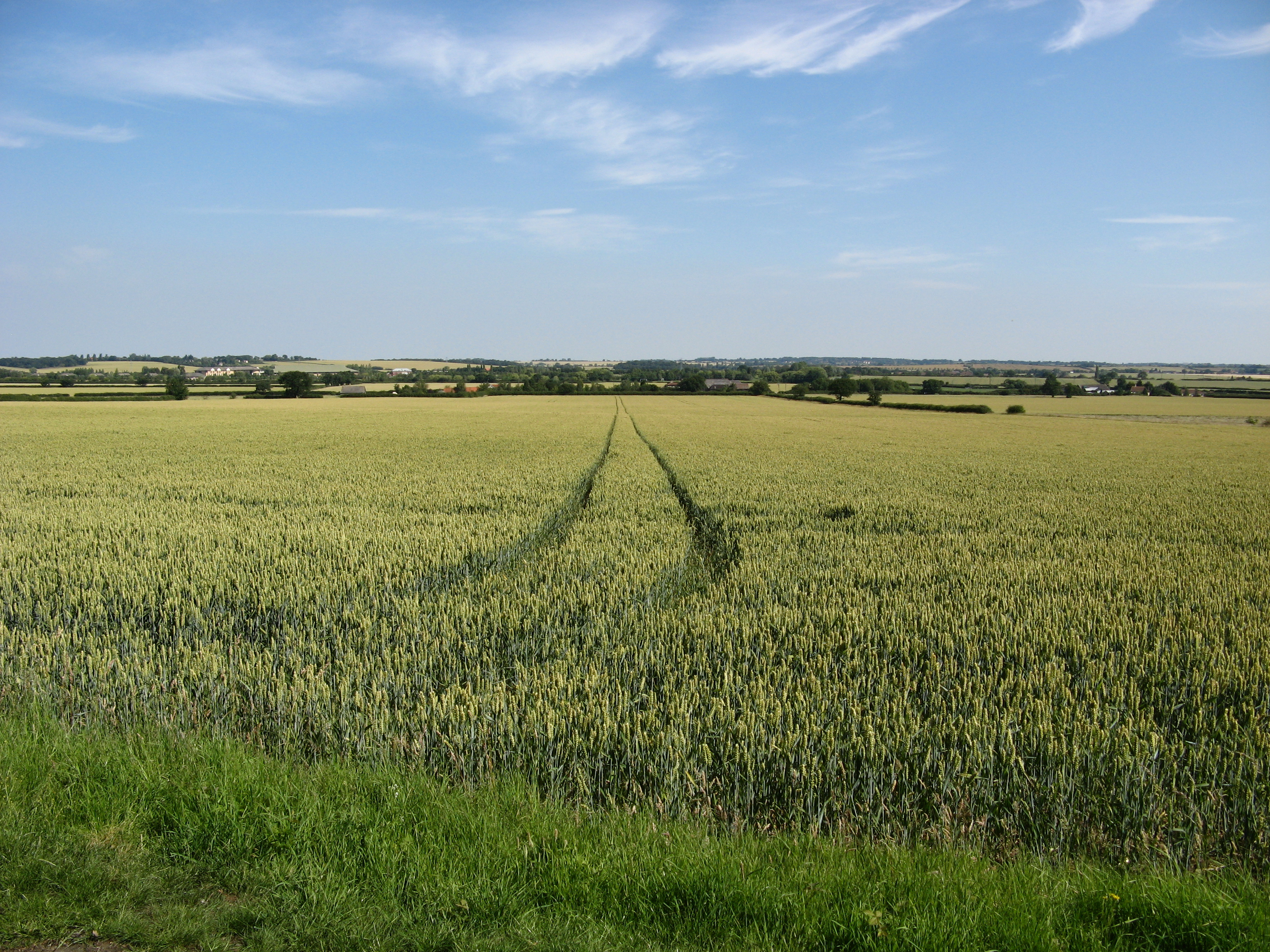
A wheat field in Essex

Arable farming is the production of crops. Crop growth is affected by light, soil, nutrients, water, air, and climate. Crops commonly grown in the United Kingdom include cereals, chiefly wheat, oats and barley; root vegetables, chiefly potatoes and sugar beet; pulse crops such as beans or peas; forage crops such as cabbages, vetches, rape and kale; fruit, particularly apples and pears; and hay for animal feed.

Seeds may be sown in spring, summer or autumn. Spring-sown crops are vulnerable to drought in May or June. Autumn sowing is usually restricted to frost-hardy types of bean, vetch, or cereal such as winter wheat. Traditional sowing techniques include broadcasting, dibbling, drilling, and ploughing in. Drilling is normally the most economical technique where conditions are dry enough.

Climate change will have positive impacts on crop production in Ireland. The combined effects of higher CO_{2} concentration, warmer spring/summer temperatures and lengthened growing season will all be beneficial to certain types of crop production, specifically grains and barley and detrimental to other crops, such as potatoes.

=== Methods ===
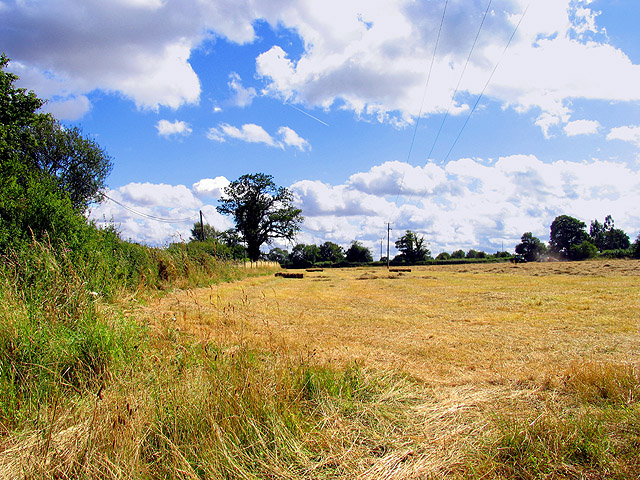
Haymaking near Greenham

Ploughing is not always regarded as essential nowadays, but the plough can improve soil by inverting it to improve soil aeration and drainage, release nutrients through weathering, and expose harmful pests to predators. It is also an effective method of weed control. Ploughing depth in Britain varies between 5–6 inches in some limestone regions to up to 18 inches in deep stoneless silt land. Most British ploughs are designed to turn a furrow of up to about a foot deep, which is relatively shallow compared to some other countries, where furrows of up to 16 inches are common. Other machines used to prepare land include cultivators (to break up land too heavy for a normal plough), harrows (to level the surface of ploughed land), rolls or rollers (used for firming the soil), sprayers and dusters (used to spread herbicides, fungicides, insecticides and fertilisers).

Reaping is the process of harvesting a crop. Traditionally reaping was done with the scythe and reaping hook, but in Britain these have been entirely superseded by machinery. Combine harvesters, so called because they both harvest and thresh the crop, are common. Other machines used include mowers, reapers, binders, harvesters, pea cutters and flax pullers. Once reaped, some crops are brought directly to market. Others need to be threshed to separate the cash crop from the straw and chaff. Wheat, oats, barley, beans and some kinds of small seed (e.g. clover) typically need to be threshed.

Since the Second World War, scientific and technical progress and the removal of tenancy-based restrictions on choice of crop have given British arable farmers a great deal more freedom to plan cropping sequences. Strict crop rotation is no longer technically necessary or even financially desirable. Factors that influence crop sequences include the soil type, weather, the price and availability of labour and power, market outlets, and technical considerations about maintaining soil fertility and crop health. For example, some vigorous crops such as kale or arable silage will, when liberally fertilised, tend to outgrow and smother weeds. Many pests and diseases are crop-specific and the more often a particular crop is taken, the greater the buildup of pests and diseases that attack it. The farmer will therefore try to design a sequence to sustain high yields, permit adequate weed control, service market needs, and keep the soil free from diseases and pests.

As a direct result of climate change, harvesting is coming earlier in the year. The increased temperatures and CO_{2} levels allow this to happen. This means crops can be harvested well in advance of the heavy rain season.

=== Diseases ===
Most diseases of crop plants result from fungus spores that may live in the soil and enter through roots, be airborne and enter the plant through damaged areas or landing on leaf surfaces, or are spread by pests. These spores tend to affect photosynthesis and reduce chlorophyll. They often make plants look yellow and affect growth and marketability of the crop. They are most commonly treated with fungicides, and may be called mildews, rusts, blotches, scabs, wilts, rots or blights. European Union regulations on pesticides are changing, and several important pesticides currently in use will no longer be available. This has potentially quite serious implications for British agriculture.

Climate change is bringing with it the earlier onset of winter rain. These very wet soils during spring time will also lead to unwanted pest and disease problems during the plating season.

=== Weeds ===
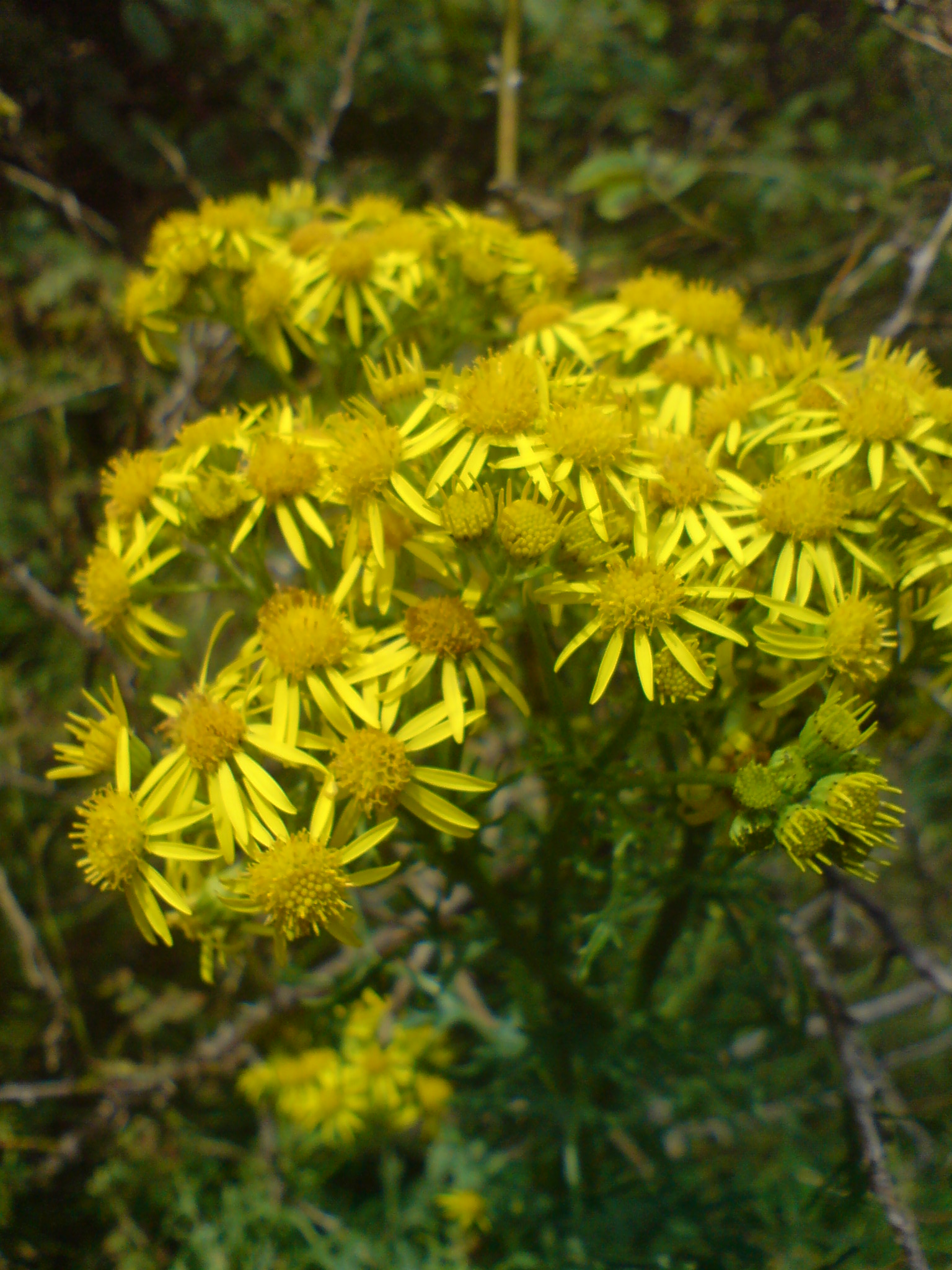
Common ragwort growing in Scotland. Ragwort is a problem weed throughout the UK.

Historically weed control was by hand-pulling of weeds, often during "fallowing" (which means leaving the land to carry no crop for a season, during which time the weeds can be found and removed). In 1896 it was found that a copper sulphate solution would kill broad-leaved weeds without seriously damaging young cereal plants. Other chemical weedkillers were soon discovered and now common chemical weedkiller ingredients include sodium chlorate, copper chloride, sulphuric acid, dinitroorthocresol and dinitrobutylphenol. Hormone-based weedkillers are used to kill weeds more selectively. Although most weeds are vulnerable to at least one of these substances, eradicating all the weeds from a particular area will usually need several different weedkillers. The use of pesticides has declined, and British farmers now use about a third less pesticides than they did in 1983. The crop needing most pesticides is wheat.

Table of significant crop weeds
Common name	Latin name	Crops affected
Barren brome	Anisantha sterilis	Cereals
Black bindweed	Polygonum persicaria	Broad-leaved crops
Blackgrass	Alopecurus myosuroides	Winter cereals
Bracken	Pteridium aquilinum	Upland and hill grassland
Buttercups	Ranunculus spp.	Grassland
Charlock	Sinapis arvensis	Broad-leaved crops
Chickweed	Stellaria media	Broad-leaved crops
Cleavers	Galium aparine	Broad-leaved crops
Corn marigold	Chrysanthemum segetum	Cereals
Couch	Elytrigia repens spp.	Grassland
Docks	Rumex spp.	Grassland
Dove's-foot cranesbill	Geranium molle	Broad-leaved crops
Fat hen	Chenopodium album	Broad-leaved crops
Hemp nettle	Galeopsis spp.	Broad-leaved crops
Japanese knotweed	Reynoutria japonica	Grassland
Knotgrass	Polygonum aviculare	Broad-leaved crops
Mayweeds	Matricaria spp.; Anthemis spp.	Broad-leaved crops; cereals
Mouse-eared chickweed	Cerastium fontanum	Grassland
Redshank	Polygonum persicaria	Broad-leaved crops
Rushes	Juncus spp.	Wet grassland
Speedwell	Veronica persica	Broad-leaved crops
Spurrey	Spergula arvensis	Broad-leaved crops
Thistles	Cirsium spp.	Grassland
Wild oats	Avena fatua	Spring cereals
Winter wild oats	Avena ludoviciana	Winter cereals

Key
Perennial weeds
Annual grass weeds
Annual broad-leaved weeds

==== Use of pesticides ====
In Scotland there is a code of practice, the Pesticides: code of practice for using plant protection products in Scotland (2007).

=== Pests ===
A pest is an animal that eats or spoils food meant for humans. Pests damage crops by removing leaf area, severing roots, or simply gross damage. In the UK, they are invertebrates (chiefly nematodes, slugs and insects or insect larvae), mammals (particularly rabbits) and birds (mainly members of the pigeon family). The damage caused by crop pests is considerable. For example, potato cyst nematodes cause over £50 million damage a year in the UK.

Table of important crop pests
Common name	Latin name	Crops affected
Frit fly	Oscinella frit	Cereals, forage grasses
Wheat bulb fly	Delia coarctata	Cereals
Aphids	Sitobion avenae; Rhopalosiphum padi	Cereals
Cereal cyst nematode	Heterodera avenae	Cereals
Peach-potato aphid	Myzus persicae	Potatoes, sugar beet
Potato cyst nematode	Globodera rostochiensis and G. pallida	Potatoes
Slug	Deroceras reticulatum	Brassicas
Pigeon	Columba palumbus	Brassicas
Flea beetle	Phyllotreta spp.	Brassicas
Cabbage stem flea beetle	Psylliodes chrysocephala	Brassicas
Pollen beetle	Meligethes spp.	Brassicas
Cabbage caterpillar	Various spp.	Brassicas
Millipede	Various spp.	Sugar beet
Springtail	Onychiurus spp.	Sugar beet
Symphylid	Scutigerella immaculata	Sugar beet
Beet flea beetle	Chaetocnema concinna	Sugar beet
Black bean aphid	Aphis fabae	Sugar beet, peas and beans
Beet cyst nematode	Heterodera schachtii	Sugar beet
Pea cyst nematode	Heterodera goettingiana	Peas and beans
Pea and bean weevil	Sitona lineatus	Peas and beans
Pea aphid	Acyrthosiphum pisum	Peas and beans
Pea moth	Cydia nigricana	Peas and beans
Pea midge	Contarinia pisi	Peas and beans
Bean seed fly	Delia platura	Peas and beans
Carrot fly	Psila rosea	Carrots
Willow-carrot aphid	Cavariella aegopodii	Carrots
Onion fly	Delia antiqua	Onions
Stem and bulb nematode	Ditylenchus dipsaci	Onions
Weevils	Sitona spp.	Forage grasses
Ryegrass mosaic virus	Spread by the mite Abacarus hystrix	Forage grasses
Clover stem nematode	Ditylenchus dipsaci	Clover plants
Rabbit	Oryctolagus cuniculus	Any plant

==== Ministerial intervention powers ====
The Secretary of State for DEFRA can, under section 98 of the Agriculture Act 1947, intervene to compel or assist with pest control by destruction of animals, birds and eggs specified in a notice. Such animal pests are defined as "rabbits, hares and other rodents, deer, foxes and moles". Birds are defined for these purposes as wild birds other than those included in the first schedule to the Protection of Birds Act 1954. The Secretary of State may assist in the process of pest extermination by providing equipment or services and recoup the reasonable cost of doing so.

Actions prohibited by the Game Act 1831 (1 & 2 Will. 4. c. 32) are not authorised by a notice under the Agriculture Act 1947. As of 2026 the Game Act 1831 remains in force. It prohibits, amongst other things, taking game at certain times and also the laying down of poison for game.

== Livestock farming ==
Pastoral farming is the breeding of livestock for meat, wool, eggs and milk, and historically (in the UK) for labour. Livestock products are the main element of the UK's agricultural output. The most common meat animals in the United Kingdom are cattle, pigs, sheep and poultry. Overwhelmingly, British wool comes from sheep, with only a few goats or alpacas bred for exotic wools such as cashmere or angora. The vast majority of milk comes from cattle, and eggs from chickens.

Most British farm animals are bred for a particular purpose, so for example, there is a sharp division between cattle bred for the beef trade—early-maturing cattle are best to increase yield, and those that store fat marbled within the muscle rather than as layers outside are preferred for the flavour—and those bred for dairy, where animals with a high milk yield are strongly preferred. Nevertheless, because dairy cattle must calve to produce milk, much of the British beef output is from surplus dairy herd calves.

=== Cattle farming ===
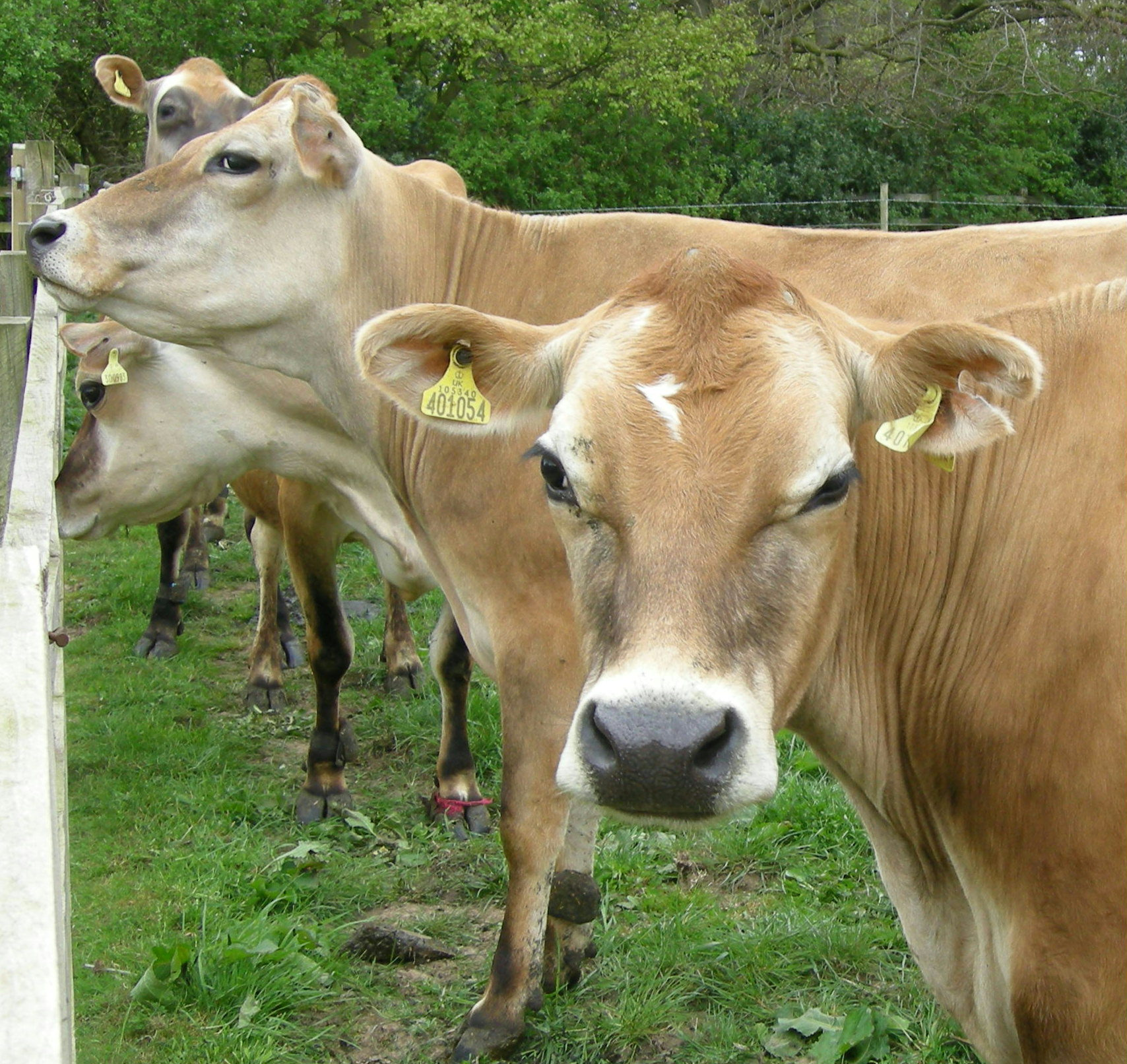
Jersey cattle

There are about 17,000 dairy farms in the UK, largely in the west. Average herd size is 86 cows in England, 75 in Wales and 102 in Scotland. Most cows are milked twice a day, and an average dairy cow yields 6,300 litres a year. The most important dairy cattle breed is the ubiquitous British Friesian, which has largely replaced the Dairy Shorthorn in British dairy herds thanks both to its high milk yield and the relatively high quality of the beef it produces.

The UK once produced roughly as much beef as it ate, but this changed in 1996 because of bovine spongiform encephalopathy (BSE). The BSE crisis led to regulations preventing animals more than 30 months old from entering the food chain, which meant cull cows could no longer be sold for beef. Just under 6 million cattle over this age were destroyed. A Calf Purchase Aid Scheme, under which a further nearly 2 million calves were slaughtered, ended in 1999. In 2002, the UK produced 72% of the beef it ate. Important beef cattle breeds include the Hereford, which is the most popular British beef breed, and the Aberdeen Angus. The once-widespread Beef Shorthorn is now a relatively uncommon sight.

Cows require significant areas of grassland to raise. Dairy cows need 0.4 to 0.5 hectares per cow, including the area needed for winter silage; suckler beef cows can need up to a whole hectare each. The UK produces very little veal. UK animal welfare law requires that animals are kept in daylight in groups with bedding and access to hay, silage or straw. This produces "pink" veal where the calves grow more slowly. It was initially less desirable to some continental customers than the "white" veal produced in harsher conditions for the calf.

=== Sheep farming ===
Over 41,000 farms in the UK produce sheep, but more than half of breeding ewes are on hill or upland farms suitable for little else. National Parks and heather moors such as the Lake District, the Pennines and Snowdonia in Wales are dominated by sheep farms, as are the Scottish Highlands. In the lowlands, pockets of sheep farms remain. Romney Marsh (which gave its name to the Romney sheep) and The Downs in Kent are famous for their sheep. Sheep farming in Wales encompasses both upland and lowland areas.

The number of sheep farmed in the UK peaked in 1998 at 20.3 million, as a result of the Sheepmeat Regime, a relatively generous EU support initiative first begun in 1980. Numbers declined following the 2001 outbreak of foot and mouth, and the UK temporarily lost its place as Europe's largest producer of lamb, although this was recovered later. (Although it is Europe's largest producer, the UK is nevertheless a net importer of lamb, often from New Zealand.)

Nowadays many ewes are housed indoors for lambing, which costs more but facilitates earlier lambing with lower mortality and replacement rates. It also rests and protects the grassland, leading to better early growth and higher stocking rates. Sheep are also important in helping to manage the landscape. Their trampling hinders bracken spread and prevents heather moor from reverting to scrub woodland. Wool production is no longer economically important in the UK, and nowadays, sheared fleeces are often treated as a waste product.

=== Pig farming ===
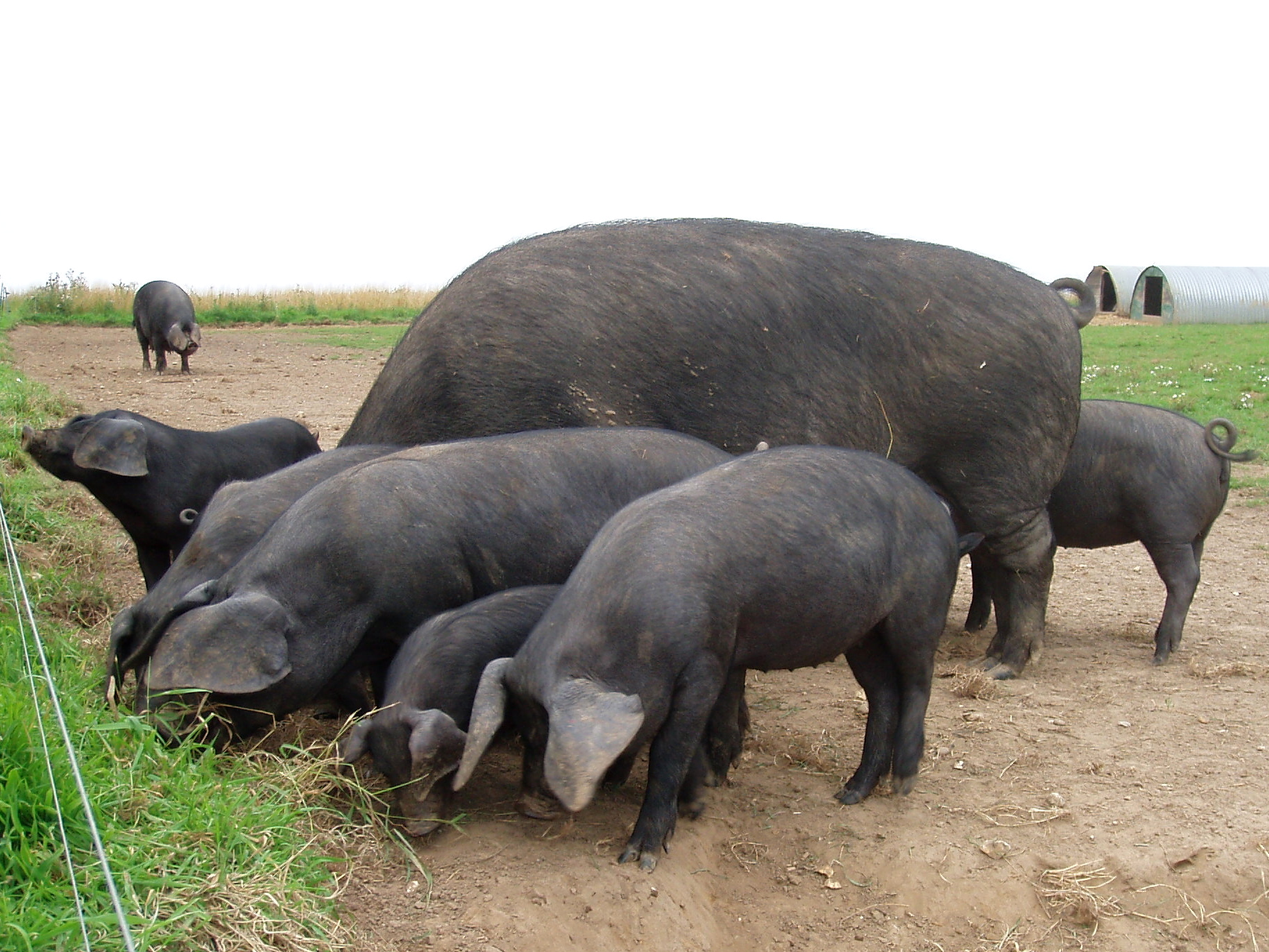
Large Black pigs

Pig farming is concentrated in Yorkshire and East Anglia. About 4,600 farms produce pigs, and the UK is 90% self-sufficient in pork, but only about 40% self-sufficient in bacon and ham, which reflects a traditional British preference for these cuts. Nowadays many pig farms in the UK breed intensively farmed hybrids of types like the Large White, British Landrace, Welsh or British Saddleback, and formerly popular breeds like the Cumberland and Small White are extinct. Wild boar are sometimes farmed. They are currently covered under the Dangerous Wild Animals Act 1976 and farmers need permission from their local authority to keep them.

The UK pig herd is declining, and there are now some individual pig farms in the US that have more sows than there are in the UK as a whole. Pigs often used to be kept indoors throughout their lives, but welfare concerns and increased costs have led to more outdoor units, and by 2002 30% of sows were outdoors. In many countries sows are kept tethered in individual stalls, but this system was banned in the UK in 1999 on animal welfare grounds. Indoor sows are housed in groups. Each sow produces an average of 24 piglets a year and will be pregnant or lactating for 340 days a year. This intensive production wears the sows out, and about 40% of them need to be replaced each year.

A major byproduct of pig production is slurry. One sow and her piglets can produce ten tonnes of slurry a year. Because regulations limit how much slurry can be loaded onto a given area of land, this means that each sow with her progeny will manure at least 0.8 hectares. This is a problem because pig manure is mildly toxic, owing to the use of copper as a growth enhancer.

=== Other livestock and poultry ===
The UK has about 73,000 goats, mostly as milk producers; this number is relatively small by EU standards. (Note: Greece has 5.3 million goats, and Spain, Italy and France well over a million each.) Venison production in the UK is mainly from red deer, with a few fallow deer as well, but there are only about 300 venison-producing farms. As noted above, there are about 26,500 farms with chickens. However, more than half the UK's eggs come from fewer than 400 flocks, mostly with more than 50,000 birds each. Other livestock and poultry farmed on a smaller scale include game birds, ducks, geese, turkeys, ostriches and rabbits. In this way, the UK produce annually 22 million turkeys.

=== Livestock movement and record-keeping ===
Farmers wanting to move their livestock outside their own farms must obey the Disease Control (England) Order 2003 (SI 2003/1729), the Disease Control (Wales) Order 2003 (SI 2003/1966) or the Disease Control (Interim Measures) (Scotland) Order 2002 (SSI 2002/34), as applicable. This means a farmer needs a licence from the local authority to move livestock. There are also minimum "standstill" periods once livestock has been moved, so for example, a farmer buying new cattle and moving them onto his farm must then wait six days before taking other cattle to market. Most livestock must be identified. Each individual cow must have a "passport" issued by the British Cattle Movement Service. Other farm animals such as sheep, goats or pigs must have a herd mark.

=== Disease ===
Designated notifiable diseases under the Animal Health Act 1981 include anthrax, foot-and-mouth disease, fowl pest, bovine tuberculosis, BSE, scrapie, swine vesicular disease, Aujeszky's disease, bovine leukemia virus, rabies and warble fly. Under the Zoonoses Order conditions that can be transmitted to humans, such as brucellosis or salmonella, must also be notified.

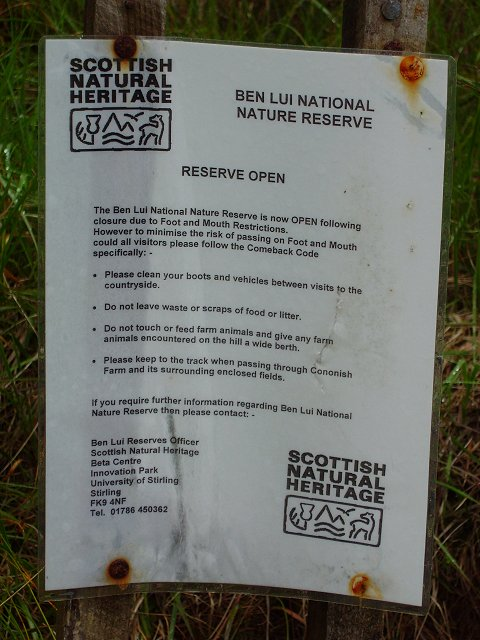
Aftermath of a foot and mouth outbreak in Scotland

The United Kingdom suffered outbreaks of foot-and-mouth disease in 1967 and 2001, with a less serious outbreak in 2007. There was also an outbreak of bluetongue in 2007. The most serious disease to affect British agriculture was BSE, a cattle brain disease that causes a similar disease in some humans who eat infected meat. It has killed 166 people in Britain since 1994.

A current issue is the control of bovine tuberculosis, which can also be carried by badgers. It is alleged that the badgers are infecting the cows. A scientific report for the government recommended a selective cull of badgers, which immediately met with opposition from other scientists. The government is currently consulting on this issue. As of 16 September 2011, a total of 27 online petitions had attracted 65,000 signatures opposing the plan.

=== Animal welfare ===
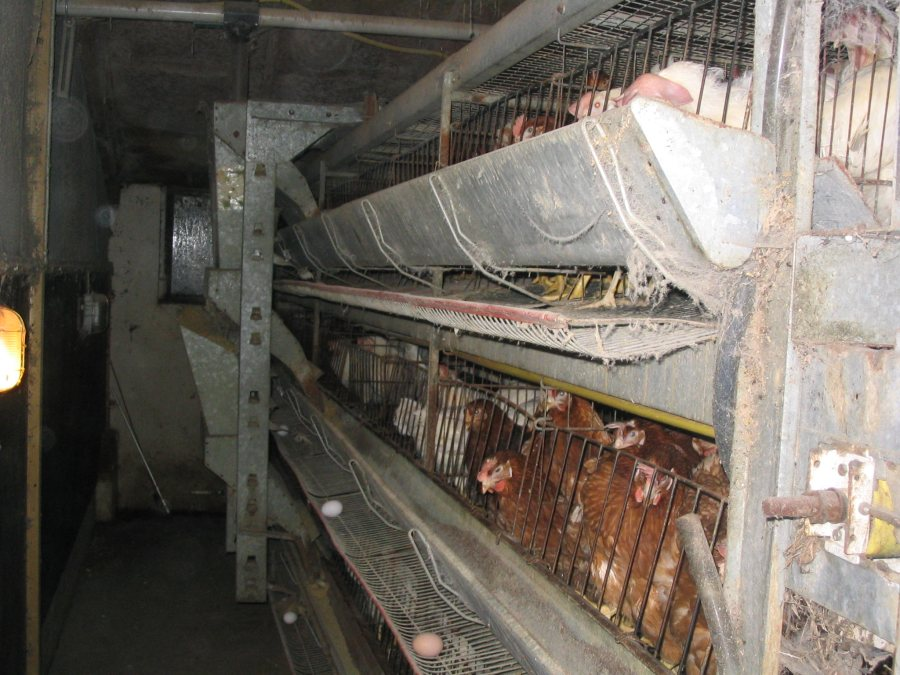
Battery hens

Animal welfare legislation affecting UK agriculture includes the Animal Welfare Act 2006, the Welfare of Farmed Animals (England) Regulations 2007 (SI 2007/2078), the Welfare of Farmed Animals (Wales) Regulations 2007 (SI 2007/3070) and the Welfare of Animals (Transport) Order 1997 (SI 1997/1480). The UK has a good reputation for animal welfare, and there are several codes of practice.

Animal welfare (Note: Animal welfare is hard to measure in any scientific sense and largely relies on the knowledge, expertise and instincts of concerned individuals.) as an issue is increasingly important. Although welfare-conscious husbandry can have economic benefits to the farmer, because a happy animal puts on weight more rapidly and will reproduce more easily, the mere fact that an animal is gaining weight or reproducing does not necessarily indicate a high level of animal welfare. Generally there is a tension between the minimum acceptable level of animal welfare for the consumer, the price of the product, and an acceptable margin for the farmer. This tension is resolved by food labelling that enables the consumer to choose the price they pay for a given level of animal welfare. So for example, many consumers prefer to buy free range eggs even where these are more expensive than eggs from battery hens. Nowadays, there are various welfare assurance schemes in response to consumer pressure. (Note: The European Egg Marketing Regulations say that "free range" hens are those with continuous daytime access to runs with a certain proportion of vegetation, and that have a maximum stocking density of 1,000 birds per hectare (395 per acre).)

== Agricultural education and training ==
The Royal Agricultural University, which was the first agricultural college in the English-speaking world, opened as the Royal Agricultural College in 1845. It was granted its royal charter shortly after its founding. By the latter half of the nineteenth century, as farming grew more complex and methodical and as productivity increased, there was a dawning recognition that farmers needed agricultural education. Thanks to government financial support for agricultural education in the 1890s, the Royal Agricultural College was followed by Writtle College in 1893 and Harper Adams University College in 1901. Meanwhile, the West of Scotland Agricultural College formed in 1899, the East of Scotland Agricultural College in 1901, and the North of Scotland Agricultural College in 1904; these colleges amalgamated to form the Scottish Agricultural College in 1990. Professor John Wrightson opened his private Downton Agricultural College in 1880; it closed in 1906 as it was unable to compete with the publicly funded state colleges.

In England the Royal Agricultural University in Cirencester offers degree-level education and research opportunities in agriculture, as does Harper Adams University in Shropshire. Writtle University College is in Essex. Hartpury University is in Gloucestershire. Hadlow College is in Kent.

In Scotland, Scotland's Rural College operates from Aberdeen. There is no specialist agricultural university in Wales, though courses in agriculture are available. The same is true for Northern Ireland. There is also a specialist agricultural college in Northern Ireland, the College of Agriculture, Food and Rural Enterprise (CAFRE).

== Political and advisory bodies ==
There are numerous bodies and associations, charities and others interested in agriculture.

Agricultural Law Association (ALA)

The Agricultural Law Association (ALA) is a non-political organisation of legal and other experts in agricultural law which offers advice in response to government consultations. Members may be qualified lawyers, surveyors or otherwise professionally qualified. Members may also be qualified as Fellows by the ALA. The ALA operates throughout the UK via regional groups.

Central Association of Agricultural Valuers (CAAV)

The Central Association of Agricultural Valuers was founded in 1910 from a number of local associations. Its current membership is approximately 3,000 who are qualified by the CAAV and are rural agricultural professionals. The organisation operates throughout the UK and does so via its committee network. It provides information resources, meetings, and advice in and regarding government consultations.

Country Land and Business Association (CLA)

The Country Land and Business Association (CLA), formerly known as the Country Landowners' Association, represents a 28,000 membership base of people or organisations owning land in England and Wales. Its purpose is to provide membership services and information, as well as lobbying to secure desired policy outcomes for landowner members.

Farmers' Union of Wales

The Farmers' Union of Wales was formed in 1955 to represent those members farming in Wales. It has the right to represent Welsh farmers in UK government consultations.

National Farmers' Union of England and Wales

The National Farmers Union (NFU) was begun by a group of nine Lincolnshire farmers and, as the "Lincolnshire Farmers Union", held its first meeting in 1904. By 1908 they were called the National Farmers Union and were meeting in London. During the Second World War, the NFU worked closely with the Ministry of Agriculture to ensure food security. Rationing continued after the war and it is a measure of the NFU's influence at that time that the Agriculture Act 1947 committed the government to undertake a national review of the industry every year in consultation with the NFU. After the 2001 creation of DEFRA, the NFU continued to influence policy.

The main NFU operates in England and Wales. The Welsh section is known as NFU Cymru.

The farming and horticultural business base of the NFU as at 2023 stood at over 46,000 business members. The organisation is concerned with promoting the interests of its members by lobbying and campaigning, the provision of information and making available other services to members.

NFU Scotland

NFU Scotland was founded in 1913 and as at 2023 represents approximately 10,000 farmers in Scotland. Its purpose is to further the interests of its members and to inform and represent them.

Scottish Crofting Federation

The Scottish Crofting Federation operates in Scotland and is concerned to promote and protect crofting, a form of small-scale farming found in the Highlands and Islands of Scotland. It campaigns for those purposes.

Scottish Tenant Farmers' Association (STFA)

The Scottish Tenant Farmers' Association, which operates in Scotland, was founded in 2001. It was originally known as the Tenant Farmers' Action Group. Its members are tenants of farms in Scotland and its purpose is to inform membership and promote its interests including by legislative change.

Tenant Farmers' Association (TFA)

The Tenant Farmers' Association was formed in 1981 and operates in England and Wales. Its purpose is to represent tenant farmer members and to lobby on their behalf. It provides information and some services.

Ulster Farmers' Union

The Ulster Farmers' Union was founded in 1918 and operates in Northern Ireland. It has approximately 12,500 members and its purpose is to promote their interests by professional lobbying.

Unite the Union

Unite the Union is the biggest trade union for food and farming workers, with Unite's Food, Drink, and Agricultural sector representing over 100,000 members. It was formed in mid 2015 from a merger of Unite's food, drink and tobacco sector, with Unite's rural and agricultural sector. The sector inherited its paper, Landworker, from the former National Union of Agricultural and Allied Workers.

The union nominates six representatives to the Scottish Agricultural Wages Board to represent workers' interests, six to the Agricultural Wages Board for Northern Ireland, and two to the Agricultural Advisory Panel for Wales.

== Current and recent issues ==
=== Barriers to entry ===
Cost is a key barrier. In the 1930s land with vacant possession cost an average of £60 per hectare. In 1996 it cost £8,795 per hectare. In the same period retail prices rose by a factor of 35, but agricultural land prices rose by a factor of well over 100.

In England and Wales the Agricultural Holdings Act 1986, which consolidated and built on a century-long trend of increasing protection for tenants, became so onerous towards landlords that they were reluctant to let land at all. It became so hard to obtain a tenancy that the farming industry supported reform ending security of tenure for new tenancies. Thus the Agricultural Tenancies Act 1995 led to the creation of Farm Business Tenancies. Since then most new tenancies in England and Wales have been Farm Business Tenancies under the 1995 Act. 1986 Act tenancies remain in force and allow succession, by up to two generations of family tenant. In 2011 the most common route of entry into farming was to succeed to a holding, whether as owner or tenant, so a person's opportunity to farm depended primarily on a family connection.

=== Biofuel ===
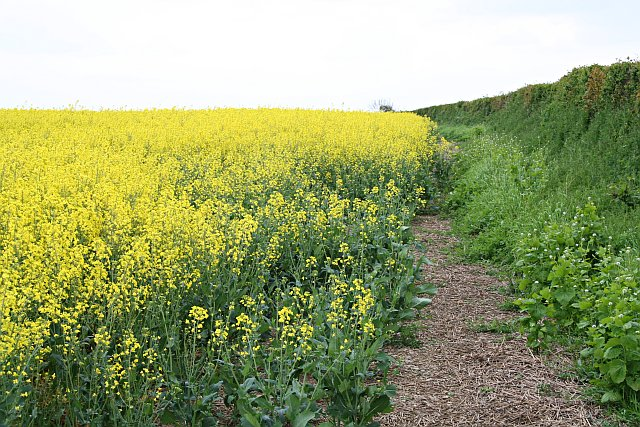
Oilseed rape growing in Cornwall

Biofuels are fuels derived from biomass. They can be used in their pure form to power vehicles, but most commonly they are blended with traditional fuels such as diesel. In 2003, the European Union saw biofuels as an answer to several problems: climate change, energy security and stimulating the rural economy, and agreed the Biofuels Directive to see that production was kickstarted. In 2008, the Gallagher Review expressed concern about the effects of the biofuels initiative and identified the conversion of agricultural land to biofuels production as a factor in rising food prices. The current recommended option is that farmers should use marginal or waste land to produce biofuels and maintain production of food on prime agricultural land.

The Renewable Transport Fuel Obligation ("RTFO") obliges fuel suppliers to see that a certain proportion of the fuel they sell comes from renewable sources. This presents a potentially useful source of revenue for some farmers.

Biofuel crops grown in the UK include oilseed rape (which is also grown for other purposes), short-rotation coppices such as poplar or willow, and miscanthus. Unfortunately biofuels are quite bulky for their energy yield, which means processing into fuel needs to happen near where the crop is grown; otherwise, most or all of the benefit of biofuels can be lost in transporting the biofuel to the processing area. Such local processing units are not generally available in the UK, and further expansion of this market will depend on politics and industrial finance.

=== Custodianship ===
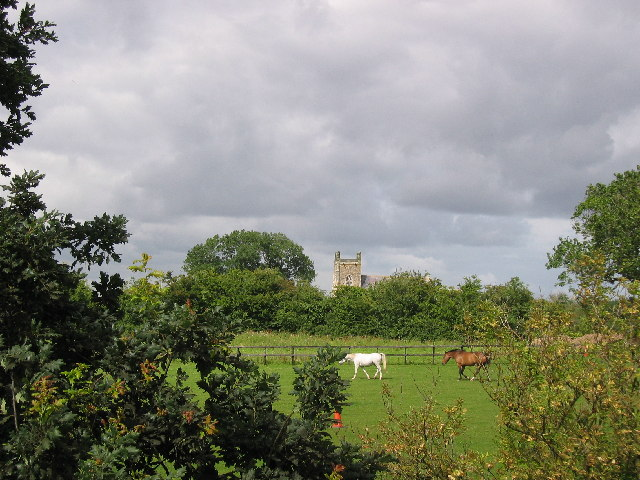
Long Riston in Yorkshire, an old farming community

It was first suggested that farmers could be paid for "producing countryside" in 1969, but the real beginning of positive agri-environmental policy came with the Agriculture Act 1986. The Countryside Stewardship Scheme and local equivalents were run by the Countryside Commission and the Countryside Council for Wales from 1991 until 1996, when they came under ministry control. Nowadays schemes to encourage farmers to think about wildlife conservation and to farm in an environmentally friendly way abound, though actual payments to farmers to support this are comparatively modest.

When EU subsidy regime changes in 2013, farmers will receive a greater proportion of their payments from "management of natural resources and climate action". This forms one of the three "principal objectives" of the reformed Common Agricultural Policy which is under consultation until March 2012.

=== Diversification ===
About half of all farmers in the United Kingdom supplement their income by diversifying their businesses away from pure agriculture. On average diversification adds £10,400 to a farm's revenue.

Sporting rights over farmland for hunting or trapping game have commercial value; game shooting, deer stalking and fishing contribute to the UK economy. Fox hunting has been banned in the United Kingdom since February 2005.

There are many ways of diversifying. Farmland may, for example, be converted to equestrian facilities, amenity parkland, country clubs, hotels, golf courses, camping and caravan sites. Farmers open shops, restaurants and even pubs to sell their products. The Farm Diversification Benchmarking Study, which was commissioned by DEFRA and carried out by Exeter University in conjunction with the University of Plymouth, found that 65% of full-time farming businesses had diversified, but in the June census of the preceding year (2003), the estimate was 19% of full-time farming businesses. The large discrepancy is probably because the census data excluded the letting or subletting of buildings. The most common kinds of diversification are probably letting of barns as warehouses and storage, letting of former farm labourers' cottages (whether as holiday cottages or on longer leases) and farm shops. The number of farm shops in the UK increased by more than 50% between 1999 and 2003.

There is grant funding available for diversification schemes, as well as other initiatives to improve competitiveness in the farming sector, through the Rural Development Programme for England. The scheme runs until 2013, is managed through Defra and has been delivered to date through Regional Development Agencies. Expenditure on the Rural Development Programme for England will remain around £3.7 billion for the 2007–13 programme period, compared with the original planned budget of about £3.9 billion.

=== Organic farming ===
Organic farming is farming without chemical fertilisers, most pesticides, genetic modification, or the routine use of drugs, antibiotics or wormers. In the United Kingdom it is supported and encouraged by the Soil Association. The Food Standards Agency says that organic food offers no additional nutritional benefits over the non-organic kind, though the Soil Association disputes this. However, there are definite benefits in terms of on-farm conservation and wildlife. In the UK as in most of northern Europe, organic crop yields can be 40%–50% lower than conventional, more intensive farming and labour use can be 10%–25% higher.

An Organic Aid Scheme came into effect in 1994, providing grants to fund farmers wishing to convert to organic farming. By the end of 1997 about 30,000 hectares (74,000 acres) had been converted under the scheme, at a cost of £750,000. In 2000 it increased to 525,000 hectares (1,300,000 acres), and between 1996 and 2000, the number of organic farms increased from 865 to 3500. The global market for organic food was worth £1.2 billion a year (2009) and is increasing. The UK's share of the European organic farming market was about 10%.

DEFRA's National statistics Organic farming statistics 2022, published 25 May 2023, state that 509,000 hectares are farmed organically in the UK by 5,500 operators. The figures include land under conversion to organic status. The total organic land is approximately 3% of total farmed land. The largest component was 61.8% of UK organic land in permanent pasture (314,000 hectares). Only 3.1% of UK cattle were raised organically. Cereal growing represented 9.7% of organic land use (49,000 hectares). There has been a 31.6% decrease in organic land use since peaking in 2008. However, the Soil Association is optimistic that an increased organic area is to be anticipated.

DEFRA supports organic farming by offering leaflet advice as to the compatible schemes and grants that generate income. Payments for organic farmers, published June 2023, lists five separate possibilities.

=== Smallholdings ===
Local government authorities have powers under the Smallholdings and Allotments Act 1926 to buy and rent land to people who want to become farmers. Fifty county councils and unitary authorities in England and Wales offer tenancies on smallholdings (called "county farms") as an entry route into agriculture, but this provision is shrinking. Between 1984 and 2006, the amount of land available as county farms shrank from 137,664 hectares (340,180 acres) to 96,206 hectares (237,730 acres), a reduction of 30%. The number of tenants on these smallholdings shrank by 58% in the same period to about 2,900. County farms yielded an operational surplus of £10.6 million to local authorities in the financial year 2008–9. Some local authorities dispose of county farms to obtain capital receipts. Somerset County Council proposes to sell 35 of its 62 county farms. As of March 2009, 39% of county farms were of 50 acres (20 ha) or smaller, 31% of 50 acres (20 ha) to 100 acres (40 ha) and 30% of 100 acres (40 ha) or more.

==== England ====
The Secretary of State for DEFRA is required to present to Parliament statistics for the English local authorities' smallholdings estates. Incomplete but statistically significant data were presented for the fiscal year ended 31 March 2021. This report indicates that of 67,699 hectares held, 65,932 hectares were let as smallholdings. It was estimated that this represents a 0.4% decline in area over a year. Arable farming was the predominant type of farming (27.6%). 1,978 smallholdings were let as at 31 March 2021 at an average rent per hectare of £310. There were 1,416 tenants of whom 69% had farm business tenancies without security of tenure, and 20% had lifetime tenancies held under the Agricultural Holdings Act 1986 with security of tenure. As at 31 March 2021 the total rent roll for smallholdings reported was approximately £20 million.

==== Wales ====
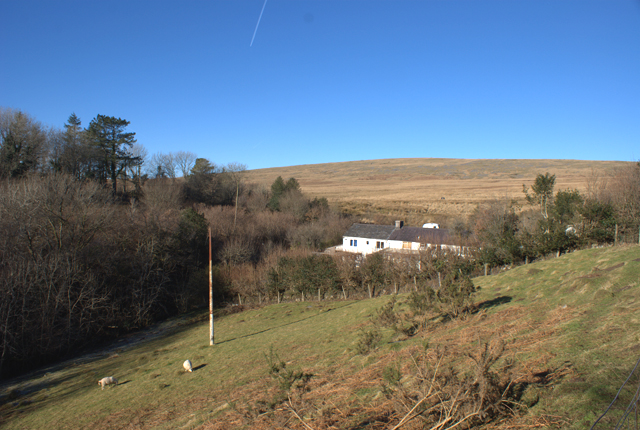
Smallholding at Quarter Beach, Carmarthenshire, Wales (2011). The dwelling sits in the protected dip of the land with sheep-grazing in the foreground. Woodland and an enclosed area of planted trees are by the homestead.

Local authority smallholdings in Wales are the subject of annual public reports made by the Welsh Ministers. The report for 1 April 2021 to 31 March 2022 Just under 1% of total 1.9 M hectares Welsh farm land was held as smallholdings. At 31 March 2022 there were 884 tenants holding 969 tenancies. 62% of the tenancies were under 20 hectares. Total income to the landlords amounted to approximately £4.3M with an operational surplus of £2.7M.

==== Scotland ====
Smallholdings in Scotland, can be either owner-occupied or tenanted holdings. A Scottish smallholding is averagely 20 hectares in extent. There are approximately 20,000 smallholders. 75 are tenants of the Scottish Government under the Small Landholdings Acts 1886–1931. The remainder are mostly crofters governed by the crofting legislation. Smallholdings were reviewed in 2017.

Notable smallholder Michael Forbes was able to prevent Donald Trump's ambitions for a golf course in Aberdeenshire.

== Scandals and mishaps ==
=== 1988 Eggs and Currie ===
The 1988 salmonella in eggs scandal forced junior health minister Edwina Currie out of office two weeks after she declared that most British egg production was affected by salmonella. The public believed her, and 4 million hens and 40 million eggs were destroyed. Years later, The Daily Telegraph claimed there had been a Government cover-up, and that Mrs Currie was right.

=== 1990 Beef-eating Gummer ===
At the height of the BSE "mad cow disease" scare in May 1990, Agriculture Minister John Gummer went on camera feeding his four year old daughter a beef burger as part of his attempt to reassure the public that eating beef was safe. Consequently described by the BBC as "probably the most derided politician to emerge out of the BSE scandal," Gummer had been responsible for delaying a ban on beef offal in 1989.

=== 2006 the Rural Payments Agency: incompetence and sex scandal ===
Subsidy payments under the Single Payments Scheme due to farmers were not made because the Rural Payments Agency had underestimated their task and had seriously underestimated the cost of their intended new computer system. By January 2005, thousands of farmers were unpaid: they exchanged via the NFU forthright views with the Rural Affairs Minister, Lord Bach. By March 2006, money still had not been paid, so the Chief Executive Johnson McNeil was removed. In the midst of the crisis, staff of the Newcastle office of the RPA were reported by the local Evening Chronicle for being captured on CCTV leaping naked between the office filing cabinets. On 12 June 2006, apparently to celebrate their infamy, team members and managers held a drink-and-sex-fuelled party, news of which was reported the following day in considerable detail, alongside a series of apparently leaked office emails in which farmers were referred to in unflattering terms. The Farmers' Weekly followed both the payments and the sex scandal narratives. The new Chief Executive (the third inside a year) Tony Cooper hastened to investigate. In early August there were 4 sackings and 5 disciplinary warnings, and an admission that there had been "incidents of misbehaviour that are simply unacceptable in this organisation".

=== 2007 Foot-and-mouth epidemic ===
The 2007 United Kingdom foot-and-mouth outbreak caused the destruction of over 2,000 animals and the payment of £47 million damages by the government after contaminated effluent escaped from the biological research laboratories at the Pirbright Institute.

=== 2021 Breakdown at the Crofting Commission ===
In-fighting at the Scottish Crofting Commission, a body with key functions and considerable power in relation to crofting, was declared in the 2020/2021 audit to have resulted in that body "falling below the standards expected of a public body in Scotland." The Crofting Commission were required by Audit Scotland in the Report to follow an Implementation Plan to rectify matters.

== See also ==
- Agriculture in England
- Agriculture in Scotland
- Agriculture in Wales
- Economy of Northern Ireland
- Aquaculture in the United Kingdom
- Beekeeping in the United Kingdom
- British cuisine
- Forestry in the United Kingdom
- English land law
- List of renewable resources produced and traded by the United Kingdom
- 2013 Horse meat scandal
