= Agricultural Statistics Act 1979 =

Act of the Parliament of the United Kingdom

Agricultural Statistics Act 1979 (Note: Section 8(1).)
- Act of Parliament
- Parliament of the United Kingdom
- Long title: An Act to consolidate certain enactments relating to agricultural statistics.
- Citation: 1979 c. 13
- Territorial extent: England and Wales (Note: Section 8(3).)

Dates
- Royal assent: 22 March 1979
- Commencement: 22 April 1979 (Note: Section 8(2).)

Other legislation
- Amends: See § Repealed enactments
- Repeals/revokes: See § Repealed enactments
- Amended by: Magistrates' Courts Act 1980; Agricultural Training Board Act 1982; Criminal Justice Act 1982; Agriculture (Amendment) Act 1984; Food Standards Act 1999; Scotland Act 1998 (Consequential Modifications) (No.2) Order 1999; Ministry of Agriculture, Fisheries and Food (Dissolution) Order 2002; Statute Law (Repeals) Act 2004; Church of England (Miscellaneous Provisions) Measure 2006; Statistics and Registration Service Act 2007; Treaty of Lisbon (Changes in Terminology) Order 2011; European Union Withdrawal (Consequential Modifications) (EU Exit) Regulations 2020

Status: Amended

Text of statute as originally enacted

Revised text of statute as amended

Text of the Agricultural Statistics Act 1979 as in force today (including any amendments) within the United Kingdom, from legislation.gov.uk.

The Agricultural Statistics Act 1979 (c. 13) is an act of the Parliament of the United Kingdom that consolidated enactments relating to agricultural statistics in England and Wales.

== Provisions ==
=== Repealed enactments ===
Section 7(2) of the act repealed 4 enactments, listed in schedule 2 to the act.

Enactments repealed by section 7(2)
| Citation | Short title | Extent of repeal |
|---|---|---|
| 10 & 11 Geo. 6. c. 48 | Agriculture Act 1947 | Sections 78 to 81. |
| 6 & 7 Eliz. 2. c. 51 | Public Records Act 1958 | In Schedule 2, the entry relating to section 80 of the Agriculture Act 1947. |
| 1972 c. 62 | Agriculture (Miscellaneous Provisions) Act 1972 | Section 18. |
| 1976 c. 55 | Agriculture (Miscellaneous Provisions) Act 1976 | Section 6. |
| 1976 c. 55 | Agriculture (Miscellaneous Provisions) Act 1976 | Schedule 2. |
