= Plant Varieties and Seeds Act 1964 =

Act of the Parliament of the United Kingdom

Plant Varieties and Seeds Act 1964 (Note: Section 41(1).)
- Act of Parliament
- Parliament of the United Kingdom
- Long title: An Act to provide for the granting of proprietary rights to persons who breed or discover plant varieties and for the issue of compulsory licences in respect thereof; to establish a tribunal to hear appeals and other proceedings relating to the rights, and to exclude certain agreements relating to the rights from Part I of the Restrictive Trade Practices Act 1956; to confer power to regulate, and to amend in other respects the law relating to, transactions in seeds and seed potatoes, including provision for the testing of seeds and seed potatoes, the establishment of an index of names of varieties and the imposition of restrictions as respects the introduction of new varieties; to control the import of seeds and seed potatoes; to authorise measures to prevent injurious cross-pollination; and for connected purposes.
- Citation: 1964 c. 14
- Territorial extent: United Kingdom

Dates
- Royal assent: 12 March 1964
- Commencement: various (Note: Section 41(2).)
Other legislation
Amends	Agriculture (Miscellaneous Provisions) Act 1954; Restrictive Trade Practices Act 1956; Agriculture (Miscellaneous Provisions) Act 1963
Repeals/revokes	Adulteration of Seeds Act 1869; Adulteration of Seeds Act 1878; Seeds Act 1920; Seeds (Amendment) Act 1925
Amended by	Trade Descriptions Act 1968; Tribunals and Inquiries Act 1971; European Communities Act 1972; Northern Ireland Constitution Act 1973; Criminal Procedure (Scotland) Act 1975; House of Commons Disqualification Act 1975; Northern Ireland Assembly Disqualification Act 1975; Plant Varieties and Seeds Act 1964 (Amendment) Regulations 1977; Transfer of Functions (Wales) (No. 1) Order 1978; Magistrates' Courts Act 1980; Criminal Justice Act 1982; Fines and Penalties (Northern Ireland) Order 1984; Agriculture Act 1986; Plant Varieties Act 1997; Scotland Act 1998 (Cross-Border Public Authorities) (Forestry Commissioners) Order 2000; Northern Ireland Act 1998 (Modification of Enactments) Order 2002; Statute Law (Repeals) Act 2004; Natural Resources Body for Wales (Functions) Order 2013; Forestry and Land Management (Scotland) Act 2018; Animals and Animal Health, Feed and Food, Plants and Plant Health (Amendment) Regulations 2022

Status: Amended

Text of statute as originally enacted

Revised text of statute as amended

Text of the Plant Varieties and Seeds Act 1964 as in force today (including any amendments) within the United Kingdom, from legislation.gov.uk.

The Plant Varieties and Seeds Act 1964 (c. 14) is an act of the Parliament of the United Kingdom passed to allow regulation of the sale of plants. It was enacted for the UK to comply with its obligations as a member of International Union for the Protection of New Varieties of Plants.

In 1968, the act was further modified to prohibit plant breeders to sell goods under any other name aside from what was registered with the Registrar of Plant Variety Rights. This raised criticism in Parliament because the register only accepted certain types of names and stopped breeders from being able to sell plants under double names.

In 1997, the act was revised in order to align with terms outlined by the European Union, which came into effect on 8 May 1998. The Act was brought into question again by the European Union in September 2013 because of the complexity and diversity of existing laws, to be replaced by the EU Regulation of Plant Reproductive Material. Writing in The Guardian, Graham Spencer was strongly critical of the changes, claiming they would affect over 50,000 varieties of plants and make it extremely difficult and expensive for farmers to go through the correct process of registering the name.
