= Agriculture Act 1947 =

Act of the Parliament of the United Kingdom

Agriculture Act 1947 (Note: Section 111(1).)
- Act of Parliament
- Parliament of the United Kingdom
- Long title: An Act to make further provision for agriculture.
- Citation: 10 & 11 Geo. 6. c. 48
- Territorial extent: England and Wales (Note: Section 111(3).)

Dates
- Royal assent: 6 August 1947
- Commencement: (Note: Section 111(2).)
Other legislation
Amends	Land Settlement (Facilities) Act 1919
Amended by	Agricultural Holdings Act 1948; Statute Law Revision Act 1953; Agriculture Act 1957; Agriculture Act 1958; Weeds Act 1959; Agriculture (Miscellaneous Provisions) Act 1963; London Government Act 1963; Local Government Act 1966; Agriculture Act 1970; European Communities Act 1972; Agriculture (Miscellaneous Provisions) Act 1972; Statute Law (Repeals) Act 1973; Agricultural Statistics Act 1979; Acquisition of Land Act 1981; Agricultural Holdings Act 1986; Statute Law (Repeals) Act 1986; Statute Law (Repeals) Act 1993; Statute Law (Repeals) Act 2004; Constitutional Reform Act 2005; Transfer of Tribunal Functions Order 2013; Wales Act 2017; Statute Law (Repeals) Measure 2018; Agriculture (Retained EU Law and Data) (Scotland) Act 2020

Status: Amended

Text of statute as originally enacted

Revised text of statute as amended

Text of the Agriculture Act 1947 as in force today (including any amendments) within the United Kingdom, from legislation.gov.uk.

The Agriculture Act 1947 (10 & 11 Geo. 6. c. 48) is an act of the Parliament of the United Kingdom passed by Clement Attlee's post-war Labour government.

== Background ==
The government wanted a positive balance of payments, to lower the amount of food imported into Britain from dollar countries and to promote the maximum agricultural productivity.

== Provisions ==
The act gave farmers an assured market and guaranteed prices for their produce, the objective of this being, in the words of the Minister of Agriculture Tom Williams, "to promote a healthy and efficient agriculture capable of producing that part of the nation's food which is required from home sources at the lowest price consistent with the provision of adequate remuneration and decent living conditions for farmers and workers, with a reasonable return on capital invested".

== Significance ==
The act was a success: in 1938–1939 the output of agricultural machinery in Britain was valued at £2,500,000 (£1,400,000 of this was exports); in 1951 output was over £100,000,000, half of which was exported. In addition, the legislation provided farmers with a degree of prosperity and security not known since the mid-nineteenth century, and they benefited from the guaranteed price and annual price review introduced under the act. Guaranteed markets also absorbed agriculture "into an effective system of economic planning".

== Bibliography ==
- Kenneth O. Morgan, Labour in Power. 1945–1951 (Oxford: Clarendon Press, 1984).
- Viscount Addison, How the Labour Party has saved Agriculture. The Story of Six Great Years (Labour Party Publications, 1951).
