= Agricultural Tenancies Act 1995 =

Act of the Parliament of the United Kingdom

Agricultural Tenancies Act 1995 (Note: Section 41(1).)
- Act of Parliament
- Parliament of the United Kingdom
- Long title: An Act to make further provision with respect to tenancies which include agricultural land.
- Citation: 1995 c. 8
- Territorial extent: England and Wales (Note: Section 41(3)–(4).)

Dates
- Royal assent: 9 May 1995
- Commencement: 1 September 1995 (Note: Section 41(2).)

Other legislation
- Amends: Small Holdings and Allotments Act 1908; Landlord and Tenant Act 1927; Solicitors Act 1974; Rent Act 1977; Protection from Eviction Act 1977; Town and Country Planning Act 1990
- Amended by: Arbitration Act 1996; Trusts of Land and Appointment of Trustees Act 1996; Housing Act 1996; Civil Partnership Act 2004; Regulatory Reform (Agricultural Tenancies) (England and Wales) Order 2006; Legal Services Act 2007; Transfer of Tribunal Functions Order 2013; Agriculture Act 2020; Charities Act 2022; Agriculture (Wales) Act 2023; Planning (Consequential Provisions) (Wales) Act 2026

Status: Amended

Text of statute as originally enacted

Revised text of statute as amended

Text of the Agricultural Tenancies Act 1995 as in force today (including any amendments) within the United Kingdom, from legislation.gov.uk.

The Agricultural Holdings Act 1995 (c. 8) is an act of the Parliament of the United Kingdom which applies to England and Wales. It is in force. The act reformed and substantially deregulated the law relating to agricultural tenancies, and has had the dual effects of increasing the amount of land available to rent in the agricultural sector, and increasing the average rent per acre charged.

== Background ==
By the early 1990s, it was clear that the Agricultural Holdings Act 1986 was not working. The 1986 act had given security to agricultural tenants and held down rents, and the effect on landlords was so onerous that the amount of farmland available to let in the UK was declining by more than 50,000 acres a year. A loophole in the law was found that enabled landlords to avoid the security of tenure conferred by the 1986 act (Gladstone v Bower agreements), and by 1994 more than 70% of new agricultural tenancies used this loophole. This held down the term of an agricultural tenancy to less than two years. But most farmland that fell vacant was not available to let at all: the landlords were often hiring contractors to farm it for them, or entering into share farming or partnership arrangements, rather than letting to the small business farmer.

In February 1991, the MAFF ("Ministry of Agriculture, Fisheries and Food", the body that later became DEFRA) published a consultation paper. The aim was to deregulate, simplify, and encourage the letting of land. In the proposals as originally drafted, there was to be no security of tenure, the common law on notice to quit would apply, and there would be near-complete freedom of contract. So for example, contractual provisions could override the statutory compensation due to tenants for improvements to the holding.

There was dissatisfaction from industry groups with this approach, and the detailed proposals published in September 1992 watered down the initial consultation document quite considerably. In December 1993, the National Farmers Union, the Country Landowners Association, the Tenant Farmers Association and others issued their Joint Industry Statement setting out the consensus proposals for reform. It was this statement that formed the basis of the Agricultural Tenancies Act 1995, which received royal assent on 9 May 1995. The RICS predicted that it would lead to 1 million extra acres becoming available for letting. Market garden land tenanted under the so-called Evesham Custom was given a specific exemption, as otherwise an outgoing tenant would not be able to offer a tenancy to an incomer on equivalent terms and security, this being one of the Custom's essential principles.

== Effects ==
Although the RICS' prediction of 1 million additional acres did not materialise, the decline in the amount of land available to let was halted and indeed there was a modest increase in supply. The 1995 act seems to have caused land to be let for a shorter term and a higher rent. Since 1977 the Agricultural Land Occupation Surveys of the Central Association of Agricultural Valuers has monitored the development of agricultural land reletting and availability with statistics produced on an annual basis and in 2019 the figures indicate that where there is a change of occupation, between 15 and 30% of lettings are made to persons farming for the first time ("new entrants").

The new kind of tenancy introduced in the 1995 act is called a Farm Business Tenancy ("FBT") and since 1 September 1995, almost all new agricultural lettings have used this framework. However, tenancies created under the 1986 act remain in force and unchanged by the subsequent legislation. The 1995 act has been amended somewhat in the Regulatory Reform Order 2006. This has, in a modest way, streamlined, simplified and deregulated Farm Business Tenancies to an even greater extent.

According to Williams et al. 2007, the Agricultural Tenancies Act 1995 changes agricultural tenancies in the following ways:

- No minimum term.
- Little security of tenure.
- Even if the tenant diversifies away from agriculture to a considerable extent, the tenancy will remain as a FBT.
- Rent reviews every three years, unless the contract says otherwise.
- The tenant can remove tenants' fixtures almost at will.
- Compulsory compensation for tenant's improvements.
- Dispute resolution is to be by alternative dispute resolution with arbitration as a fallback option.

The 2006 reforms made the following further changes:

- No longer any need for a tenancy successor to earn a living from agricultural work on the holding.
- Strictures on rent reviews and end of tenancy compensation are further relaxed.
- Simplify the restructuring of holdings under a 1986 Act tenancy.
- Removed the need to apply to an Agricultural Land Tribunal under certain circumstances.
- Strictures on tenancy termination procedures are also further relaxed, provided the minimum period of 12 months is observed.

== Bibliography ==
- Full text of the Agricultural Tenancies Act 1995
- Nix, J., Hill, P., Williams, N. and Bough, J. Land and Estate Management, 3rd edition. Chichester: Packard Publishing Ltd., 1999. ISBN 978-1-85341-111-3.
- Williams, P., Cardwell, N. and Williams, V. Scammell and Densham's Law of Agricultural Holdings, 9th edition. London: LexisNexis Butterworths, 2007. ISBN 978-1-4057-1797-7.
