= Tenant Farmers Association =

The Tenant Farmers Association was formed in 1981 by a group of farmers who felt that their interests were not being forcefully represented by existing bodies. Today, the TFA is the only organisation dedicated to supporting all farmers, in England and Wales, who do not own the land that they operate. This includes those involved in share farming, grazing licences, contract farming arrangements as well as traditional tenant farmers. The TFA lobbies at all levels of Government for policies and legislation which assist those who do not own the land they farm and gives expert advice to its members. The TFA also seeks to support and enhance the landlord-tenant system in agriculture

The TFA represents and advises members on all aspects of agricultural tenancy, land occupation and ancillary matters. It also aims to improve the professional and technical knowledge of its members, to increase the flow of new tenancies and other valid farming opportunities onto the market and to help the farming industry best apply existing legislation occupation of non-owned farm land.

The TFA head office in Reading, Berkshire. The association has a team of employed staff in addition to elected National Chair.

Welsh members have their own website.

== See also ==
- Agriculture in the United Kingdom
- Agriculture in Wales
