= Agriculture (Poisonous Substances) Act 1952 =

Act of the Parliament of the United Kingdom

Agriculture (Poisonous Substances) Act 1952 (Note: Section 12(1).)
- Act of Parliament
- Parliament of the United Kingdom
- Long title: An Act to provide for the protection of employees against risks of poisoning by certain substances used in agriculture.
- Citation: 15 & 16 Geo. 6 & 1 Eliz. 2. c. 60
- Territorial extent: England and Wales; Scotland; (Note: Section 12(2).)

Dates
- Royal assent: 30 October 1952
- Commencement: 30 October 1952 (Note: The Acts of Parliament (Commencement) Act 1793.)
- Repealed: 1 January 1997
Other legislation
Repealed by	Health and Safety (Repeals and Revocations) Regulations 1996

Status: Repealed

Text of statute as originally enacted

Revised text of statute as amended

The Agriculture (Poisonous Substances) Act 1952 (15 & 16 Geo. 6 & 1 Eliz. 2. c. 60) was an act of the Parliament of the United Kingdom passed to provide protection of contractors against risks of poisoning by harmful substances in agriculture. It required protective clothing and other safety measures when handling certain named chemicals.

The act gave permission for the creation of inspectors to regulate harmful substances.

== Subsequent developments ==
The whole act was repealed by article 2 of, and part 1 of the schedule to, the Health and Safety (Repeals and Revocations) Regulations 1996 (SI 1996/3022), which came into force on 1 January 1997.
