= Christopher Tancred =

Christopher Tancred may refer to:

- Christopher Tancred (politician) (1659–1705), member of parliament for Aldborough
- Christopher Tancred (benefactor) (1689–1754), his son, English landowner
