= Parish meeting =

Meeting that all the electors in a civil parish in England are entitled to attend

A parish meeting is a meeting that all the electors in a civil parish in England are entitled to attend.

In some cases, where a parish or group of parishes has fewer than 200 electors, the parish meeting can take on the role of a parish council, with statutory powers, and elects a chairman and a clerk to act on the meeting's behalf. Every parish in England has a parish meeting.

== Function ==
Parish meetings are a form of direct democracy, which is uncommon in the United Kingdom, which primarily uses representative democracy.

In England, the annual parish meeting of a parish with a parish council must take place between 1 March and 1 June, both dates inclusive, and must take place no earlier than 6pm.

In areas where there is a parish council, the chairman of the parish council shall chair the parish meeting, and the parish meeting has none of the powers listed in the next section of this article. It acts only as an annual democratic point of communication.

== Powers where there is no parish council ==
In areas with no parish council, the parish meeting has the following powers:

Allotments: a parish meeting may hold and administer allotments for cultivation (s.33 (3) Small Holdings and Allotments Act 1908);

Bus shelters: a parish meeting may provide and maintain a bus shelter (s. 4 of the Local Government (Miscellaneous Provisions) Act 1953 and s.179 of the Local Government Act 1972);

Burials: a parish meeting is a burial authority. It may therefore provide burial grounds and may contribute towards the cost of burial facilities provided by others (Para 1(c) of schedule 26 to the Local Government Act 1972);

Cemeteries and crematoria: power to adopt byelaws made by a district or London borough council or the City of London (Para11(1) of schedule 26 to the Local Government Act 1972);

Charities: a parish meeting has the same powers as a parish council to appoint trustees to parochial charities. The audited accounts of all parochial charities (except those for the relief of poverty) must be sent to the chairman of the parish meeting who must lay them before the next meeting (s.79 (2) of the Charities Act 1993);

Churchyards: liability to maintain a closed Church of England churchyard may be transferred to a parish meeting by the same process by which such liability is transferred to parish council (s.215 (2) of the Local Government Act 1972). i.e. by serving written request on the chairman of the meeting. See also LTN 65 - Closed Churchyards and Disused Burial Grounds.

Commons: a parish meeting may be registered as the owner of common land if it has inherited ownership from the appropriate pre-1894 authority (often the Churchwardens and Overseers of the Poor) pursuant to section 67 of the Local Government Act 1894 (56 & 57 Vict. c. 73);

Land: a parish meeting has no general power of acquisition but may acquire land to exercise its allotments or burial powers. It may appropriate land from one purpose to another with the approval of the Secretary of State. A parish meeting may dispose of land on the same conditions applicable to parish councils (s.126 of the 1972 act). Section 13(3) of the Local Government Act 1972 provides that the parish trustees shall be the chairman of the parish meeting and the proper officer of the district council. The parish trustees may hold on behalf of the parish meeting the following categories of land:

- Common land
- Allotments
- Cemeteries
- Open space

Licensing: a parish meeting may be an "interested party" and may be consulted in respect of applications for premises licenses (s.13(3) of the Licensing Act 2003);

Lighting: a parish meeting may light roads and other public places (section 3 of the Parish Councils Act 1957);

Rights of way: a parish meeting is entitled to be notified of a public path creation order; an extinguishment order, a diversion order or a definitive map modification order. In relation to the last named, the meeting is also entitled to be consulted by the county council before the order is made (part III Wildlife and Countryside Act 1981 and schedule 15);

Village greens: a parish meeting may prosecute a person who damages or encroaches upon a village green in the parish and thus commits an offence under section 12 of the Inclosure Act 1857 or section 29 of the Commons Act 1876 (39 & 40 Vict. c. 56). See also LTN 56 - The Provision of Play and Sports Equipment on Village Greens);

War memorials: a parish meeting may maintain, repair or protect any war memorial in the parish (ss.1 and 4 of the War Memorials (Local Authorities' Powers) Act 1923).

Staff: Parish meetings do not have the power to appoint staff. Generally speaking it is not a local authority and its powers are not as wide as those of a parish council.

== Funding ==
Section 39(2) of the Local Government Finance Act 1972 provides that a parish meeting is a precepting authority. This means that where there is no parish council the parish meeting must meet its own expenses, usually by precepting on council tax collected by the district council. A parish meeting may only precept for expenditure relating to specific functions, powers and rights which have been conferred on it by legislation.

A parish meeting may request that the district council confer the powers of a parish council on a parish meeting under section 137 of the Local Government Act 1972. This would allow the parish meeting to do any of those things that a parish council can do as specified in the order of which the list is given above.

The power is limited to £9.93 per elector for 2023-24. This is index-linked to the Retail Price Index.

== See also ==
- Town meeting
