= Agricultural Holdings (Notices to Quit) Act 1977 =

Act of the Parliament of the United Kingdom

Agricultural Holdings (Notices to Quit) Act 1977 (Note: Section 15(1).)
- Act of Parliament
- Parliament of the United Kingdom
- Long title: An Act to consolidate sections 23 to 33 of the Agricultural Holdings Act 1948 and certain other enactments relating to notices to quit agricultural holdings in England and Wales and related notices.
- Citation: 1977 c. 12
- Territorial extent: England and Wales (Note: Section 15(3).)

Dates
- Royal assent: 30 March 1977
- Commencement: 7 April 1978 (Note: Section 15(2). The Agricultural Holdings (Notices to Quit) Act 1977 (Commencement) Order 1978 (SI 1978/256).)
- Repealed: 18 June 1986
Other legislation
Amends	See § Repealed enactments
Repeals/revokes	See § Repealed enactments
Repealed by	Agricultural Holdings Act 1986

Status: Repealed

Text of statute as originally enacted

The Agricultural Holdings (Notices to Quit) Act 1977 (c. 12) was an act of the Parliament of the United Kingdom that consolidated enactments related to notices to quit agricultural holdings in England and Wales.

== Provisions ==
=== Repealed enactments ===
Section 13(2) of the act repealed 8 enactments, listed in schedule 2 to the act.

Enactments repealed by section 13(2)
Citation	Short title	Extent of repeal
11 & 12 Geo. 6. c. 63	Agricultural Holdings Act 1948	Sections 23 to 33.
14 & 15 Geo. 6. c. 65	Reserve and Auxiliary Forces (Protection of Civil Interests) Act 1951	Section 21.
14 & 15 Geo. 6. c. 65	Reserve and Auxiliary Forces (Protection of Civil Interests) Act 1951	Section 22(4) to (6).
6 & 7 Eliz. 2. c. 71	Agriculture Act 1958	Section 3.
6 & 7 Eliz. 2. c. 71	Agriculture Act 1958	In Schedule 1, paragraphs 8 to 13, 19, 23 and 24.
1963 c. 11	Agriculture (Miscellaneous Provisions) Act 1963	Section 19.
1967 c. 22	Agriculture Act 1967	Section 29(4).
1968 c. 23	Rent Act 1968	In Schedule 15, the paragraph amending section 21 of the Reserve and Auxiliary Forces (Protection of Civil Interests) Act 1951.
1970 c. 40	Agriculture Act 1970	In Schedule 4, in column 2 of the entry for the Agricultural Holdings Act 1948, the words from "In section 24" onwards.
1976 c. 55	Agriculture (Miscellaneous Provisions) Act 1976	Sections 11, 12, and 16.
1976 c. 55	Agriculture (Miscellaneous Provisions) Act 1976	In section 27(3), the words from the beginning to "instrument appoint; and".
1976 c. 55	Agriculture (Miscellaneous Provisions) Act 1976	In section 27(5), the words "11 and 12".

== Subsequent developments ==
The whole act was repealed by section 101(1) of, and part I of the fifteenth schedule to, the Agricultural Holdings Act 1986, which came into force on 18 June 1986.
