= Agricultural Holdings (Scotland) Act 1991 =

Act of the Parliament of the United Kingdom

Agricultural Holdings (Scotland) Act 1991 (Note: Section 89(1).)
- Act of Parliament
- Parliament of the United Kingdom
- Long title: An Act to consolidate the Agricultural Holdings (Scotland) Act 1949 and other enactments relating to agricultural holdings in Scotland.
- Citation: 1991 c. 55
- Territorial extent: Scotland (Note: Section 89(3). Except for those provisions in Schedule 11 which amend enactments which extend to England and Wales or to Northern Ireland.)

Dates
- Royal assent: 25 July 1991
- Commencement: 25 September 1991 (Note: Section 89(2).)
Other legislation
Amends	Hill Farming Act 1946; Reserve and Auxiliary Forces (Protection of Civil Interests) Act 1951; Crofters (Scotland) Act 1955; Agriculture (Safety, Health and Welfare Provisions) Act 1956; Coal Mining (Subsidence) Act 1957; Opencast Coal Act 1958; Horticulture Act 1960; Crofters (Scotland) Act 1961; Succession (Scotland) Act 1964; Agriculture Act 1967; Conveyancing and Feudal Reform (Scotland) Act 1970; Land Compensation (Scotland) Act 1973; Land Tenure Reform (Scotland) Act 1974; Control of Pollution Act 1974; Matrimonial Homes (Family Protection)(Scotland) Act 1981; Rent (Scotland) Act 1984; Agriculture Act 1986; Housing (Scotland) Act 1987; Housing (Scotland) Act 1988; See § Repealed enactments
Repeals/revokes	See § Repealed enactments
Amended by	Statute Law (Repeals) Act 1993; Planning (Consequential Provisions) (Scotland) Act 1997; Abolition of Feudal Tenure etc. (Scotland) Act 2000; Agricultural Holdings (Scotland) Act 2003; Housing (Scotland) Act 2006; Civil Partnership Act 2004 (Consequential Amendments) (Scotland) Order 2006; Companies Act 2006 (Consequential Amendments, Transitional Provisions and Savings) Order 2009; Public Services Reform (Agricultural Holdings) (Scotland) Order 2011; Land Registration etc. (Scotland) Act 2012; Agricultural Holdings (Amendment) (Scotland) Act 2012; Regulatory Reform (Scotland) Act 2014; Land Reform (Scotland) Act 2016; Bankruptcy (Scotland) Act 2016; Crown Estate Transfer Scheme 2017; Environment, Food and Rural Affairs (Miscellaneous Amendments and Revocations) (Scotland) Regulations 2018; Agricultural Holdings (Scotland) Act 1991 (Variation of Schedule 5) Order 2019; Land Reform (Scotland) Act 2025

Status: Amended

Text of statute as originally enacted

Revised text of statute as amended

Text of the Agricultural Holdings (Scotland) Act 1991 as in force today (including any amendments) within the United Kingdom, from legislation.gov.uk.

The Agricultural Holdings (Scotland) Act 1991 (1991 c. 55) is an act of the Parliament of the United Kingdom that consolidated enactments relating to agricultural holdings in Scotland.

== Provisions ==
=== Repealed enactments ===
Section 88(2) of the act repealed 18 enactments and revoked 3 instruments, listed in parts I and II of schedule 13 to the act, respectively.

Part I – Repeals
Citation	Short title	Extent of repeal
1 Edw. 8 & 1 Geo. 6. c. 34	Sheep Stocks Valuation (Scotland) Act 1937	The whole act.
9 & 10 Geo. 6. c. 73	Hill Farming Act 1946	Sections 28 to 31.
9 & 10 Geo. 6. c. 73	Hill Farming Act 1946	Second Schedule.
11 & 12 Geo. 6. c. 45	Agriculture (Scotland) Act 1948	Section 52.
11 & 12 Geo. 6. c. 45	Agriculture (Scotland) Act 1948	In section 54, the definitions of "deer", "occupier of an agricultural holding" and "woodlands".
12, 13 & 14 Geo. 6. c. 75	Agricultural Holdings (Scotland) Act 1949	The whole act.
14 & 15 Geo. 6. c. 18	Livestock Rearing Act 1951	In section 1(2)(b) the words "in paragraph (d) of subsection (1) of section 8 of the Agricultural Holdings (Scotland) Act 1949".
14 & 15 Geo. 6. c. 65	Reserve and Auxiliary Forces (Protection of Civil Interests) Act 1951	In section 24(b), the words from "for references" to "twenty-seven thereof".
6 & 7 Eliz. 2. c. 71	Agriculture Act 1958	Section 3.
6 & 7 Eliz. 2. c. 71	Agriculture Act 1958	Schedule 1.
1963 c. 11	Agriculture (Miscellaneous Provisions) Act 1963	Section 21.
1964 c. 41	Succession (Scotland) Act 1964	In Schedule 2, paragraphs 19 to 23.
1968 c. 34	Agriculture (Miscellaneous Provisions) Act 1968	Part II.
1968 c. 34	Agriculture (Miscellaneous Provisions) Act 1968	Schedules 4 and 5.
1973 c. 65	Local Government (Scotland) Act 1973	Section 228(5).
1976 c. 21	Crofting Reform (Scotland) Act 1976	Schedule 2, paragraph 25.
1976 c. 55	Agriculture (Miscellaneous Provisions) Act 1976	Section 13 and 14.
1980 c. 45	Water (Scotland) Act 1980	In Schedule 10, Part II, the entry relating to the 1949 Act.
1983 c. 46	Agricultural Holdings (Amendment) (Scotland) Act 1983	The whole act.
1985 c. 73	Law Reform (Miscellaneous Provisions) (Scotland) Act 1985	Section 32.
1986 c. 5	Agricultural Holdings Act 1986	In schedule 14, paragraphs 25(8), 26(11) and 33(8).
1986 c. 49	Agriculture Act 1986	In Schedule 2, paragraph 1, the definitions of "the 1886 Act", "the 1911 Act", "the 1949 Act" and "the 1955 Act".

Part II – Revocations of Subordinate Legislation
Citation	Title	Extent of revocation
SI 1950/1553	Agricultural Holdings (Scotland) Regulations 1950	The whole order.
SI 1978/798	Agricultural Holdings (Scotland) Act 1949 (Variation of First Schedule) Order 1978	The whole order.
SI 1986/1823	Hill Farming Act 1946 (Variation of Second Schedule) (Scotland) Order 1986	The whole order.

== Subsequent developments ==
The act has been amended on numerous occasions, most substantially by the Agricultural Holdings (Scotland) Act 2003 and the Land Reform (Scotland) Act 2016, which introduced new forms of agricultural tenancy and made extensive consequential amendments and repeals to the act, and by the Land Reform (Scotland) Act 2025, which made further amendments to the law on agricultural holdings. Various individual sections and schedules of the act have been repealed by this and other subsequent legislation, but the act as a whole remains in force.
