= Agricultural Holdings (Scotland) Act 1923 =

Act of the Parliament of the United Kingdom

Agricultural Holdings (Scotland) Act 1923 (Note: Section 52(1).)
- Act of Parliament
- Parliament of the United Kingdom
- Long title: An Act to consolidate the Enactments relating to Agricultural Holdings in Scotland.
- Citation: 13 & 14 Geo. 5. c. 10
- Territorial extent: Scotland (Note: Section 52(2).)

Dates
- Royal assent: 7 June 1923
- Commencement: 7 July 1923 (Note: Section 51.)
- Repealed: 24 November 1949
Other legislation
Amends	See § Repealed enactments
Repeals/revokes	See § Repealed enactments
Amended by	False Oaths (Scotland) Act 1933
Repealed by	Agricultural Holdings (Scotland) Act 1949
Relates to	Agricultural Holdings Act 1923

Status: Repealed

Text of statute as originally enacted

The Agricultural Holdings (Scotland) Act 1923 (13 & 14 Geo. 5. c. 10) was an act of the Parliament of the United Kingdom that consolidated enactments related to agricultural holdings in Scotland.

The Agricultural Holdings Act 1923 (13 & 14 Geo. 5. c. 9) made similar provisions for England and Wales.

== Provisions ==
=== Repealed enactments ===
Section 50 of the act repealed 6 enactments, listed in the fourth schedule to the act.

Citation	Short title	Extent of repeal
8 Edw. 7. c. 64	Agricultural Holdings (Scotland) Act 1908	The whole act, so far as not already repealed.
10 Edw. 7 & 1 Geo. 5. c. 30	Agricultural Holdings (Scotland) Amendment Act 1910	The whole act.
9 & 10 Geo. 5. c. 63	Agricultural Land Sales (Restriction of Notices to Quit) Act 1919	The whole act.
10 & 11 Geo. 5. c. 76	Agriculture Act 1920	Part II; section thirty-three; section thirty-four, except the definition of "agricultural committee"; and the First Schedule.
11 & 12 Geo. 5. c. 17	Agriculture (Amendment) Act 1921	The whole act.
11 & 12 Geo. 5. c. 48	Corn Production Acts (Repeal) Act 1921	Section five.

== Subsequent developments ==
The whole act was repealed by section 97 of, and the eighth schedule to, the Agricultural Holdings (Scotland) Act 1949 (12 & 13 Geo. 6. c. 75), which came into operation on 24 November 1949.
