= Agricultural Holdings Act 1986 =

Act of the Parliament of the United Kingdom

Agricultural Holdings Act 1986 (Note: Section 102(1).)
- Act of Parliament
- Parliament of the United Kingdom
- Long title: An Act to consolidate certain enactments relating to agricultural holdings, with amendments to give effect to recommendations of the Law Commission.
- Citation: 1986 c. 5
- Territorial extent: England and Wales (Note: Section 102(3).)

Dates
- Royal assent: 18 March 1986
- Commencement: 18 June 1986 (Note: Section 102(2).)

Other legislation
- Amends: Landlord and Tenant Act 1927; Protection from Eviction Act 1977; See § Repealed enactments
- Repeals/revokes: See § Repealed enactments
- Amended by: Coal Industry Act 1987; Agricultural Holdings (Scotland) Act 1991; Tribunals and Inquiries Act 1992; Statute Law (Repeals) Act 1993; Coal Industry Act 1994; Private International Law (Miscellaneous Provisions) Act 1995; Trusts of Land and Appointment of Trustees Act 1996; Statute Law (Repeals) Act 2004; Agriculture Act 2020; Agriculture (Wales) Act 2023; Renters' Rights Act 2025

Status: Amended

Text of statute as originally enacted

Revised text of statute as amended

Text of the Agricultural Holdings Act 1986 as in force today (including any amendments) within the United Kingdom, from legislation.gov.uk.

The Agricultural Holdings Act 1986 (c. 5) is an act of the Parliament of the United Kingdom that consolidated enactments related to agricultural holdings in England and Wales, with amendments to give effect to recommendations of the Law Commission.

== Provisions ==
=== Repealed enactments ===
Sections 101(1) and 101(2) of the act repealed 18 enactments and revoked 4 instruments, listed in parts I and II of the fifteenth schedule to the act, respectively.

Part I
Citation	Short title	Extent of repeal
9 & 10 Geo. 6. c. 73	Hill Farming Act 1946	Section 9.
11 & 12 Geo. 6. c. 63	Agricultural Holdings Act 1948	The whole act.
12 & 13 Geo. 6. c. 37	Agriculture (Miscellaneous Provisions) Act 1949	Section 10. In Schedule, Part II.
6 & 7 Eliz. 2. c. 71	Agriculture Act 1958	Section 4. In section 9(1), in the definition of "agricultural holding" the words from "as respects England" to "1948 and", the definitions of "contract of tenancy" and "fixed equipment" and in the definition of "landlord and tenant" the words from "as respects England" to "1948 and". In Schedule 1, in Part I, paragraphs 6, 7, 14 to 18, 20 and 21. In Schedule 4, paragraphs 5, 9 and 11.
1963 c. 11	Agriculture (Miscellaneous Provisions) Act 1963	In section 20, paragraph (b), the words "and the period within which the arbitrator is to make his award", the words "the said paragraph 6 or" and paragraph (ii).
1964 c. 51	Universities and College Estates Act 1964	In Schedule 3, in Part I, the entry relating to the Agricultural Holdings Act 1948.
1968 c. 34	Agriculture (Miscellaneous Provisions) Act 1968	Sections 9 and 10. In section 15, subsection (2), in subsection (4) the words from the beginning to "section and", the words "subsection (2) or" and the words "as the case may be" and in subsection (5)(a) the words "or subsection (2)". In section 17, in subsection (1) the definition of "the principal Act" and in subsection (2) the words from "references to the termination" to "holding and".
1970 c. 40	Agriculture Act 1970	In Schedule 4, the entry relating to the Agricultural Holdings Act 1948.
1971 c. 23	Courts Act 1971	In Schedule 9, in Part I, the entry relating to the Agricultural Holdings Act 1948.
1972 c. 61	Land Charges Act 1972	In Schedule 2, in paragraph 1(g), the words from "Section 82" to "improvements)".
1972 c. 62	Agriculture (Miscellaneous Provisions) Act 1972	Section 15.
1976 c. 55	Agriculture (Miscellaneous Provisions) Act 1976	Sections 17 to 24. In section 27(5), the words "and Part II". In Schedule 3, the entries relating to the Agricultural Holdings Act 1948. Schedule 3A.
1977 c. 12	Agricultural Holdings (Notices to Quit) Act 1977	The whole act.
1984 c. 32	London Regional Transport Act 1984	In Schedule 6, paragraph 13.
1984 c. 41	Agricultural Holdings Act 1984	The whole act.
1985 c. 65	Insolvency Act 1985	In Schedule 8, paragraphs 9 and 30.
1985 c. 68	Housing Act 1985	Section 231.
1985 c. 71	Housing (Consequential Provisions) Act 1985	In Schedule 2, paragraph 34.

Part II
Citation	Title	Extent of revocation
S.I. 1951/2168	Agricultural Holdings Act (Variation of Fourth Schedule) Order 1951	The whole order.
S.I. 1978/447	Agricultural Holdings Act 1948 (Amendment) Regulations 1978	The whole instrument.
S.I. 1978/742	Agricultural Holdings Act 1948 (Variation of Fourth Schedule) Order 1978	The whole order.
S.I. 1985/1947	Agricultural Holdings Act 1948 (Variation of Fourth Schedule) Order 1985	The whole order.

== Subsequent developments ==
The act has been amended on several occasions. The Agriculture Act 2020 inserted section 19A, introducing provisions relating to agreements for financial assistance for agri-environment and other purposes. The Agriculture (Wales) Act 2023 subsequently amended section 19A to expand the regulation-making powers of the Welsh Ministers under the act.
