= Christopher Tancred (politician) =

Christopher Tancred (8 April 1659 – 22 November 1705), of Whixley in Yorkshire, was Member of Parliament for Aldborough from 1689 to 1698.

He also served as High Sheriff of Yorkshire in 1684 and Master of the Harriers to King William III.

His son Christopher Tancred (1689–1754) succeeded him as lord of the manor of Whixley.

== Notes ==
Parliament of England
Preceded by Sir Michael Wentworth; Sir Roger Strickland	Member of Parliament for Aldborough; 1689–1698; With: Sir Michael Wentworth 1689–1696; Henry Fairfax 1696–1697; William Wentworth 1698	Succeeded by Sir George Cooke; Sir Abstrupus Danby
Honorary titles
Preceded by Sir Brian Stapylton, Bt	High Sheriff of Yorkshire; 1684–1685	Succeeded by Thomas Rokeby
Preceded by William Ryder	Master of the Harriers; 1689–1701	Vacant
