= Christopher Tancred (benefactor) =

English landowner

Christopher Tancred (11 November 1689 – 21 August 1754) was an English landowner, lord of the manor of Whixley, noted particularly for the trust established by the terms of his will.

== Life ==
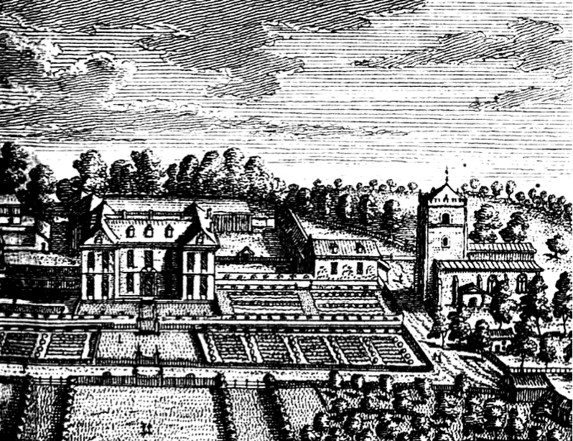
Whixley Hall, with the Church of the Ascension on the right, in 1707

Tancred was born in 1689 at Whixley (now in North Yorkshire), the second son of Christopher Tancred of Whixley, and his second wife, Catherine, daughter of Sir John Armytage of Kirklees. His father was in 1685–6 High Sheriff of Yorkshire, and was Master of the Harriers to William III; his great-grandfather, Sir Richard Tancred, had as a Royalist compounded for his estates under the Commonwealth, and was knighted by Charles II for his services and sufferings during the civil war.

Tancred claimed to have some training as a lawyer, but after his father's death, on 21 November 1705, he spent most of his time at Whixley, performing the duties of a county justice. In 1727 he published An essay for the general regulation of the law, in which the great corruptions and expenses of law controversies are exposed, and effectual methods proposed to redress such great national grievances, 240 pages in length, addressed to the Lord Chancellor, Lord King, in which he elaborated a plan of reform more than a century in advance of his age. He called for the abolition of special bail in civil cases, the simplification of pleadings, the abolition of the more intricate forms of writs, the shortening of interlocutory orders in chancery, the payment of salaries to the judges, the relief of debtors from perpetual punishment, the simplification of conveyancing, the establishment of a general register recording real property securities and the encumbrances thereon, and the lessening of the fees and limiting of the numbers of "those upright dealers and worthy patriots called attorneys-at-law."

With his character of law reformer Tancred combined that of racing-man and horse-dealer. He spent part of his time at Newmarket, where he possessed a small property, which he ultimately left to Christ's College, Cambridge, for the purpose of endowing an exhibition, and in 1734 he served the minister of the Duke of Mecklenburg then resident in London, as "gentleman of the horse and domestick", and was employed to buy horses for him.

Tancred died at Whixley, unmarried, on 21 August 1754, leaving an instruction that his body should not be put under ground. This was literally obeyed, as his coffin stood for some time in the hall of the house, then in the wine-cellar, and later contained in a sarcophagus in the chapel attached to the house. The tomb was moved to the Church of the Ascension in Whixley in 1905.

== His estate ==
Tancred is said to have determined to disinherit his five sisters owing to some monetary disagreement with them. In 1721 he settled his property in trust, in default of male issue, to the use of the masters of Christ's College and Gonville and Caius College, the president of the College of Physicians, the treasurer of Lincoln's Inn, the master of the Charterhouse, and the governors of Chelsea Hospital and the Royal Hospital, Greenwich, and their successors, for the foundation of twelve Tancred studentships, for which purpose £50 apiece was to be paid to twelve young persons of "such low abilities as not to be capable of obtaining the education." Four were to be educated in the study of divinity at Christ's College, four in the study of physic at Gonville and Caius, and four in the study of the common law at Lincoln's Inn. By a further trust £20 apiece was to be paid to twelve decayed gentlemen, clergymen, commission land officers or sea officers of fifty years of age or more, and provision was made that these twelve persons should live in Whixley Hall, which should be called Tancred's Hospital, and its inmates Tancred's pensioners. In his will, dated 20 May 1746, this settlement was recited, and the trustees were further desired to uphold the stone wall round the park and the head of fallow deer therein.

Tancred's Charities Act 1762
- Act of Parliament
- Parliament of Great Britain
- Long title: An Act for incorporating the Trustees named in the Settlement and Will of Christopher Tancred Esquire, deceased; and to enable them to take the Estate late of the said Christopher Tancred, to them and their Successors in Perpetuity, for the Charitable Uses in such Settlement and Will; and for the better Management of the Charity.
- Citation: 2 Geo. 3. c. 15 Pr.
- Territorial extent: Great Britain

Dates
- Royal assent: 24 March 1762
- Commencement: 3 November 1761 (Note: Start of session.)

Status: Current legislation

Tancred's Charities Act 1871
- Act of Parliament
- Parliament of the United Kingdom
- Long title: An Act for confirming a Scheme of the Charity Commissioners for the several Charities founded by the Settlement and Will of Christopher Tancred, of Whixley in the county of York, Esquire, deceased 21st August 1871.
- Citation: 34 & 35 Vict. c. 117
- Territorial extent: United Kingdom

Dates
- Royal assent: 21 August 1871
- Commencement: 21 August 1871 (Note: The Acts of Parliament (Commencement) Act 1793.)
- Repealed: 21 May 1981
Other legislation
Repealed by	Statute Law (Repeals) Act 1981

Status: Repealed

Text of statute as originally enacted

Tancred's Charities Scheme Confirmation Act 1899
- Act of Parliament
- Parliament of the United Kingdom
- Long title: An Act to confirm a Scheme of the Charity Commissioners for the management of the several Charities founded by the Settlement and Will of Christopher Tancred of Whixley in the County of York Esquire deceased.
- Citation: 62 & 63 Vict. c. cclxxvii
- Territorial extent: United Kingdom

Dates
- Royal assent: 9 August 1899
- Commencement: 9 August 1899
- Repealed: 21 May 1981
Other legislation
Repealed by	Statute Law (Repeals) Act 1981

Status: Repealed

Tancred's Charities Scheme Confirmation Act 1923 (Note: Section 2.)
- Act of Parliament
- Parliament of the United Kingdom
- Long title: An Act to confirm a Scheme of the Charity Commissioners for the application or management of the Charities known as Tancred's Charities.
- Citation: 13 & 14 Geo. 5. c. lvii
- Territorial extent: United Kingdom

Dates
- Royal assent: 18 July 1923
- Commencement: 18 July 1923

Status: Current legislation

Text of statute as originally enacted

His carefully devised trust did not escape alteration. His death was followed by a lawsuit, in which the trustees succeeded in establishing the trust on 8 November 1757. A private act of Parliament, Tancred's Charities Act 1762 (2 Geo. 3. c. 15 Pr.), was subsequently passed by which the trustees were incorporated, and were authorised to make rules concerning the charity and to dispark Whixley and sell the deer. Complaints as to the administration of the fund were made in 1867, and the Charity Commissioners, on the application of the governors (13 January 1872), approved and established the scheme under which the charity with regard to the pensioners was subsequently worked. By this the hospital was closed after 1 June 1872, annuities were given to existing pensioners, and it was provided that £80 per annum should in the future be paid to out-pensioners of the same class.
