= Church of the Ascension, Whixley =

Anglican church in North Yorkshire, England

- Church of St James
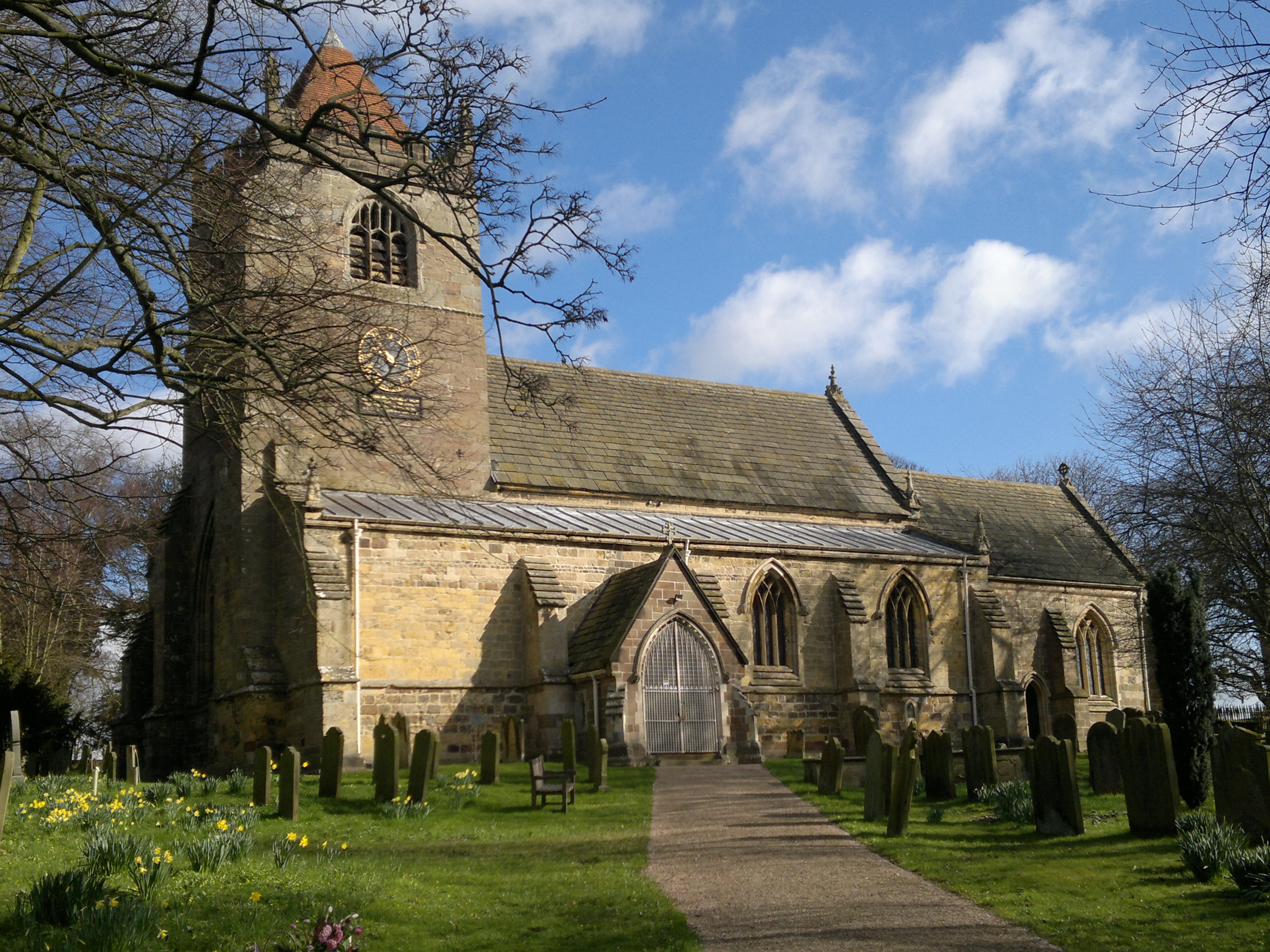
- Church of the Ascension, Whixley

- Location within North Yorkshire
- 54.018°N 1.327°W
- OS grid reference: SE 44204 58297
- Location: Whixley, North Yorkshire,
- Country: England
- Denomination: Anglican
- Website: www.achurchnearyou.com/church/3315/

History
- Former name(s): Church of St James; Church of St Mary
- Status: Parish church

Architecture
- Functional status: Active
- Style: Decorated

Clergy
- Vicar: Reverend Sarah Feaster

Listed Building – Grade II*
- Designated: 15 March 1966
- Reference no.: 1189906

The Church of the Ascension is an Anglican church in the village of Whixley, North Yorkshire, England. Whilst the Domesday Book entry for Whixley mentions the presence of a church, the main fabric of the existing church dates to the 14th century. Up until it was renovated in the 19th century, it was dedicated to St James, but was rededicated as the Church of the Ascension, and it is now a grade II* listed building. Nikolaus Pevsner notes that it is unusual for a village church to be composed of mostly the same style of architecture (Decorated).

== History ==
The stone fabric of the church dates back to the 12th and 14th centuries, whilst some believe that stone from the Roman town of Aldborough (Isurium) was used in building the church. The entry for Whixley in the Domesday Survey mentions a church, though this is not the current structure. (Note: Whixley is listed as Cvcheslage or as Crucheslaga and different translations state either the one church or two churches. At that time, Whixley was in Borgescire, which later became the Wapentake of Lower Claro.) The walls of the church were noted in the 19th century as being "marked with fire". It is thought this was the result of the church being burnt by Scottish raiders in 1319.

The fabric of the church consists of ashlar walls, slate and lead roof, with a west tower that has "an embattled parapet with crocketed finials and a pyramidal roof". The tower is in three stages, with a Perpendicular design. The nave has been described as having very narrow aisles, and it is separated from the other parts of the church by three arches on each side, supported by clustered pillars which display carved heads. The pulpit is carved from Caen stone, having been installed during renovations.

Up until the Reformation, the church belonged to the Priory of Knaresborough, who had the right of advowson. (Note: The Priory of Knaresborough was an order of Trinitarians founded by Robert of Knaresborough. The church at Whixley was appropriated to "St Roberts Juxta Knaresborough" in 1375. Besides Whixley, the order also had churches in Pannal and Hampsthwaite.) Christopher Tancred, who died in 1754, left specific instructions in his will that he was not to be buried underground. After being left in the family manor house in various places for 150 years, his sarcophagus was eventually moved into the church in 1905.

The church was closed for 16 months between 1861 and July 1862 for renovations carried out by George Gilbert Scott which cost £2,949 (equivalent to £310,000 in 2025). Upon re-opening, it was rededicated as the Church of the Ascension, previously having been the Church of St James, or St Mary's. During the renovations, a brick wall that extended from the tower through the aisles and blocking up the west window was removed.

Although the tower is part Perpendicular, the rest of the church is in the Decorated style, something which Pevsner notes as being unusual for a village church developed over some time.

== Parish and benefice ==
The parish of Whixley is within a shared benefice known as Great and Little Ouseburn, with Marton cum Grafton and Whixley with Green Hammerton. The parish of Whixley and Green Hammerton has a daughter church (chapel-of-ease) in Green Hammerton. The church is part of the Deanery of Ripon, the Archdeaconry of Richmond and Craven, and the Diocese of Leeds. Historically, the church was in the Deanery of Boroughbridge, which was part of the Diocese of Chester.

== See also ==
- Grade II* listed buildings in North Yorkshire (district)
- Listed buildings in Whixley
