= Whixley Hall =

Building in North Yorkshire, England

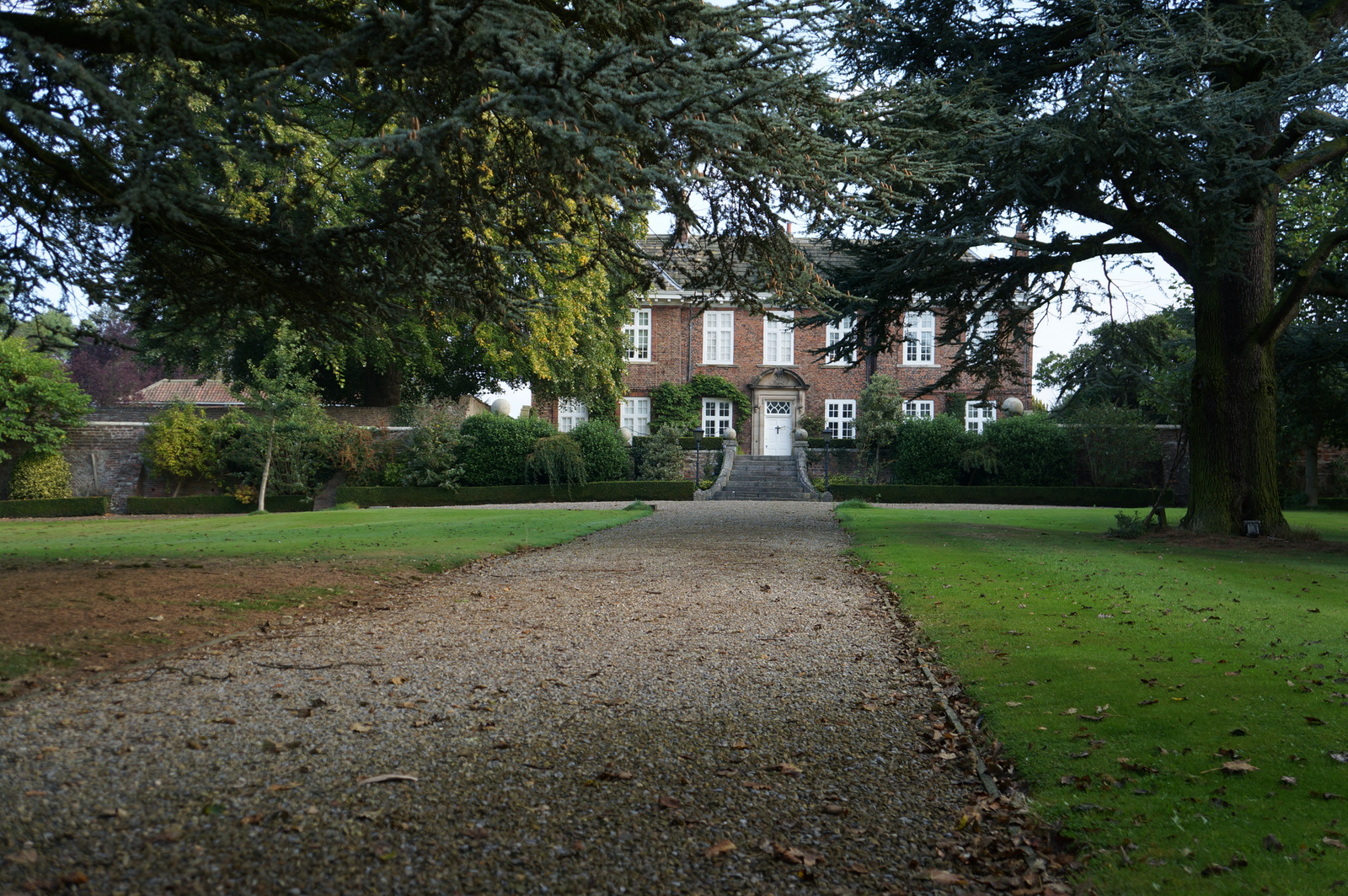
- The building in 2014

- Location within North Yorkshire

General information
- Location: West Lane, Whixley, North Yorkshire, England
- Coordinates: 54°01′08″N 1°19′40″W
- Year built: Mid to late 17th century
- Renovated: 1907 (restored)

Listed Building – Grade II
- Official name: Whixley Hall
- Designated: 8 March 1952
- Reference no.: 1149939

Whixley Hall is a historic building on West Lane in Whixley, a village in North Yorkshire, England.

The house may have been built in 1654; there is a datestone with this date, but it has been moved. Christopher Tancred died in 1754, and under the terms of his will, the building was converted into an almshouse for 12 elderly men. This operated until the mid-19th century. In 1907, Walter Brierley rebuilt the central section of the south front, in a similar style to its original form. The building was Grade II listed in 1952. By 2025, it was a private house with six bedrooms, five bathrooms, and 54 acres (22 ha) of grounds.

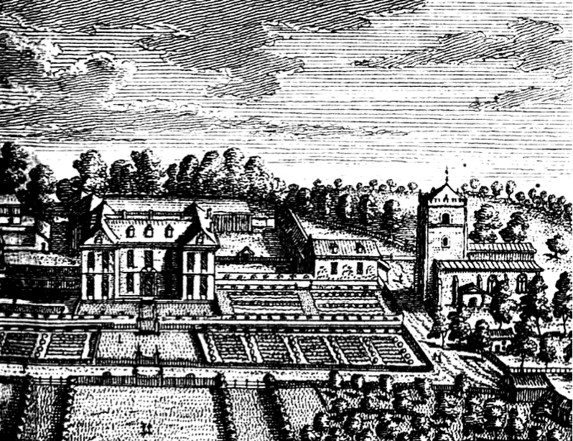
The house in 1707

The house is built of red brick on a stone-capped plinth, with a modillion eaves cornice, and a hipped stone slate roof. There are two storeys and a H-shaped plan, with the courtyard at the rear. The main range has seven bays, the outer two bays at each end projecting slightly behind which are rear wings. In the centre of the main range is a doorway with a moulded surround, and a broken segmental pediment with a vase on consoles. The windows are cross windows under flat brick arches. At the rear some windows are mullioned, there is a large staircase window, and two re-set datestones. Inside, there is an early staircase in the east range.

== See also ==
- Listed buildings in Whixley
