= Listed buildings in Whixley =

Whixley is a civil parish in the county of North Yorkshire, England. It contains eleven listed buildings that are recorded in the National Heritage List for England. Of these, one is listed at Grade II*, the middle of the three grades, and the others are at Grade II, the lowest grade. The parish contains the village of Whixley and the surrounding countryside. Apart from a milepost, all the listed buildings are in the village, and consist of a church, houses, cottages, farmhouses and farm buildings.

== Key ==
| Grade | Criteria |
|---|---|
| II* | Particularly important buildings of more than special interest |
| II | Buildings of national importance and special interest |

== Buildings ==
| Name and location | Photograph | Date | Notes | Grade |
|---|---|---|---|---|
| Church of the Ascension; 54.01879°N 1.32687°W | | Early 14th century | The church has been little altered, apart from some restoration by George Gilbert Scott in 1862. It is built in stone with roofs of lead and stone. The church consists of a nave, north and south aisles, a south porch, a chancel and a west tower embraced by the aisles. The tower has three stages, a southwest stair turret, a large five-light west window, a Perpendicular bell stage, an embattled parapet with crocketed pinnacles, and a pyramidal roof. | II* |
| The Old Cottage; 54.01580°N 1.32512°W | — | 16th century | The house has a timber framed core, but most of it dates from the 18th century when it was encased in brown brick. It has a pantile roof, hipped on the left, one storey and an attic, and three bays. On the front is a doorway, two casement windows, and a horizontally sliding sash window. The upper floor has a fixed-light window, and there are two dormers. Inside, some timber framing remains. | II |
| Whixley Hall; 54.01909°N 1.32772°W | | Mid to late 17th century | The house is in red brick on a stone-capped plinth, with a modillion eaves cornice, and a hipped stone slate roof. There are two storeys and an H-shaped plan, with the courtyard at the rear. The main range has seven bays, the outer two bays at each end projecting slightly behind which are rear wings. In the centre of the main range is a doorway with a moulded surround, and a broken segmental pediment with a vase on consoles. The windows are cross windows under flat brick arches. At the rear some windows are mullioned, there is a large staircase window, and two re-set datestones. | II |
| 1 and 2 Barrack Yard; 54.01684°N 1.32585°W | — | Mid 18th century | A row of three, later two, cottages in rendered brick with an eaves cornice, and a pantile roof with tumbled brickwork in the gables. There are two storeys and three bays. On the front are two doorways, the windows are horizontally sliding sashes, and the ground floor openings have slightly cambered heads. | II |
| Rose Cottages; 54.01659°N 1.32529°W | | Mid 18th century | A row of three cottages in stone, rendered and painted, with pantile roofs, and two storeys. On the front are three doorways, the left with a fanlight and the right with a cambered head. The windows are sashes, some horizontally sliding. | II |
| Laburnum's Farm House; 54.01458°N 1.32268°W | — | c. 1800 | The farmhouse is in red brick with a pantile roof. There are two storeys and three bays. The central doorway has a fanlight, and above it is an inscribed panel and a blind window. The other windows are sashes. To the left is a single-storey outbuilding. | II |
| Barn and gin gang north of Laburnum's Farm House; 54.01471°N 1.32304°W | — | c. 1800 | The barn is in red brick with a pantile roof. In the centre are large doors with a wooden lintel under a segmental brick head, flanked by rows of narrow vents. Attached at the rear is a six-sided gin gang with five brick piers carrying a pantile roof. | II |
| Stables to rear of Laburnum's Farm House; 54.01467°N 1.32257°W | — | c. 1800 | The stable with haylofts above is in red brick with a pantile roof. There are two storeys and three bays. On the ground floor are two stable doors, and to the right is a stone water trough built into the wall. The upper storey contains three loft doors, and on the right gable wall are external steps. | II |
| Pear Tree House; 54.01490°N 1.32322°W | — | c. 1800 | The farmhouse is in red brick with a slate roof. There are two storeys and three bays. In the centre is a doorway with a decorated fanlight. The windows are sashes, and all the openings have cambered heads. | II |
| Stone Gate Farmhouse, wall, railings and gate 54.01490°N 1.32322°W | | Early 19th century | The farmhouse is in light red brick, and has a pantile roof with stone kneelers and coping. There are two storeys and attics, and three bays. The central doorway has Ionic pilasters, a fanlight and a modillion cornice. The windows are sashes in architraves with slightly cambered gauged brick arches. On the left return is a round-headed attic window. The forecourt is enclosed by a brick wall with stone coping, and cast iron railings and a gate, the gate piers with ball finials. | II |
| Milepost; 54.00681°N 1.34352°W | | 19th century | The milepost on the south side of the A59 road is in gritstone with a cast iron plate. It has a triangular plan and a rounded top. On the top is inscribed "Knaresborough & Green Hammerton Road" and "Whixley". On the left face is the distance to Knaresborough, and on the right face to Green Hammerton. | II |
