= Hill Farming Act 1946 =

Act of the Parliament of the United Kingdom

Hill Farming Act 1946 (Note: Section 41.)
- Act of Parliament
- Parliament of the United Kingdom
- Long title: An Act to make provision for promoting the rehabilitation of hill farming land; for the payment of subsidies in respect of hill sheep and hill cattle, for controlling the keeping of rams and ram lambs; for regulating the burning of heather and grass; for amending the law as to the valuation of sheep stocks in Scotland; and for purposes connected with the matters aforesaid.
- Citation: 9 & 10 Geo. 6. c. 73
- Territorial extent: United Kingdom

Dates
- Royal assent: 6 November 1946
- Commencement: 6 November 1946 (Note: The Acts of Parliament (Commencement) Act 1793.)

Other legislation
- Amended by: Agricultural Holdings (Scotland) Act 1949Statute Law Revision Act 1953; Hill Farming Act 1954; Forgery and Counterfeiting Act 1981; Law Reform (Miscellaneous Provisions) (Scotland) Act 1985; Agricultural Holdings Act 1986; Statute Law (Repeals) Act 1986; Agricultural Holdings (Scotland) Act 1991; Statute Law (Repeals) Act 1993; Trusts of Land and Appointment of Trustees Act 1996; Statute Law (Repeals) Act 2004

Status: Amended

Text of statute as originally enacted

Revised text of statute as amended

Text of the Hill Farming Act 1946 as in force today (including any amendments) within the United Kingdom, from legislation.gov.uk.

The Hill Farming Act 1946 (9 & 10 Geo. 6. c. 73) is an act of the Parliament of the United Kingdom. It was passed during the Labour government of Clement Attlee. This act aimed to encourage the expansion of pastoral farming and made grants available for improving upland farms.
