= List of acts of the Parliament of the United Kingdom from 1923 =

This is a complete list of acts of the Parliament of the United Kingdom for the year 1923.

Note that the first parliament of the United Kingdom was held in 1801; parliaments between 1707 and 1800 were either parliaments of Great Britain or of Ireland). For acts passed up until 1707, see the list of acts of the Parliament of England and the list of acts of the Parliament of Scotland. For acts passed from 1707 to 1800, see the list of acts of the Parliament of Great Britain. See also the list of acts of the Parliament of Ireland.

For acts of the devolved parliaments and assemblies in the United Kingdom, see the list of acts of the Scottish Parliament, the list of acts of the Northern Ireland Assembly, and the list of acts and measures of Senedd Cymru; see also the list of acts of the Parliament of Northern Ireland.

The number shown after each act's title is its chapter number. Acts passed before 1963 are cited using this number, preceded by the year(s) of the reign during which the relevant parliamentary session was held; thus the Union with Ireland Act 1800 is cited as "39 & 40 Geo. 3 c. 67", meaning the 67th act passed during the session that started in the 39th year of the reign of George III and which finished in the 40th year of that reign. Note that the modern convention is to use Arabic numerals in citations (thus "41 Geo. 3" rather than "41 Geo. III"). Acts of the last session of the Parliament of Great Britain and the first session of the Parliament of the United Kingdom are both cited as "41 Geo. 3". Acts passed from 1963 onwards are simply cited by calendar year and chapter number.

== 13 & 14 Geo. 5 ==
The second session of the 32nd Parliament of the United Kingdom, which met from 13 February 1923 until 16 November 1923.

No private acts were passed during this session.

This session was also traditionally cited as 13 & 14 Geo. 5.

=== Public general acts ===
Short title	Citation	Royal assent
Long title
Consolidated Fund (No. 1) Act 1923 (repealed)	13 & 14 Geo. 5. c. 1	29 March 1923
An Act to apply certain sums out of the Consolidated Fund to the service of the years ending on the thirty-first day of March one thousand nine hundred and twenty-three, and one thousand nine hundred and twenty-four. (Repealed by Statute Law Revision Act 1950 (14 Geo. 6. c. 6))
Unemployment Insurance Act 1923 (repealed)	13 & 14 Geo. 5. c. 2	29 March 1923
An Act to amend the provisions of the Unemployment Insurance Acts, 1920 to 1922, relating to special periods, the period of benefit and the conditions for the receipt of benefit, to provide for continuing the existing rates of benefit and for making consequential alterations in the rates of contributions, and to enable benefit to be administered in the case of persons under the age of eighteen years through local education authorities, and otherwise to amend those Acts. (Repealed by Unemployment Insurance Act 1935 (25 & 26 Geo. 5. c. 8))
Army and Air Force (Annual) Act 1923 (repealed)	13 & 14 Geo. 5. c. 3	26 April 1923
An Act to provide, during Twelve Months, for the Discipline and Regulation of the Army and Air Force. (Repealed by Statute Law Revision Act 1950 (14 Geo. 6. c. 6) and Revision of the Army and Air Force Acts (Transitional Provisions) Act 1955 (3 & 4 Eliz. 2. c. 20))
Fees (Increase) Act 1923 (repealed)	13 & 14 Geo. 5. c. 4	26 April 1923
An Act to provide for the increase of certain fees and the imposition of certain new fees in respect of various services, and for purposes connected therewith. (Repealed by Merchant Shipping (Registration, etc.) Act 1993 (c. 22))
Dangerous Drugs and Poisons (Amendment) Act 1923 (repealed)	13 & 14 Geo. 5. c. 5	17 May 1923
An Act to amend the Dangerous Drugs Act, 1920, (Note: Dangerous Drugs Act 1920 (10 & 11 Geo. 5. c. 46)) and section seventeen of the Pharmacy Act, 1868, (Note: Pharmacy Act 1868 (31 & 32 Vict. c. 121)) and to prescribe the method of calculating percentages in liquid preparations for the purpose of the Poisons and Pharmacy Act, 1908, (Note: Poisons and Pharmacy Act 1908 (8 Edw. 7. c. 55)) and the Dangerous Drugs Act, 1920. (Repealed by Dangerous Drugs Act 1951 (14 & 15 Geo. 6. c. 48))
Local Authorities (Emergency Provisions) Act 1923 (repealed)	13 & 14 Geo. 5. c. 6	17 May 1923
An Act to extend the duration of and amend certain provisions of the Local Authorities (Financial Provisions) Act, 1921, (Note: Local Authorities (Financial Provisions) Act 1921 (11 & 12 Geo. 5. c. 67)) and the Poor Law Emergency Provisions (Scotland) Act, 1921. (Note: Poor Law Emergency Provisions (Scotland) Act 1921 (11 & 12 Geo. 5. c. 64)) (Repealed by Local Government Act 1929 (19 & 20 Geo. 5. c. 17), Local Government Act 1933 (23 & 24 Geo. 5. c. 51), Poor Law (Scotland) Act 1934 (24 & 25 Geo. 5. c. 52) and National Assistance Act 1948 (11 & 12 Geo. 6. c. 29))
Increase of Rent and Mortgage Interest Restrictions (Continuance) Act 1923 (repealed)	13 & 14 Geo. 5. c. 7	17 May 1923
An Act to continue the Increase of Rent and Mortgage Interest (Restrictions) Act, 1920, (Note: Increase of Rent and Mortgage Interest (Restrictions) Act 1920 (10 & 11 Geo. 5. c. 17)) and any enactment amending that Act, until the thirty-first day of July, nineteen hundred and twenty-three. (Repealed by Statute Law Revision Act 1950 (14 Geo. 6. c. 6))
Industrial Assurance Act 1923 (repealed)	13 & 14 Geo. 5. c. 8	7 June 1923
An Act to consolidate and amend the law relating to Industrial Assurance, and to make provision with respect to war bond policies and policies to which the Courts (Emergency Powers) Act, 1914, (Note: Courts (Emergency Powers) Act 1914 (4 & 5 Geo. 5. c. 78)) applies, and bond investment business. (Repealed by Financial Services and Markets Act 2000 (c. 8))
Agricultural Holdings Act 1923 (repealed)	13 & 14 Geo. 5. c. 9	7 June 1923
An Act to consolidate certain enactments relating to Agricultural Holdings in England and Wales. (Repealed by Agricultural Holdings Act 1948 (11 & 12 Geo. 6. c. 63))
Agricultural Holdings (Scotland) Act 1923 (repealed)	13 & 14 Geo. 5. c. 10	7 June 1923
An Act to consolidate the Enactment relating to Agricultural Holdings in Scotland. (Repealed by Agricultural Holdings (Scotland) Act 1949 (12, 13 & 14 Geo. 6. c. 75))
Special Constables Act 1923	13 & 14 Geo. 5. c. 11	7 June 1923
An Act to make perpetual, subject to an amendment, the Special Constables Act, 1914; (Note: Special Constables Act 1914 (4 & 5 Geo. 5. c. 61)) to provide for the employment of special constables in connection with Naval, Military and Air Force yards and stations; and to remove certain limitations on the appointment of special constables in Scotland.
Restoration of Order in Ireland (Indemnity) Act 1923 (repealed)	13 & 14 Geo. 5. c. 12	7 June 1923
An Act to prohibit the institution and prosecution of legal proceedings in respect of action taken under the Restoration of Order in Ireland Regulations, and to make provision as to claims for compensation by persons affected. (Repealed by Statute Law Revision Act 1950 (14 Geo. 6. c. 6) and Statute Law Revision Act 1953 (2 & 3 Eliz. 2. c. 5))
Rent Restrictions (Notices of Increase) Act 1923 (repealed)	13 & 14 Geo. 5. c. 13	7 June 1923
An Act to amend the Increase of Rent and Mortgage Interest (Restrictions) Act, 1920, with respect to the effect of notices to increase rent given thereunder; and for purposes consequential thereon. (Repealed for England and Wales by Rent Act 1957 (5 & 6 Eliz. 2. c. 25) and for Scotland by Rent (Scotland) Act 1971 (c. 28))
Finance Act 1923 (repealed)	13 & 14 Geo. 5. c. 14	18 July 1923
An Act to grant certain Duties of Customs and Inland Revenue (including Excise), to alter other Duties, to amend the Law relating to Customs and Inland Revenue (including Excise) and the National Debt, and to make further provision in connection with Finance. (Repealed by Statute Law (Repeals) Act 2008 (c. 12))
Alderney (Transfer of Property, &c.) Act 1923	13 & 14 Geo. 5. c. 15	18 July 1923
An Act to provide for the transfer of certain property, rights, duties and liabilities in or in connection with the Island of Alderney.
Salmon and Freshwater Fisheries Act 1923 (repealed)	13 & 14 Geo. 5. c. 16	18 July 1923
An Act to consolidate and amend the enactments relating to Salmon and Freshwater Fisheries in England and Wales. (Repealed by Salmon and Freshwater Fisheries Act 1975 (c. 51))
Explosives Act 1923 (repealed)	13 & 14 Geo. 5. c. 17	18 July 1923
An Act to amend the Explosives Act, 1875. (Note: Explosives Act 1875 (38 & 39 Vict. c. 17)) (Repealed by Manufacture and Storage of Explosives Regulations 2005 (SI 2005/1082))
War Memorials (Local Authorities' Powers) Act 1923	13 & 14 Geo. 5. c. 18	18 July 1923
An Act to enable local authorities under certain circumstances to maintain, repair and protect war memorials vested in them.
Matrimonial Causes Act 1923 (repealed)	13 & 14 Geo. 5. c. 19	18 July 1923
An Act to amend the Matrimonial Causes Act, 1857. (Note: Matrimonial Causes Act 1857 (20 & 21 Vict. c. 85)) (Repealed by Supreme Court of Judicature (Consolidation) Act 1925 (15 & 16 Geo. 5. c. 49))
Mines (Working Facilities and Support) Act 1923	13 & 14 Geo. 5. c. 20	18 July 1923
An Act to make provisions for facilitating the working of minerals and for imposing restrictions on the working of minerals required for the support of railways, buildings, and works.
Forestry (Transfer of Woods) Act 1923 (repealed)	13 & 14 Geo. 5. c. 21	18 July 1923
An Act to provide for the transfer of certain properties to the Forestry Commissioners and to amend the Forestry Act, 1919, (Note: Forestry Act 1919 (9 & 10 Geo. 5. c. 58)) and for purposes in connection therewith. (Repealed for England and Wales and Scotland by Forestry Act 1967 (c. 10) and for the Isle of Man by Statute Law (Repeals) Act 2004 (c. 14))
Cotton Industry Act 1923 (repealed)	13 & 14 Geo. 5. c. 22	18 July 1923
An Act to provide for the collection of a contribution by cotton spinners in Great Britain to the funds of the Empire Cotton Growing Corporation; and for other matters relating to the Cotton Industry. (Repealed by Statute Law Revision Act 1950 (14 Geo. 6. c. 6))
Bastardy Act 1923 (repealed)	13 & 14 Geo. 5. c. 23	31 July 1923
An Act to amend the Bastardy Laws, and to make further and better provision with regard to children of unmarried parents; and for other purposes connected therewith. (Repealed by Affiliation Proceedings Act 1957 (5 & 6 Eliz. 2. c. 55))
Housing, &c. Act 1923 or the Chamberlain Act (repealed)	13 & 14 Geo. 5. c. 24	31 July 1923
An Act to amend the enactments relating to the Housing of the Working Classes (including the amendment and revocation of building byelaws), Town Planning and the Acquisition of Small Dwellings. (Repealed for Scotland by Statute Law (Repeals) Act 1981 (c. 19) and for England and Wales by Housing (Consequential Provisions) Act 1985 (c. 71))
Agriculture (Amendment) Act 1923 (repealed)	13 & 14 Geo. 5. c. 25	31 July 1923
An Act to amend the Agricultural Holdings Acts. (Repealed by Agricultural Holdings Act 1948 (11 & 12 Geo. 6. c. 63) and Agricultural Holdings (Scotland) Act 1949 (12, 13 & 14 Geo. 6. c. 75))
Isle of Man (Customs) Act 1923 (repealed)	13 & 14 Geo. 5. c. 26	31 July 1923
An Act to amend the Law with respect to Customs in the Isle of Man. (Repealed by Statute Law Revision Act 1950 (14 Geo. 6. c. 6))
Railway Fires Act (1905) Amendment Act 1923	13 & 14 Geo. 5. c. 27	31 July 1923
An Act to amend the Railway Fires Act, 1905. (Note: Railway Fires Act 1905 (5 Edw. 7. c. 11))
Intoxicating Liquor (Sale to Persons under Eighteen) Act 1923 (repealed)	13 & 14 Geo. 5. c. 28	31 July 1923
An Act to amend the law relating to the sale of intoxicating liquor to persons between fourteen and eighteen years of age. (Repealed for England and Wales by Licensing Act 1953 (1 & 2 Eliz. 2. c. 46) and for Scotland by Licensing (Scotland) Act 1959 (7 & 8 Eliz. 2. c. 51))
Public Works Loans Act 1923 (repealed)	13 & 14 Geo. 5. c. 29	31 July 1923
An Act to grant money for the purpose of certain Local Loans out of the Local Loans Fund, and for other purposes relating to Local Loans. (Repealed by Statute Law Revision Act 1950 (14 Geo. 6. c. 6))
Railways (Authorisation of Works) Act 1923 (repealed)	13 & 14 Geo. 5. c. 30	31 July 1923
An Act to extend temporarily the powers of the Minister of Transport with respect to the authorisation of railway works. (Repealed by Statute Law Revision Act 1950 (14 Geo. 6. c. 6))
East India Loans Act 1923 (repealed)	13 & 14 Geo. 5. c. 31	31 July 1923
An Act to empower the Secretary of State in Council of India to raise money in Great Britain for the Service of the Government of India. (Repealed by East India Loans Act 1937 (1 Edw. 8 & 1 Geo. 6. c. 14))
Rent and Mortgage Interest Restrictions Act 1923 (repealed)	13 & 14 Geo. 5. c. 32	31 July 1923
An Act to amend and prolong the duration of the Increase of Rent and Mortgage Interest (Restrictions) Act, 1920, and any enactment amending that Act, and to make provision as to the rent and recovery of possession of premises in certain cases after the expiry of that Act, and for purposes in connection therewith. (Repealed for England and Wales by Rent Act 1968 (c. 23) and for Scotland by Rent (Scotland) Act 1971 (c. 28))
Universities of Oxford and Cambridge Act 1923	13 & 14 Geo. 5. c. 33	31 July 1923
An Act to make further provision with respect to the Universities of Oxford and Cambridge and the Colleges therein.
Agricultural Credits Act 1923	13 & 14 Geo. 5. c. 34	31 July 1923
An Act to facilitate the advance of money and the grant of credit for certain agricultural purposes, and to amend the Improvement of Land Act, 1864, (Note: Improvement of Land Act 1864 (27 & 28 Vict. c. 114)) and for purposes connected therewith.
Appropriation Act 1923 (repealed)	13 & 14 Geo. 5. c. 35	2 August 1923
An Act to apply a sum out of the Consolidated Fund to the service of the year ending on the thirty-first day of March one thousand nine hundred and twenty-four, and to appropriate the Supplies granted in this Session of Parliament. (Repealed by Statute Law Revision Act 1950 (14 Geo. 6. c. 6))
Dentists Act 1923 (repealed)	13 & 14 Geo. 5. c. 36	2 August 1923
An Act to amend the Dentists Act, 1921. (Note: Dentists Act 1921 (11 & 12 Geo. 5. c. 21)) (Repealed by Dentists Act 1957 (5 & 6 Eliz. 2. c. 28))
Expiring Laws Continuance Act 1923 (repealed)	13 & 14 Geo. 5. c. 37	2 August 1923
An Act to continue certain expiring laws. (Repealed by Statute Law Revision Act 1950 (14 Geo. 6. c. 6))
Education (Institution Children) Act 1923 (repealed)	13 & 14 Geo. 5. c. 38	2 August 1923
An Act to amend the law relating to the education of children who are receiving education in an area other than that to which they belong. (Repealed by Education Act 1944 (7 & 8 Geo. 6. c. 31))
Agricultural Rates Act 1923 (repealed)	13 & 14 Geo. 5. c. 39	2 August 1923
An Act to amend the law relating to the relief from rates to be given in respect of agricultural land in England and agricultural land and heritages in Scotland, and for purposes in connection therewith. (Repealed by Local Government Act 1929 (19 & 20 Geo. 5. c. 17) and Local Government (Scotland) Act 1929 (19 & 20 Geo. 5. c. 25))
Merchant Shipping Acts (Amendment) Act 1923 (repealed)	13 & 14 Geo. 5. c. 40	2 August 1923
An Act to amend the Merchant Shipping Acts, 1894 to 1921, with respect to the expenses of the medical attendance of masters and seamen suffering from Venereal Disease. (Repealed by Merchant Shipping Act 1970 (c. 36))
Town Councils (Scotland) Act 1923 (repealed)	13 & 14 Geo. 5. c. 41	2 August 1923
An Act to amend the law relating to the election of town councillors in Scotland, and to make provision with regard to the powers of returning officers at elections of parish councillors in Glasgow. (Repealed by Local Government (Scotland) Act 1947 (10 & 11 Geo. 6. c. 43))
Workmen's Compensation Act 1923 (repealed)	13 & 14 Geo. 5. c. 42	16 November 1923
An Act to amend the Workmen's Compensation Act, 1906, (Note: Workmen's Compensation Act 1906 (6 Edw. 7. c. 58)) and the Acts amending that Act, and to amend the law with respect to employers' liability insurance, the notification of accidents, first aid, and ambulance. (Repealed for England and Wales and Scotland by National Insurance (Industrial Injuries) Act 1946 (9 & 10 Geo. 6. c. 62) and Mines and Quarries Act 1954 (2 & 3 Eliz. 2. c. 70) and for Northern Ireland by Statute Law Revision Act 1953 (2 & 3 Eliz. 2. c. 5))

=== Local acts ===
Short title	Citation	Royal assent
Long title
William Brown Nimmo Charitable Trust Order Confirmation Act 1923	13 & 14 Geo. 5. c. i	26 April 1923
An Act to confirm a Provisional Order under the Private Legislation Procedure (Scotland) Act, 1899, (Note: Private Legislation Procedure (Scotland) Act 1899 (62 & 63 Vict. c. 47)) relating to the William Brown Nimmo Charitable Trust.
	William Brown Nimmo Charitable Trust Order 1923	
South Oxfordshire Water and Gas Act 1923 (repealed)	13 & 14 Geo. 5. c. ii	26 April 1923
An Act to consolidate and reduce the capital of the South Oxfordshire Water and Gas Company and to make other provisions with reference to the capital and affairs of the Company. (Repealed by Reading and Berkshire Water, &c. Act 1959 (7 & 8 Eliz. 2. c. xxxiii))
Wallasey Embankment Act 1923 (repealed)	13 & 14 Geo. 5. c. iii	26 April 1923
An Act to confer further powers on the Wallasey Embankment Commissioners to amend the Acts relating to the Commissioners; and for other purposes. (Repealed by County of Merseyside Act 1980 (c. x))
Ministry of Health Provisional Orders Confirmation (No. 1) Act 1923	13 & 14 Geo. 5. c. iv	17 May 1923
An Act to confirm certain Provisional Orders of the Minister of Health relating to Darlington, Parts of Holland, Nottingham, Stockton-on-Tees, Thurrock, Grays and Tilbury Joint Sewerage District, and Wimbledon.
	Darlington Order 1923	
	County of the Parts of Holland Order 1923	
	Nottingham Order 1923	
	Stockton-on-Tees Order 1923	
	Thurrock, Grays and Tilbury Joint Sewerage Order 1923	
	Wimbledon Order 1923	
Ministry of Health Provisional Orders (Sheffield Water Charges) Confirmation Act 1923 (repealed)	13 & 14 Geo. 5. c. v	17 May 1923
An Act to confirm certain Provisional Orders made by the Minister of Health relating to Sheffield. (Repealed by Sheffield Corporation Act 1928 (18 & 19 Geo. 5. c. lxxxvii))
Pier and Harbour Orders Confirmation (No. 1) Act 1923	13 & 14 Geo. 5. c. vi	17 May 1923
An Act to confirm a Provisional Order made by the Minister of Transport under the General Pier and Harbour Act, 1861, (Note: General Pier and Harbour Act 1861 (24 & 25 Vict. c. 45)) relating to Poole Harbour.
	Poole Harbour Order 1923	
London County Council (General Powers) Act 1923 (repealed)	13 & 14 Geo. 5. c. vii	17 May 1923
An Act to confer further powers upon the London County Council; to confer powers upon Metropolitan Borough Councils, and for other purposes. (Repealed by Local Law (Greater London Council and Inner London Boroughs) Order 1965 (SI 1965/540))
Westminster City Council (Cleveland Street Infirmary) Act 1923	13 & 14 Geo. 5. c. viii	17 May 1923
An Act to authorise the Westminster City Council to dispose of the Cleveland Street Infirmary Site as if it were not a disused burial ground, and for other purposes.
South Staffordshire Mines Drainage Act 1923	13 & 14 Geo. 5. c. ix	17 May 1923
An Act to confirm an agreement between the South Staffordshire Mines Drainage Commissioners, the Company of Proprietors of the Birmingham Canal Navigations, and the Public Works Loan Commissioners.
Runcorn District Water Board Act 1923 (repealed)	13 & 14 Geo. 5. c. x	17 May 1923
An Act to constitute the Runcorn District Water Board; to transfer to them the water undertaking of the Runcorn Urban District Council, and for other purposes. (Repealed by Cheshire County Council Act 1980 (c. xiii))
Port of London (Finance) Act 1923 (repealed)	13 & 14 Geo. 5. c. xi	17 May 1923
An Act to increase the borrowing powers of the Port of London Authority. (Repealed by Port of London Act 1928 (18 & 19 Geo. 5. c. xlvii))
Ebbw Vale Urban District Council Act 1923 (repealed)	13 & 14 Geo. 5. c. xii	17 May 1923
An Act to confer further powers on the Ebbw Vale Urban District Council, (Repealed by Gwent Water Board Order 1969 (SI 1969/1475))
Metropolitan Railway (Various Powers) Act 1923	13 & 14 Geo. 5. c. xiii	17 May 1923
An Act to authorise the Metropolitan Railway Company to borrow moneys, and for other purposes.
Thomas Cheshire and Company (Delivery Warrants) Act 1923	13 & 14 Geo. 5. c. xiv	7 June 1923
An Act to enable Messieurs Thomas Cheshire and Company, Limited, to issue transferable certificates and warrants for the delivery of goods, and for other purposes.
Smethwick Corporation (Gas) Act 1923	13 & 14 Geo. 5. c. xv	7 June 1923
An Act to confer further powers on the Mayor, Aldermen, and Burgesses of the Borough of Smethwick with respect to their gas undertaking.
Bootle Corporation Act 1923 (repealed)	13 & 14 Geo. 5. c. xvi	7 June 1923
An Act to make further provision with regard to the collection of rates on premises of low rateable value within the Borough of Bootle, and for other purposes. (Repealed by County of Merseyside Act 1980 (c. x))
General Reversionary and Investment Company Act 1923	13 & 14 Geo. 5. c. xvii	7 June 1923
An Act for removing the limit on the liability of members of the General Reversionary and Investment Company, Limited, and for other purposes.
Bank of England Act 1923	13 & 14 Geo. 5. c. xviii	18 July 1923
An Act to remove doubts arising under the Act 21 Geo. III., Ch. 71, (Note: Saint Christopher-le-Stocks Church, London Act 1781 (21 Geo. 3. c. 71)) and for other purposes.
Great Western Railway (Swansea Harbour Vesting) Act 1923	13 & 14 Geo. 5. c. xix	18 July 1923
An Act to provide for the vesting of the undertaking of the Swansea Harbour Trustees in the Great Western Railway Company, and for other purposes.
Newhaven and Seaford Sea Defences Act 1923 (repealed)	13 & 14 Geo. 5. c. xx	18 July 1923
An to amend the Newhaven and Seaford Sea Defences Act, 1898, (Note: Newhaven and Seaford Sea Defences Act 1898) and for other purposes. (Repealed by Southern Water Authority Act 1980 (c. xxxviii))
Hoylake and West Kirby Gas and Water Act 1923 (repealed)	13 & 14 Geo. 5. c. xxi	18 July 1923
An Act for incorporating and conferring powers on the Hoylake and West Kirby Gas and Water Company. (Repealed by Hoylake and West Kirby Urban District Council Act 1925 (15 & 16 Geo. 5. c. xci))
Caledonian Railway Act 1923	13 & 14 Geo. 5. c. xxii	18 July 1923
An Act to confer powers on the Caledonian Railway Company for the acquisition of land and the maintenance of an hotel and a golf course at Gleneagles, in the County of Perth.
Mersey Docks and Harbour Act 1923	13 & 14 Geo. 5. c. xxiii	18 July 1923
An Act to confer further powers on the Mersey Docks and Harbour Board with reference to their undertaking and the Liverpool Overhead Railway; to authorise the Liverpool Overhead Railway Company to construct accommodation works, and for other purposes, was presented.
South Elmsall and District Gas Act 1923 (repealed)	13 & 14 Geo. 5. c. xxiv	18 July 1923
An Act for incorporating and conferring powers on the South Elmsall and District Gas Company. (Repealed by Royston and Brodsworth Gas Act 1931 (21 & 22 Geo. 5. c. liv))
Oakham Gas and Electricity Act 1923	13 & 14 Geo. 5. c. xxv	18 July 1923
An Act to empower the Oakham Gas Company, Limited, to supply electricity, and for other purposes.
River Wear Watch Act 1923 (repealed)	13 & 14 Geo. 5. c. xxvi	18 July 1923
An Act to confer further powers upon the Commissioners of the River Wear Watch with respect to the levying of tolls, rates, and charges; to alter the qualification of a commissioner, and for other purposes. (Repealed by River Wear Watch (Dissolution) Act 1961 (9 & 10 Eliz. 2. c. xxxi))
Rawmarsh Urban District Council Act 1923 (repealed)	13 & 14 Geo. 5. c. xxvii	18 July 1923
An Act to confer further powers on the Urban District Council of Rawmarsh in regard to their water and gas undertakings and the health and good government of the district. (Repealed by Statute Law (Repeals) Act 1989 (c. 43))
London and North Eastern Railway Act 1923	13 & 14 Geo. 5. c. xxviii	18 July 1923
An Act to empower the London and North Eastern Railway Company to construct new railways and other works and to acquire lands; to extend the time limited by certain Acts for the completion of works and for the compulsory purchase of lands, and for other purposes.
Caledonian Insurance Company's Act 1923	13 & 14 Geo. 5. c. xxix	18 July 1923
An Act to consolidate with Amendments the provisions of the Contract of Co-Partnery Royal Charter Articles of Agreement and Acts of the Caledonian Insurance Company to confer further powers on that Company and for other purposes.
Great Western Railway (Additional Powers) Act 1923	13 & 14 Geo. 5. c. xxx	18 July 1923
An Act for conferring further powers upon the Great Western Railway Company, and for other purposes.
Maidstone Corporation Act 1923	13 & 14 Geo. 5. c. xxxi	18 July 1923
An Act to empower the Mayor, Aldermen, and Burgesses of the Borough of Maidstone to provide and work trolley vehicles and omnibuses; to make further provision with regard to the light railways, electricity, markets, baths, and other undertakings of the Corporation, and the health, local government, and improvement of the borough, and for other purposes.
Stalybridge, Hyde, Mossley and Dukinfield Tramways and Electricity Board Act 1923	13 & 14 Geo. 5. c. xxxii	18 July 1923
An Act to confer further powers on the Stalybridge, Hyde, Mossley, and Dukinfield Tramways and Electricity Board.
Tees Valley Water Act 1923	13 & 14 Geo. 5. c. xxxiii	18 July 1923
An Act to authorise the Tees Valley Water Board to construct additional waterworks; to sanction certain works already executed; to remove certain restrictions on the taking of water from Grassholme reservoir; to extend the limits of supply of the board; to make better provision with regard to their water undertaking, and for other purposes.
Port of London (Dock Charges) Act 1923 (repealed)	13 & 14 Geo. 5. c. xxxiv	18 July 1923
An Act to alter and increase certain dock rates, rents, and charges leviable by the Port of London Authority. (Repealed by Port of London Act 1965 (c. vii))
Ministry of Health Provisional Orders Confirmation (No. 2) Act 1923	13 & 14 Geo. 5. c. xxxv	18 July 1923
An Act to confirm certain Provisional Orders of the Minister of Health relating to Abergavenny, Cardigan, Lindsey, Sedgley, Stoke-on-Trent, and West Hartlepool.
	Abergavennny Order 1923	
	Cardiganshire Order 1923	
	County of the Parts of Lindsey Order 1923	
	Sedgley Order 1923	
	Stoke-on-Trent Order 1923	
	West Hartlepool Order 1923	
Ministry of Health Provisional Orders Confirmation (No. 3) Act 1923	13 & 14 Geo. 5. c. xxxvi	18 July 1923
An Act to confirm certain Provisional Orders of the Minister of Health relating to Hartlepool, Hereford, Huddersfield, Shrewsbury, and Tunbridge Wells.
	Hartlepool Order 1923	
	Hereford Order 1923	
	Huddersfield Order 1923	
	Shrewsbury (Rates) Order 1923	
	Tunbridge Wells Order 1923	
Ministry of Health Provisional Orders Confirmation (No. 4) Act 1923	13 & 14 Geo. 5. c. xxxvii	18 July 1923
An Act to confirm certain Provisional Orders of the Minister of Health relating to Altrincham, Ashton-under-Lyne, Brighouse, Ealing, Hale, Uckfield, and Wath-upon-Dearne.
	Altrincham Order 1923	
	Ashton-under-Lyne Order 1923	
	Brighouse Order 1923	
	Ealing Order 1923	
	Hale Order 1923	
	Uckfield Rural Order 1923	
	Wath-upon-Dearne Order 1923	
Ministry of Health Provisional Orders Confirmation (No. 5) Act 1923	13 & 14 Geo. 5. c. xxxviii	18 July 1923
An Act to confirm certain Provisional Orders of the Minister of Health relating to Denbigh, Gosport, Keighley, Leicester, Rochester and Chatham Joint Sewerage District, and Rotherham.
	County of Denbigh Order 1923	
	Gosport Order 1923	
	Keighley Order 1923	
	Leicester Order 1923	
	Rochester and Chatham Joint Sewerage Order 1923	
	Rotherham Order 1923	
Ministry of Heath Provisional Orders Confirmation (No. 6) Act 1923	13 & 14 Geo. 5. c. xxxix	18 July 1923
An Act to confirm certain Provisional Orders of the Minister of Health relating to Blackpool, Chiswick, Crayford, Halifax, Margate, Swindon, and Wigan.
	Blackpool (Rates) Order 1923	
	Chiswick Order 1923	
	Crayford Order 1923	
	Halifax Order 1923	
	Margate Order 1923	
	Swindon Order 1923	
	Wigan Order 1923	
Ministry of Health Provisional Orders Confirmation (No. 7) Act 1923	13 & 14 Geo. 5. c. xl	18 July 1923
An Act to confirm certain Provisional Orders of the Minister of Health relating to Basingstoke, Bath, Blackpool, Bungay, Ilkley, and Scarborough.
	Basingstoke Rural Order 1923	
	Bath Order 1923	
	Blackpool Order (No. 2) 1923	
	Bungay Order 1923	
	Ilkley Order 1923	
	Scarborough Order 1923	
Ministry of Health Provisional Orders Confirmation (No. 8) Act 1923	13 & 14 Geo. 5. c. xli	18 July 1923
An Act to confirm certain Provisional Orders of the Minister of Health relating to Bradford, Mid Sussex Water Board, Northwich, Scarborough, Stourbridge and District Water Board and Thornton Joint Hospital District and Keighley and Bingley Joint Hospital District.
	Bradford Order 1923	
	Mid Sussex Order 1923	
	Northwich Order 1923	
	Scarborough Order (No. 2) 1923	
	Stourbridge and District Water Board Order 1923	
	Thornton Joint Hospital Order Rescission Order 1923	
Ministry of Health Provisional Order Confirmation (Frimley and Farnborough District Water) Act 1923	13 & 14 Geo. 5. c. xlii	18 July 1923
An Act to confirm a Provisional Order of the Minister of Health relating to the Frimley and Farnborough District Water Company.
	Frimley and Farnborough District Water Order 1923	
Ministry of Health Provisional Order Confirmation (Calne Water) Act 1923	13 & 14 Geo. 5. c. xliii	18 July 1923
An Act to confirm a Provisional Order of the Minister of Health relating to the Calne Waterworks Company, Limited.
	Calne Water Order 1923	
Ministry of Health Provisional Order Confirmation (Bridlington Extension) Act 1923	13 & 14 Geo. 5. c. xliv	18 July 1923
An Act to confirm a Provisional Order of the Ministry of Health relating to Bridlington.
	Bridlington (Extension) Order 1923	
Ministry of Health Provisional Order Confirmation (Bridport Extension) Act 1923	13 & 14 Geo. 5. c. xlv	18 July 1923
An Act to confirm a Provisional Order of the Minister of Health relating to Bridport.
	Bridport (Extension) Order 1923	
Ministry of Health Provisional Order Confirmation (Brighton Extension) Act 1923	13 & 14 Geo. 5. c. xlvi	18 July 1923
An Act to confirm a Provisional Order of the Ministry of Health relating to Brighton.
	Brighton (Extension) Order 1923	
Bradford Corporation (Trolley Vehicles) Order (1922) Confirmation Act 1923 (repealed)	13 & 14 Geo. 5. c. xlvii	18 July 1923
An Act to confirm a Provisional Order made by the Minister of Transport under the Bradford Corporation Act, 1910, (Note: Bradford Corporation Act 1910 (10 Edw. 7 & 1 Geo. 5. c. cxvii)) relating to Bradford Corporation Trolley Vehicles. (Repealed by West Yorkshire Act 1980 (c. xiv))
	Bradford Corporation (Trolley Vehicles) Order 1922	
Buchanan Trust Order Confirmation Act 1923	13 & 14 Geo. 5. c. xlviii	18 July 1923
An Act to confirm a Provisional Order under the Private Legislation Procedure (Scotland) Act, 1899, relating to the Buchanan Trust.
	Buchanan Trust Order 1923 Provisional Order to re-incorporate the Governors of the Buchanan Trust; to confer further powers on the Governors of the Trust; to provide for the management of its affairs; and for other purposes.	
Fraserburgh Harbour Order Confirmation Act 1923 (repealed)	13 & 14 Geo. 5. c. xlix	18 July 1923
An Act to confirm a Provisional Order under the Private Legislation Procedure (Scotland) Act, 1899, relating to Fraserburgh Harbour. (Repealed by Fraserburgh Harbour Order Confirmation Act 1975 (c. xiii))
	Fraserburgh Harbour Order 1923 Provisional Order for enabling the Provost Magistrates and Councillors of the Burgh of Fraserburgh in the County of Aberdeen to guarantee repayment of money lent to the Fraserburgh Harbour Commissioners by the Treasury; and for other purposes.	
South West of Scotland Blind Asylum Order Confirmation Act 1923	13 & 14 Geo. 5. c. l	18 July 1923
An Act to confirm a Provisional Order under the Private Legislation Procedure (Scotland) Act, 1899, relating to the Royal Glasgow Asylum for the Blind.
	South West of Scotland Blind Asylum Order 1923 Provisional Order to vest in the Corporation of the City of Glasgow the Royal Glasgow Asylum for the Blind for the purposes of a joint scheme for the administration of the Blind Persons Act, 1920; (Note: Blind Persons Act 1920 (10 & 11 Geo. 5. c. 49)) and for other purposes.	
Airdrie, Coatbridge and District Water Board Order Confirmation Act 1923	13 & 14 Geo. 5. c. li	18 July 1923
An Act to confirm a Provisional Order under the Private Legislation Procedure (Scotland) Act, 1899, relating to the Airdrie, Coatbridge, and District Water Board.
	Airdrie, Coatbridge and District Water Board Order 1923	
Glasgow Corporation Order Confirmation Act 1923	13 & 14 Geo. 5. c. lii	18 July 1923
An Act to confirm a Provisional Order under the Private Legislation Procedure (Scotland) Act, 1899, relating to Glasgow Corporation.
	Glasgow Corporation Order 1923	
Greenock Corporation Order Confirmation Act 1923	13 & 14 Geo. 5. c. liii	18 July 1923
An Act to confirm a Provisional Order under the Private Legislation Procedure (Scotland) Act, 1899, relating to Greenock Corporation.
	Greenock Corporation Order 1923	
North Berwick Burgh Extension Order Confirmation Act 1923	13 & 14 Geo. 5. c. liv	18 July 1923
An Act to confirm a Provisional Order under the Private Legislation Procedure (Scotland) Act, 1899, relating to North Berwick Burgh Extension.
	North Berwick Burgh Extension Order 1923	
Hawkshead Mission Chapel Charity Scheme Confirmation Act 1923	13 & 14 Geo. 5. c. lv	18 July 1923
An Act to confirm a Scheme of the Charity Commissioners for the application or management of the charity consisting of the Mission Chapel, and the endowments thereof, in the Parish of Hawkshead, in the County of Lancaster.
	Hawkshead Mission Chapel Charity Scheme.	
Lucas's Hospital Charity Scheme Confirmation Act 1923 (repealed)	13 & 14 Geo. 5. c. lvi	18 July 1923
An Act to confirm a Scheme of the Charity Commissioners for the application or management of the Charity called or known as Henry Lucas's Hospital at Wokingham in the County of Berks. (Repealed by Statute Law (Repeals) Act 2013 (c. 2))
	Scheme for the application or management of the Charity called or known as Henry Lucas's Hospital at Wokingham in the County of Berks founded by Will dated 11th June 1663 and regulated by Letters Patent dated 18th January 18 Car. II.	
Tancred's Charities Scheme Confirmation Act 1923	13 & 14 Geo. 5. c. lvii	18 July 1923
An Act to confirm a Scheme of the Charity Commissioners for the application or management of the Charities known as Tancred's Charities.
	Scheme for the application or management of Tancred's Charities regulated by the Act of Parliament 2 Geo. III. c. 15 (Private) (Note: Tancred's Charities Act 1762 (2 Geo. 3. c. 15 Pr.)) by a Scheme of the Charity Commissioners of 24th May 1870 by the Act of Parliament 34 & 35 Vict. c. 117 (Note: Tancred's Charities Act 1871 (34 & 35 Vict. c. 117)) by a Scheme of the Charity Commissioners made in pursuance of the last-mentioned Act on the twenty-first August eighteen hundred and seventy-two and by the Tancred Charities Scheme Confirmation Act 1899 (62 & 63 Vict. c. cclxxviii.). (Note: Tancred's Charities Scheme Confirmation Act 1899 (62 & 63 Vict. c. cclxxvii))	
Provisional Order (Marriages) Confirmation Act 1923 (repealed)	13 & 14 Geo. 5. c. lviii	18 July 1923
An Act to confirm a Provisional Order made by one of His Majesty's Principal Secretaries of State under the Provisional Order (Marriages) Act 1905. (Note: Provisional Order (Marriages) Act 1905 (5 Edw. 7. c. 23)) (Repealed by Statute Law (Repeals) Act 1977 (c. 18))
	Saxthorpe and Corpusty Order.	
Oyster Fishery (Roach River) Provisional Order Confirmation Act 1923	13 & 14 Geo. 5. c. lix	31 July 1923
An Act to confirm a Provisional Order under the Sea Fisheries Act 1868 (Note: Sea Fisheries Act 1868 (31 & 32 Vict. c. 45)) and the Acts amending the same relating to an oyster fishery in the River Roach.
	Roach River Fishery Order 1923 Order for conferring on the Roach River Oyster Fishery Company Limited of Burnham-on-Crouch in the County of Essex a right of Several Oyster Fishery in the River Roach in the County of Esseх.	
Pier and Harbour Orders Confirmation (No. 2) Act 1923	13 & 14 Geo. 5. c. lx	31 July 1923
An Act to confirm certain Provisional Orders made by the Minister of Transport under the General Pier and Harbour Act 1861 relating to Bridgwater Colwyn Bay and St. Anne'son-the-Sea.
	Bridgwater Port and Navigation Order 1923 Provisional Order for amending the Bridgwater Port and Navigation Order 1908.	
	Colwyn Bay (Victoria) Pier Order 1923 Provisional Order for the transfer of the undertaking of the Victoria Pier and Pavilion Company (Colwyn Bay) Limited to the Colwyn Bay and Colwyn Urban District Council and for other purposes in connection therewith.	
	St. Anne's-on-the-Sea Pier Order 1923 Provisional Order for varying certain rates chargeable in respect of the use of Saint Anne's-on-the-Sea Pier and for other purposes.	
Pier and Harbour Order Confirmation (No. 3) Act 1923	13 & 14 Geo. 5. c. lxi	31 July 1923
An Act to confirm a Provisional Order made by the Minister of Transport under the General Pier and Harbour Act 1861 relating to Berwick-upon-Tweed Harbour.
	Berwick-upon-Tweed Harbour Order 1923 Order conferring powers upon the Berwick Harbour Commissioners and amending the Acts and Order relating to the Harbour of Berwick-upon-Tweed and for other purposes.	
Tramways Provisional Orders Act 1923	13 & 14 Geo. 5. c. lxii	31 July 1923
An Act to confirm certain Provisional Orders made by the Minister of Transport under the Tramways Act 1870 (Note: Tramways Act 1870 (33 & 34 Vict. c. 78)) relating to Leicester Corporation Tramways and Rochdale Corporation Tramways.
	Leicester Corporation Tramways Order 1923 Order authorising the Corporation of Leicester to construct additional Tramways in the City of Leicester and for other purposes.	
	Rochdale Corporation Tramways Order 1923 Order authorising the Mayor Aldermen and Burgesses of the borough of Rochdale to construct an additional tramway in the said borough.	
Ministry of Health Provisional Orders Confirmation (No. 9) Act 1923	13 & 14 Geo. 5. c. lxiii	31 July 1923
An Act to confirm certain Provisional Orders of the Minister of Health relating to Cardiff Eastern Valleys (Monmouthshire) Joint Sewerage District Isle of Thanet Joint Hospital District Poole Sheffield and Goole.
	Cardiff Order 1923 Provisional Order made in pursuance of Sections 59 and 87 of the Local Government Act 1888 (Note: Local Government Act 1888 (51 & 52 Vict. c. 41)) to amend the Cardiff (Extension) Order 1921.	
	Goole Order 1923 Provisional Order for altering a Local Act (Note: Eastern Valleys (Monmouthshire) Joint Sewerage Board Act 1915 (5 & 6 Geo. 5. c. xlviii)) and a Confirming Act. (Note: Local Government Board's Provisional Order Confirmation (No. 13) Act 1912 (2 & 3 Geo. 5. c. clxi))	
Ministry of Health Provisional Orders Confirmation (No. 10) Act 1923	13 & 14 Geo. 5. c. lxiv	31 July 1923
An Act to confirm certain Provisional Orders of the Minister of Health relating to Poulton-le-Fylde Todmorden and Willenhall.
	Poulton-le-Fylde Order 1923 Provisional Order to enable the Urban District Council of Poulton-le-Fylde to put in force the Compulsory Clauses of the Lands Clauses Acts.	
	Willenhall Order 1923 Provisional Order for partially repealing altering and amending the Todmorden Corporation Act 1906. (Note: Todmorden Corporation Act 1906 (6 Edw. 7. c. clxxvi))	
Church of Scotland Ministers' and Scottish University Professors' Widows' Fund Order Confirmation Act 1923 (repealed)	13 & 14 Geo. 5. c. lxv	31 July 1923
An Act to confirm a Provisional Order under the Private Legislation Procedure (Scotland) Act, 1899, relating to the Church of Scotland Ministers' and Scottish University Professors' Widows' Fund. (Repealed by Statute Law (Repeals) Act 1986 (c. 12))
	Church of Scotland Ministers' and Scottish University Professors' Widows' Fund Order 1923	
London County Council (Money) Act 1923 (repealed)	13 & 14 Geo. 5. c. lxvi	31 July 1923
An Act to regulate the expenditure on capital account and lending of money by the London County Council during the financial period from the first day of April, one thousand nine hundred and twenty-three, to the thirtieth day of September, one thousand nine hundred and twenty-four, and for other purposes. (Repealed by London County Council (Loans) Act 1955 (4 & 5 Eliz. 2. c. xxvi))
Essex County Council (Barking Bridge) Act 1923	13 & 14 Geo. 5. c. lxvii	31 July 1923
An Act to empower the Essex County Council to construct a new bridge over the River Roding at Barking in the county of Essex and for other purposes.
Mitcham Urban District Council Act 1923	13 & 14 Geo. 5. c. lxviii	31 July 1923
An Act to vest in the urban district council of Mitcham certain common lands and fair rights in their district and to make further provision with regard to the improvement health local government and finance of the district and for other purposes.
Greenock Corporation (Electricity) Act 1923 (repealed)	13 & 14 Geo. 5. c. lxix	31 July 1923
An Act to confer further powers on the corporation of Greenock in relation to their electricity undertaking. (Repealed by South of Scotland Electricity Order Confirmation Act 1956 (4 & 5 Eliz. 2. c. xciv))
Potteries and North Staffordshire Tramways and Light Railways Act 1923	13 & 14 Geo. 5. c. lxx	31 July 1923
An Act to make provisions with reference to the undertakings of the Potteries Electric Traction Company Limited and the North Staffordshire Tramways Company Limited to confer powers upon those companies and for other purposes.
Birkenhead Corporation Act 1923	13 & 14 Geo. 5. c. lxxi	31 July 1923
An Act to confer upon the corporation of Birkenhead further powers with respect to their water tramway gas and electricity undertakings to consolidate the local rates leviable in the borough to make better provision for the health local government and finance of the borough and for other purposes.
Bromborough Dock Act 1923	13 & 14 Geo. 5. c. lxxii	31 July 1923
An Act to authorise Lever Brothers Limited to construct a dock and other works in the urban district of Bebington and Bromborough in the county of Chester and for other purposes.
South Staffordshire Mond Gas Act 1923	13 & 14 Geo. 5. c. lxxiii	31 July 1923
An Act to confirm an Agreement between the South Staffordshire Mines Drainage Commissioners the Company of Proprietors of the Birmingham Canal Navigations and the Public Works Loan Commissioners.
Thornton Urban District Council Act 1923	13 & 14 Geo. 5. c. lxxiv	31 July 1923
An Act to empower the Thornton Urban District Council to construct a promenade street works a jetty and other works to make further provision with regard to the health improvement and good government of the district the assessment and levying of rates and for other purposes.
Rugby Urban District Council Act 1923	13 & 14 Geo. 5. c. lxxv	31 July 1923
An Act to empower the urban district council of Rugby to construct additional waterworks and to make further provision in regard to the water and electricity undertakings of the Council and the health local government and improvement of the district and for other purposes.
West Gloucestershire Water Act 1923	13 & 14 Geo. 5. c. lxxvi	31 July 1923
An Act for authorising the West Gloucestershire Water Company to construct new works and to borrow further moneys for increasing the charges of the Company and for other purposes.
Oldham and Rochdale Corporations Water Act 1923	13 & 14 Geo. 5. c. lxxvii	31 July 1923
An Act to transfer to the Corporations of Oldham and Rochdale as part of their water undertakings certain waterworks rights and powers of the Rochdale Canal Company to empower the said Corporations to construct new waterworks and for other purposes.
Plymouth Corporation Act 1923	13 & 14 Geo. 5. c. lxxviii	31 July 1923
An Act to confer further powers upon the mayor aldermen and burgesses of the borough of Plymouth in regard to their water gas electricity and tramway and light railway undertakings to empower them to construct street improvements and to purchase the bridges known as the "Stonehouse Bridge" and the "Stonehouse Mill Bridge" to constitute the Corporation the port sanitary authority for the port of Plymouth to provide for the transfer to the Corporation of the Devon and Cornwall Sanatorium at Didworthy to make further provision in regard to the health local government and improvement of the borough and for other purposes.
Mid Kent Water Act 1923	13 & 14 Geo. 5. c. lxxix	31 July 1923
An Act for authorising the Mid Kent Water Company to construct new waterworks for conferring further powers upon the Company and for other purposes.
Felixstowe Dock and Railway Act 1923	13 & 14 Geo. 5. c. lxxx	31 July 1923
An Act to authorise the Felixstowe Dock and Railway Company to levy additional rates tolls and charges to purchase additional lands for the provision of workmen's dwellings to redeem debenture stock and for other purposes.
West Bromwich Corporation Act 1923 (repealed)	13 & 14 Geo. 5. c. lxxxi	31 July 1923
An Act to confer powers upon the mayor aldermen and burgesses of the borough of West Bromwich with regard to the consolidation of rates and for other purposes. (Repealed by West Bromwich Corporation Act 1969 (c. lix))
London, Midland and Scottish Railway Act 1923	13 & 14 Geo. 5. c. lxxxii	31 July 1923
An Act to confer additional powers upon the London Midland and Scottish Railway Company for the construction of railway widenings to authorise that Company and the Midland and Great Northern Railways Joint Committee to acquire lands and for other purposes.
Southern Railway Act 1923	13 & 14 Geo. 5. c. lxxxiii	31 July 1923
An Act to empower the Southern Railway Company to construct a floating dry dock and other works and to acquire lands to extend the time limited by certain Acts for the completion of works and for the compulsory purchase of lands to abandon a portion of the East Southsea Branch Railway to transfer to the said Company the undertaking of the Lynton and Barnstaple Railway Company and to the said Company and the London Midland and Scottish Railway Company the undertaking of the Somerset and Dorset Railway Company and for other purposes.
Seaham Harbour Dock Act 1923	13 & 14 Geo. 5. c. lxxxiv	31 July 1923
An Act to empower the Seaham Harbour Dock Company to construct a dock extension and other works to confer upon that Company additional borrowing powers and for other purposes.
Swanage Gas and Electricity Act 1923	13 & 14 Geo. 5. c. lxxxv	31 July 1923
An Act to provide for the transfer of the undertaking of the Swanage Electricity Supply Company Limited to the Swanage Gas Company to confer further powers on the Swanage Gas Company and for other purposes.
Lytham Saint Anne's Corporation Act 1923	13 & 14 Geo. 5. c. lxxxvi	31 July 1923
An Act to provide for the consolidation, with amendments, of the local Acts and Orders in force in the Borough of Lytham Saint Anne's; to confer further powers upon the Mayor, Aldermen, and Burgesses of the Borough in relation to their tramway, gas, electricity, and market undertakings and for the acquisition of additional lands; to make further provision for the improvement, health, and good government of th6 Borough, and for other purposes.
Dover Harbour Act 1923 (repealed)	13 & 14 Geo. 5. c. lxxxvii	31 July 1923
An Act to authorise the transfer by the Admiralty to the Dover Harbour Board of the Admiralty Harbour at Dover and for other purposes. (Repealed by Dover Harbour Consolidation Act 1954 (2 & 3 Eliz. 2. c. iv))
Bournemouth-Swanage Motor Road and Ferry Act 1923	13 & 14 Geo. 5. c. lxxxviii	31 July 1923
An Act to incorporate and confer powers upon the Bournemouth-Swanage Motor Road and Ferry Company and for other purposes.
Barnsley Corporation Act 1923	13 & 14 Geo. 5. c. lxxxix	31 July 1923
An Act to empower the mayor aldermen and burgesses of the county borough of Barnsley to construct additional waterworks and to improve the access to their electricity works and to make further provision for the improvement health and good government of the borough and for other purposes.
Broadstairs and St. Peter's Urban District Council Act 1923 (repealed)	13 & 14 Geo. 5. c. xc	2 August 1923
An Act to make further provision in regard to the water undertaking of the urban district council of Broadstairs and St. Peter's and the health local government and improvement of their district and for other purposes. (Repealed by County of Kent Act 1981 (c. xviii))
Chelmsford Corporation Water Act 1923	13 & 14 Geo. 5. c. xci	2 August 1923
An Act to empower the mayor aldermen and burgesses of the borough of Chelmsford to construct additional waterworks to confer further powers upon them in regard to their water undertaking and for other purposes.
Croydon Corporation Act 1923 (repealed)	13 & 14 Geo. 5. c. xcii	2 August 1923
An Act to authorise the mayor aldermen and burgesses of the county borough of Croydon to execute a street improvement to consolidate the rates of the said borough and for other purposes. (Repealed by Croydon Corporation Act 1960 (8 & 9 Eliz. 2. c. xl))
Wakefield Corporation Act 1923 (repealed)	13 & 14 Geo. 5. c. xciii	2 August 1923
An Act to confer further powers upon the mayor aldermen and citizens of the city of Wakefield with regard to their water undertaking and to provide for the consolidation of rates and for other purposes. (Repealed by West Yorkshire Act 1980 (c. xiv))
West Somerset Mineral Railway (Abandonment) Act 1923	13 & 14 Geo. 5. c. xciv	2 August 1923
An Act for the abandonment of the undertaking and the winding-up and dissolution of the West Somerset Mineral Railway Company and for matters incidental thereto.
West Hartlepool Corporation Act 1923	13 & 14 Geo. 5. c. xcv	2 August 1923
An Act to empower the mayor aldermen and burgesses of the borough of West Hartlepool to provide and work trolley vehicles and for other purposes.
Shropshire, Worcestershire and Staffordshire Electric Power Act 1923 (repealed)	13 & 14 Geo. 5. c. xcvi	2 August 1923
An Act to confer further powers upon the Shropshire Worcestershire and Staffordshire Electric Power Company to make further provisions with reference to the separate undertaking of that Company and for other purposes. (Repealed by Shropshire, Worcestershire and Staffordshire Electric Power (Consolidation) Act 1938 (1 & 2 Geo. 6. c. lviii))
Wimbledon and Sutton Railway Act 1923	13 & 14 Geo. 5. c. xcvii	2 August 1923
An Act to extend the time for the compulsory purchase of lands for and for the construction and completion of the railways and works authorised by the Wimbledon and Sutton Railway Act 1910 (Note: Wimbledon and Sutton Railway Act 1910 (10 Edw. 7 & 1 Geo. 5. c. xlvii)) to raise additional capital and for other purposes.
West Riding of Yorkshire County Council (Drainage) Act 1923 (repealed)	13 & 14 Geo. 5. c. xcviii	2 August 1923
An Act to constitute the county council of the west riding of Yorkshire the drainage authority for the administrative county of the west riding of Yorkshire and for other purposes. (Repealed by Land Drainage (Amendment) Act 1976 (c. 17))
Chesterfield Corporation Act 1923	13 & 14 Geo. 5. c. xcix	2 August 1923
An Act to consolidate with amendments the local Acts in force within the borough of Chesterfield to confer further powers upon the mayor aldermen and burgesses of that borough in relation to their several undertakings the construction of street improvements the provision of recreation grounds and other matters to discontinue the Chesterfield racecourse to make better provision for the health local government and improvement of the borough and the levying of rates therein and for other purposes.
Nottingham Corporation Act 1923	13 & 14 Geo. 5. c. c	2 August 1923
An Act to authorise the mayor aldermen and citizens of the city of Nottingham and county of the same city to construct street works tramways and waterworks to increase tramway and water charges to extend the area of supply for electricity purposes to provide for the discontinuance of burials in the Nottingham General Cemetery to confer further powers with regard to streets and buildings and the health and good government of the city and for other purposes.
City and South London Railway Act 1923	13 & 14 Geo. 5. c. ci	2 August 1923
An Act for empowering the City and South London Railway Company to extend their railway and to confer further financial and other powers on the Company to confer powers on the London Electric Railway Company the Metropolitan District Railway Company and the Central London Railway Company and for other purposes.
Torquay Corporation Act 1923	13 & 14 Geo. 5. c. cii	2 August 1923
An Act to empower the mayor aldermen and burgesses of the borough of Torquay to construct street improvements to confer further powers upon the Corporation with regard to the health local government and improvement of the borough and with regard to their water electricity and gas undertakings to amalgamate the parishes and consolidate the rates of the borough and for other purposes.
London Electric Railway Act 1923	13 & 14 Geo. 5. c. ciii	2 August 1923
An Act to empower the London Electric Railway Company to construct new railways subways and works to raise additional capital to confer further powers on that Company and on the Metropolitan District Central London and City and South London Railway Companies and for other purposes.
Chatham Corporation Act 1923 (repealed)	13 & 14 Geo. 5. c. civ	2 August 1923
An Act to empower the mayor aldermen and burgesses of the borough of Chatham to construct street improvements and to make further provision with regard to the health local government and improvement of the borough and for other purposes. (Repealed by County of Kent Act 1981 (c. xviii))
Morley Corporation Act 1923	13 & 14 Geo. 5. c. cv	2 August 1923
An Act to confer further powers upon the mayor aldermen and burgesses of the borough of Morley with regard to their water undertaking to make further provision with regard to the health improvement and good government of the borough and the consolidation of rates and for other purposes.
Macclesfield Corporation Act 1923	13 & 14 Geo. 5. c. cvi	2 August 1923
An Act to confer further powers upon the mayor aldermen and burgesses of the borough of Macclesfield with regard to the construction of waterworks to make further provision with regard to the health improvement and good government of the borough and the consolidation of rates and for other purposes.
Stoke-on-Trent Corporation Act 1923	13 & 14 Geo. 5. c. cvii	2 August 1923
An Act to consolidate the Acts and Orders relating to the electricity undertaking of the mayor aldermen and burgesses of the borough of Stoke-on-Trent and to confer further powers upon them with respect thereto to consolidate the local rates in the borough to make better provision for the health local government and finances of the borough and for other purposes.
Robert Gordon's Colleges and Aberdeen Endowments Trust Order Confirmation Act 1923	13 & 14 Geo. 5. c. cviii	2 August 1923
An Act to confirm a Provisional Order under the Private Legislation Procedure (Scotland) Act 1899 relating to Robert Gordon's Colleges and the Aberdeen Endowments Trust.
	Robert Gordon's Colleges and Aberdeen Endowments Trust Order 1923 Provisional Order to amend the Robert Gordon's Technical College and Aberdeen Endowments Trust Order 1909 to confer further powers on the Governors of Robert Gordon's Colleges and the Trustee of the Aberdeen Endowments Trust and for other purposes.	

=== Sources ===
- Local and Personal Laws – via Google Books.

== See also ==
- List of acts of the Parliament of the United Kingdom
