= Agricultural Holdings (Scotland) Act 1949 =

Act of the Parliament of the United Kingdom

Agricultural Holdings (Scotland) Act 1949 (Note: Section 101(1).)
- Act of Parliament
- Parliament of the United Kingdom
- Long title: An Act to consolidate the Agricultural Holdings (Scotland) Act, 1923, Part II of the Small Landholders and Agricultural Holdings (Scotland) Act, 1931, Part I of the Agriculture (Scotland) Act, 1948, and certain other enactments relating to agricultural holdings, save, with respect to rights to compensation, in their application to certain cases determined by past events.
- Citation: 12, 13 & 14 Geo. 6. c. 75
- Territorial extent: Scotland (Note: Section 101(2).)

Dates
- Royal assent: 24 November 1949
- Commencement: 24 November 1949 (Note: The Acts of Parliament (Commencement) Act 1793.)
- Repealed: 25 September 1991
Other legislation
Amends	See § Repealed enactments
Repeals/revokes	See § Repealed enactments
Amended by	Crown Estate Act 1961; Statute Law (Repeals) Act 1973; Statute Law (Repeals) Act 1986; Age of Legal Capacity (Scotland) Act 1991
Repealed by	Agricultural Holdings (Scotland) Act 1991
Relates to	Agricultural Holdings Act 1948

Status: Repealed

Text of statute as originally enacted

Revised text of statute as amended

The Agricultural Holdings (Scotland) Act 1949 (12, 13 & 14 Geo. 6. c. 75) was an act of the Parliament of the United Kingdom that consolidated enactments related to agricultural holdings in Scotland.

The Agricultural Holdings Act 1948 (11 & 12 Geo. 6. c. 63) made similar provisions for England and Wales.

== Provisions ==
=== Repealed enactments ===
Section 97 of the act repealed 10 enactments, listed in the eighth schedule to the act.

Citation	Short title	Extent of repeal
13 & 14 Geo. 5. c. 10	Agricultural Holdings (Scotland) Act 1923	The whole act.
13 & 14 Geo. 5. c. 25	Agriculture (Amendment) Act 1923	The whole act.
19 & 20 Geo. 5. c. 25	Local Government (Scotland) Act 1929	In section forty-eight, the words from "or by an arbiter" to the end of the section.
21 & 22 Geo. 5. c. 42	Agricultural Marketing Act 1931	In section nineteen, in paragraph (b) the words "or other occupier of an agricultural holding", and the words from "or by an arbiter" to the end of the paragraph.
21 & 22 Geo. 5. c. 44	Small Landholders and Agricultural Holdings (Scotland) Act 1931	Part II. In section forty-one, in subsection (1) the words from "and the Small Landholders Acts" to the end of the subsection.
1 Edw. 8 & 1 Geo. 6. c. 70	Agriculture Act 1937	Section five, so far as it relates to agricultural holdings.
2 & 3 Geo. 6. c. 48	Agricultural Development Act 1939	In section thirty, subsection (2) so far as it relates to agricultural holdings.
6 & 7 Geo. 6. c. 16	Agriculture (Miscellaneous Provisions) Act 1943	Section twenty-one.
9 & 10 Geo. 6. c. 73	Hill Farming Act 1946	In section thirty-nine, in subsection (1), paragraph (c).
11 & 12 Geo. 6. c. 45	Agriculture (Scotland) Act 1948	Part I, except section eight in relation to notices to quit given before the commencement of this Act and except section twenty-five so far as relating to the provisions therein mentioned so far as continued in force by this Act. In section eighty-four, the words "the Agricultural Holdings (Scotland) Acts, 1923 and 1931, or". The First and Second Schedules. In the Third Schedule, in paragraph 2, the words from "or a direction" to "permanent pasture" where those words first occur, and in paragraph 4, the words from the beginning to "this Act". The Fourth and Ninth Schedules.

== Subsequent developments ==
The whole act was repealed by section 88(2) of, and schedule 13 to, the Agricultural Holdings (Scotland) Act 1991 (1991 c. 55), which came into force on 25 September 1991.
