= Agricultural Holdings Act 1923 =

Act of the Parliament of the United Kingdom

Agricultural Holdings Act 1923 (Note: Section 58(2).)
- Act of Parliament
- Parliament of the United Kingdom
- Long title: An Act to consolidate certain enactments relating to Agricultural Holdings in England and Wales.
- Citation: 13 & 14 Geo. 5. c. 9
- Territorial extent: England and Wales (Note: Long title.)

Dates
- Royal assent: 7 June 1923
- Commencement: 7 July 1923 (Note: Section 58(1).)
- Repealed: 30 July 1948
Other legislation
Amends	See § Repealed enactments
Repeals/revokes	See § Repealed enactments
Amended by	Agriculture (Amendment) Act 1923; Settled Land Act 1925
Repealed by	Agricultural Holdings Act 1948
Relates to	Agricultural Holdings (Scotland) Act 1923

Status: Repealed

Text of statute as originally enacted

The Agricultural Holdings Act 1923 (13 & 14 Geo. 5. c. 9) was an act of the Parliament of the United Kingdom that consolidated enactments related to agricultural holdings in England and Wales.

The Agricultural Holdings (Scotland) Act 1923 (13 & 14 Geo. 5. c. 10) made similar provisions for Scotland.

== Provisions ==
=== Repealed enactments ===
Section 58(3) of the act repealed 7 enactments, listed in the fourth schedule to the act.

Citation	Short title	Extent of repeal
8 Edw. 7. c. 28	Agricultural Holdings Act 1908	The whole act.
2 & 3 Geo. 5. c. 21	Agricultural Holdings Act 1913	The whole act.
9 & 10 Geo. 5. c. 63	Agricultural Land Sales (Restriction of Notices to Quit) Act 1919	The whole act.
10 & 11 Geo. 5. c. 76	Agriculture Act 1920	The whole of Part II. of the act except section eleven; section thirty-three, except the definition of "agricultural committee"; and the First Schedule.
11 & 12 Geo. 5. c. 17	Agriculture (Amendment) Act 1921	The whole act.
11 & 12 Geo. 5. c. 48	Corn Production Acts (Repeal) Act 1921	Section five.
12 & 13 Geo. 5. c. 51	Allotments Act 1922	Subsection (6) of section twenty-two.

== Subsequent developments ==
The whole act was repealed by section 98 of, and the eighth schedule to, the Agricultural Holdings Act 1948 (11 & 12 Geo. 6. c. 63), which came into force on 30 July 1948.
