= Agricultural Holdings Act 1948 =

Act of the Parliament of the United Kingdom

Agricultural Holdings Act 1948 (Note: Section 102(1).)
- Act of Parliament
- Parliament of the United Kingdom
- Long title: An Act to consolidate the Agricultural Holdings Act, 1923, Part III of the Agriculture Act, 1947, and certain other enactments relating to agricultural holdings, save, with respect to rights to compensation, in their application to certain cases determined by reference to past events.
- Citation: 11 & 12 Geo. 6. c. 63
- Territorial extent: England and Wales (Note: Section 102(2).)

Dates
- Royal assent: 30 July 1948
- Commencement: 30 July 1948 (Note: The Acts of Parliament (Commencement) Act 1793.)
- Repealed: 18 June 1986
Other legislation
Amends	See § Repealed enactments
Repeals/revokes	See § Repealed enactments
Amended by	Married Women (Restraint upon Anticipation) Act 1949; Mental Health Act 1959; Crown Estate Act 1961; Rent Act 1968; Statute Law (Repeals) Act 1969; Land Charges Act 1972; Agricultural Holdings (Notices to Quit) Act 1977
Repealed by	Agricultural Holdings Act 1986
Relates to	Agriculture (Scotland) Act 1948; Agricultural Holdings (Scotland) Act 1949

Status: Repealed

Text of statute as originally enacted

The Agricultural Holdings Act 1948 (11 & 12 Geo. 6. c. 63) was an act of the Parliament of the United Kingdom passed by the Labour government of Prime Minister Clement Attlee that consolidated. It provided tenant farmers with security of tenure for life.

== Provisions ==
=== Repealed enactments ===
Section 98 of the act repealed 11 enactments, listed in the eighth schedule to the act.

Citation	Short title	Extent of repeal
13 & 14 Geo. 5 c. 9	Agricultural Holdings Act 1923	The whole act.
13 & 14 Geo. 5 c. 25	Agriculture (Amendment) Act 1923	The whole act.
15 & 16 Geo. 5 c. 20	Law of Property Act 1925	In section one hundred and forty, the proviso to subsection (2).
16 & 17 Geo. 5 c. 11	Law of Property (Amendment) Act 1926	Section two.
19 & 20 Geo. 5 c. 17	Local Government Act 1929	In the Tenth Schedule, paragraph 17.
24 & 25 Geo. 5 c. 14	Arbitration Act 1934	Section eighteen and the proviso to section nineteen.
1 Edw. 8 & 1 Geo. 6 c. 70	Agriculture Act 1937	Section five, so far as it relates to agricultural holdings.
2 & 3 Geo. 6 c. 48	Agricultural Development Act 1939	In section thirty, subsection (2) so far as it relates to agricultural holdings.
3 & 4 Geo. 6 c. 14	Agriculture (Miscellaneous War Provisions) Act 1940	In section fifteen, subsection (2) so far as it relates to agricultural holdings.
3 & 4 Geo. 6 c. 50	Agriculture (Miscellaneous War Provisions) (No. 2) Act 1940	In section one, subsection (2).
10 & 11 Geo. 6 c. 48	Agriculture Act 1947	Part III except section thirty-two in relation to notices to quit given before the commencement of this Act and except section forty-six so far as relating to the provisions therein mentioned so far as continued in force by this Act. In section eighty-seven, subsection (10). In the Second Schedule, in paragraph 2 the words from “or a direction” to “permanent pasture” in the first place where those words occur, and in paragraph 4 the words from the beginning to “this Act”. The Third, Fourth, Fifth, Sixth and Seventh Schedules.

== Subsequent developments ==
The whole act was repealed by section 101(1) of, and part I of schedule 15 to, the Agricultural Holdings Act 1986.
