= Master of the Harriers =

Position in the British Royal Household

The master of the harriers was a position in the British Royal Household, responsible for overseeing the Royal harriers. It was allowed to lapse in 1701, but was revived in 1730 as the "master of the harriers and foxhounds". The position was abolished in a reorganization of the Royal Household in 1782.

== Masters of the Harriers (from 1660) ==
- 1660: Thomas Elliott (senior)
- 1677: Thomas Elliott (junior)
- 1683: William Ryder
- 1689: Christopher Tancred
- 1701 Vacant
- 1730: Charles Howard, 3rd Earl of Carlisle
- 1738: Robert Walpole, 1st Baron Walpole
- 1751: Vacant
- 1754: Lord Robert Manners-Sutton
- 1756: Vacant
- 1761: Basil Feilding, 6th Earl of Denbigh
