= War Memorials (Local Authorities' Powers) Act 1923 =

Act of the Parliament of the United Kingdom

War Memorials (Local Authorities' Powers) Act 1923 (Note: Section 5.)
- Act of Parliament
- Parliament of the United Kingdom
- Long title: An Act to enable local authorities under certain circumstances to maintain, repair and protect war memorials vested in them.
- Citation: 13 & 14 Geo. 5. c. 18
- Territorial extent: United Kingdom

Dates
- Royal assent: 18 July 1923
- Commencement: 18 July 1923 (Note: The Acts of Parliament (Commencement) Act 1793.)
Other legislation
| Amended by | Local Government Act 1948; Local Government Act 1972; Statute Law (Repeals) Act 1976 |

Status: Amended

Text of statute as originally enacted

Revised text of statute as amended

Text of the War Memorials (Local Authorities' Powers) Act 1923 as in force today (including any amendments) within the United Kingdom, from legislation.gov.uk.

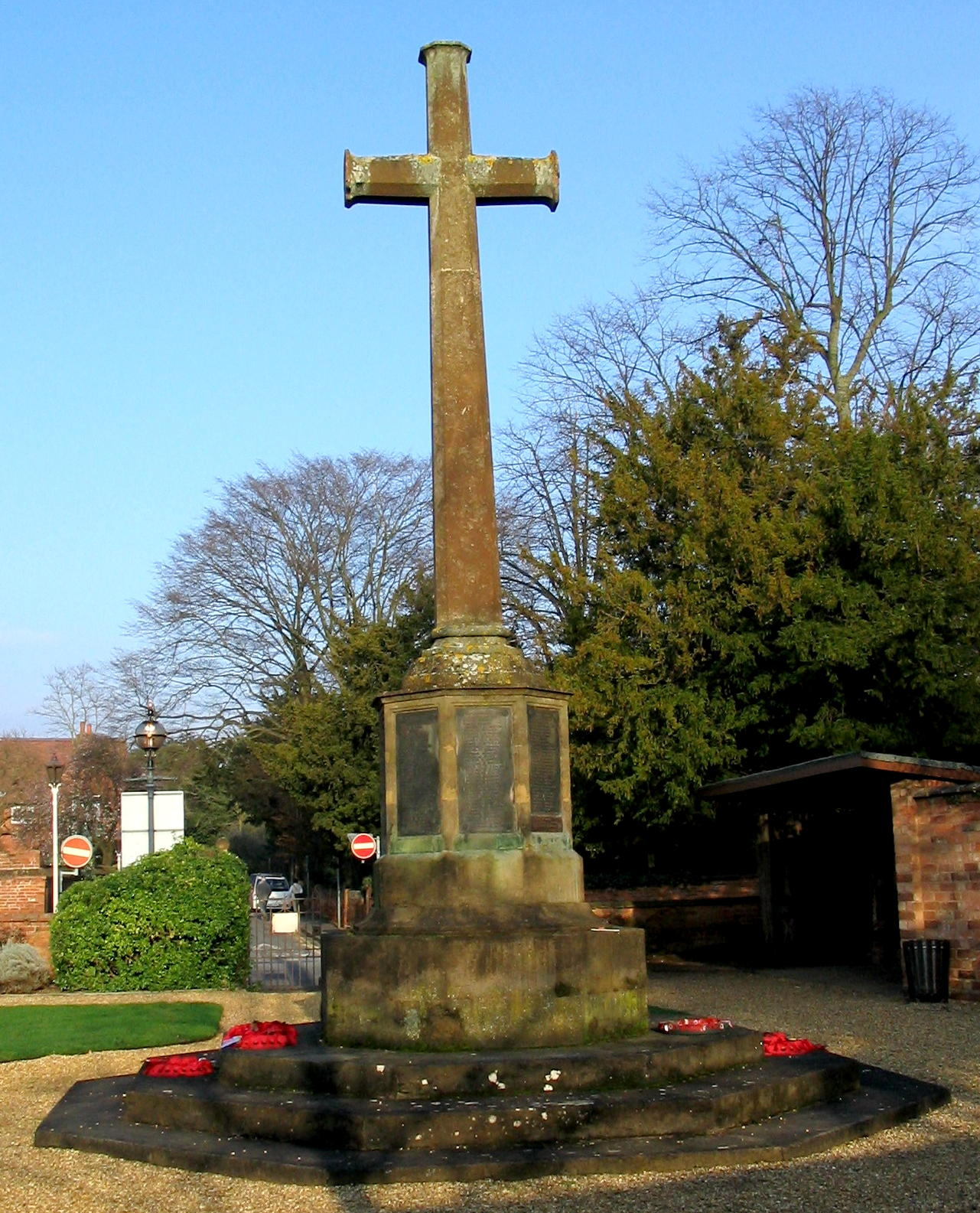
A town war memorial, in Stratford-upon-Avon.

The War Memorials (Local Authorities' Powers) Act 1923 (13 & 14 Geo. 5. c. 18) is an act of the Parliament of the United Kingdom. It received royal assent on 18 July 1923.

It extended throughout the United Kingdom, and empowered county, borough, district and parish councils ("local authorities") to incur expenditure on constructing and maintaining a war memorial within the area for which they were responsible. Expenditure was to be covered by levying a rate which was not to exceed 1⅓ of a penny in the pound for any given financial year (0.5%); parish councils were required to have this rate approved by the county council.

The act has been modernised in line with administrative reorganisations, but is still in force.
