= Whixley =

Village and civil parish in North Yorkshire, England

Coordinates: 54°00′54″N 1°19′25″W

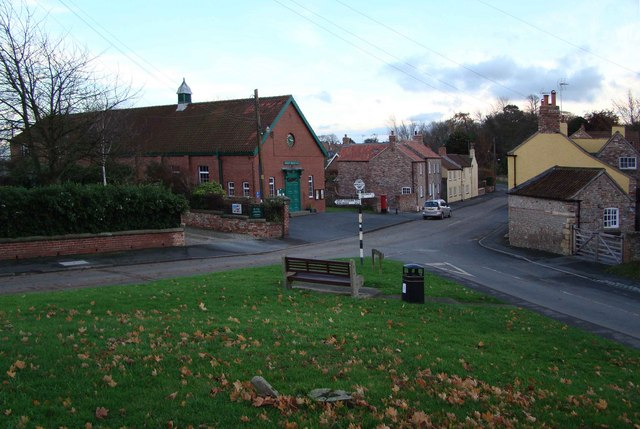
- Whixley Village Hall

- Location within North Yorkshire
- Population: 824 (2011 Census)
- OS grid reference: SE443580
- Unitary authority: North Yorkshire
- Ceremonial county: North Yorkshire
- Region: Yorkshire and the Humber
- Country: England
- Sovereign state: United Kingdom
- Post town: YORK
- Postcode district: YO26
- Police: North Yorkshire
- Fire: North Yorkshire
- Ambulance: Yorkshire

Whixley is a village and civil parish in the county of North Yorkshire, England. It is near the A1(M) motorway and 10 miles (16 km) west of York. The ancient village of Whixley lies on Rudgate, the old Roman road along which the Roman “Hispania” Legion would have marched to nearby Isurium (Aldborough).

Until 1974 it was part of the West Riding of Yorkshire. From 1974 to 2023 it was part of the Borough of Harrogate, it is now administered by the unitary North Yorkshire Council.

== History ==
The name Whixley derives from the Old English Cwicslēah meaning 'Cwic's wood/clearing'.

To the Normans it was Cucheslaga (recorded as Cucheslage in the Domesday Book) but by the 14th century it was called Quixley after the Lord of the Manor.

For many years Whixley was famous for cherries which were originally cultivated by the friars from the Priory of Knaresborough, and in later times were sold in London at Covent Garden. A great day of celebration was the annual Whixley Cherry Feast held on the first Sunday in August, The word Feast meant “festival” rather than the scoffing of huge amounts of the fruit.

Many of the houses in Whixley are a reminder of these times with Cherry House, Cherry Cottage, Cherry Tree Farm and many others.

In the 17th century the Tancred family replaced the Quixleys and became Lords of the Manor, living at Whixley Hall. The last of the line was Christopher Tancred, who died in 1754, whose portrait hangs in Christ's College, Cambridge. A stone plaque on the Park Wall commemorates Christopher first having a paling fence around the Park in 1710 and the Park wall being finished in 1744, the Park to be forever stocked with 40 deer. Christopher was quite a character and there are many stories about him. His sarcophagus can be seen in the Church of the Ascension.

The Tancred estate was bought by the West Riding County Council in 1920 and, amid much controversy, four good farms were split up into 50 acre smallholdings to provide a living for men returning from military service in the First World War. The living of the four evicted farmers does not seem to have been given much consideration.

Today, under North Yorkshire County Council, most of these small farm houses have been sold and the land is being absorbed into larger land-ownerships, as it was 100 years ago.

In 1905 a hospital was opened on the hill-top south of Whixley. It was known as the Inebriates Reformatory but it seems to have rapidly become a dumping ground for orphans, waifs and strays for whom society could find no other place and eventually it became a mental hospital. Apart from being displaced, many of the “patients” had little wrong with them and were allowed out to help on farms at harvest time. They were known locally as the “Nibs”, short for Inebriates. Many of them lie in unmarked and forgotten graves in the churchyard. The hospital closed in 1993 and the site now forms the attractive residential development of Whixley Gate.

The Church of the Ascension has looked over Whixley for over 1,000 years. Recorded in the Domesday Book of 1086, the Church was burned and destroyed by marauding “Reivers” from the Scottish borders in the 13th and 14th centuries. The present church was rebuilt in the 14th century and is grade II* listed. Only the font and one window remain of the earlier Norman church building. See 'External Links' below for a survey of burials in the churchyard.

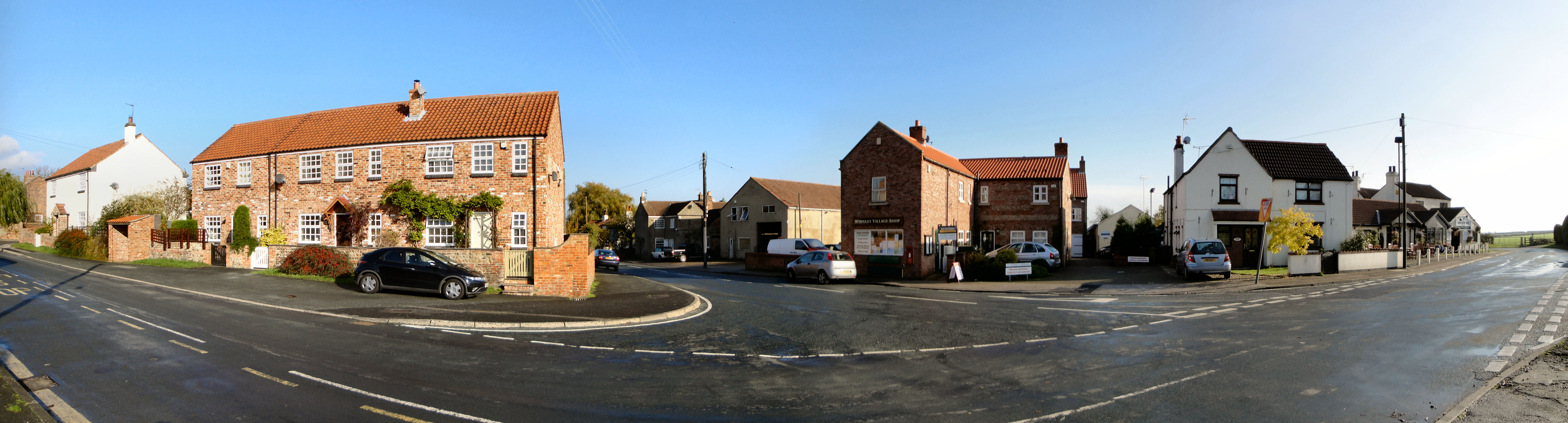
Panoramic shot of High Street, Village Shop and Anchor Inn

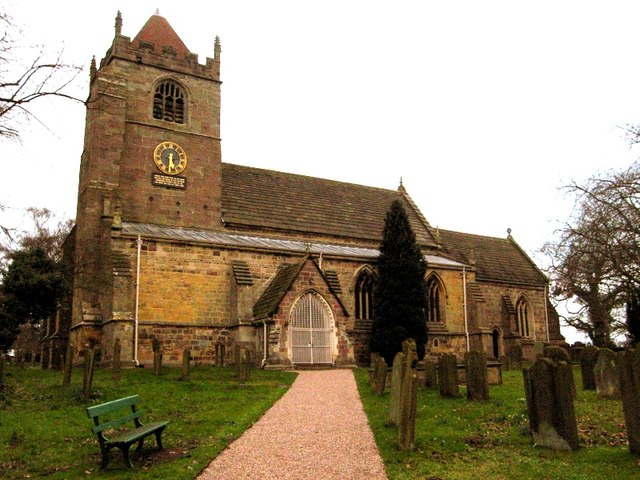
Whixley's Parish Church of the Ascension

== Transport ==
Whixley is about a 30 minute walk from Cattal train station where trains operate to York, Knaresborough, Harrogate and Leeds with onward connections provided at York and Leeds. Trains are every 30 minutes each way.

The village is served by the 22 and 23 bus routes to York, Boroughbridge and Ripon approximately every 2 hours. The 23 bus only operates the first and last services of the day. The bus continues from Ripon to Knaresborough but it is recommended to take the train from Whixley to Knaresborough or connect at Boroughbridge due to the long travel time.

Whixley is close to the B6265 to Boroughbridge and Ripon and the A59 to York, Knaresborough, Harrogate and Skipton. The A59 has a nearby junction with the A1M which is a gateway to many major UK cities.

== See also ==
- Listed buildings in Whixley
