= List of statutory instruments of the United Kingdom, 1978 =

This is an incomplete list of statutory instruments of the United Kingdom in 1978.

== Statutory instruments ==
=== 1-499 ===
==== 1–99 ====
- Diseases of Animals (Approved Disinfectants) Order 1978 (SI 1978/32)
- Merchant Shipping (Provisions and Water) Regulations 1978 (SI 1978/36)
- District of South Kesteven (Electoral Arrangements) Order 1978 (SI 1978/43)
- District of Selby (Electoral Arrangements) Order 1978 (SI 1978/45)
- District of Mid Suffolk (Electoral Arrangements) Order 1978 (SI 1978/46)
- District of Teignbridge (Electoral Arrangements) Order 1978 (SI 1978/47)
- District of Wychavon (Electoral Arrangements) Order 1978 (SI 1978/49)
- Tayside Region (Electoral Arrangements) Order 1978 (SI 1978/58)
- Highland Region (Electoral Arrangements) Order 1978 (SI 1978/59)
- London Borough of Tower Hamlets (Electoral Arrangements) Order 1978 (SI 1978/63)
- District of Basildon (Electoral Arrangements) Order 1978 (SI 1978/87)
- City of Chester (Electoral Arrangements) Order 1978 (SI 1978/88)
- London Borough of Harrow (Electoral Arrangements) Order 1978 (SI 1978/89)
- District of Vale of White Horse (Electoral Arrangements) Order 1978 (SI 1978/90)

==== 100–199 ====
- Merchant Shipping (Seamen's Documents) (Amendment) Regulations 1978 (SI 1978/107)
- New Forest and Southampton (Areas) Order 1978 (SI 1978/129)
- State Scheme Premiums (Actuarial Tables) Regulations 1978 (SI 1978/134)

==== 200–299 ====
- Patents Rules 1978 (SI 1978/216)
- The District of Derwentside (Electoral Arrangements) Order 1978 (SI 1978/231)
- Local Government Area Changes (Amendment) Regulations 1978 (SI 1978/247)
- Agricultural Holdings (Arbitration on Notices) Order 1978 (SI 1978/257)
- Transfer of Functions (Wales) (No. 1) Order 1978 (SI 1978/272)
- Plant Breeders' Rights Regulations 1978 (SI 1978/294)

==== 300–399 ====
- Home Loss Payments (Scotland) Order 1978 (SI 1978/323)
- Police Pensions (Amendment) Regulations 1978 (SI 1978/375)
- Social Security (Graduated Retirement Benefit) (No. 2) Regulations 1978 (SI 1978/393)

==== 400–499 ====
- National Insurance Commissioners (Pensions) (Preservation of Benefits) Order 1978 (SI 1978/407)
- National Insurance Commissioners' Pensions (Requisite Benefits) Order 1978 (SI 1978/408)
- The Lothian Region (Electoral Arrangements) Order 1978 (SI 1978/418)
- The Borough of Hastings (Electoral Arrangements) Order 1978 (SI 1978/437)
- Industrial Training (Transfer of the Activities of Establishments) Order 1978 (SI 1978/448)
- Property (Northern Ireland) Order 1978 (SI 1978/459) (N.I. 4)
- Sexual Offences (Northern Ireland) Order 1978 (SI 1978/460) (N.I. 5)
- Loughborough and Birstall Light Railway Order 1978 (SI 1978/471)
- The District of South Holland (Electoral Arrangements) Order 1978 (SI 1978/482)

== 501–600 ==
- Rules of the Supreme Court (Amendment No. 3) 1978 (SI 1978/579)

== 601–700 ==
- The Borough of Sandwell (Electoral Arrangements) Order 1978 (SI 1978/610)
- Offshore Installations (Fire-fighting Equipment) Regulations 1978 (SI 1978/611)
- Legal Aid (Scotland) (General) Amendment Regulations 1978 (SI 1978/622)
- Torts (Interference with Goods) Act 1977 (Commencement No. 2) Order 1978 (SI 1978/627)

== 701–800 ==
- Price Marking (Food) Order 1978 (SI 1978/738)
- County Court Funds (Amendment) Rules 1978 (SI 1978/750)
- The Borough of Hove (Electoral Arrangements) Order 1978 (SI 1978/753)
- Merchant Shipping (Crew Accommodation) Regulations 1978 (SI 1978/795)

== 801–900 ==
- Administration of Justice Act 1977 (Commencement No. 5) Order 1978 (SI 1978/810)
- Babies' Dummies (Safety) Regulations 1978 (SI 1978/836)
- Cambridge Water Order 1978 (SI 1978/881)
- The Grampian Region (Electoral Arrangements) Order 1978 (SI 1978/882)
- Authorised Officers (Meat Inspection) Regulations 1978 (SI 1978/884)

== 901–1000 ==
- Merchant Shipping (Seamen's Documents) (Amendment No. 2) Regulations 1978 (SI 1978/979)
- Cambridge Water (No. 2) Order 1978 (SI 1978/986)
- The District of West Lindsey (Electoral Arrangements) Order 1978 (SI 1978/990)

== 1001–1100 ==
- Health and Safety at Work (Northern Ireland) Order 1978 S.I. 1978/1039 (N.I. 9)
- Financial Provisions (Northern Ireland) Order 1978 S.I. 1978/1041 (N.I. 11)
- Matrimonial Causes (Northern Ireland) Order 1978 S.I. 1978/1045 (N.I. 15)
- Payments for Debt (Amendment) (Northern Ireland) Order 1978 S.I. 1978/1046 (N.I. 16)
- Protection of Children (Northern Ireland) Order 1978 S.I. 1978/1047 (N.I. 17)
- Planning (Amendment) (Northern Ireland) Order 1978 S.I. 1978/1048 (N.I. 18)
- Pollution Control and Local Government (Northern Ireland) Order 1978 S.I. 1978/1049 (N.I. 19)
- Rent (Northern Ireland) Order 1978 S.I. 1978/1050 (N.I. 20)

== 1101–1200 ==
- Criminal Appeal (Amendment) Rules 1978 (SI 1978/1118)
- Isle of Wight (Havenstreet and Wootton) Light Railway Order 1978 (SI 1978/1119)
- Mobility Allowance (Motability Payments Arrangements) Regulations 1978 (SI 1978/1131)

== 1201–1300 ==
- Pensions Increase (Annual Review) Order 1978 (SI 1978/1211)
- Industrial Training (Transfer of the Activities of Establishments) (No. 2) Order 1978 (SI 1978/1225)
- District of Allerdale (Electoral Arrangements) Order 1978 (SI 1978/1246)
- Borough of St. Edmundsbury (Electoral Arrangements) Order 1978 (SI 1978/1247)
- Slaughterhouse Hygiene (Scotland) Regulations 1978 (SI 1978/1273)
- Borough of Erewash (Electoral Arrangements) Order 1978 (SI 1978/1299)
- Borough of Warrington (Electoral Arrangements) Order 1978 (SI 1978/1300)

== 1301–1400 ==
- Trade Unions and Employers' Associations (Amalgamations, etc.) (Amendment) Regulations 1978 (SI 1978/1344)
- Police Pensions (Amendment) (No. 2) Regulations 1978 (SI 1978/1348)
- The District of Kerrier (Electoral Arrangements) Order 1978 (SI 1978/1356)
- National Insurance Commissioners' Pensions (Requisite Benefits) (Amendment) Order 1978 (SI 1978/1368)
- The District of Carrick (Electoral Arrangements) Order 1978 (SI 1978/1370)

== 1401–1500 ==
- Theft (Northern Ireland) Order 1978 S.I. 1978/1407 (N.I. 23)
- The District of Adur (Electoral Arrangements) Order 1978 S.I. 1978/1434
- The District of Cotswold (Electoral Arrangements) Order 1978 S.I. 1978/1435
- The Borough of Ipswich (Electoral Arrangements) Order 1978 S.I. 1978/1436
- The Borough of Macclesfield (Electoral Arrangements) Order 1978 S.I. 1978/1437
- The District of North Norfolk (Electoral Arrangements) Order 1978 S.I. 1978/1438
- The District of Thanet (Electoral Arrangements) Order 1978 S.I. 1978/1439
- The Borough of Copeland (Electoral Arrangements) Order 1978 S.I. 1978/1465
- The District of Cherwell (Electoral Arrangements) Order 1978 S.I. 1978/1473
- The District of Bolsover (Electoral Arrangements) Order 1978 S.I. 1978/1494
- The District of Wyre Forest (Electoral Arrangements) Order 1978 S.I. 1978/1495

== 1501–1600 ==
- The District of Penwith (Electoral Arrangements) Order 1978 S.I. 1978/1505
- Naval, Military and Air Forces Etc. (Disablement and Death) Service Pensions Order 1978 S.I. 1978/1525
- The Borough of Chesterfield (Electoral Arrangements) Order 1978 S.I. 1978/1552
- The Borough of Gosport (Electoral Arrangements) Order 1978 S.I. 1978/1553
- Legal Advice and Assistance (Scotland) Amendment Regulations 1978 S.I. 1978/1565
- Police Pensions (Amendment) (No. 3) Regulations 1978 S.I. 1978/1578
- The District of The Wrekin (Electoral Arrangements) Order 1978 S.I. 1978/1591

== 1601–1700 ==
- The Borough of Grimsby (Electoral Arrangements) Order 1978 S.I. 1978/1604
- The Borough of Oldham (Electoral Arrangements) Order 1978 S.I. 1978/1605
- The Borough of Solihull (Electoral Arrangements) Order 1978 S.I. 1978/1606
- The District of Amber Valley (Electoral Arrangements) Order 1978 S.I. 1978/1611
- The District of Breckland (Electoral Arrangements) Order 1978 S.I. 1978/1612
- The City of Derby (Electoral Arrangements) Order 1978 S.I. 1978/1613
- The Borough of Barnsley (Electoral Arrangements) Order 1978 S.I. 1978/1639
- The District of Wokingham (Electoral Arrangements) Order 1978 S.I. 1978/1640
- The Stewartry District (Electoral Arrangements) Order 1978 S.I. 1978/1641
- The Wigtown District (Electoral Arrangements) Order 1978 S.I. 1978/1642
- Industrial Training (Transfer of the Activities of Establishments) (No. 3) Order 1978 S.I. 1978/1643
- The Borough of Northampton (Electoral Arrangements) Order 1978 S.I. 1978/1664
- The District of South Lakeland (Electoral Arrangements) Order 1978 S.I. 1978/1665
- The City of Durham (Electoral Arrangements) Order 1978 S.I. 1978/1690
- The Borough of Weymouth and Portland (Electoral Arrangements) Order 1978 S.I. 1978/1694
- Social Security Benefit (Computation of Earnings) Regulations 1978 S.I. 1978/1698

== 1701–1800 ==
- The Borough of Bury (Electoral Arrangements) Order 1978 S.I. 1978/1722
- Compressed Acetylene (Importation) Regulations 1978 S.I. 1978/1723
- Fire Services (Appointments and Promotion) (Scotland) Regulations 1978 S.I. 1978/1727
- The District of Dover (Electoral Arrangements) Order 1978 S.I. 1978/1749
- The City of Lincoln (Electoral Arrangements) Order 1978 S.I. 1978/1750
- The District of Torridge (Electoral Arrangements) Order 1978 S.I. 1978/1751
- Merchant Shipping (Seamen's Documents) (Amendment No. 3) Regulations 1978 S.I. 1978/1758
- The District of North East Derbyshire (Electoral Arrangements) Order 1978 S.I. 1978/1768
- The City of St. Albans (Electoral Arrangements) Order 1978 S.I. 1978/1783
- The Borough of Newcastle-under-Lyme (Electoral Arrangements) Order 1978 S.I. 1978/1792
- The City of Plymouth (Electoral Arrangements) Order 1978 S.I. 1978/1793

== 1801–1900 ==
- The District of North Cornwall (Electoral Arrangements) Order 1978 S.I. 1978/1806
- The Borough of Bournemouth (Electoral Arrangements) Order 1978 S.I. 1978/1813
- The District of Hambleton (Electoral Arrangements) Order 1978 S.I. 1978/1814
- The District of Shepway (Electoral Arrangements) Order 1978 S.I. 1978/1814 ??
- The Borough of Christchurch (Electoral Arrangements) Order 1978 S.I. 1978/1841
- The District of East Devon (Electoral Arrangements) Order 1978 S.I. 1978/1842
- The District of Leominster (Electoral Arrangements) Order 1978 S.I. 1978/1843
- The District of Easington (Electoral Arrangements) Order 1978 S.I. 1978/1859
- The District of Forest Heath (Electoral Arrangements) Order 1978 S.I. 1978/1860
- The District of Horsham (Electoral Arrangements) Order 1978 S.I. 1978/1861
- The Borough of Rugby (Electoral Arrangements) Order 1978 S.I. 1978/1862
- The Borough of Sefton (Electoral Arrangements) Order 1978 S.I. 1978/1863

== 1901–2000 ==
- Health and Personal Social Services (Northern Ireland) Order 1978 (SI 1978/1907) (N.I. 26)
- Rehabilitation of Offenders (Northern Ireland) Order 1978 (SI 1978/1908) (N.I. 27)
- European Communities (Services of Lawyers) Order 1978 (SI 1978/1910)
- Cranmore Light Railway Order 1978 (SI 1978/1937)
- City of Westminster (Electoral Arrangements) Order 1978 (SI 1978/1978)

== See also ==
- List of statutory instruments of the United Kingdom
