= List of acts of the Parliament of the United Kingdom from 1921 =

This is a complete list of acts of the Parliament of the United Kingdom for the year 1921.

Note that the first parliament of the United Kingdom was held in 1801; parliaments between 1707 and 1800 were either parliaments of Great Britain or of Ireland). For acts passed up until 1707, see the list of acts of the Parliament of England and the list of acts of the Parliament of Scotland. For acts passed from 1707 to 1800, see the list of acts of the Parliament of Great Britain. See also the list of acts of the Parliament of Ireland.

For acts of the devolved parliaments and assemblies in the United Kingdom, see the list of acts of the Scottish Parliament, the list of acts of the Northern Ireland Assembly, and the list of acts and measures of Senedd Cymru; see also the list of acts of the Parliament of Northern Ireland.

The number shown after each act's title is its chapter number. Acts passed before 1963 are cited using this number, preceded by the year(s) of the reign during which the relevant parliamentary session was held; thus the Union with Ireland Act 1800 is cited as "39 & 40 Geo. 3 c. 67", meaning the 67th act passed during the session that started in the 39th year of the reign of George III and which finished in the 40th year of that reign. Note that the modern convention is to use Arabic numerals in citations (thus "41 Geo. 3" rather than "41 Geo. III"). Acts of the last session of the Parliament of Great Britain and the first session of the Parliament of the United Kingdom are both cited as "41 Geo. 3". Acts passed from 1963 onwards are simply cited by calendar year and chapter number.

== 11 & 12 Geo. 5 ==
The third session of the 31st Parliament of the United Kingdom, which met from 15 February 1921 until 10 November 1921.

The fourth session, which met from 14 December 1921 until 19 December 1921, did not pass any acts (it met solely to consider the Anglo-Irish Treaty).

This session was traditionally cited as 11 & 12 G. 5.

=== Public general acts ===
| Short title | Citation | Royal assent |
Long title
| Unemployment Insurance Act 1921 (repealed) | 11 & 12 Geo. 5. c. 1 | 3 March 1921 |
An Act to provide for an increase of the rates and period of benefit under the Unemployment Insurance Act, 1920, (Note: Unemployment Insurance Act 1920 (10 & 11 Geo. 5. c. 30)) and to vary the conditions for the receipt of such benefit, and to amend the said Act with respect to the rates and crediting of contributions thereunder, and otherwise. (Repealed for England and Wales and Scotland by Unemployment Insurance Act 1935 (25 & 26 Geo. 5. c. 8) and for Northern Ireland by Unemployment Insurance Act (Northern Ireland) 1936 (26 Geo. 5 & 1 Edw. 8. c. 30 (N.I.)))
| Consolidated Fund (No. 1) Act 1921 (repealed) | 11 & 12 Geo. 5. c. 2 | 8 March 1921 |
An Act to apply a sum out of the Consolidated Fund to the service of the year ending on the thirty-first day of March on thousand nine hundred and twenty-one. (Repealed by Statute Law Revision Act 1950 (14 Geo. 6. c. 6))
| Consolidated Fund (No. 2) Act 1921 (repealed) | 11 & 12 Geo. 5. c. 3 | 24 March 1921 |
An Act to apply certain sums out of the Consolidated Fund to the service of the years ending on the thirty-first day of March, one thousand nine hundred and twenty, one thousand nine hundred and twenty-one, and one thousand nine hundred and twenty-two. (Repealed by Statute Law Revision Act 1950 (14 Geo. 6. c. 6))
| Children Act 1921 (repealed) | 11 & 12 Geo. 5. c. 4 | 24 March 1921 |
An Act to amend the Children Act, 1908, (Note: Children Act 1908 (8 Edw. 7. c. 67)) in respect of the Expenses of Reformatory and Industrial Schools. (Repealed by Children and Young Persons Act 1932 (22 & 23 Geo. 5. c. 46) and Children and Young Persons (Scotland) Act 1932 (22 & 23 Geo. 5. c. 47))
| German Reparation (Recovery) Act 1921 (repealed) | 11 & 12 Geo. 5. c. 5 | 24 March 1921 |
An Act to provide for the application of part of the purchase price of imported German goods towards the discharge of the obligations of Germany under the Treaty of Versailles. (Repealed by Statute Law Revision Act 1953 (2 & 3 Eliz. 2. c. 5))
| Coal Mines (Decontrol) Act 1921 (repealed) | 11 & 12 Geo. 5. c. 6 | 24 March 1921 |
An Act to curtail the duration of and amend the Coal Mines (Emergency) Act, 1920, (Note: Coal Mines (Emergency) Act 1920 (10 & 11 Geo. 5. c. 4)) and for purposes connected therewith. (Repealed by Statute Law Revision Act 1953 (2 & 3 Eliz. 2. c. 5))
| Tribunals of Inquiry (Evidence) Act 1921 (repealed) | 11 & 12 Geo. 5. c. 7 | 24 March 1921 |
An Act to make provision with respect to the taking of evidence before and the procedure and powers of certain Tribunals of Inquiry. (Repealed by Inquiries Act 2005 (c. 12))
| Ministries of Munitions and Shipping (Cessation) Act 1921 (repealed) | 11 & 12 Geo. 5. c. 8 | 24 March 1921 |
An Act to make provision for the cessation of the Ministry of Munitions and the Ministry of Shipping. (Repealed by Statute Law Revision Act 1950 (14 Geo. 6. c. 6))
| Army and Air Force (Annual) Act 1921 (repealed) | 11 & 12 Geo. 5. c. 9 | 28 April 1921 |
An Act to provide, during Twelve Months, for the Discipline and Regulation of the Army and Air Force. (Repealed by Statute Law Revision Act 1927 (17 & 18 Geo. 5. c. 42), Statute Law Revision Act 1950 (14 Geo. 6. c. 6), Statute Law Revision Act 1953 (2 & 3 Eliz. 2. c. 5) and Revision of the Army and Air Force Acts (Transitional Provisions) Act 1955 (3 & 4 Eliz. 2. c. 20))
| Mr. Speaker's Retirement Act 1921 (repealed) | 11 & 12 Geo. 5. c. 10 | 12 May 1921 |
An Act to settle and secure an Annuity upon the Right honourable James William Lowther in consideration of his eminent Services. (Repealed by Statute Law Revision Act 1950 (14 Geo. 6. c. 6))
| Treaty of Peace (Hungary) Act 1921 (repealed) | 11 & 12 Geo. 5. c. 11 | 12 May 1921 |
An Act to carry into effect a Treaty of Peace between His Majesty and certain other Powers. (Repealed by Statute Law Revision Act 1966 (c. 5))
| Public Health (Tuberculosis) Act 1921 (repealed) | 11 & 12 Geo. 5. c. 12 | 12 May 1921 |
An Act to make further provision with respect to arrangements by local authorities for the treatment of tuberculosis. (Repealed by National Health Service Act 1946 (9 & 10 Geo. 6. c. 81))
| Captive Birds Shooting (Prohibition) Act 1921 (repealed) | 11 & 12 Geo. 5. c. 13 | 1 July 1921 |
An Act to prohibit the use of Captive Birds in all Shooting carried on under artificial conditions. (Repealed by Protection of Birds Act 1954 (2 & 3 Eliz. 2. c. 30))
| Protection of Animals Act (1911) Amendment Act 1921 (repealed) | 11 & 12 Geo. 5. c. 14 | 1 July 1921 |
An Act to amend the Protection of Animals Act, 1911. (Note: Protection of Animals Act 1911 (1 & 2 Geo. 5. c. 27)) (Repealed by Animal Welfare Act 2006 (c. 45))
| Unemployment Insurance (No. 2) Act 1921 (repealed) | 11 & 12 Geo. 5. c. 15 | 1 July 1921 |
An Act to vary the rates of contribution and the rates and periods of benefit under the Unemployment Insurance Acts, 1920 and 1921, (Note: Unemployment Insurance Act 1921 (11 & 12 Geo. 5. c. 1)) and otherwise to amend those Acts. (Repealed for England and Wales and Scotland by Unemployment Insurance Act 1935 (25 & 26 Geo. 5. c. 8) and for Northern Ireland by Unemployment Insurance Act (Northern Ireland) 1936 (26 Geo. 5 & 1 Edw. 8. c. 30 (N.I.)))
| Importation of Plumage (Prohibition) Act 1921 or the Plumage Act 1908 (repealed) | 11 & 12 Geo. 5. c. 16 | 1 July 1921 |
An Act to prohibit the importation of Plumage. (Repealed by Endangered Species (Import and Export) Act 1976 (c. 72))
| Agriculture (Amendment) Act 1921 (repealed) | 11 & 12 Geo. 5. c. 17 | 1 July 1921 |
An Act to explain proviso (4) to section twelve of the Agriculture Act, 1920, (Note: Agriculture Act 1920 (10 & 11 Geo. 5. c. 76)) and the First Schedule to that Act so far as that Schedule amends subsection (1) of section one of the Agricultural Holdings Act, 1908, (Note: Agricultural Holdings Act 1908 (8 Edw. 7. c. 28)) and the Agricultural Holdings (Scotland) Act, 1908, (Note: Agricultural Holdings (Scotland) Act 1908 (8 Edw. 7. c. 64)) and to remove doubt as to the procedure in arbitrations as to rent under section ten of the Agriculture Act, 1920. (Repealed by Agricultural Holdings Act 1923 (13 & 14 Geo. 5. c. 9) and Agricultural Holdings (Scotland) Act 1923 (13 & 14 Geo. 5. c. 10))
| Indian Divorces (Validity) Act 1921 (repealed) | 11 & 12 Geo. 5. c. 18 | 1 July 1921 |
An Act to make provision with respect to the validity of certain decrees granted in India for the dissolution of the marriage of persons domiciled in the United Kingdom. (Repealed by Statute Law (Repeals) Act 1975 (c. 10))
| Housing Act 1921 | 11 & 12 Geo. 5. c. 19 | 1 July 1921 |
An Act to amend the law relating to the Housing of the People, and for purposes in connection therewith. (Repealed for England and Wales by Housing, &c. Act 1923 (13 & 14 Geo. 5. c. 24), Housing Act 1925 (15 & 16 Geo. 5. c. 14), Town Planning Act 1925 (15 & 16 Geo. 5. c. 16), Housing Act 1935 (25 & 26 Geo. 5. c. 40) and Statute Law Revision Act 1950 (14 Geo. 6. c. 6))
| Tithe Annuities Apportionment Act 1921 (repealed) | 11 & 12 Geo. 5. c. 20 | 28 July 1921 |
An Act to provide for the apportionment of annuities created by the redemption of tithe rentcharge. (Repealed by Statute Law (Repeals) Act 2004 (c. 14))
| Dentists Act 1921 (repealed) | 11 & 12 Geo. 5. c. 21 | 28 July 1921 |
An Act to amend the Dentists Act, 1878, and the provisions of the Medical Act, 1886, (Note: Medical Act 1886 (49 & 50 Vict. c. 48)) amending that Act. (Repealed by Dentists Act 1957 (5 & 6 Eliz. 2. c. 28))
| Protection of Animals (Scotland) Act 1912 Amendment Act 1921 (repealed) | 11 & 12 Geo. 5. c. 22 | 28 July 1921 |
An Act to amend the Protection of Animals (Scotland) Act, 1912. (Note: Protection of Animals (Scotland) Act 1912 (2 & 3 Geo. 5. c. 14)) (Repealed by Animal Health and Welfare (Scotland) Act 2006 (asp 11))
| Public Health (Officers) Act 1921 (repealed) | 11 & 12 Geo. 5. c. 23 | 28 July 1921 |
An Act to amend the Law relating to the Appointment and Tenure of Office of Medical Officers of Health, Sanitary Inspectors, and Inspectors of Nuisances, and for other purposes. (Repealed by Public Health Act 1936 (26 Geo. 5 & 1 Edw. 8. c. 49) and Public Health (London) Act 1936 (26 Geo. 5 & 1 Edw. 8. c. 50))
| Deceased Brother's Widow's Marriage Act 1921 (repealed) | 11 & 12 Geo. 5. c. 24 | 28 July 1921 |
An Act to amend the Law relating to marriage with a deceased brother's widow. (Repealed for England and Wales by Marriage Act 1949 (12, 13 & 14 Geo. 6. c. 76), for Scotland by Marriage (Enabling) Act 1960 (8 & 9 Eliz. 2. c. 29) and for Northern Ireland by Family Law (Miscellaneous Provisions) (Northern Ireland) Order 1984 (SI 1984/1984 (N.I. 14)))
| National Health Insurance Act 1921 (repealed) | 11 & 12 Geo. 5. c. 25 | 28 July 1921 |
An Act to amend the financial provisions of the National Health Insurance Acts, 1911 to 1920, and to provide for increasing the amounts payable to insurance committees on account of their administration expenses, and for reducing the number of members of insurance committees. (Repealed by National Health Insurance Act 1924 (14 & 15 Geo. 5. c. 38))
| Overseas Trade (Credits and Insurance) Amendment Act 1921 (repealed) | 11 & 12 Geo. 5. c. 26 | 28 July 1921 |
An Act to extend the Overseas Trade (Credits and Insurance) Act, 1920, (Note: Overseas Trade (Credits and Insurance) Act 1920 (10 & 11 Geo. 5. c. 29)) to the giving of guarantees in connection with export transactions, and otherwise to amend section one of that Act. (Repealed by Export Guarantees Act 1937 (1 Edw. 8 & 1 Geo. 6. c. 61))
| Health Resorts and Watering Places Act 1921 (repealed) | 11 & 12 Geo. 5. c. 27 | 28 July 1921 |
An Act to empower Local Authorities to advertise Health Resorts and Watering Places. (Repealed by Health Resorts and Watering Places Act 1936 (26 Geo. 5 & 1 Edw. 8. c. 48))
| Merchant Shipping Act 1921 | 11 & 12 Geo. 5. c. 28 | 28 July 1921 |
An Act to amend the Merchant Shipping Acts, 1894 to 1920.
| Church of Scotland Act 1921 | 11 & 12 Geo. 5. c. 29 | 28 July 1921 |
An Act to declare the lawfulness of certain Articles declaratory of the Constitution of the Church of Scotland in matters spiritual prepared with the authority of the General Assembly of the Church.
| Coroners Act 1921 (repealed) | 11 & 12 Geo. 5. c. 30 | 28 July 1921 |
An Act to amend the Law relating to the Remuneration of Coroners. (Repealed by Statute Law (Repeals) Act 1977 (c. 18))
| Police Pensions Act 1921 | 11 & 12 Geo. 5. c. 31 | 28 July 1921 |
An Act to consolidate and amend the law respecting the Retirement, Pensions, Allowances, and Gratuities of Members of Police Forces in Great Britain, and their Widows, Children, and Dependants.
| Finance Act 1921 | 11 & 12 Geo. 5. c. 32 | 4 August 1921 |
An Act to grant certain Duties of Customs and Inland Revenue (including Excise), to alter other Duties, and to amend the Law relating to Customs and Inland Revenue (including Excise), and the National Debt, and to make further provision in connection with Finance.
| Housing (Scotland) Act 1921 (repealed) | 11 & 12 Geo. 5. c. 33 | 4 August 1921 |
An Act to make further provision for the extension of the time for the construction of houses in Scotland for the purpose of obtaining grants under section one of the Housing (Additional Powers) Act, 1919, (Note: Housing (Additional Powers) Act 1919 (9 & 10 Geo. 5. c. 99)) and to limit the aggregate amount of such grants in respect of houses in Scotland. (Repealed by Housing (Scotland) Act 1925 (15 & 16 Geo. 5. c. 15))
| Representation of the People Act 1921 (repealed) | 11 & 12 Geo. 5. c. 34 | 4 August 1921 |
Act to amend the Representation of the People Acts, 1918 to 1920, with respect to interruptions of residence during the qualifying period. (Repealed by Representation of the People Act 1948 (11 & 12 Geo. 6. c. 65))
| Corn Sales Act 1921 | 11 & 12 Geo. 5. c. 35 | 17 August 1921 |
An Act to provide for the greater uniformity in the Weights and Measures used in the Sale of Corn and other Crops, to amend the Corn Returns Act, 1882, and for purposes connected therewith.
| Juries (Emergency Provisions) (Renewal) Act 1921 (repealed) | 11 & 12 Geo. 5. c. 36 | 17 August 1921 |
An Act to renew section two of the Juries (Emergency Provisions) Act, 1920. (Note: Juries (Emergency Provisions) Act 1920 (10 & 11 Geo. 5. c. 78)) (Repealed by Statute Law Revision Act 1950 (14 Geo. 6. c. 6))
| Territorial Army and Militia Act 1921 (repealed) | 11 & 12 Geo. 5. c. 37 | 17 August 1921 |
An Act to provide for the application of new designations to the territorial force and the special reserve, and to repeal enactments relating to the militia and yeomanry; and for purposes in connection therewith. (Repealed by Reserve Forces Act 1980 (c. 9))
| Salmon and Freshwater Fisheries Act 1921 (repealed) | 11 & 12 Geo. 5. c. 38 | 17 August 1921 |
An Act to increase the maximum licence duties for fishing for salmon and freshwater fish. (Repealed for England and Wales and Scotland by Salmon and Freshwater Fisheries Act 1923 (13 & 14 Geo. 5. c. 16) and for Northern Ireland by Fisheries Act (Northern Ireland) 1949 (c. 22 (N.I.)))
| Admiralty Pensions Act 1921 | 11 & 12 Geo. 5. c. 39 | 17 August 1921 |
An Act to make further provision with respect to Admiralty Pensions, and with respect to Pensions, Grants, or Allowances payable under the Injuries in War (Compensation) Acts, and the Government War Obligations Acts.
| Isle of Man (Customs) Act 1921 (repealed) | 11 & 12 Geo. 5. c. 40 | 17 August 1921 |
An Act to amend the law with respect to Customs in the Isle of Man. (Repealed by Statute Law Revision Act 1950 (14 Geo. 6. c. 6))
| Greenwich Hospital Act 1921 (repealed) | 11 & 12 Geo. 5. c. 41 | 17 August 1921 |
An Act to amend the Greenwich Hospital Act, 1872. (Note: Greenwich Hospital Act 1872 (35 & 36 Vict. c. 67)) (Repealed by Statute Law Revision Act 1950 (14 Geo. 6. c. 6))
| Licensing Act 1921 (repealed) | 11 & 12 Geo. 5. c. 42 | 17 August 1921 |
An Act to amend the law relating to the sale and supply of intoxicating liquor, and for purposes in connection therewith. (Repealed for England and Wales by Licensing Act 1953 (1 & 2 Eliz. 2. c. 46) and for Scotland by Licensing (Scotland) Act 1959 (7 & 8 Eliz. 2. c. 51))
| Land Settlement Amendment Act 1921 (repealed) | 11 & 12 Geo. 5. c. 43 | 17 August 1921 |
An Act to amend section fourteen of the Land Settlement (Facilities) Act, 1919, (Note: Land Settlement (Facilities) Act 1919 (9 & 10 Geo. 5. c. 59)) and sections twenty-six and twenty-nine of the Land Settlement (Scotland) Act, 1919, (Note: Land Settlement (Scotland) Act 1919 (9 & 10 Geo. 5. c. 97)) by extending the periods of time therein respectively mentioned, and to raise the limit on the aggregate amount which may be issued out of the Consolidated Fund under the said section twenty-six for the purpose of advances to the Board of Agriculture for Scotland. (Repealed by Statute Law Revision Act 1950 (14 Geo. 6. c. 6))
| Water Undertakings (Modification of Charges) Act 1921 (repealed) | 11 & 12 Geo. 5. c. 44 | 17 August 1921 |
An Act to make provision for the modification of the charges which may be made in respect of water undertakings. (Repealed by Water Act 1945 (8 & 9 Geo. 6. c. 42))
| Duchy of Lancaster (Application of Capital Moneys) Act 1921 (repealed) | 11 & 12 Geo. 5. c. 45 | 17 August 1921 |
An Act to authorise capital moneys belonging to the Duchy of Lancaster to be applied, up to an amount not exceeding one hundred thousand pounds, as revenues of the Duchy. (Repealed by Statute Law Revision Act 1950 (14 Geo. 6. c. 6))
| Appropriation Act 1921 (repealed) | 11 & 12 Geo. 5. c. 46 | 19 August 1921 |
An Act to apply a sum out of the Consolidated Fund to the service of the year ending on the thirty-first day of March one thousand nine hundred and twenty-two, and to appropriate the Supplies granted in this Session of Parliament. (Repealed by Statute Law Revision Act 1950 (14 Geo. 6. c. 6))
| Safeguarding of Industries Act 1921 (repealed) | 11 & 12 Geo. 5. c. 47 | 19 August 1921 |
An Act to impose duties of customs on certain goods with a view to the safeguarding of certain special industries and the safeguarding of employment in industries in the United Kingdom against the effects of the depreciation of foreign currencies, and the disposal of imported goods at prices below the cost of production, and for purposes connected therewith. (Repealed by Import Duties Act 1958 (6 & 7 Eliz. 2. c. 6))
| Corn Production Acts (Repeal) Act 1921 (repealed) | 11 & 12 Geo. 5. c. 48 | 19 August 1921 |
An Act to repeal the Corn Production Acts, 1917 (Note: Corn Production Act 1917 (7 & 8 Geo. 5. c. 46)) and 1920, to make provision as to payments under those Acts in respect of the crops of the current year, to provide funds for agricultural development, to promote the formation of joint conciliation committees for the industry of agriculture, and to make certain consequential amendments in section twelve, and to repeal subsection (1) of section fifteen of the Agriculture Act, 1920. (Repealed for England and Wales and Scotland by Weeds Act 1959 (7 & 8 Eliz. 2. c. 54) and for Northern Ireland by Statute Law Revision Act (Northern Ireland) 1954 (c. 35 (N.I.)))
| War Pensions Act 1921 | 11 & 12 Geo. 5. c. 49 | 19 August 1921 |
An Act to amend the War Pensions Acts, 1915 to 1920, and to provide for certain other matters connected with the administration of pensions, grants, and allowances.
| Criminal Procedure (Scotland) Act 1921 (repealed) | 11 & 12 Geo. 5. c. 50 | 19 August 1921 |
An Act to make provision for the examination and putting in evidence in trials on indictment in Scotland of witnesses and productions not included in lists lodged, and for the remission for sentence to the High Court of Justiciary of persons pleading or found guilty on indictment in the Sheriff Court. (Repealed by Criminal Procedure (Scotland) Act 1975 (c. 21))
| Education Act 1921 (repealed) | 11 & 12 Geo. 5. c. 51 | 19 August 1921 |
An Act to consolidate the enactments relating to Education and certain enactments relating to the Employment of Children and Young Persons. (Repealed by Education Act 1944 (7 & 8 Geo. 6. c. 31))
| Exchequer and Audit Departments Act 1921 | 11 & 12 Geo. 5. c. 52 | 19 August 1921 |
An Act to amend the Exchequer and Audit Departments Acts, 1866 (Note: Exchequer and Audit Departments Act 1866 (29 & 30 Vict. c. 39)) and 1889. (Note: Army and Navy Audit Act 1889 (52 & 53 Vict. c. 31))
| Expiring Laws Continuance Act 1921 (repealed) | 11 & 12 Geo. 5. c. 53 | 19 August 1921 |
An Act to continue certain Expiring Laws. (Repealed by Statute Law Revision Act 1950 (14 Geo. 6. c. 6))
| Public Works Loans Act 1921 (repealed) | 11 & 12 Geo. 5. c. 54 | 19 August 1921 |
An Act to grant money for the purpose of certain Local Loans out of the Local Loans Fund, and for other purposes relating to Local Loans. (Repealed by Statute Law Revision Act 1950 (14 Geo. 6. c. 6))
| Railways Act 1921 | 11 & 12 Geo. 5. c. 55 | 19 August 1921 |
An Act to provide for the reorganisation and further regulation of Railways and the discharge of liabilities arising in connection with the possession of Railways, and otherwise to amend the Law relating to Railways, and to extend the duration of the Rates Advisory Committee. (Repealed for Northern Ireland by Statute Law Revision Act 1953 (2 & 3 Eliz. 2. c. 5), Statute Law Revision Act 1966 (c. 5) and Statute Law Revision (Northern Ireland) Act 1976 (c. 12))
| Supreme Court Officers (Retirement, Pensions, &c.) Act 1921 (repealed) | 11 & 12 Geo. 5. c. 56 | 19 August 1921 |
An Act to make further provision with respect to the appointment, conditions of service and pensions of certain Officers of the Supreme Court in England, and to authorise the abolition of certain offices therein, and for purposes connected therewith. (Repealed by Supreme Court of Judicature (Consolidation) Act 1925 (15 & 16 Geo. 5. c. 49))
| Telegraph (Money) Act 1921 (repealed) | 11 & 12 Geo. 5. c. 57 | 19 August 1921 |
An Act to provide for raising further Money for the purpose of the Telegraph Acts, 1863 to 1920. (Repealed by Statute Law Revision Act 1953 (2 & 3 Eliz. 2. c. 5))
| Trusts (Scotland) Act 1921 (repealed) | 11 & 12 Geo. 5. c. 58 | 19 August 1921 |
An Act to consolidate and amend the Law relating to Trusts in Scotland. (Repealed by Trusts and Succession (Scotland) Act 2024 (asp 2))
| Irish Railways (Settlement of Claims) Act 1921 (repealed) | 11 & 12 Geo. 5. c. 59 | 19 August 1921 |
An Act to provide for the payment of a lump sum in satisfaction of claims of Irish Railway Companies under an agreement with the Government, and otherwise for the distribution of such sum amongst the several companies and for the continuance of a clause in the said agreement. (Repealed by Statute Law Revision Act 1953 (2 & 3 Eliz. 2. c. 5))
| Shops (Early Closing) Act (1920) Amendment Act 1921 (repealed) | 11 & 12 Geo. 5. c. 60 | 19 August 1921 |
An Act to extend the hours during which Sweets, Chocolates, or other Sugar Confectionery, or Ice Cream, may be sold to the Public. (Repealed by Shops (Hours of Closing) Act 1928 (18 & 19 Geo. 5. c. 33))
| Forestry Act 1921 (repealed) | 11 & 12 Geo. 5. c. 61 | 8 November 1921 |
An Act to modify temporarily the provisions of section three of the Forestry Act, 1919. (Note: Forestry Act 1919 (9 & 10 Geo. 5. c. 58)) (Repealed by Statute Law Revision Act 1950 (14 Geo. 6. c. 6))
| Unemployed Workers’ Dependants (Temporary Provision) Act 1921 (repealed) | 11 & 12 Geo. 5. c. 62 | 8 November 1921 |
An Act to make temporary provision for the payment of grants to unemployed workers towards the maintenance of their wives, dependent husbands, and dependent children, and to suspend the operation of section twenty-seven of the Unemployment Insurance Act, 1920. (Repealed for England and Wales and Scotland by Unemployment Insurance Act 1922 (12 & 13 Geo. 5. c. 7) and for Northern Ireland by Unemployment Insurance Act (Northern Ireland) 1922 (12 & 13 Geo. 5. c. 7 (N.I.)))
| Appropriation (No. 2) Act 1921 (repealed) | 11 & 12 Geo. 5. c. 63 | 10 November 1921 |
An Act to apply a sum out of the Consolidated Fund to the service of the year ending on the thirty-first day of March, one thousand nine hundred and twenty-two, and to appropriate the further Supplies granted in this Session of Parliament. (Repealed by Statute Law Revision Act 1950 (14 Geo. 6. c. 6))
| Poor Law Emergency Provisions (Scotland) Act 1921 (repealed) | 11 & 12 Geo. 5. c. 64 | 10 November 1921 |
An Act to authorise during a limited period the provision of Poor Relief to Destitute Able-bodied Persons out of Employment in Scotland, to extend the borrowing powers of Parish Councils, and for other purposes in connection therewith. (Repealed by National Assistance Act 1948 (11 & 12 Geo. 6. c. 29))
| Trade Facilities Act 1921 (repealed) | 11 & 12 Geo. 5. c. 65 | 10 November 1921 |
An Act to authorise the Treasury to guarantee the payment of loans to be applied towards the carrying out of capital undertakings, or in the purchase of articles manufactured in the United Kingdom required for the purposes of any such undertakings, and to amend the Overseas Trade (Credits and Insurance) Act, 1920, and the Overseas Trade (Credits and Insurance) Amendment Act, 1921. (Note: Overseas Trade (Credits and Insurance) Amendment Act 1921 (11 & 12 Geo. 5. c. 26)) (Repealed by Statute Law (Repeals) Act 1974 (c. 22))
| National Health Insurance (Prolongation of Insurance) Act 1921 (repealed) | 11 & 12 Geo. 5. c. 66 | 10 November 1921 |
An Act to extend temporarily the period during which persons who are unemployed may remain insured under the general provisions of the National Health Insurance Acts, 1911 to 1921. (Repealed by National Health Insurance Act 1928 (18 & 19 Geo. 5. c. 14))
| Local Authorities (Financial Provisions) Act 1921 (repealed) | 11 & 12 Geo. 5. c. 67 | 10 November 1921 |
An Act to make further provision with respect to the Metropolitan Common Poor Fund and with respect to rating and to the finance of certain Local and Public Authorities. (Repealed by Local Government Finance Act (Northern Ireland) 1967 (c. 2 (N.I.)) and Statute Law (Repeals) Act 1975 (c. 10))

=== Local acts ===
| Short title | Citation | Royal assent |
Long title
| Corporation of London (Bridge) Act 1921 | 11 & 12 Geo. 5. c. i | 28 April 1921 |
An Act to extend the time for the completion of the bridge over the River Thames between Blackfriars and Southwark Bridges.
| Chatham and District Light Railways Company Act 1921 (repealed) | 11 & 12 Geo. 5. c. ii | 28 April 1921 |
An Act to convert the shares in the capital of the Chatham and District Light Railways Company into shares of one pound each and for other purposes. (Repealed by Chatham and District Traction Act 1955 (4 & 5 Eliz. 2. c. xiv))
| Liverpool Mineral and Metal Storage Company, Limited (Delivery Warrants) Act 1921 | 11 & 12 Geo. 5. c. iii | 28 April 1921 |
An Act to enable the Liverpool Mineral and Metal Storage Company Limited to issue transferable certificates and warrants for the delivery of goods and for other purposes.
| South Metropolitan Gas Act 1921 | 11 & 12 Geo. 5. c. iv | 28 April 1921 |
An Act to enable to South Metropolitan Gas Company to sell gas on a heat unit basis to make new provision as to charges for the gas and application of the profits of the Company to extend the powers of the Company to amalgamate with or purchase other undertakings and for other purposes.
| Forth Conservancy Order Confirmation Act 1921 (repealed) | 11 & 12 Geo. 5. c. v | 12 May 1921 |
An Act to confirm a Provisional Order under the Private Legislation Procedure (Scotland) Act 1899 (Note: Private Legislation Procedure (Scotland) Act 1899 (62 & 63 Vict. c. 47)) relating to the Forth Conservancy. (Repealed by Statute Law (Repeals) Act 1986 (c. 12))
| | Forth Conservancy Order 1921 Provisional Order for the constitution of a Board of Conservators for the Preservation Maintenance and Improvement of part of the River and Firth of Forth; for the Transfer to the Board of the Undertaking of the Commissions of the Forth Navigation; and for other purposes. | |
| Pilotage Orders Confirmation (No. 1) Act 1921 (repealed) | 11 & 12 Geo. 5. c. vi | 12 May 1921 |
An Act to confirm certain Pilotage Orders made by the Board of Trade under the Pilotage Act 1913 (Note: Pilotage Act 1913 (2 & 3 Geo. 5. c. 31)) relating to pilotage in the Pilotage Outport Districts under the jurisdiction of the Corporation of the Trinity House of Deptford Strond. (Repealed by Statute Law (Repeals) Act 1995 (c. 44))
| | Aberdovey Pilotage Order 1921 Aberdovey Pilotage Order. | |
| | Barnstaple Pilotage Order 1921 Barnstaple Pilotage Order. | |
| | Barrow Pilotage Order 1921 Barrow Pilotage Order. | |
| | Baurmaris and Carnarvon Pilotage Order 1921 Baurmaris and Carnarvon Pilotage Order. | |
| | Bridgwater Pilotage Order 1921 Bridgwater Pilotage Order. | |
| | Bridport Pilotage Order 1921 Bridport Pilotage Order. | |
| | Brixham Pilotage Order 1921 Brixham Pilotage Order. | |
| | Carlisle Pilotage Order 1921 Carlisle Pilotage Order. | |
| | Dartmouth Pilotage Order 1921 Dartmouth Pilotage Order. | |
| | Exeter Pilotage Order 1921 Exeter Pilotage Order. | |
| | Falmouth Pilotage Order 1921 Falmouth Pilotage Order. | |
| | Fleetwood Pilotage Order 1921 Fleetwood Pilotage Order. | |
| | Fowey Pilotage Order 1921 Fowey Pilotage Order. | |
| | Harwich Pilotage Order 1921 Harwich Pilotage Order. | |
| | Holyhead Pilotage Order 1921 Holyhead Pilotage Order. | |
| | Ilfracombe Pilotage Order 1921 Ilfracombe Pilotage Order. | |
| | Ipswich Pilotage Order 1921 Ipswich Pilotage Order. | |
| | Isle of Wight Pilotage Order 1921 Isle of Wight Pilotage Order. | |
| | Lowestoft Pilotage Order 1921 Lowestoft Pilotage Order. | |
| | Milford Pilotage Order 1921 Milford Pilotage Order. | |
| | Neath Pilotage Order 1921 Neath Pilotage Order. | |
| | Newhaven Pilotage Order 1921 Newhaven Pilotage Order. | |
| | Orford Haven Pilotage Order 1921 Orford Haven Pilotage Order. | |
| | Padstow Pilotage Order 1921 Padstow Pilotage Order. | |
| | Penzance Pilotage Order 1921 Penzance Pilotage Order. | |
| | Plymouth Pilotage Order 1921 Plymouth Pilotage Order. | |
| | Poole Pilotage Order 1921 Poole Pilotage Order. | |
| | Portmadoc Pilotage Order 1921 Portmadoc Pilotage Order. | |
| | Preston Pilotage Order 1921 Preston Pilotage Order. | |
| | Rye Pilotage Order 1921 Rye Pilotage Order. | |
| | St. Ives Pilotage Order 1921 St. Ives Pilotage Order. | |
| | Scilly Pilotage Order 1921 Scilly Pilotage Order. | |
| | Shoreham Pilotage Order 1921 Shoreham Pilotage Order. | |
| | Teignmouth Pilotage Order 1921 Teignmouth Pilotage Order. | |
| | Wells Pilotage Order 1921 Wells Pilotage Order. | |
| | Weymouth Pilotage Order 1921 Weymouth Pilotage Order. | |
| | Whitehaven and Maryport Pilotage Order 1921 Whitehaven and Maryport Pilotage Order. | |
| | Woodbridge Pilotage Order 1921 Woodbridge Pilotage Order. | |
| | Yarmouth and Southwold Pilotage Order 1921 Yarmouth and Southwold Pilotage Order. | |
| North British Railway Order Confirmation Act 1921 | 11 & 12 Geo. 5. c. vii | 12 May 1921 |
An Act to confirm a Provisional Order under the Private Legislation Procedure (Scotland) Act 1899 relating to the North British Railway.
| | North British Railway Order 1921 Provisional Order to confer further powers upon the North British Railway Company. | |
| Ionian Bank (Limited) Act 1921 | 11 & 12 Geo. 5. c. viii | 12 May 1921 |
An Act to confer further powers on the Ionian Bank Limited and for other purposes.
| Oxford Motor Services Act 1921 (repealed) | 11 & 12 Geo. 5. c. ix | 12 May 1921 |
An Act to confer further powers on the City of Oxford Motor Services Limited. (Repealed by Oxford Motor Services Act 1951 (14 & 15 Geo. 6. c. ix))
| Borough of Portsmouth Waterworks Act 1921 | 11 & 12 Geo. 5. c. x | 12 May 1921 |
An Act to increase the rates for the supply of water by the Borough of Portsmouth Waterworks Company and for other purposes.
| Bristol Waterworks Act 1921 | 11 & 12 Geo. 5. c. xi | 12 May 1921 |
An Act for authorising the Bristol Waterworks Company to construct new works for increasing the charges of the Company for extending their limits of supply and for other purposes.
| Dundee Gas Order Confirmation Act 1921 (repealed) | 11 & 12 Geo. 5. c. xii | 1 July 1921 |
An Act to confirm a Provisional Order under the Private Legislation Procedure (Scotland) Act 1899 relating to Dundee Gas. (Repealed by Statute Law (Repeals) Act 1998 (c. 43))
| | Dundee Gas Order 1921 Provisional Order to authorise the Dundee Gas Commissioners to acquire and excamb land for the purposes of their undertaking to confer various further powers on them and for other purposes. | |
| Perth Corporation Order Confirmation Act 1921 | 11 & 12 Geo. 5. c. xiii | 1 July 1921 |
An Act to confirm a Provisional Order under the Burgh Police (Scotland) Act 1892 (Note: Burgh Police (Scotland) Act 1892 (55 & 56 Vict. c. 55)) relating to Perth Burgh General Assessment.
| | Perth Corporation Order 1921 Perth Corporation. Provisional Order. | |
| Hamilton Water and Gas Order Confirmation Act 1921 | 11 & 12 Geo. 5. c. xiv | 1 July 1921 |
An Act to confirm a Provisional Order under the Burgh Police (Scotland) Act 1892 relating to Hamilton Water and Gas.
| | Hamilton Water and Gas Order 1921 Hamilton Water and Gas. Provisional Order. | |
| Glasgow Corporation Order Confirmation Act 1921 | 11 & 12 Geo. 5. c. xv | 1 July 1921 |
An Act to confirm a Provisional Order under the Private Legislation Procedure (Scotland) Act 1899 relating to Glasgow Corporation.
| | Glasgow Corporation Order 1921 Provisional Order to confer further powers on the Corporation of the city of Glasgow in connexion with their gas city improvements parks sewage water and markets undertakings to borrow money for the purposes of the gas city improvements parks and sewage undertakings to extend the time for the compulsory purchase of lands authorised by the Glasgow Water Order 1915 (Note: Glasgow Water Order 1915 (5 & 6 Geo. 5. c. cvi)) to extend the power to charge rates for slaughter houses and markets to amend the provisions of the Glasgow Police Act 1866 relating to the police assessment to make provision with respect to employment agencies the lending of money to Parish Councils and for other purposes. | |
| Pilotage Orders Confirmation (No. 2) Act 1921 (repealed) | 11 & 12 Geo. 5. c. xvi | 1 July 1921 |
An Act to confirm certain Pilotage Orders made by the Board of Trade under the Pilotage Act 1913 relating to pilotage in the Pilotage Districts of Belfast Colerain Londonderry and Portrush. (Repealed by Statute Law (Repeals) Act 1995 (c. 44))
| | Belfast Pilotage Order 1921 Belfast Pilotage Order. | |
| | Colerain Pilotage Order 1921 Colerain Pilotage Order. | |
| | Londonderry Pilotage Order 1921 Londonderry Pilotage Order. | |
| | Portrush Pilotage Order 1921 Portrush Pilotage Order. | |
| Ministry of Health Provisional Orders Confirmation (No. 1) Act 1921 | 11 & 12 Geo. 5. c. xvii | 1 July 1921 |
An Act to confirm certain Provisional Orders of the Minister of Health relating to Altrincham Ashford Barnes Gillingham and Ramsgate.
| | Altrincham Order 1921 Provisional Order to enable the Urban District Council of Altrincham to put in force the Compulsory Clauses of the Lands Clauses Acts. | |
| | Ashford Order 1921 Provisional Order to enable the Urban District Council of Ashford to put in force the Compulsory Clauses of the Lands Clauses Acts. | |
| | Barnes Order 1921 Provisional Order to enable the Urban District Council of Barnes to put in force the Compulsory Clauses of the Lands Clauses Acts. | |
| | Gillingham Order 1921 Provisional Order to enable the Council of the Borough of Gillingham to put in force the Compulsory Clauses of the Lands Clauses Acts. | |
| | Ramsgate Order 1921 Provisional Order to enable the Council of the Borough of Ramsgate to put in force the Compulsory Clauses of the Lands Clauses Acts. | |
| Ministry of Health Provisional Orders Confirmation (No. 2) Act 1921 | 11 & 12 Geo. 5. c. xviii | 1 July 1921 |
An Act to confirm certain Provisional Orders of the Minister of Health relating to Cleethorpes Loughborough Middleton Swansea and the Goole Joint Hospital District.
| | Cleethorpes Order 1921 Provisional Order for altering the Cleethorpes Improvement Act 1902. (Note: Cleethorpes Improvement Act 1902 (2 Edw. 7. c. cliv)) | |
| | Loughborough Order 1921 Provisional Order for altering the Loughborough Local Board Act 1868. (Note: Loughborough Local Board Act 1868 (31 & 32 Vict. c. xvi)) | |
| | Middleton Order 1921 Provisional Order for altering the Middleton Corporation Act 1910. (Note: Middleton Corporation Act 1910 (10 Edw. 7 & 1 Geo. 5. c. cxxx)) | |
| | Swansea Order 1921 Provisional Order for altering the Swansea Municipal Corporation Act 1863. (Note: Swansea Municipal Corporation Act 1863 (26 & 27 Vict. c. xiii)) | |
| | Goole Joint Hospital Order 1921 Provisional Order for altering the Local Government Board's Provisional Orders Confirmation (No. 9) Act 1907. (Note: Local Government Board's Provisional Orders Confirmation (No. 9) Act 1907 (7 Edw. 7. c. clix)) | |
| Ministry of Health Provisional Orders Confirmation (No. 3) Act 1921 | 11 & 12 Geo. 5. c. xix | 1 July 1921 |
An Act to confirm certain Provisional Orders of the Minister of Health relating to Chadderton Glossop Ilfracombe Kettering Padiham and the North Staffordshire Joint Small-pox Hospital District.
| | Chadderton Order 1921 Provisional Order for altering the Local Government Board's Provisional Orders Confirmation (No. 5) Act 1902. (Note: Local Government Board's Provisional Orders Confirmation (No. 5) Act 1902 (2 Edw. 7. c. lxxxi)) | |
| | Glossop Order 1921 Provisional Order for partially repealing altering and amending the Local Act 7 Vict. Cap. viii. (Note: Glossop Market Act 1844 (7 & 8 Vict. c. viii)) | |
| | Ilfracombe Order 1921 Provisional Order for altering and amending the Ilfracombe Improvement Act 1900. (Note: Ilfracombe Improvement Act 1900 (63 & 64 Vict. c. ccxiii)) | |
| | Kettering Order 1921 Provisional Order for altering the Kettering Water Act 1898 (Note: Kettering Water Act 1898 (61 & 62 Vict. c. cliii)) the Kettering Urban District Water Act 1901 (Note: Kettering Urban District Water Act 1901 (1 Edw. 7. c. lxxxv)) the Kettering Improvement Act 1904 (Note: Kettering Improvement Act 1904 (4 Edw. 7. c. xxiii)) and the Kettering Water Act 1906. (Note: Kettering Water Act 1906 (6 Edw. 7. c. lxv)) | |
| | Padiham Order 1921 Provisional Order for partially repealing altering and amending the Padiham Local Board Act 1882 (Note: Padiham Local Board Act 1882 (45 & 46 Vict. c. cix)) and the Padiham Local Board Act 1889. (Note: Padiham Local Board Act 1889 (52 & 53 Vict. c. lii)) | |
| | North Staffordshire Joint Smallpox Hospital Order 1921 Provisional Order for altering certain Confirming Acts. | |
| Herts and Essex Water Act 1921 (repealed) | 11 & 12 Geo. 5. c. xx | 1 July 1921 |
An Act to extend the area of supply for the Herts and Essex Waterworks Company Limited and for other purposes. (Repealed by Lee Valley Water Act 1959 (7 & 8 Eliz. 2. c. li))
| Westgate and Birchington Water Act 1921 (repealed) | 11 & 12 Geo. 5. c. xxi | 1 July 1921 |
An Act to confer further powers on the Westgate and Birchington Water Company and for other purposes. (Repealed by Kent Water Act 1955 (4 & 5 Eliz. 2. c. xi))
| Cambridge University and Town Waterworks Act 1921 | 11 & 12 Geo. 5. c. xxii | 1 July 1921 |
An Act to confer further powers on the Cambridge University and Town Waterworks Company; and for other purposes.
| Falmouth Docks Act 1921 (repealed) | 11 & 12 Geo. 5. c. xxiii | 1 July 1921 |
An Act to confer further powers on the Falmouth Docks Company; to change the name of the Company; and for other purposes. (Repealed by Falmouth Docks Act 1959 (7 & 8 Eliz. 2. c. xl))
| Sutton District Waterworks Act 1921 | 11 & 12 Geo. 5. c. xxiv | 1 July 1921 |
An Act to authorize the Sutton District Water Company to construct additional waterworks and for other purposes.
| Preston Corporation Act 1921 | 11 & 12 Geo. 5. c. xxv | 1 July 1921 |
An Act to confer further powers upon the Corporation of Preston with reference to their Water Undertaking; to increase the Water Rates Harbour Tolls Dock Rates Light Dues and Market Tolls leviable by the Corporation; to make better provision for the Health Local Government and Finance of the Borough of Preston; to consolidate the Local Rates leviable in the Borough; and for other purposes.
| Eastbourne Waterworks Act 1921 | 11 & 12 Geo. 5. c. xxvi | 1 July 1921 |
An Act for altering the rates for the supply of water by the Eastbourne Waterworks Company and for other purposes.
| Limerick Markets Act 1921 | 11 & 12 Geo. 5. c. xxvii | 1 July 1921 |
An Act to increase the tolls and charges leviable by the Limerick Market Trustees and for other purposes.
| Westminster City Council (General Powers) Act 1921 | 11 & 12 Geo. 5. c. xxviii | 1 July 1921 |
An Act to make provision with regard to the union of parishes in the city of Westminster the ownership of St. James's Vestry Hall superannuation allowances pensions and gratuities to confer various powers upon the Westminster City Council and for other purposes.
| Lymington Rural District Council Act 1921 | 11 & 12 Geo. 5. c. xxix | 1 July 1921 |
An Act to confer powers on the Lymington Rural District Council with reference to the borrowing of money; and for other purposes.
| Wrexham and East Denbighshire Water Act 1921 | 11 & 12 Geo. 5. c. xxx | 28 July 1921 |
An Act for extending the limits of supply of the Wrexham and East Denbighshire Water Company for authorising the Company to construct new works to raise further capital for increasing the charges of the Company and for other purposes.
| British Dyestuffs Corporation (Railways Transfer) Act 1921 | 11 & 12 Geo. 5. c. xxxi | 28 July 1921 |
An Act to transfer to and vest in British Dyestuffs Corporation Limited certain Railways and Works in the City of Manchester; and for other purposes.
| Tendring Hundred Water and Gas Act 1921 | 11 & 12 Geo. 5. c. xxxii | 28 July 1921 |
An Act to amend the statutory provisions relating to the Tendring Hundred Waterworks Company; to confer further powers upon that Company; and for other purposes.
| Cattedown Wharves Act 1921 | 11 & 12 Geo. 5. c. xxxiii | 28 July 1921 |
An Act to make further provision with respect to the Cattedown Wharves, Plymouth.
| Mid-Glamorgan Water Act 1921 | 11 & 12 Geo. 5. c. xxxiv | 28 July 1921 |
An Act to transfer to and vest in the Mid-Glamorgan Water Board the Water Undertaking of the Bridgend (Glamorganshire) Gas and Water Company; to extend the limits of the Board for the Supply of Water; and for other purposes.
| North Eastern Railway Act 1921 | 11 & 12 Geo. 5. c. xxxv | 28 July 1921 |
An Act to confer further powers on the North Eastern Railway Company for the construction of new railways and other works and the acquisition of lands to authorise the said Company and the Hull and Barnsley Railway Company to acquire lands and property and a portion of the undertaking of the Hedon Haven Commissioners to extend the time limited by certain Acts for the completion of works and for the compulsory purchase of lands and for other purposes.
| Earby Urban District Council Act 1921 | 11 & 12 Geo. 5. c. xxxvi | 28 July 1921 |
An Act to enable the Earby Urban District Council to acquire the undertakings of the Earby Water Company Limited and the Kelbrook Water Company Limited and to make further provision in regard to the water supply of the district and for other purposes.
| Radcliffe and Little Lever Joint Gas Board Act 1921 | 11 & 12 Geo. 5. c. xxxvii | 28 July 1921 |
An Act to constitute and incorporate a Joint Board consisting of representatives of the urban district councils of Radcliffe and Little Lever and to transfer to and vest in such Board the undertaking of the Radcliffe and Pilkington Gas Company and for other purposes.
| Cardiff Gas Act 1921 | 11 & 12 Geo. 5. c. xxxviii | 28 July 1921 |
An Act to empower the Cardiff Gas Light and Coke Company to sell gas on a heat unit basis; to make new provisions as to charges for gas and the application of the profits of the Company; to confer further financial powers upon the Company; to extend the limits of supply and for other purposes.
| Croydon Corporation Water Act 1921 (repealed) | 11 & 12 Geo. 5. c. xxxix | 28 July 1921 |
An Act to empower the Mayor Aldermen and Burgesses of the county borough of Croydon to purchase a well and pumping station situate within that borough from the Metropolitan Water Board to confer further powers upon them in regard to their water undertaking and for other purposes. (Repealed by Croydon Corporation Act 1960 (8 & 9 Eliz. 2. c. xl))
| Middlesex County Council (General Powers) Act 1921 (repealed) | 11 & 12 Geo. 5. c. xl | 28 July 1921 |
An Act to extend the time for the construction of new roads and works authorised by the Middlesex County Council (Great West Road and Finance) Act 1914 (Note: Middlesex County Council (Great West Road and Finance) Act 1914 (4 & 5 Geo. 5. c. xcviii)) and the acquisition of lands therefor to confer further powers upon the Middlesex County Council in relation to the prevention of the pollution and obstruction of streams in the county of Middlesex to authorise the Council to establish superannuation and fire insurance funds and to regulate lying-in homes and for other purposes. (Repealed by Middlesex County Council Act 1944 (7 & 8 Geo. 6. c. xxi))
| Waltham and Cheshunt Gas Act 1921 | 11 & 12 Geo. 5. c. xli | 28 July 1921 |
An Act to confer further powers upon the Waltham Abbey and Cheshunt Gas and Coke Company; to alter the name of the Company; and for other purposes.
| Wandsworth, Wimbledon and Epsom District Gas Act 1921 | 11 & 12 Geo. 5. c. xlii | 28 July 1921 |
An Act to confer further powers on the Wandsworth Wimbledon and Epsom District Gas Company; and for other purposes.
| East Surrey Water Act 1921 | 11 & 12 Geo. 5. c. xliii | 28 July 1921 |
An Act to confer further powers on the East Surrey Water Company.
| Lochaber Water Power Act 1921 | 11 & 12 Geo. 5. c. xliv | 28 July 1921 |
An Act to incorporate and confer powers upon the Lochaber Power Company and for other purposes.
| Harrogate Gas Act 1921 | 11 & 12 Geo. 5. c. xlv | 28 July 1921 |
An Act to amend the provisions relating to the method of charge by the Harrogate Gas Company for gas supplied by them and to the dividends on their ordinary capital to consolidate the ordinary capital of the Company to authorise the Company to raise additional capital and for other purposes.
| Nelson Corporation Act 1921 | 11 & 12 Geo. 5. c. xlvi | 28 July 1921 |
An Act to authorise the Mayor Aldermen and Burgesses of the Borough of Nelson to provide and work Motor Omnibuses to make further provision with regard to the supply of electricity with regard to the health local government and improvement of the borough the consolidation of the rates in the borough and for other purposes.
| Sunderland and South Shields Water Act 1921 | 11 & 12 Geo. 5. c. xlvii | 28 July 1921 |
An Act for authorising the Sunderland and South Shields Water Company to construct New Works and to raise Additional Capital; for increasing the Charges of the Company and extending their Limits of Supply; and for other purposes.
| Colne Corporation Act 1921 | 11 & 12 Geo. 5. c. xlviii | 28 July 1921 |
An Act to enable the Corporation of Colne to run omnibuses and to make further provision for the improvement health and good government of the Borough.
| Swansea Gas Act 1921 | 11 & 12 Geo. 5. c. xlix | 28 July 1921 |
An Act to empower the Swansea Gas Light Company to sell gas on a heat unit basis; to make new provisions as to charges for gas and the application of the profits of the Company; to raise additional capital and for other purposes.
| London County Council (General Powers) Act 1921 | 11 & 12 Geo. 5. c. l | 28 July 1921 |
An Act to empower the London County Council to acquire lands to amend the law relation to employment agencies and lying-in homes and for other purposes.
| Manchester Corporation Waterworks Act 1921 | 11 & 12 Geo. 5. c. li | 28 July 1921 |
An Act to empower the Lord Mayor Aldermen and Citizens of the city of Manchester to construct an aqueduct in substitution for part of the Haweswater Aqueduct authorized by the Manchester Corporation Act 1919. (Note: Manchester Corporation Act 1919 (9 & 10 Geo. 5. c. cxix))
| John Newland Endowment Order Confirmation Act 1921 | 11 & 12 Geo. 5. c. lii | 28 July 1921 |
An Act to confirm a Provisional Order under the Burgh Police (Scotland) Act 1892 relating to the John Newland Endowment.
| | John Newland Endowment Order 1920 (Note: Although passed in 1921, the short title is specified as the John Newland Endowment Order 1920.) Provisional Order to create a bursary scheme for behoof of the parish of Bathgate with the funds and property of the John Newland Trust at present forming the endowment of the Bathgate Academy and with the price of the said academy when received from the education authority of the county of Linlithgow and for other purposes. | |
| Glasgow Deaf and Dumb Institution Order Confirmation Act 1921 | 11 & 12 Geo. 5. c. liii | 28 July 1921 |
An Act to confirm a Provisional Order under the Burgh Police (Scotland) Act 1892 relating to
| | Glasgow Deaf and Dumb Institution Order 1921 Provisional Order to transfer to and vest in the Education Authority for the Burgh of Glasgow certain school buildings and other property in Glasgow known as the Deaf and Dumb Institution to incorporate The Glasgow Society for the Education of Deaf and Dumb to confer further powers on the Society to provide for the management of its affairs and for other purposes. | |
| Paisley Gas Order Confirmation Act 1921 | 11 & 12 Geo. 5. c. liv | 28 July 1921 |
An Act to confirm a Provisional Order under the Burgh Police (Scotland) Act 1892 relating to
| | Paisley Gas Order 1921 Paisley Gas. Provisional Order. | |
| Pilotage Orders Confirmation (No. 3) Act 1921 (repealed) | 11 & 12 Geo. 5. c. lv | 28 July 1921 |
An Act to confirm certain Pilotage Orders made by the Board of Trade under the Pilotage Act 1913 relating to pilotage in the Pilotage Districts of Arbroath Elgin and Lossiemouth Eyemouth Irvine Thurso and Wick. (Repealed by Statute Law (Repeals) Act 1995 (c. 44))
| | Arbroath Pilotage Order 1921 Arbroath Pilotage Order. | |
| | Elgin and Lossiemouth Pilotage Order 1921 Elgin and Lossiemouth Pilotage Order. | |
| | Eyemouth Pilotage Order 1921 Eyemouth Pilotage Order. | |
| | Irvine Pilotage Order 1921 Irvine Pilotage Order. | |
| | Thurso Pilotage Order 1921 Thurso Pilotage Order. | |
| | Wick Pilotage Order 1921 Wick Pilotage Order. | |
| Pilotage Orders Confirmation (No. 4) Act 1921 (repealed) | 11 & 12 Geo. 5. c. lvi | 28 July 1921 |
An Act to confirm certain Pilotage Orders made by the Board of Trade under the Pilotage Act 1913 relating to pilotage in the Pilotage Districts of Ballina Limerick Tralee and Fenit and Westport. (Repealed by Statute Law (Repeals) Act 1995 (c. 44))
| | Ballina Pilotage Order 1921 Ballina Pilotage Order. | |
| | Limerick Pilotage Order 1921 Limerick Pilotage Order. | |
| | Tralee and Fenit Pilotage Order 1921 Tralee and Fenit Pilotage Order. | |
| | Westport Pilotage Order 1921 Westport Pilotage Order. | |
| Ministry of Health Provisional Order Confirmation (Dover Extension) Act 1921 (repealed) | 11 & 12 Geo. 5. c. lvii | 28 July 1921 |
An Act to confirm a Provisional Order of the Minister of Health relating to Dover. (Repealed by County of Kent Act 1981 (c. xviii))
| | Dover (Extension) Order 1921 Provisional Order made in pursuance of the Local Government Act 1888 (Note: Local Government Act 1888 (51 & 52 Vict. c. 41)) for extending a Borough. | |
| Ministry of Health Provisional Order Confirmation (Shaftesbury Extension) Act 1921 | 11 & 12 Geo. 5. c. lviii | 28 July 1921 |
An Act to confirm a Provisional Order of the Minister of Health relating to Shaftesbury.
| | Shaftesbury (Extension) Order 1921 Provisional Order made in pursuance of the Local Government Act 1888 for the extension of a Borough. | |
| Ministry of Health Provisional Order Confirmation (Taunton Extension) Act 1921 | 11 & 12 Geo. 5. c. lix | 28 July 1921 |
An Act to confirm a Provisional Order of the Minister of Health relating to Taunton.
| | Taunton (Extension) Order 1921 Provisional Order made in pursuance of the Local Government Act 1888 for the extension of a Borough. | |
| Ministry of Health Provisional Orders Confirmation (No. 4) Act 1921 | 11 & 12 Geo. 5. c. lx | 28 July 1921 |
An Act to confirm certain Provisional Orders of the Minister of Health relating to Bognor Paignton Westhoughton and Whiston (Rural).
| | Bognor Order 1921 Provisional Order to enable the Urban District Council of Bognor to put in force the Compulsory Clauses of the Lands Clauses Acts. | |
| | Paignton Order 1921 Provisional Order to enable the Urban District Council of Paignton to put in force the Compulsory Clauses of the Lands Clauses Acts. | |
| | Westhoughton Order 1921 Provisional Order to enable the Urban District Council of Westhoughton to put in force the Compulsory Clauses of the Lands Clauses Acts. | |
| | Whiston Rural Order 1921 Provisional Order to enable the Rural District Council of Whiston to put in force the Compulsory Clauses of the Lands Clauses Acts. | |
| Ministry of Health Provisional Orders Confirmation (No. 5) Act 1921 | 11 & 12 Geo. 5. c. lxi | 28 July 1921 |
An Act to confirm certain Provisional Orders of the Minister of Health relating to Oswestry Wakefield the Cranbrook and Tenterden Joint Hospital District the Crediton Joint Cemetery District and the North East Kent United Districts.
| | Oswestry Order 1921 Provisional Order for altering the Oswestry Markets and Fairs Act 1848 (Note: Oswestry Markets and Fairs Act 1848 (11 & 12 Vict. c. xxxiii)) and the Oswestry (Corporation) Water and Markets Act 1885. (Note: Oswestry (Corporation) Water and Markets Act 1885 (48 & 49 Vict. c. xliii)) | |
| | Wakefield Order 1921 Provisional Order for altering the Wakefield Corporation Market Act 1900 (Note: Wakefield Corporation Market Act 1900 (63 & 64 Vict. c. lxxx)) and the Wakefield Waterworks Act 1862. (Note: Wakefield Waterworks Act 1862 (25 & 26 Vict. c. xcix)) | |
| | Cranbrook and Tenterden Joint Hospital Order 1921 Provisional Order for forming a United District under Section 279 of the Public Health Act 1875. (Note: Public Health Act 1875 (38 & 39 Vict. c. 55)) | |
| | Crediton Joint Cemetery Order 1921 Provisional Order for forming a United District under Section 279 of the Public Health Act 1875. | |
| | North East Kent United Districts (Medical Officer of Health) Order 1921 Provisional Order for partially repealing a Confirming Act. (Note: Local Government Board's Provisional Orders Confirmation (No. 10) Act 1910 (10 Edw. 7 & 1 Geo. 5. c. lxxxvii)) | |
| Ministry of Health Provisional Orders Confirmation (No. 6) Act 1921 | 11 & 12 Geo. 5. c. lxii | 28 July 1921 |
An Act to confirm certain Provisional Orders of the Minister of Health relating to Broadstairs and St. Peter's Caerphilly Ripon Sheffield Southend-on-Sea Whitley and Monkseaton the Shrewsbury and Atcham Joint Hospital District and the County of Huntingdon.
| | Broadstairs and St. Peter's Order 1921 Provisional Order for altering the Broadstairs and St. Peter's Water and Improvement Act 1901 (Note: Broadstairs and St. Peter's Water and Improvement Act 1901 (1 Edw. 7. c. ccx)) and the Broadstairs and St. Peter's Urban District Water Act 1907. (Note: Broadstairs and St. Peter's Urban District Water Act 1907 (7 Edw. 7. c. cxxvi)) | |
| | Caerphilly Order 1921 Provisional Order for partially repealing altering and amending the Caerphilly Urban District Council Act 1917. (Note: Caerphilly Urban District Council Act 1917 (7 & 8 Geo. 5. c. xlix)) | |
| | Ripon Order 1921 Provisional Order for altering the Ripon Corporation Act 1886 (Note: Ripon Corporation Act 1886 (49 & 50 Vict. c. lxvii)) and the Local Government Board's Provisional Orders Confirmation (No. 11) Act 1899. (Note: Local Government Board's Provisional Orders Confirmation (No. 11) Act 1899 (62 & 63 Vict. c. cxiii)) | |
| | Sheffield Order 1921 Provisional Order for altering the Sheffield Corporation (Consolidation) Act 1918. (Note: Sheffield Corporation (Consolidation) Act 1918 (8 & 9 Geo. 5. c. lxi)) | |
| | Southend-on-Sea Order 1921 Provisional Order for altering the Southend Local Board Act 1887. (Note: Southend Local Board Act 1887 (50 & 51 Vict. c. v)) | |
| | Whitley and Monkseaton Order 1921 Provisional Order to enable the Urban District Council of Whitley and Monkseaton to put in force the Compulsory Clauses of the Lands Clauses Acts. | |
| | Shrewsbury and Atcham Joint Hospital Order 1921 Provisional Order for forming a United District under Section 279 of the Public Health Act 1875. | |
| | County of Huntingdon Order 1921 Provisional Order made in pursuance of subsection (2) of Section 69 of the Local Government Act 1888. | |
| Ministry of Health Provisional Orders Confirmation (No. 9) Act 1921 | 11 & 12 Geo. 5. c. lxiii | 28 July 1921 |
An Act to confirm certain Provisional Orders of the Minister of Health relating to Bournemouth Gravesend Margate and Rotherham (Rural).
| | Bournemouth Order 1921 Provisional Order to enable the Urban Sanitary Authority for the Borough of Bournemouth to put in force the Compulsory Clauses of the Lands Clauses Acts. | |
| | Gravesend Order 1921 Provisional Order to enable the Urban Authority for the Borough of Gravesend to put in force the Compulsory Clauses of the Lands Clauses Acts. | |
| | Margate Order 1921 Provisional Order to enable the Council of the Borough of Margate to put in force the Compulsory Clauses of the Lands Clauses Acts. | |
| | Rotherham Rural Order 1921 Provisional Order to enable the Rural District Council of Rotherham to put in force the Compulsory Clauses of the Lands Clauses Acts. | |
| Ministry of Health Provisional Orders Confirmation (Water) Act 1921 | 11 & 12 Geo. 5. c. lxiv | 28 July 1921 |
An Act to confirm certain Provisional Orders of the Minister of Health relating to Blandford Water Bournemouth Gas and Water Brompton Chatham Gillingham and Rochester Water and Woodbridge District Water.
| | Blandford Water Order 1921 Provisional Order under the Gas and Water Works Facilities Act 1870 (Note: Gas and Water Works Facilities Act 1870 (33 & 34 Vict. c. 70)) and the Gas and Water Works Facilities Act 1870 Amendment Act 1873 (Note: Gas and Water Works Facilities Act 1870 Amendment Act 1873 (36 & 37 Vict. c. 89)) to increase the rates for the supply of water by the Blandford Waterworks Company Limited and for other purposes. | |
| | Bournemouth Gas and Water (Increase of Water Charges) Order 1921 Provisional Order under the Gas and Water Works Facilities Act 1870 and the Gas and Water Works Facilities Act 1870 Amendment Act 1873 to increase the rates rents and charges for the supply of water or in connexion therewith authorised by the Bournemouth Gas and Water Acts 1873 to 1919. | |
| | Brompton Chatham Gillingham and Rochester Water Order 1921 Provisional Order under the Gas and Water Works Facilities Act 1870 and the Gas and Water Works Facilities Act 1870 Amendment Act 1873 for conferring further powers on the Brompton Chatham Gillingham and Rochester Waterworks Company. | |
| | Woodbridge District Water Order 1921 Provisional Order under the Gas and Water Works Facilities Act 1870 and the Gas and Water Works Facilities Act 1870 Amendment Act 1873 for empowering the Woodbridge District Water Company to maintain and continue waterworks for increasing the charges of the Company and for other purposes. | |
| Local Government Board (Ireland) Provisional Orders Confirmation Act 1921 | 11 & 12 Geo. 5. c. lxv | 28 July 1921 |
An Act to confirm certain Provisional Orders of the Local Local Government Board for Ireland relating to the County Borough of Belfast and the Urban Districts of Enniskillen and Pembroke.
| | Belfast Order 1921 Provisional Order for altering Scales of Stallages Rents Tolls and Charges for use of Markets and Weighbridges. | |
| | Enniskillen Urban District Order 1921 Provisional Order for altering certain provisions of the Enniskillen Borough Improvement Act 1870. (Note: Enniskillen Borough Improvement Act 1870 (33 & 34 Vict. c. cxliii)) | |
| | Pembroke (Public Health Municipal Undertakings) Order 1921 Provisional Order to enable the Pembroke Urban District Council to put in force the Compulsory Clauses of the Lands Clauses Acts. | |
| Provisional Order (Marriages) Confirmation Act 1921 (repealed) | 11 & 12 Geo. 5. c. lxvi | 28 July 1921 |
An Act to confirm a Provisional Order made by one of His Majesty's Principal Secretaries of State under the Provisional Order (Marriages) Act 1905. (Note: Provisional Order (Marriages) Act 1905 (5 Edw. 7. c. 23)) (Repealed by Statute Law (Repeals) Act 1977 (c. 18))
| | Saint Luke Sheepscar and Saint Barnabas Brewery Field. | |
| Pier and Harbour Orders Confirmation (No. 2) Act 1921 | 11 & 12 Geo. 5. c. lxvii | 28 July 1921 |
An Act to confirm certain Provisional Orders made by the Minister of Transport under the General Pier and Harbour Act 1861 (Note: General Pier and Harbour Act 1861 (24 & 25 Vict. c. 45)) relating to Bridport Brighton Fowey and Llanelly.
| | Bridport Harbour Order 1921 Provisional Order for the transfer to the Corporation of Bridport of the undertaking known as Bridport Harbour to confer powers on the Corporation with reference thereto and the maintenance management and improvement thereof to authorise the Corporation to borrow money and for other purposes. | |
| | Brighton Marine Palace and Pier Order 1921 Provisional Order empowering the Brighton Marine Palace and Pier Company to construct a Landing Stage and other Works in the County Borough of Brighton in the County of Sussex to raise Additional Capital and for other purposes. | |
| | Fowey Harbour Order 1921 Provisional Order for the management and improvement of the Harbour of Fowey in the County of Cornwall. | |
| | Llanelly Harbour Order 1921 Provisional Order to increase the tolls and other charges leviable by the Llanelly Harbour Trust and for other purposes. | |
| Ministry of Health Provisional Order Confirmation (Newcastle-under-Lyme Extension) Act 1921 (repealed) | 11 & 12 Geo. 5. c. lxviii | 4 August 1921 |
An Act to confirm a Provisional Order of the Minister of Health relating to Newcastle-under-Lyme Extension. (Repealed by Staffordshire Act 1983 (c. xviii))
| | Newcastle-under-Lyme (Extension) Order 1921 Provisional Order made under the Local Government Act 1888 for extending a Borough. | |
| Ministry of Health Provisional Order Confirmation (Sheffield Extension) Act 1921 (repealed) | 11 & 12 Geo. 5. c. lxix | 4 August 1921 |
An Act to confirm a Provisional Order of the Minister of Health relating to Sheffield. (Repealed by Statute Law (Repeals) Act 1989 (c. 43))
| | Sheffield (Extension) Order 1921 Provisional Order made under the Local Government Act 1888 for the extension of a County Borough. | |
| Ministry of Health Provisional Orders Confirmation (No. 7) Act 1921 | 11 & 12 Geo. 5. c. lxx | 4 August 1921 |
An Act to confirm certain Provisional Orders of the Minister of Health relating to Derby Doncaster Hemel Hempsted Newton in Mackerfield Runcorn Stockport and Swanage.
| | Derby Order 1921 Provisional Order for altering the Derby Corporation Act 1877. (Note: Derby Corporation Act 1877 (40 & 41 Vict. c. cxviii)) | |
| | Doncaster Order 1921 Provisional Order for altering certain Local Acts and Confirming Acts. | |
| | Hemel Hempsted Order 1921 Provisional Order for partially repealing and altering the Hemel Hempsted Corporation Water Act 1900. (Note: Hemel Hempstead Corporation Water Act 1900 (63 & 64 Vict. c. ccliv)) | |
| | Newton in Mackerfield Order 1921 Provisional Order for altering the Newton District Improvement Act 1855. (Note: Newton District Improvement Act 1855 (18 & 19 Vict. c. c)) | |
| | Runcorn Order 1921 Provisional Order for altering the Runcorn Weston and Halton Waterworks Act 1865 (Note: Runcorn Weston and Halton Waterworks Act 1865 (28 & 29 Vict. c. xlvii)) and the Runcorn Commissioners Act 1893. (Note: Runcorn Commissioners Act 1893 (56 & 57 Vict. c. clvi)) | |
| | Stockport Order 1921 Provisional Order for partially repealing altering and amending certain Local Acts and a Provisional Order. | |
| | Swanage Order 1921 Provisional Order for partially repealing altering and amending the Swanage Urban District Water Act 1913. (Note: Swanage Urban District Water Act 1913 (3 & 4 Geo. 5. c. xxxii)) | |
| Pilotage Orders Confirmation (No. 6) Act 1921 (repealed) | 11 & 12 Geo. 5. c. lxxi | 4 August 1921 |
An Act to confirm certain Pilotage Orders made by the Board of Trade under the Pilotage Act 1913 relating to pilotage in the Pilotage Districts of Arundel Berwick and Lancaster. (Repealed by Statute Law (Repeals) Act 1995 (c. 44))
| | Arundel Pilotage Order 1921 Arundel Pilotage Order. | |
| | Berwick Pilotage Order 1921 Berwick Pilotage Order. | |
| | Lancaster Pilotage Order 1921 Lancaster Pilotage Order. | |
| Pilotage Orders Confirmation (No. 7) Act 1921 (repealed) | 11 & 12 Geo. 5. c. lxxii | 4 August 1921 |
An Act to confirm certain Pilotage Orders made by the Board of Trade under the Pilotage Act 1913 relating to pilotage in the Pilotage Districts of Aberdeen Ardrossan Ayr Inverness Montrose and Stonehaven. (Repealed by Statute Law (Repeals) Act 1995 (c. 44))
| | Aberdeen Pilotage Order 1921 Aberdeen Pilotage Order. | |
| | Ardrossan Pilotage Order 1921 Ardrossan Pilotage Order. | |
| | Ayr Pilotage Order 1921 Ayr Pilotage Order. | |
| | Inverness Pilotage Order 1921 Inverness Pilotage Order. | |
| | Montrose Pilotage Order 1921 Montrose Pilotage Order. | |
| | Stonehaven Pilotage Order 1921 Stonehaven Pilotage Order. | |
| St. Helens Corporation Act 1921 (repealed) | 11 & 12 Geo. 5. c. lxxiii | 4 August 1921 |
An Act to empower the Mayor Aldermen and Burgesses of the borough of St, Helens to construct street improvements and to provide and run omnibuses within and without the borough to consolidate the rates of the borough to make further provision with regard to the tramways gas water and electricity undertakings of the Corporation and the health local government and improvement of the borough and for other purposes. (Repealed by County of Merseyside Act 1980 (c. x))
| Liverpool Corporation Act 1921 | 11 & 12 Geo. 5. c. lxxiv | 4 August 1921 |
An Act to Consolidate with Amendments the Local Acts in force within the City of Liverpool; to provide for the Union of the Parishes therein and to Consolidate the Local Rates leviable in the City; to authorise the construction of new Tramways and Street Improvements and to make provision in regard to the various Undertakings of the Corporation; to make better provision for the Health Local Government and Finance of the City; and for other purposes.
| Southend Waterworks Act 1921 | 11 & 12 Geo. 5. c. lxxv | 4 August 1921 |
An Act to increase the rates for the supply of water by the Southend Waterworks Company; and for other purposes.
| Grimsby Corporation Act 1921 (repealed) | 11 & 12 Geo. 5. c. lxxvi | 4 August 1921 |
An Act to empower the Mayor Aldermen and Burgesses of the County Borough of Grimsby to construct and work Tramways and to provide and work Trolley Vehicles; to make Street Works and Improvements; to confer further powers with respect to their Electricity and Markets Undertakings; to make various provisions and to confer various powers in regard to the health and for the improvement and good government of the Borough; and for other purposes (Repealed by Humberside Act 1982 (c. iii))
| London County Council (Money) Act 1921 (repealed) | 11 & 12 Geo. 5. c. lxxvii | 4 August 1921 |
An Act to regulate the expenditure on capital account and lending of money by the London County Council during the financial period from the first day of April one thousand nine hundred and twenty-one to the thirtieth day of September one thousand nine hundred and twenty-two and for other purposes. (Repealed by London County Council (Loans) Act 1955 (4 & 5 Eliz. 2. c. xxvi))
| Lee Conservancy Act 1921 | 11 & 12 Geo. 5. c. lxxviii | 17 August 1921 |
An Act to increase the tolls and charges to be demanded by the Lee Conservancy Board and the sums payable to them by the Metropolitan Water Board to enlarge the powers of the Lee Conservancy Board and for other purposes.
| Southampton Corporation Water Act 1921 | 11 & 12 Geo. 5. c. lxxix | 17 August 1921 |
An Act for empowering the Mayor Aldermen and Burgesses of the borough of Southampton to acquire the undertaking of the South Hants Waterworks Company for equalising the rating of the said borough and for other purposes.
| Thames Conservancy Act 1921 (repealed) | 11 & 12 Geo. 5. c. lxxx | 17 August 1921 |
An Act to amend the enactments relating to the payments to be made to the Conservators of the River Thames for the taking of water by the Metropolitan Water Board and by certain water companies to revise the tolls and charges leviable by the Conservators in respect of merchandise conveyed on and vessels using the said river and for other purposes. (Repealed by Thames Conservancy Act 1924 (14 & 15 Geo. 5. c. lxiv))
| London and North Western Railway (Holyhead Harbour Leasing) Act 1921 | 11 & 12 Geo. 5. c. lxxxi | 17 August 1921 |
An Act to authorise the Lease by the Minister of Transport to the London and North Western Railway Company of certain Lands and Works at Holyhead Harbour.
| Stock Conversion and Investment Trust Limited Act 1921 | 11 & 12 Geo. 5. c. lxxxii | 17 August 1921 |
An Act to alter certain of the provisions of the trust deeds regulating the issue of the preferred and deferred (North Eastern Railway) stock of the Stock Conversion and Investment Trust Limited to confer further powers on the Stock Conversion and Investment Trust Limited and upon the Railway Investment Company Limited and upon certain trustees of the Railway Investment Company Limited and for other purposes.
| Rhymney Valley Water Act 1921 | 11 & 12 Geo. 5. c. lxxxiii | 17 August 1921 |
An Act to constitute a Water Board for the Rhymney Valley with Power to acquire certain to Water Undertakings and Works; construct New Works and to supply Water; and for other purposes.
| South Essex Waterworks Act 1921 | 11 & 12 Geo. 5. c. lxxxiv | 17 August 1921 |
An Act to confer further powers on the South Essex Waterworks Company to extend their limits of supply and for other purposes.
| Hastings Tramways Act 1921 (repealed) | 11 & 12 Geo. 5. c. lxxxv | 17 August 1921 |
An Act to empower the Hasting Tramways Company to construct extension tramways in the county borough of Hastings and for other purposes. (Repealed by Hastings Tramways Act 1957 (5 & 6 Eliz. 2. c. xxxvi))
| Rotherham Corporation Act 1921 (repealed) | 11 & 12 Geo. 5. c. lxxxvi | 17 August 1921 |
An Act to confer further powers upon the mayor aldermen and burgesses of the county borough of Rotherham to make further provision with regard to the health local government and improvement of the borough to authorise the formation of a superannuation fund to provide for the consolidation of rates levied in the said borough and for other purposes. (Repealed by Statute Law (Repeals) Act 1989 (c. 43))
| Coventry Corporation Act 1921 | 11 & 12 Geo. 5. c. lxxxvii | 17 August 1921 |
An Act to make provision for the transfer of the undertaking of the North Warwickshire Water Company to the mayor aldermen and citizens of the city of Coventry to establish a fund for granting superannuation allowances to officers and servants of the Corporation and for other purposes.
| Lancashire County Council (Drainage) Act 1921 (repealed) | 11 & 12 Geo. 5. c. lxxxviii | 17 August 1921 |
An Act to constitute the Lancashire County Council the drainage authority for the administrative county palatine of Lancaster. (Repealed by Land Drainage (Amendment) Act 1976 (c. 17))
| Taf Fechan Water Supply Act 1921 | 11 & 12 Geo. 5. c. lxxxix | 17 August 1921 |
An Act to constitute a Water Supply Board for the Taf Fechan watershed; to transfer to the Board certain waterworks and powers of the Merthyr Tydfil Corporation; to authorise the Board to complete and maintain works and to supply water; and for other purposes.
| Slough Trading Company Limited (Canal) Act 1921 | 11 & 12 Geo. 5. c. xc | 17 August 1921 |
An Act to authorise the Slough Trading Company Limited to construct a branch canal near Slough in the county of Buckingham for the conveyance of traffic between their works and the Grand Junction Canal; and for other purposes.
| Nuneaton Corporation Act 1921 | 11 & 12 Geo. 5. c. xci | 17 August 1921 |
An Act to confirm an agreement between the corporation of Nuneaton and the corporation of Leicester with reference to the supply of water in bul to empower the corporation of Nuneaton to construction additional waterworks to consolidate the rates of the borough and to confer further powers upon the corporation with reference to the health local government and improvement of the borough and for other purposes.
| Burnley Corporation Act 1921 | 11 & 12 Geo. 5. c. xcii | 17 August 1921 |
An Act to authorise the Corporation of Burnley to construct a street improvement and additional waterworks; to extend the time for the construction of certain waterworks authorised by the Burnley Corporation Act 1908; (Note: Burnley Corporation Act 1908 (8 Edw. 7. c. lxxxix)) to make further provision with regard to the omnibus tramways water and markets undertakings of the Corporation and the health local government and improvement of the borough and for other purposes.
| Wigan Corporation Act 1921 | 11 & 12 Geo. 5. c. xciii | 17 August 1921 |
An Act to empower the Mayor Aldermen and Burgesses of the borough of Wigan to construct tramways and a public slaughter-house to provide and work omnibuses and to acquire lands for street improvements to make further provision in regard to the gas water electricity markets baths and other undertakings of the Corporation and the health local government and improvement of the borough to confer powers upon the Corporation in regard to the prevention of flooding to consolidate the rates of the borough and for other purposes.
| Metropolitan Water Board (Charges) Act 1921 | 11 & 12 Geo. 5. c. xciv | 17 August 1921 |
An Act to amend the powers of the Metropolitan Water Board of charging for water supplied by them and for other purposes.
| Zion Congregational Chapel (Frampton Cotterell) Scheme Confirmation Act 1921 | 11 & 12 Geo. 5. c. xcv | 17 August 1921 |
An Act to confirm a scheme of the Charity Commissioners for the application or management of the charity consisting of the Congregational chapel Sunday school burial ground and trust property in the parish of Frampton Cotterell in the county of Gloucester.
| | Scheme for the application or management of the charity consisting of the Congregational chapel Sunday school burial ground and trust property in the parish of Frampton Cotterell in the county of Gloucester comprised in indentures dated 10th December 1794 and 6th May 1872 or one of them. | |
| Ministry of Health Provisional Orders Confirmation (Ossett and Wakefield Extension) Act 1921 (repealed) | 11 & 12 Geo. 5. c. xcvi | 17 August 1921 |
An Act to confirm certain Provisional Orders of the Minister of Health relating to Ossett and Wakefield. (Repealed by West Yorkshire Act 1980 (c. xiv))
| | Ossett (Extension) Order 1921 Provisional Order made in pursuance of the Local Government Act 1888 for the extension of a Borough. | |
| | Wakefield (Extension) Order 1921 Provisional Order made in pursuance of the Local Government Act 1888 for the extension of a County Borough. | |
| Ministry of Health Provisional Orders Confirmation (No. 8) Act 1921 | 11 & 12 Geo. 5. c. xcvii | 17 August 1921 |
An Act to confirm certain Provisional Orders of the Minister of Health relating to Carmarthen Kingston-upon-Hull Llandudno Melton Mowbray Morecambe Scarborough Southport Widnes and the Shoreham and Lancing Sea Defence District.
| | Carmarthen Order 1921 Provisional Order for partially repealing and altering the Local Act 6 Vict. c. XII. (Note: Carmarthen Markets Act 1843 (6 & 7 Vict. c. xii))) the Carmarthen Cattle Market Act 1853 (Note: Carmarthen Cattle Market Act 1853 (16 & 17 Vict. c. ix)) and the Carmarthen Improvement Act 1898. (Note: Carmarthen Improvement Act 1898 (61 & 62 Vict. c. cviii)) | |
| | Kingston-upon-Hull Order 1921 Provisional Order for partially repealing altering and amending the Kingston-upon-Hull Corporation Act 1906. (Note: Kingston-upon-Hull Corporation Act 1906 (6 Edw. 7. c. clxxxix)) | |
| | Llandudno Order 1921 Provisional Order for altering the Llandudno Improvement Act 1854 (Note: Llandudno Improvement Act 1854 (17 & 18 Vict. c. cii)) and the Local Government Board's Provisional Orders Confirmation (No. 5) Act 1899. (Note: Local Government Board's Provisional Orders Confirmation (No. 5) Act 1899 (62 & 63 Vict. c. cx)) | |
| | Melton Mowbray Order 1921 Provisional Order for altering the Melton Mowbray Cattle Market &c. Act 1869 (Note: Melton Mowbray Cattle Market, &c. Act 1869 (32 & 33 Vict. c. xxvii)) and a Confirming Act. (Note: Local Government Board's Provisional Orders Confirmation (No. 11) Act 1907 (7 Edw. 7. c. clxi)) | |
| | Morecambe Order 1921 Provisional Order for repealing altering and amending the Lancaster Local Board of Health Act 1864 (Note: Lancaster Local Board of Health Act 1864 (27 & 28 Vict. c. cviii)) and the Lancaster Corporation Act 1918. (Note: Lancaster Corporation Act 1918 (8 & 9 Geo. 5. c. lx)) | |
| | Scarborough Order 1921 Provisional Order for partially repealing altering and amending the Scarborough Improvement Act 1889 (Note: Scarborough Improvement Act 1889 (52 & 53 Vict. c. clxiv)) the Scarborough Corporation Act 1900 (Note: Scarborough Corporation Act 1900 (63 & 64 Vict. c. cclxxix)) and the Local Government Board's Provisional Orders Confirmation (No. 2) Act 1915. (Note: Local Government Board's Provisional Orders Confirmation (No. 2) Act 1915 (5 & 6 Geo. 5. c. xxxiv)) | |
| | Southport Order 1921 Provisional Order for partially repealing altering and amending certain Local Acts. | |
| | Widnes Order 1921 Provisional Order for altering the Widnes and Runcorn Bridge Act 1900 (Note: Widnes and Runcorn Bridge Act 1900 (63 & 64 Vict. c. lxxxvi)) and the Widnes and Runcorn Bridge (Transfer) Act 1911. (Note: Widnes and Runcorn Bridge (Transfer) Act 1911 (1 & 2 Geo. 5. c. lxv)) | |
| | Shoreham and Lancing Sea Defence Order 1921 Provisional Order for partially repealing and altering a Local Act (Note: Worthing and Lancing Turnpike Road and Sea Defences Act 1826 (7 Geo. 4. c. x)) and certain Confirming Acts. | |
| Peterhead Harbours Order Confirmation Act 1921 (repealed) | 11 & 12 Geo. 5. c. xcviii | 17 August 1921 |
An Act to confirm a Provisional Order under the Private Legislation Procedure (Scotland) Act 1899 relating to Peterhead Harbours. (Repealed by Peterhead Harbours Order Confirmation Act 1992 (c. xii))
| | Peterhead Harbours Order 1921 Provisional Order to authorise the Trustees of the harbours of Peterhead to construct new and additional works to borrow money to amend the Peterhead Harbour Acts to confer further powers on the Trustees and for other purposes. | |
| Provisional Order (City of Manchester Police and Fire Brigade Pension Funds) Confirmation Act 1921 | 11 & 12 Geo. 5. c. xcix | 17 August 1921 |
An Act to confirm a Provisional Order under section eight of the Police Act 1893 (Note: Police Act 1893 (56 & 57 Vict. c. 10)) uniting the Police and Fire Brigade Pension Funds of the City of Manchester.
| | City of Manchester Police and Fire Brigade Pension Funds Order 1921 Provisional Order made in pursuance of Section Eight the Police Act 1893. | |
| Pier and Harbours Orders Confirmation (No. 1) Act 1921 | 11 & 12 Geo. 5. c. c | 17 August 1921 |
An Act to confirm certain Provisional Orders made by the Minister of Transport under the General Pier and Harbour Act 1861 relating to Brixham Cowes Great Yarmouth Limerick and Morecambe.
| | Brixham Harbour Order 1921 Provisional Order to increase the rates and charges leviable at the Harbour of Brixham and for other purposes. | |
| | Cowes Urban District Council Order 1921 Provisional Order to alter the rates and charges leviable at the wharf or landing place at Cowes authorised by the Act 56 Geo. III. Cap. XXV. (Note: Cowes Improvement and Market Act 1816 (56 Geo. 3. c. xxv)) and the Provisional Order relating to West Cowes confirmed by the Local Government Supplemental Act 1867 (No. 2) (Note: Local Government Supplemental Act 1867 (No. 2) (30 & 31 Vict. c. 65)) to empower the Cowes Urban District Council to acquire lands for the purposes of an additional wharf or landing-place and for other purposes. | |
| | Great Yarmouth Wellington Pier Order 1921 Provisional Order for increasing the rates authorised by the Great Yarmouth Wellington Pier Order 1901. | |
| | Limerick Harbour Order 1921 Provisional Order for increasing the dues rates and charges leviable by the Limerick Harbour Commissioners and for other purposes. | |
| | Morecambe Central Pier Order 1921 Provisional Order for varying certain rates chargeable in respect of the use of the Morecambe Central Pier and for other purposes. | |
| | Morecambe (West End) Pier Order 1921 Provisional Order for increasing the tolls rates and charges levied in respect of the use of Morecambe (West End) Pier. | |
| Glasgow University (Dundonald Bursaries) Order Confirmation Act 1921 | 11 & 12 Geo. 5. c. ci | 17 August 1921 |
An Act to confirm a Provisional Order under the Private Legislation Procedure (Scotland) Act 1899 relating to Glasgow University.
| | Glasgow University (Dundonald Bursaries) Order 1921 Provisional Order to authorise the University Court of the University of Glasgow to sell the College Milton Estate in the Parish of East Kilbride in the County of Lanark vested in them for the purposes of the Foundation known as the Dundonald Bursaries; and for other purposes. | |
| Ministry of Health Provisional Order Confirmation (Barnsley Extension) Act 1921 (repealed) | 11 & 12 Geo. 5. c. cii | 19 August 1921 |
An Act to confirm a Provisional Order of the Minister of Health relating to Barnsley. (Repealed by Statute Law (Repeals) Act 1989 (c. 43))
| | Barnsley (Extension) Order 1921 Provisional Order made in pursuance of the Local Government Act 1888 for extending a County Borough. | |
| Ministry of Health Provisional Order Confirmation (Stoke-on-Trent Extension) Act 1921 | 11 & 12 Geo. 5. c. ciii | 19 August 1921 |
An Act to confirm a Provisional Order of the Minister of Health relating to Stoke-on-Trent.
| | Stoke-on-Trent Extension Order 1921 Provisional Order made in pursuance of the Local Government Act 1888 for extending a County Borough. | |
| Ministry of Health Provisional Orders Confirmation (Aberavon and Neath Extension) Act 1921 (repealed) | 11 & 12 Geo. 5. c. civ | 19 August 1921 |
An Act to confirm certain Provisional Orders of the Minister of Health relating to Aberavon and Neath. (Repealed by West Glamorgan Act 1987 (c. viii))
| | Port Talbot (Extension) Order 1921 Provisional Order made in pursuance of the Local Government Act 1888 for the extension of a Borough. | |
| | Neath (Extension) Order 1921 Provisional Order made in pursuance of the Local Government Act 1888 for the extension of a Borough. | |
| Bridge of Allan Water, &c. Order Confirmation Act 1921 | 11 & 12 Geo. 5. c. cv | 19 August 1921 |
An Act to confirm a Provisional Order under the Private Legislation Procedure (Scotland) Act 1899 relating to Bridge of Allan Water &c.
| | Bridge of Allan Water, &c. Order 1921 Provisional Order to authorise the Provost Magistrates and Councillors of the Burgh of Bridge of Allan to make and maintain additional waterworks; to acquire maintain improve develop and carry on the mineral waters and baths undertaking of the Bridge of Allan Mineral Wells Company Limited; and for other purposes. | |
| Aberdeen Corporation (Electricity, Works, Railway) Order Confirmation Act 1921 (repealed) | 11 & 12 Geo. 5. c. cvi | 19 August 1921 |
An Act to confirm a Provisional Order under the Private Legislation Procedure (Scotland) Act 1899 relating to Aberdeen Corporation (Electricity Works Railway). (Repealed by North of Scotland Electricity Order Confirmation Act 1958 (7 & 8 Eliz. 2. c. ii))
| | Aberdeen Corporation (Electricity Works Railway) Order 1921 Provisional Order to authorise the Corporation of the City of Aberdeen to make a Railway from the Caledonian Railway to the Corporation Electricity Works to use certain Lands for an Electrical Generating Station and for storing Coal and for other purposes. | |
| Stirlingshire and Falkirk Water Order Confirmation Act 1921 | 11 & 12 Geo. 5. c. cvii | 19 August 1921 |
An Act to confirm a Provisional Order under the Private Legislation Procedure (Scotland) Act 1899 relating to Stirlingshire and Falkirk Water.
| | Stirlingshire and Falkirk Water Order 1921 Provisional Order to constitute and incorporate a Board for the supply of water to the Eastern District and parts of the Central District of the County of Stirling and to the Burgh of Falkirk; to transfer to the Board the water undertakings of the County Council and the Eastern District Committee of the County of Stirling constituted by the East Stirlingshire Water Act 1900 (Note: East Stirlingshire Water Act 1900 (63 & 64 Vict. c. xciii)) and the undertaking of the Falkirk and Larbert Water Trustees; to dissolve the Falkirk and Larbert Water Trustees; to authorise the Board to construct additional waterworks; to confer other powers on the Board; and for other purposes. | |
| North British Railway (Burntisland Harbour Transfer) Order Confirmation Act 1921 (repealed) | 11 & 12 Geo. 5. c. cviii | 19 August 1921 |
An Act to confirm a Provisional Order under the Private Legislation Procedure (Scotland) Act 1899 relating to the North British Railway (Burntisland Harbour Transfer). (Repealed by Forth Ports Authority Order Confirmation Act 1969 (c. xxxiv))
| | North British Railway (Burntisland Harbour Transfer) Order 1921 Provisional Order to transfer to and vest in the North British Railway Company the undertaking of the Burntisland Harbour Commissioners and for other purposes. | |
| Dumbarton Burgh (Water) Order Confirmation Act 1921 | 11 & 12 Geo. 5. c. cix | 19 August 1921 |
An Act to confirm a Provisional Order under the Private Legislation Procedure (Scotland) Act 1899 relating to Dumbarton Burgh (Water).
| | Dumbarton Burgh (Water) Order 1921 Provisional Order to extend the time for the completion of the works authorised by the Dumbarton Burgh (Water &c.) Order 1914 to authorise the provost magistrates and councillors of the burgh of Dumbarton to borrow additional money and for other purposes. | |
| Airdrie and Coatbridge Tramways Trust Order Confirmation Act 1921 | 11 & 12 Geo. 5. c. cx | 19 August 1921 |
An Act to confirm a Provisional Order under the Private Legislation Procedure (Scotland) Act 1899 relating to the Airdrie and Coatbridge Tramways Trust.
| | Airdrie and Coatbridge Tramways Trust Order 1921 Provisional Order to constitute and incorporate a Tramway Trust for the burghs of Coatbridge and Airdrie and to transfer to and vest in such trust the under taking of the Airdrie and Coatbridge Tramways Company and for other purposes. | |
| Grangemouth and Stirling Water Order Confirmation Act 1921 | 11 & 12 Geo. 5. c. cxi | 19 August 1921 |
An Act to confirm a Provisional Order under the Private Legislation Procedure (Scotland) Act 1899 relating to
| | Grangemouth and Stirling Water Order 1921 Provisional Order to transfer to and vest in the Town Council of Grangemouth and the Stirling Waterworks Commissioners a portion of the waterworks of the said Town Council to provide for the use and management of the works and for the water supply from the same to authorise the Stirling Waterworks Commissioners to make and maintain additional works to acquire additional lands to borrow money and for other purposes. | |
| Pilotage Orders Confirmation (No. 5) Act 1921 (repealed) | 11 & 12 Geo. 5. c. cxii | 19 August 1921 |
An Act to confirm certain Pilotage Orders made by the Board of Trade under the Pilotage Act 1913 relating to pilotage in the Pilotage Districts of Barry Bristol Cardiff Gloucester Llanelly Newport Port Talbot and Swansea. (Repealed by Statute Law (Repeals) Act 1995 (c. 44))
| | Barry Pilotage Order 1921 Barry Pilotage Order. | |
| | Bristol Pilotage Order 1921 Bristol Pilotage Order. | |
| | Cardiff Pilotage Order 1921 Cardiff Pilotage Order. | |
| | Gloucester Pilotage Order 1921 Gloucester Pilotage Order. | |
| | Llanelly Pilotage Order 1921 Llanelly Pilotage Order. | |
| | Newport Pilotage Order 1921 Newport Pilotage Order. | |
| | Port Talbot Pilotage Order 1921 Port Talbot Pilotage Order. | |
| | Swansea Pilotage Order 1921 Swansea Pilotage Order. | |
| Batley Corporation Act 1921 | 11 & 12 Geo. 5. c. cxiii | 19 August 1921 |
An Act to empower the Mayor Aldermen and Burgesses of the Borough of Batley to construct additional Waterworks; to make further provision in regard to their Water Gas and Electricity Undertakings; to make further provision for the improvement health and good government of the Borough; and for other purposes.
| County of London Electric Supply Company's Act 1921 | 11 & 12 Geo. 5. c. cxiv | 19 August 1921 |
An Act to extend the powers of the County of London Electric Supply Company Limited with reference to the user of certain lands and the payment of interest out of capital; and for other purposes.
| Metropolitan Water Board (Various Powers) Act 1921 | 11 & 12 Geo. 5. c. cxv | 19 August 1921 |
An Act to empower the Metropolitan Water Board to make Waterworks and to acquire Lands; and for other purposes.
| Leicester Corporation Act 1921 | 11 & 12 Geo. 5. c. cxvi | 19 August 1921 |
An Act to confer further powers upon the Mayor Aldermen and Citizens of the City of Leicester with reference to their Gas Water and Markets Undertakings; and for other purposes.
| North Staffordshire Railway Act 1921 | 11 & 12 Geo. 5. c. cxvii | 19 August 1921 |
An Act to confer further powers upon the North Staffordshire Railway Company.
| South Shields Corporation Act 1921 | 11 & 12 Geo. 5. c. cxviii | 19 August 1921 |
An Act to define and extend the boundaries the borough and parish of South Shields and to alter certain wards of the borough and parish to authorise the Corporation of the borough to provide and work omnibuses and to confer upon them further them further powers with respect to their tramway and electricity undertakings to consolidate the local rates leviable in the borough and parish to increase the tolls to be taken for the markets and fairs to authorise a certain street improvement and the purchase of lands and to make better provisions for the health local government and finance of the borough and for other purposes.
| Manchester Corporation (General Powers) Act 1921 | 11 & 12 Geo. 5. c. cxix | 19 August 1921 |
An Act to empower the Lord Mayor Aldermen and Citizens of the city of Manchester to con struct additional gasworks and to acquire the Stretford Gas Company's undertaking to make further provision in regard to the health local government and improvement of the city and for other purposes.
| West Ham Corporation Act 1921 | 11 & 12 Geo. 5. c. cxx | 19 August 1921 |
An Act to increase the number of councillors and aldermen of the county borough of West Ham and to alter the wards of the borough and for other purposes.
| Rhymney and Aber Valleys Gas and Water Act 1921 | 11 & 12 Geo. 5. c. cxxi | 19 August 1921 |
An Act for conferring further powers upon the Rhymney and Aber Valleys Gas and Water Company and for other purposes.
| Edinburgh Corporation Order Confirmation Act 1921 (repealed) | 11 & 12 Geo. 5. c. cxxii | 8 November 1921 |
An Act to confirm a Provisional Order under the Private Legislation Procedure (Scotland) Act 1899 relating to Edinburgh Corporation. (Repealed by Edinburgh Corporation Order Confirmation Act 1933 (24 & 25 Geo. 5. c. v))
| | Edinburgh Corporation Order 1921 Provisional Order to authorise the Corporation of the city and royal burgh of Edinburgh to widen roads and acquire lands to confer further powers with respect to the financial administration of the under takings of the Corporation to authorise the creation and issue of additional Corporation stock to provide for the redemption and cancellation of water annuities to borrow money to amend Acts and for other purposes. | |
| East Lothian County Buildings Order Confirmation Act 1921 | 11 & 12 Geo. 5. c. cxxiii | 8 November 1921 |
An Act to confirm a Provisional Order under the Private Legislation Procedure (Scotland) Act 1899 relating to East Lothian County Buildings.
| | East Lothian County Buildings Order 1921 | |
| Dorward's House of Refuge (Montrose) Order Confirmation Act 1921 | 11 & 12 Geo. 5. c. cxxiv | 8 November 1921 |
An Act to confirm a Provisional Order under the Private Legislation Procedure (Scotland) Act 1899 relating to Dorward's House of Refuge (Montrose).
| | Dorward's House of Refuge (Montrose) Order 1921 Provisional Order for terminating the existing Board of Managers of Dorward's House of Refuge for the Destitute in Montrose for constituting and incorporating a new Board of Managers for transferring the rights and powers of the existing body to the new Board for regulating the appointment and retiral of members of the Board for modifying the provisions of the Deed of Constitution and the Act of Incorporation (Note: Dorward's House of Refuge for the Destitute Act 1851 (14 & 15 Vict. c. 17 Pr.)) for enlarging and defining the scope of the charity and the powers and duties of the Board of Managers and for regulating the discharge of inmates who may cease or have ceased to be proper objects of the charity and for other purposes. | |
| Church of Scotland (General Trustees) Order Confirmation Act 1921 | 11 & 12 Geo. 5. c. cxxv | 8 November 1921 |
An Act to confirm a Provisional Order under the Private Legislation Procedure (Scotland) Act 1899 relating to the Church of Scotland (General Trustees).
| | Church of Scotland (General Trustees) Order 1921 Provisional Order to incorporate the Church of Scotland (General Trustees) to vest in the corporation the heritable properties and investments held by the different sets of trustees on behalf of the committees of the General Assembly of the Church of Scotland and for other purposes. | |
| Oban Burgh Order Confirmation Act 1921 | 11 & 12 Geo. 5. c. cxxvi | 8 November 1921 |
An Act to confirm a Provisional Order under the Private Legislation Procedure (Scotland) Act 1899 relating to Oban Burgh.
| | Oban Burgh Order 1921 Provisional Order to repeal the provisions of section 61 of the Oban Burgh Act 1881 (Note: Oban Burgh Act 1881 (44 & 45 Vict. c. clxxviii)) with respect to payments to the county council of the county of Argyll for the Lorn District Committee of that county council to increase the public health general assessment to authorise the provost magistrates and councillors of the burgh of Oban to levy dues at the north and south Piers of Oban and for other purposes. | |
| Greenock Corporation Order Confirmation Act 1921 | 11 & 12 Geo. 5. c. cxxvii | 8 November 1921 |
An Act to confirm a Provisional Order under the Private Legislation Procedure (Scotland) Act 1899 relating to Greenock Corporation.
| | Greenock Corporation Order 1921 Provisional Order to confer further powers on the Corporation of Greenock in relation to their water undertaking to increase the burgh general assessment and public health general assessment and for other purposes. | |
| Perth Corporation (Waterworks, &c.) Order Confirmation Act 1921 | 11 & 12 Geo. 5. c. cxxviii | 10 November 1921 |
An Act to confirm a Provisional Order under the Private Legislation Procedure (Scotland) Act 1899 relating to Perth Corporation (Waterworks &c.).
| | Perth Corporation (Waterworks, &c.) Order 1921 Provisional Order to authorise the construction of additional waterworks for the city and royal burgh of Perth for conferring further borrowing powers for the purposes of the water gas tramways and other undertakings of the said city and royal burgh and for other purposes. | |
| Dundee Corporation Order Confirmation Act 1921 (repealed) | 11 & 12 Geo. 5. c. cxxix | 10 November 1921 |
An Act to confirm a Provisional Order under the Private Legislation Procedure (Scotland) Act 1899 relating to Dundee Corporation. (Repealed by Dundee Corporation (Consolidated Powers) Order Confirmation Act 1957 (6 & 7 Eliz. 2. c. iv))
| | Dundee Corporation Order 1921 Provisional Order for widening Broughty Ferry Road and the construction of a sea wall or bulwark and a new road or street and for other purposes. | |

=== Private and personal acts ===
| Short title | Citation | Royal assent |
Long title
| Wolverton Estate Act 1921 | 11 & 12 Geo. 5. c. 1 Pr. | 4 August 1921 |
An Act to confer upon Frederic Lord Wolverton and the Trustees of the property settled by an indenture of settlement dated the thirty-first day of December one thousand eight hundred and eighty-eight powers to make certain limited dispositions of the income and capital of part of the settled property for the benefit of Lord Wolverton's family and to raise certain moneys and for other purposes.
| De Trafford Estate Act 1921 | 11 & 12 Geo. 5. c. 2 Pr. | 17 August 1921 |
An Act to confirm a conditional agreement between the Trustees of the will of the late Sir Humphrey de Trafford Baronet and the Manchester Ship Canal Company for the sale of lands forming part of the De Trafford Estates in the county of Lancaster on the terms therein appearing.

=== Sources ===
- The Public General Statutes Passed in the Eleventh and Twelfth Years of the Reign of His Majesty King George the Fifth. 1921. Vol. 59. London: The Council of Law Reporting. 1922 – via Google Books.
- Local and Personal Acts – via Google Books.
- Local and Personal Acts – via Google Books.
- Local and Personal Acts – via Google Books.
- Local and Personal Acts – via Google Books.
- Local and Personal Acts – via Google Books.
- Local and Personal Acts – via Google Books.

== See also ==
- List of acts of the Parliament of the United Kingdom
