= Public inquiry =

Official review of events or actions ordered by a government body

A public inquiry, also known as a tribunal of inquiry, government inquiry, or simply inquiry, is an official review of events or actions ordered by a government body, often by a parliamentary inquiry committee. In many common law countries, such as the United Kingdom, Ireland, Australia, and Canada, such an inquiry differs from a royal commission in that a public inquiry accepts evidence and conducts its hearings in a more public forum and focuses on a more specific occurrence. Interested members of the public and organisations may make (written) evidential submissions, as is the case with most inquiries, and also listen to oral evidence given by other parties.

== General description ==
Typical events for a public inquiry are those that cause multiple deaths, such as public transport crashes or mass murders.

Advocacy groups and opposition political parties are likely to ask for public inquiries for all manner of issues. The government of the day typically only accedes to a fraction of these requests. The political decision whether to appoint a public inquiry into an event was found to be dependent on several factors. The first is the extent of media coverage of the event; those that receive more media interest are more likely to be inquired. Second, since the appointment of a public inquiry is typically made by government ministers, events that involve allegations of blame on the part of the relevant minister are less likely to be investigated by a public inquiry. Third, a public inquiry generally takes longer to report and costs more on account of its public nature. When a government refuses a public inquiry on some topic, it is usually on at least one of these grounds.

The conclusions of the inquiry are delivered in the form of a written report, given first to the government, and soon after made public. Reports usually make recommendations to improve the quality of government or management of public organisations in the future. A 2016 study found that the reports of public inquiries are not effective in changing public opinion regarding the event in question. Empirical studies do not find support for the claim that appointing a public inquiry leads to a decline in media attention to the inquired issue. Public inquiry reports appear to enjoy public trust only when they are critical of a government, and tend to lose credibility when they find no fault on the part of the government.

== France ==
In France, any major project which requires the compulsory acquisition of private property must, before being approved, be the subject of a public inquiry (usually by the prefect of the region or department in which the project will take place); the favourable outcome of such an inquiry is a déclaration d'utilité publique, a formal finding that the project will produce public benefit. This procedure was established by the law on expropriation enacted on 7 July 1833, which extended an earlier law enacted in 1810.

== Ireland ==
In Ireland, there are several kinds of public inquiry. A Tribunal of Inquiry, often simply called a tribunal, is a powerful type of statutory inquiry whose procedures are governed by the Tribunals of Inquiry (Evidence) Act 1921 as amended. An Oireachtas inquiry is a less powerful non-statutory inquiry controlled directly by the Oireachtas (parliament). A 2013 proposal to strengthen the power of Oireachtas inquiries was defeated at a referendum. The Law Reform Commission published a report in 2005 examining the operation of public inquiries and recommending changes. A commission of investigation is a different form of inquiry, with evidence generally given in private; provided by the Commissions of Investigation Act 2004 to address scandals relating to medical care and child abuse.

== South Africa ==
A number of historically important public inquiries have taken place in South Africa since the advent of full democracy in 1994. A number of which have looked into national scale events such as systematic human rights abuses during apartheid or wide scale corruption.

== United Kingdom ==
In the United Kingdom, the term public inquiry, also known as a tribunal of inquiry, refers to either statutory or non-statutory inquiries that have been established either previously by the monarch or by government ministers of the United Kingdom, Scottish, Northern Irish and Welsh governments to investigate either specific, controversial events or policy proposals. Non-statutory public inquiries are often used in order to investigate controversial events of national concern, the advantage being that they are more flexible than the statutory inquiry as they do not need to follow the requirements of the Inquiries Act 2005, The Inquiry Rules 2006 (UK, excluding Scotland) and The Inquiries (Scotland) Rules 2007. Statutory inquiries can be held as subject-specific public inquiries, however most are now held under the Inquiries Act 2005 which repealed the Tribunals of Inquiry (Evidence) Act 1921. Statutory public inquiries, unlike non-statutory inquiries, have legal powers to compel witnesses. This list excludes Public Local Inquiries (which encompasses Planning Inquiries, Compulsory Purchase Order Inquiries, Listed Building Inquiries etc.)

Only United Kingdom government ministers can establish public inquiries, set their terms of reference, and appoint the chair. The UK Government considers that the main purpose of public inquiries is in "preventing recurrence". Between 1990 and 2017 UK governments spent at least £630m on public inquiries, with most expensive being the Bloody Sunday Inquiry costing £210.6 million. Most public inquiries take about two years to complete their work. Of the 69 inquiries launched between 1990 and 2017, the Hammond Inquiry into ministerial conduct relating to the Hinduja affair in 2001 was the shortest, taking just 45 days to report its findings; the Inquiry into Hyponatraemia-related Deaths in Northern Ireland was the longest, taking 13 years and three months.

In September 2024 the House of Lords Statutory Inquiries Committee called for a change in the way public inquiries are set up and conducted. In their report, Public Inquiries: Enhancing Public Trust, it called for "significant improvements to the inquiry system, to make them more efficient and effective and to avoid the costly and wasteful process of inquiries 'reinventing the wheel'". The report recommended:

- A timescale for inquiries, to avoid unnecessary and excessive costs
- A newly created Parliamentary Public Inquiries Committee to monitor and report on the steps being taken to implement inquiry recommendations
- A publicly-accessible online tracker showing how, and when, inquiry recommendations have been put in place
- More inquiries could be led by an expert, or panel of experts, rather than reliance on a judge – and more consideration be given to making some of them non-statutory
- The Inquiries Unit of the Cabinet Office be strengthened to ensure "best practice" is shared between inquiries, including on how best to involve victims and survivors
- Lengthy public inquiries produce interim reports, and others provide regular public updates
- Victims and survivors should be consulted where appropriate on an inquiry's scope.

== Hong Kong ==
In Hong Kong, the Commissions of Inquiry Ordinance was enacted for establishing such a commission. The commission established after the 2012 Lamma Island ferry collision produced a report of its findings which they made public; an internal report was kept confidential. In the 2019–20 Hong Kong protests, one of the five key demands of the protesters, was establishing another commission for the protests itself.

== See also ==
- Inquest, a similar investigation with lesser scope
- Inquiries Act 2005 (UK statute which provides for the holding of inquiries)
- Parliamentary inquiry committee
- Royal Commission
- Tribunal
