= Inquiries Act 2005 =

Act of the Parliament of the United Kingdom

Inquiries Act 2005 (Note: Section 53.)
- Act of Parliament
- Parliament of the United Kingdom
- Long title: An Act to make provision about the holding of inquiries.
- Citation: 2005 c. 12
- Territorial extent: United Kingdom (Note: Section 52.)

Dates
- Royal assent: 7 April 2005
- Commencement: 7 June 2005 (Note: Section 51. The Inquiries Act 2005 (Commencement) Order 2005 (SI 2005/1432).)
Other legislation
Amends	Transport Act 1962; Courts and Legal Services Act 1990; Police Act 1996; Education Act 1996
Repeals/revokes	Tribunals of Inquiry (Evidence) Act 1921
Amended by	Government of Wales Act 2006; Northern Ireland (Miscellaneous Provisions) Act 2006; Safeguarding Vulnerable Groups Act 2006; Investigatory Powers Act 2016

Status: Amended

Text of statute as originally enacted

Revised text of statute as amended

The Inquiries Act 2005 (c. 12) is an act of the Parliament of the United Kingdom. According to the explanatory notes, published by the Department for Constitutional Affairs, the act "is intended to provide a comprehensive statutory framework for inquiries set up by Ministers to look into matters of public concern".

The act repealed the entirety of the Tribunals of Inquiry (Evidence) Act 1921 (11 & 12 Geo. 5. c. 7), a much shorter bill that also empowered Ministers to set up so-called statutory inquiries.

The act was motivated in part by the spiralling costs of the Bloody Sunday Inquiry and a desire to control the length and cost of future inquiries. The act has been criticised by a number of groups and individuals, generally concerned with the power ministers have over the remit of the inquiry and the publication of its final report.

== Criticisms ==
The Parliament of the United Kingdom's Joint Committee on Human Rights has voiced concerns about certain aspects of the Act, as have the Law Society of England and Wales.

Amnesty International has asked members of the British judiciary not to serve on any inquiry held under the Act, as they contend that "any inquiry would be controlled by the executive which is empowered to block public scrutiny of state actions".

The family of Pat Finucane, a solicitor killed by loyalist paramilitaries in Belfast in suspicious circumstances, announced they would not be co-operating with a forthcoming inquiry into the events surrounding his death if it was held under the terms of the Act.

The Canadian judge Peter Cory, who was commissioned by the British and Irish governments to investigate the possibility of state collusion in six high-profile murders, is also a critic. He recommended public inquiries into four of the killings, but has strongly condemned the legislation that quickly followed. In a letter read at a hearing of the United States House Foreign Affairs Subcommittee on Africa, Global Human Rights and International Operations Subcommittee while the legislation was pending, Cory stated:

it seems to me that the proposed new Act would make a meaningful inquiry impossible. The Commissions would be working in an impossible situation. For example, the Minister, the actions of whose ministry was to be reviewed by the public inquiry would have the authority to thwart the efforts of the inquiry at every step. It really creates an intolerable Alice in Wonderland situation. There have been references in the press to an international judicial membership in the inquiry. If the new Act were to become law, I would advise all Canadian judges to decline an appointment in light of the impossible situation they would be facing. In fact, I cannot contemplate any self-respecting Canadian judge accepting an appointment to an inquiry constituted under the new proposed Act.

The chairman of the hearing, Representative Chris Smith, declared that "the bill pending before the British Parliament should be named the 'Public Inquiries Cover-up Bill'."

Indeed, the act repealed the entirety of the Tribunals of Inquiry (Evidence) Act 1921 which had allowed Parliament to vote on a resolution establishing a tribunal that had "all such powers, rights, and privileges as are vested in the High Court" and placed the power solely under the control of a Minister.

== Notable inquiries ==
As of November 2021 there had been 29 inquiries established under the act with a further two announced. Of these, 17 have completed costing a total of £158m.

=== Active inquiries ===
- UK Covid-19 Inquiry into the UK’s response to and impact of the Covid-19 pandemic

=== Completed inquires ===
- Inquiry into failures at Mid Staffordshire NHS Foundation Trust
- The Litvinenko Inquiry into the Poisoning of Alexander Litvinenko
- Leveson Inquiry into the News International phone hacking scandal
- Grenfell Tower Inquiry
- Manchester Arena Inquiry into the Manchester Arena bombing
- Independent Inquiry into Child Sexual Abuse - converted from an existing, non-statutory inquiry in July 2015
- Infected Blood Inquiry into the Contaminated blood scandal in the United Kingdom
- Post Office Horizon IT Inquiry into the British Post Office scandal - converted from an existing, non-statutory inquiry in September 2020
- It was announced in August 2023 that a statutory inquiry would be held into the circumstances surrounding the killings of children carried out by Lucy Letby, the Thirlwall report was published in September 2026

=== Forthcoming inquiries ===
- An Independent Inquiry into Grooming Gangs into the grooming gangs scandal was announced in June 2025, and it was announced in December 2025 that terms of reference would be confirmed no later than March 2026

== Repeals and revokes ==
The Inquiries Act 2005 repealed or revoked all or part of the following acts of Parliament or sections of acts:

- Regulation of Railways Act 1871 (34 & 35 Vict. c. 78) Section 7
- Ministry of Transport Act 1919 (9 & 10 Geo. 5. c. 50) section 20
- Tribunals of Inquiry (Evidence) Act 1921 (11 & 12 Geo. 5. c. 7)
- Local Government Act (Northern Ireland) 1923 (13 & 14 Geo. 5. c. 31 (N.I.))
- Petroleum (Consolidation) Act (Northern Ireland) 1929 (20 Geo. 5. c. 13 (N.I.))
- Road and Rail Traffic Act 1933 (23 & 24 Geo. 5. c. 53) .
- Prison Act (Northern Ireland) 1953 (c. 18 (N.I.))
- Agricultural Marketing Act 1958 (6 & 7 Eliz. 2. c. 47)
- Mental Health Act 1959 (7 & 8 Eliz. 2. c. 72)
- Transport Act 1962 (10 & 11 Eliz. 2. c. 46)
- Fees for Inquiries (Variation) Order 1968 (SI 1968/656)
- Civil Evidence Act 1968 (c. 64)
- Civil Evidence Act (Northern Ireland) 1971 (c. 36 (N.I.))
- Health and Personal Social Services (Northern Ireland) Order 1972 (SI 1972/1265)
- Local Government (Modifications and Repeals) Order (Northern Ireland) 1973 (SR&O (NI) 1973/285)
- National Health Service Act 1977 (c. 49)
- Health and Safety at Work (Northern Ireland) Order 1978 (SI 1978/1039)
- Public Passenger Vehicles Act 1981 (c. 14)
- Mental Health Act 1983 (c. 20)
- Road Traffic Regulation Act 1984 (c. 27)
- Fees (Increase) Order (Northern Ireland) 1984 (SR (NI) 1984/369)
- Local Government Act 1985 (c. 51)
- Education and Libraries (Northern Ireland) Order 1986 (SI 1986/594)
- Channel Tunnel Act 1987 (c. 53)
- Road Traffic Act 1988 (c. 52)
- Children Act 1989 (c. 41)
- National Health Service and Community Care Act 1990 (c. 19)
- Courts and Legal Services Act 1990 (c. 41)
- Further and Higher Education Act 1992 (c. 13)
- Children (Northern Ireland) Order 1995 (SI 1995/755)
- Police Act 1996 (c. 16)
- Education Act 1996 (c. 56)
- Police Act 1997 (c. 50)
- Police (Northern Ireland) Act 1998 (c. 32)
- Criminal Justice (Children) (Northern Ireland) Order 1998 (SI 1998/1504)
- Access to Justice Act 1999 (c. 22)
- Scotland Act 1998 (Cross-Border Public Authorities) (Adaptation of Functions etc.) Order 1999 (SI 1998/1747)
- Health Act 1999 (Supplementary and Consequential Provisions) Order 1999 (SI 1999/2795)
- Powers of Criminal Courts (Sentencing) Act 2000 (c. 6)
- Local Government Act 2000 (c. 22)
- Regulation of Investigatory Powers Act 2000 (c. 23)
- Adoption and Children Act 2002 (c. 38)
- Railway Safety Act (Northern Ireland) 2002 (c. 8 (N.I.))
- Health and Social Care (Community Health and Standards) Act 2003 (c. 43)
- Fire and Rescue Services Act 2004 (c. 21)

== See also ==
- Public inquiry (public inquiries in different countries)
