= Corn Production Act 1917 =

Act of the Parliament of the United Kingdom

Corn Production Act 1917 (Note: Section 19(1).)
- Act of Parliament
- Parliament of the United Kingdom
- Long title: An Act for encouraging the production of Corn, and for purposes connected therewith (including provision as to Agricultural Wages and Rents).
- Citation: 7 & 8 Geo. 5. c. 46
- Territorial extent: United Kingdom

Dates
- Royal assent: 21 August 1917
- Commencement: 21 August 1917 (Note: Section 19(2).)
- Repealed: 1 October 1921
Other legislation
Amended by	Corn Production (Amendment) Act 1918; Agriculture Act 1920
Repealed by	Corn Production Acts (Repeal) Act 1921

Status: Repealed

Text of statute as originally enacted

The Corn Production Act 1917 (7 & 8 Geo. 5. c. 46) was an act of the Parliament of the United Kingdom, passed under David Lloyd George's coalition government during the Great War. The act guaranteed British farmers a good price for their cereal crops so that Britain would not have to import them, as German U-boats were sinking ships importing food into Britain.

== Subsequent developments ==
The whole act was repealed by section 1 of the Corn Production Acts (Repeal) Act 1921 (11 & 12 Geo. 5. c. 48), which came into force on 1 October 1921.
