= Agriculture Act 1920 =

Act of the Parliament of the United Kingdom

Agriculture Act 1920 (Note: Section 36(4).)
- Act of Parliament
- Parliament of the United Kingdom
- Long title: An Act to amend the Corn Production Act, 1917, and the Enactments relating to Agricultural Holdings.
- Citation: 10 & 11 Geo. 5. c. 76
- Territorial extent: England and Wales; Scotland; (Note: Section 35.)

Dates
- Royal assent: 23 December 1920
- Commencement: 1 January 1921 (Note: Section 36(1).)
- Repealed: 23 July 1958
Other legislation
| Amends | See § Repealed enactments |
| Repeals/revokes | See § Repealed enactments |
| Amended by | Agriculture (Amendment) Act 1921; Agricultural Holdings (Scotland) Act 1923; Agricultural Wages (Regulation) Act 1924; Housing Act 1925; Housing (Scotland) Act 1925; Agricultural Holdings Act 1923 |
| Repealed by | Statute Law Revision Act 1958 |

Status: Repealed

Text of statute as originally enacted

The Agriculture Act 1920 (10 & 11 Geo. 5. c. 76) was an act of the Parliament of the United Kingdom passed in December 1920 by the Coalition Government.

It was designed to support price guarantees for agricultural products, and to maintain minimum wages for farm labourers. However, it proved ineffective; the guarantees were abandoned in July 1921, with the relevant parts of the act repealed, and the price of wheat crashed from 84s 7d a quarter to 44s 7d within one year – a drop of 48%.

The act had established wage committees to fix minimum agricultural pay; these, too, were soon abandoned. A replacement system of "conciliation committees" was set up to mediate between employers and labourers, but these had no legal powers, and the average weekly wage fell from 46s at the beginning of 1921 to 36s by the end of the year, and to 28s a week within eighteen months of the repeal.

The next attempt to fix agricultural wages would be Labour's Agricultural Wages (Regulation) Act 1924 14 & 15 Geo. 5. c. 37).

== Provisions ==
=== Repealed enactments ===
Section 29 of the act repealed so much of the Agricultural Holdings Act 1908 (8 Edw. 7. c. 28) as specified in the first schedule to the act.

Section 36(3) of the act repealed 8 enactments, listed in the second schedule to the act.

| Citation | Short title | Description | Extent of Repeal |
|---|---|---|---|
| 14 & 15 Vict. c. 25 | Landlord and Tenant Act 1851 | The Landlord and Tenant Act, 1851 | In section one, the words from “Provided always,” to the end of the section. |
| 8 Edw. 7 c. 28 | Agricultural Holdings Act 1908 | The Agricultural Holdings Act, 1908 | Subsections (2) and (3) of section six; section eleven; subsection (2) of section thirteen; section twenty-two; in paragraph (iii) of section twenty-three the words “for labourers”; section twenty-seven; in subsection (1) of section forty the words “the powers by this Act conferred on a landlord (other than that of entering on a holding for the purpose of viewing the state of the holding)”; in subsection (2) of section forty the words “the powers by this Act conferred on a landlord (other than as aforesaid).” |
| 8 Edw. 7 c. 64 | Agricultural Holdings (Scotland) Act 1908 | The Agricultural Holdings (Scotland) Act, 1908 | Subsections (2) and (3) of section six; section ten; subsection (2) of section eleven; section twenty-four; in section twenty-eight the words “the powers by this Act conferred on a landlord (other than that of entering on a holding for the purpose of viewing the state of the holding).” |
| 10 Edw. 7 & 1 Geo. 5 c. 34 | Small Holdings Act 1910 | The Small Holdings Act, 1910 | The whole act. |
| 4 & 5 Geo. 5 c. 7 | Agricultural Holdings Act 1914 | The Agricultural Holdings Act, 1914 | The whole act. |
| 6 & 7 Geo. 5 c. 38 | Small Holding Colonies Act 1916 | The Small Holding Colonies Act, 1916 | Subsection (2) of section one. |
| 7 & 8 Geo. 5 c. 46 | Corn Production Act 1917 | The Corn Production Act, 1917 | Subsection (1) of section two and section nine; subsection (2) of section nineteen. |
| 8 & 9 Geo. 5 c. 36 | Corn Production (Amendment) Act 1918 | The Corn Production (Amendment) Act, 1918 | The whole act. |

== Subsequent developments ==
The whole act was repealed by section 1 of, and the first schedule to, the Statute Law Revision Act 1958 (6 & 7 Eliz. 2. c. 46), which came into force on 23 July 1958.

== Bibliography ==
- Facts and Figures for Socialists, 1951. Labour Party Research Department, London, 1950
