= Tribunals of Inquiry (Evidence) Act 1921 =

Act of the Parliament of the United Kingdom

Tribunals of Inquiry (Evidence) Act 1921 (Note: Section 3.)
- Act of Parliament
- Parliament of the United Kingdom
- Long title: An Act to make provision with respect to the taking of evidence before and the procedure and powers of certain Tribunals of Inquiry.
- Citation: 11 & 12 Geo. 5. c. 7
- Introduced by: Sir Gordon Hewart (Commons)
- Territorial extent: United Kingdom

Dates
- Royal assent: 24 March 1921
- Commencement: 24 March 1921 (Note: The Acts of Parliament (Commencement) Act 1793.)
- Repealed: 7 June 2005 (Note: The Inquiries Act 2005 (Commencement) Order 2005 (SI 2005/1432).)
Other legislation
Amended by	Statute Law (Repeals) Act 1995
Repealed by	Inquiries Act 2005

Status: Repealed

Text of statute as originally enacted

Revised text of statute as amended

The Tribunals of Inquiry (Evidence) Act 1921 (11 & 12 Geo. 5. c. 7) was an act of the Parliament of the United Kingdom, now repealed, which set out the powers and functions of certain Tribunals of Inquiry along with the procedures for the taking of evidence. The act did not give blanket powers for a tribunal of inquiry to be set up ad hoc. For a tribunal to be established under the Act, the matter in question would need to be one of urgent public significance; and would need to be authorised by the Secretary of State. If these prerequisites were met, such an inquiry would be established with judicial powers—in the same way as the High Court or the Court of Session in Scotland.

The act was passed before Ireland separated from the United Kingdom. It remains in force, as amended, as part of law of public inquiries in the Republic of Ireland

== History of the act ==
On 4 March 1921, the Tribunals Of Inquiry (Evidence) Bill was introduced in Parliament and in just under three weeks, became law. The act received royal assent on 24 March 1921 and came into force immediately.

On 22 February 1921, a controversy came to a head which involved certain high–ranking officials at the Ministry of Munitions who were supposed to have summoned the heads of ledger departments and accounts investigators to order them to conceal papers from the Exchequer and Audit Departments. The papers, which were alleged to have been destroyed, (Note: Otherwise known as the Sutton case, and reported in the press as the British Munitions Scandal. The allegations made by Captain C. E. Loseby, the Independent member for Bradford, were not upheld. When the tribunal of inquiry reported in June 1921, it became clear that the two witnesses who had been called did not corroborate the claim regarding the destruction of what were referred to as 'working papers'.) related to the outcome of certain investigations regarding the entitlement of contractors, and involved sums in the many millions. The disappearance of the materials would serve to be monetarily beneficial to the officials.

During a House of Commons debate of 22 February 1921, Captain Loseby claimed that there were sworn affidavits from those who witnessed the order to destroy being given. In trying to ascertain what had happened to the papers, the formation a new committee was advanced as a possible solution. The committee would be chaired by a judge. It naturally followed that the question should be posed as to whether it would be necessary to have an act of Parliament in place in order for the proposed Committee to be able to hear evidence on oath.

As a result of the House of Commons debate of 22 February, plans were set in motion for a succinct piece of legislation that would enable the proposed committee to take evidence on oath, this engendered the Tribunals Of Inquiry (Evidence) Bill.

On 9 April 1999, the Joint Committee on Parliamentary Privilege released their first report, titled Parliamentary Privilege: Volume 1 – Report, in which mention is made of the Tribunals of Inquiry (Evidence) Act 1921 having become law in the wake of the Marconi affair and as a result of the ensuing scandal over an unsatisfactory parliamentary inquiry.

== See also ==
- Inquiries Act 2005
- Public inquiries under the Tribunals of Inquiry (Evidence) Act 1921
