= Agricultural Holdings Act 1908 =

Act of the Parliament of the United Kingdom

Agricultural Holdings Act 1908 (Note: Section 51(1).)
- Act of Parliament
- Parliament of the United Kingdom
- Long title: An Act to consolidate the Enactments relating to Agricultural Holdings in England and Wales.
- Citation: 8 Edw. 7. c. 28
- Territorial extent: England and Wales (Note: Section 51(2).)

Dates
- Royal assent: 1 August 1908
- Commencement: 1 January 1909 (Note: Section 50.)
- Repealed: 7 July 1923
Other legislation
Amends	See § Repealed enactments
Repeals/revokes	See § Repealed enactments
Amended by	Agricultural Holdings Act 1913; Agricultural Holdings Act 1914; Agriculture Act 1920; Agriculture (Amendment) Act 1921
Repealed by	Agricultural Holdings Act 1923
Relates to	Agricultural Holdings (Scotland) Act 1908

Status: Repealed

Text of statute as originally enacted

The Agricultural Holdings Act 1908 (8 Edw. 7. c. 28) was an act of the Parliament of the United Kingdom that consolidated enactments related to agricultural holdings in England and Wales.

The Agricultural Holdings (Scotland) Act 1908 (8 Edw. 7 c. 64) made similar provisions for Scotland.

== Provisions ==
=== Repealed enactments ===
Section 49 of the act repealed 6 enactments, listed in the fourth schedule to the act.

Citation	Short title	Extent of repeal
46 & 47 Vict. c. 61	Agricultural Holdings (England) Act 1883	The whole act.
53 & 54 Vict. c. 57	Tenants' Compensation Act 1890	In section one the words "the Agricultural Holdings Act, 1883, and." Section two, except so far as relates to compensation under the Allotments and Cottage Gardens (Compensation for Crops) Act, 1887. Section three and section four.
58 & 59 Vict. c. 27	Market Gardeners' Compensation Act 1895	The whole act.
63 & 64 Vict. c. 50	Agricultural Holdings Act 1900	The whole act, except so far as it relates to Scotland.
6 Edw. 7. c. 56	Agricultural Holdings Act 1906	The whole act, except so far as it relates to Scotland.
7 Edw. 7. c. 54	Small Holdings and Allotments Act 1907	Section thirty-eight.

== Subsequent developments ==
The whole act was repealed by section 58(3) of, and the fourth schedule to, the Agricultural Holdings Act 1923 (13 & 14 Geo. 5. c. 9), which came into force on 7 July 1923.
