= Agricultural Holdings (Scotland) Act 1908 =

Act of the Parliament of the United Kingdom

Agricultural Holdings (Scotland) Act 1908 (Note: Section 38(1).)
- Act of Parliament
- Parliament of the United Kingdom
- Long title: An Act to consolidate the Enactments relating to Agricultural Holdings in Scotland.
- Citation: 8 Edw. 7. c. 64
- Territorial extent: Scotland (Note: Section 38(2).)

Dates
- Royal assent: 21 December 1908
- Commencement: 1 January 1909 (Note: Section 37.)
- Repealed: 7 July 1923
Other legislation
Amends	See § Repealed enactments
Repeals/revokes	See § Repealed enactments
Amended by	Agricultural Holdings (Scotland) Amendment Act 1910; Agriculture (Amendment) Act 1921
Repealed by	Agriculture Act 1920; Agricultural Holdings (Scotland) Act 1923
Relates to	Agricultural Holdings Act 1908

Status: Repealed

Text of statute as originally enacted

The Agricultural Holdings (Scotland) Act 1908 (8 Edw. 7. c. 64) was an act of the Parliament of the United Kingdom that consolidated enactments related to agricultural holdings in Scotland.

The Agricultural Holdings Act 1908 (8 Edw. 7. c. 28) made similar provisions for England and Wales.

== Provisions ==
=== Repealed enactments ===
Section 36 of the act repealed 4 enactments, listed in the fourth schedule to the act.

Citation	Short title	Extent of repeal
46 & 47 Vict. c. 62	Agricultural Holdings (Scotland) Act 1883	The whole act.
60 & 61 Vict. c. 22	Market Gardeners Compensation (Scotland) Act 1897	The whole act.
63 & 64 Vict. c. 50	Agricultural Holdings Act 1900	The whole act, so far as not repealed.
6 Edw. 7. c. 56	Agricultural Holdings Act 1906	The whole act, so far as not repealed.

== Subsequent developments ==
The whole act, so far as unrepealed, was repealed by section 50 of, and the fourth schedule to, the Agricultural Holdings (Scotland) Act 1923 (13 & 14 Geo. 5. c. 10), which came into operation on 7 July 1923.
