= Cowan v Scargill =

1985 English trusts law case

- Court: High Court
- Citation: [1985] Ch 270

Case opinions
- Megarry VC

Keywords
- Duty of care, ethical investment

Cowan v Scargill [1985] Ch 270 is an English trusts law case, concerning the scope of discretion of trustees to make investments for the benefit of their members. It held that trustees cannot ignore the financial interests of the beneficiaries.

Some of the obiter dicta in Cowan, however, have been implicitly doubted by Harries v The Church Commissioners for England, which held that trustees are entitled to consider the social and moral interests of the beneficiaries where they relate to the express or implied objects of the trust. Furthermore, the Goode Report on Pension Law Reform in 1993 stated the law to be that trustees "are perfectly entitled to have a policy on ethical investment and to pursue that policy, so long as they treat the interests of the beneficiaries as paramount and the investment policy is consistent with the standards of care and prudence required by law." In 2014, the Law Commission (England and Wales) commented that the case should not be seen as precluding pension trustees from taking account of environmental, social and governance factors when making investments.

== Facts ==
The trustees of the National Coal Board pension fund had £3,000 million in assets. Five of the ten trustees were appointed by the NCB and the other five were appointed by the National Union of Mineworkers. The board of trustees set the general strategy, while day to day investment was managed by a specialist investment committee. Under a new "Investment Strategy and Business Plan 1982" the NUM wanted the pension fund to (1) cease new overseas investment (2) gradually withdraw existing overseas investments and (3) withdraw investments in industries competing with coal. This was all intended to enhance the mines' business prospects. The five NCB nominated trustees made a claim in court over the appropriate exercise of the pension fund's powers.

Mr JR Cowan was the deputy-chairman of the board. Arthur Scargill led the NUM and was one of the five member nominated trustees, and represented the other four in person.

== Judgment ==
Megarry VC held the NUM trustees would be in breach of trust if they followed the instructions of the union, saying ‘the best interests of the beneficiaries are normally their best financial interests.’ So if investments of an unethical type ‘would be more beneficial to the beneficiaries than other investments, the trustees must not refrain from making the investments by virtue of the views that they hold.’ Only if all beneficiaries, all of full age, consent to something different is it possible to invest ethically. His judgment outlined his view of the law.

The starting point is the duty of trustees to exercise their powers in the best interests of the present and future beneficiaries of the trust, holding the scales impartially between different classes of beneficiaries. This duty of the trustees towards their beneficiaries is paramount. They must, of course, obey the law; but subject to that, they must put the interests of their beneficiaries first. When the purpose of the trust is to provide financial benefits for the beneficiaries, as is usually the case, the best interests of the beneficiaries are normally their best financial interests. In the case of a power of investment, as in the present case, the power must be exercised so as to yield the best return for the beneficiaries, judged in relation to the risks of the investments in question; and the prospects of the yield of income and capital appreciation both have to be considered in judging the return from the investment.

The legal memorandum that the union obtained from their solicitors is generally in accord with these views. In considering the possibility of investment for "socially beneficial reasons which may result in lower returns to the fund," the memorandum states that "the trustees' only concern is to ensure that the return is the maximum possible consistent with security"; and then it refers to the need for diversification. However, it continues by saying:

"Trustees cannot be criticised for failing to make a particular investment for social or political reasons, such as in South African stock for example, but may be held liable for investing in assets which yield a poor return or for disinvesting in stock at inappropriate times for non-financial criteria."

This last sentence must be considered in the light of subsequent passages in the memorandum which indicate that the sale of South African securities by trustees might be justified on the ground of doubts about political stability in South Africa and the long-term financial soundness of its economy, whereas trustees could not properly support motions at a company meeting dealing with pay levels in South Africa, work accidents, pollution control, employment conditions for minorities, military contracting and consumer protection. The assertion that trustees could not be criticised for failing to make a particular investment for social or political reasons is one that I would not accept in its full width. If the investment in fact made is equally beneficial to the beneficiaries, then criticism would be difficult to sustain in practice, whatever the position in theory. But if the investment in fact made is less beneficial, then both in theory and in practice the trustees would normally be open to criticism. This leads me to the second point, which is a corollary of the first.

In considering what investments to make trustees must put on one side their own personal interests and views. Trustees may have strongly held social or political views. They may be firmly opposed to any investment in South Africa or other countries, or they may object to any form of investment in companies concerned with alcohol, tobacco, armaments or many other things. In the conduct of their own affairs, of course, they are free to abstain from making any such investments. Yet under a trust, if investments of this type would be more beneficial to the beneficiaries than other investments, the trustees must not refrain from making the investments by reason of the views that they hold.

Trustees may even have to act dishonourably (though not illegally) if the interests of their beneficiaries require it. Thus where trustees for sale had struck a bargain for the sale of trust property but had not bound themselves by a legally enforceable contract, they were held to be under a duty to consider and explore a better offer that they received, and not to carry through the bargain to which they felt in honour bound: Buttle v Saunders [1950] 2 All ER 193 . In other words, the duty of trustees to their beneficiaries may include a duty to "gazump," however honourable the trustees. As Wynn-Parry J. said at p. 195, trustees "have an overriding duty to obtain the best price which they can for their beneficiaries." In applying this to an official receiver in In re Wyvern Developments Ltd [1974] 1 WLR 1097, 1106, Templeman J. said that he "must do his best by his creditors and contributories. He is in a fiduciary capacity and cannot make moral gestures, nor can the court authorise him to do so." In the words of Sir James Wigram VC in Balls v Strutt (1841) 1 Hare 146, 149:

"It is a principle in this court, that a trustee shall not be permitted to use the powers which the trust may confer upon him at law, except for the legitimate purposes of his trust;..."

Powers must be exercised fairly and honestly for the purposes for which they are given and not so as to accomplish any ulterior purpose, whether for the benefit of the trustees or otherwise: see Duke of Portland v Topham (1864) 11 HLCas 32, a case on a power of appointment that must apply a fortiori to a power given to trustees as such.

Third, by way of caveat I should say that I am not asserting that the benefit of the beneficiaries which a trustee must make his paramount concern inevitably and solely means their financial benefit, even if the only object of the trust is to provide financial benefits. Thus if the only actual or potential beneficiaries of a trust are all adults with very strict views on moral and social matters, condemning all forms of alcohol, tobacco and popular entertainment, as well as armaments, I can well understand that it might not be for the "benefit" of such beneficiaries to know that they are obtaining rather larger financial returns under the trust by reason of investments in those activities than they would have received if the trustees had invested the trust funds in other investments. The beneficiaries might well consider that it was far better to receive less than to receive more money from what they consider to be evil and tainted sources. "Benefit" is a word with a very wide meaning, and there are circumstances in which arrangements which work to the financial disadvantage of a beneficiary may yet be for his benefit: see, for example, In re T's Settlement Trusts [1964] Ch 158 and In re CL [1969] 1 Ch 587. But I would emphasise that such cases are likely to be very rare, and in any case I think that under a trust for the provision of financial benefits the burden would rest, and rest heavy, on him who asserts that it is for the benefit of the beneficiaries as a whole to receive less by reason of the exclusion of some of the possibly more profitable forms of investment. Plainly the present case is not one of this rare type *289 of cases. Subject to such matters, under a trust for the provision of financial benefits, the paramount duty of the trustees is to provide the greatest financial benefits for the present and future beneficiaries.

Fourth, the standard required of a trustee in exercising his powers of investment is that he must

"take such care as an ordinary prudent man would take if he were minded to make an investment for the benefit of other people for whom he felt morally bound to provide:" per Lindley L.J. in In re Whiteley (1886) 33 ChD 347, 355; see also at pp. 350, 358; and see Learoyd v Whiteley (1887) 12 App.Cas. 727.

That duty includes the duty to seek advice on matters which the trustee does not understand, such as the making of investments, and on receiving that advice to act with the same degree of prudence. This requirement is not discharged merely by showing that the trustee has acted in good faith and with sincerity. Honesty and sincerity are not the same as prudence and reasonableness. Some of the most sincere people are the most unreasonable; and Mr. Scargill told me that he had met quite a few of them. Accordingly, although a trustee who takes advice on investments is not bound to accept and act on that advice, he is not entitled to reject it merely because he sincerely disagrees with it, unless in addition to being sincere he is acting as an ordinary prudent man would act.

Fifth, trustees have a duty to consider the need for diversification of investments. By section 6(1) of the Trustee Investments Act 1961:

"In the exercise of his powers of investment a trustee shall have regard - (a) to the need for diversification of investments of the trust, in so far as is appropriate to the circumstances of the trust; (b) to the suitability to the trust of investments of the description of investment proposed and of the investment proposed as an investment of that description."

The reference to the "circumstances of the trust" plainly includes matters such as the size of the trust funds: the degree of diversification that is practicable and desirable for a large fund may plainly be impracticable or undesirable (or both) in the case of a small fund.

== Significance ==
While the case has often been cited as controversial, given the doubts it may have given rise to over ethical investment, it did not lay down a rule that pension funds or other trustees must single-mindedly act in their beneficiaries' exclusive financial interest, nor did it say that pension trusts cannot invest ethically if they have opted for such an investment in their trust deeds. However Megarry VC did appear to question a previous decision by Brightman J in Evans v London Co-operative Society that pension trustees could take into account the interests of employees of the workplace in making investment decisions. The most important report on pensions, the Goode Report chaired by Roy Goode stated it was clear that Cowan together with the rest of the law on fiduciary duties clearly allowed for ethical investment. The following was reported.

We believe the law on this matter to be clear. Trustees are not obliged to divest themselves of all their personal beliefs and social and political views in managing the investments of the pension fund. As trustees they are perfectly entitled to have a policy on ethical investment and to pursue that policy, so long as they treat the interests of the beneficiaries as paramount and the investment policy is consistent with the standards of care and prudence required by law. This means that trustees are free to avoid certain kinds of prudent investment which they consider the scheme members would regard as objectionable, so long as they make equally advantageous investments elsewhere, and that they are entitled to put funds into investments which they believe the members would regard as desirable, so long as these are proper investments on other grounds. What trustees are not entitled to do is to subordinate the interests of the beneficiaries to ethical or social demands and thereby deprive the beneficiaries of investment or opportunities they would otherwise have enjoyed.

In 2005, authored by Paul Watchman of Freshfields, a report for UNEP suggested that the effects of Cowan had been overstated and that it was no precedent at all for saying ethical considerations could not be taken into account. In 2014, the Law Commission (England and Wales) reviewed this area of law. It concluded that when trustees make a long term investment in a company they may take account of risks to that company’s long-term sustainability, including risks arising from environmental degradation or from the company’s treatment of customers, suppliers or employees. Trustees may also take account of non-financial factors, where they have good reason to think that the scheme members share their views and that the decision does not risk significant financial detriment. The Law Commission published a six page guide for trustees on this issue.

In 2016, UNEP FI, the PRI, and The Generation Foundation launched a project to end the debate on whether fiduciary duty is a legitimate barrier to the integration of environmental, social and governance (ESG) issues in investment practice and decision-making. This follows the 2015 publication of Fiduciary Duty in the 21st Century by the PRI, UNEP FI, UNEP Inquiry and UN Global Compact which concluded that “failing to consider all long-term investment value drivers, including ESG issues, is a failure of fiduciary duty". It also found that ten years after the Freshfields Report, despite significant progress, many investors had yet to fully integrate ESG issues into their investment decision-making processes.

The Fiduciary Duty in the 21st Century Programme was founded on the realization that there is a general lack of legal clarity globally about the relationship between sustainability and investors’ fiduciary duty. Having engaged with and interviewed over 400 policymakers and investors, the programme published roadmaps setting out recommendations to fully embed the consideration of environmental, social and governance factors in the fiduciary duties of investors across more than eight capital markets, including the UK. Several recommendations are being implemented. Drawing upon findings from Fiduciary Duty in the 21st Century, the European Commission High-Level Expert Group (HLEG) recommended in its 2018 final report that the EU Commission clarify investor duties to better embrace long-term horizon and sustainability preferences.

== See also ==
- Re Gestetner Settlement [1953] Ch 672
- Evans v London Co-operative Society [1976] CLY 2059, (6 July 1976) Times
- Re Hay’s Settlement Trust [1982] 1 WLR 202
- Re Manisty’s Settlement [1974] 1 Ch 17, Templeman J, courts will intervene on dispositive discretions (who gets what) if it ‘could be said to be irrational, perverse or irrelevant to any sensible expectation of the settlor'
- Klug v Klug [1918] 2 Ch 67
- Re Hastings-Bass [1975] Ch 25
- Kerr v British Leyland (Staff) Trustees Ltd (1986) [2001] WTLR 1071, pension beneficiaries who have 'purchased their rights' are entitled to 'properly informed consideration' of claims they make
- Mettoy Pension Trustees Ltd v Evans [1990] 1 WLR 1587
- Stannard v Fisons Pensions Trust Ltd [1992] IRLR 27; [1991] PLR 225
- Abacus Trust Co v NSPCC [2001] WTLR 953, trustees took advice on how to minimise tax liability, but did not implement the advice till after the tax year’s end.
- Green v Cobham [2000] WTLR 1101, the trustee changed residential status. This meant huge capital gains liability increase. Held, not all factors taken into account, so breach of trust.
- Abacus Trust Co v Barr [2003] Ch 409
- Sieff v Fox [2005] 1 WLR 3811

Company law

- Evans v Brunner, Mond and Co Ltd [1921] 1 Ch 359
- Re Lee, Behrens and Co Ltd [1932] 2 Ch 46
- Re Horsley & Weight Ltd [1982] Ch 442
