= Sustainable Stock Exchanges Initiative =

United Nations organization

Sustainable Stock Exchanges (SSE) Initiative

- Type: United Nations Initiative
- Parent organization: UNCTAD; The Global Compact; UNEP-FI; PRI
- Website: www.sseinitiative.org

The Sustainable Stock Exchanges (SSE) initiative promoting corporate investment in sustainable development. It is a project of the United Nations (UN) co-organized by the United Nations Conference on Trade and Development (UNCTAD), the United Nations Global Compact, the United Nations Environment Programme Finance Initiative (UNEP-FI) and the UN-supported Principles for Responsible Investment (PRI).

Other key stakeholders include the World Federation of Exchanges (WFE), and the International Organization of Securities Commissions (IOSCO). The SSE provides a multi-stakeholder learning platform for stock exchanges, investors, regulators, and companies.

== History ==
The first meeting of the SSE was opened by UN Secretary-General Ban Ki-moon in New York City in 2009. Subsequently, the SSE began holding "Global Dialogues" every two years, starting with the 2010 SSE Global Dialogue in Xiamen, China, which took place as part of the UNCTAD World Investment Forum. The second SSE Global Dialogue was held in 2012 in Rio de Janeiro, Brazil, as part of the Global Compact Corporate Sustainability Forum.

At the SSE 2012 Global Dialogue a new dimension to the Initiative was launched, with the five participating stock exchanges making a voluntary public commitment to sustainability in their markets, thereby becoming an SSE Partner Exchange. Since the event, several other leading exchanges have joined the group of SSE Partner Exchanges. UNCTAD, the UN Global Compact, the PRI and UNEP-FI, as the core organizer of the SSE Initiative, also committed to supporting stock exchanges in this effort.

The SSE initiative invites exchanges globally to become Partner Stock Exchange within the SSE by making a voluntary public commitment to promote improved ESG disclosure and performance among listed companies. In addition, the SSE welcomes participation from securities regulators, investors, companies and other key stakeholders within its Consultative Group. The PRI has an SSE Investor Working Group that has been actively engaged since 2009. The SSE's flagship event is its biennial Global Dialogues and it continues to develop new work streams to address specific stakeholder requests.

By 2018, the SSE had grown to 78 partner exchanges, including markets such as the New York Stock Exchange, the London Stock Exchange, and Nasdaq.

On 17 October 2023, the SSE became a partnership member of the Federation of Euro-Asian Stock Exchanges.

== SSE Global Dialogues ==
The Sustainable Stock Exchanges Global Dialogues are held every two years as the SSE initiative's flagship event. They provide a platform to explore how the world's exchanges can work together with investors, regulators and companies to create more sustainable capital markets. They are designed to analyze, promote and foster communication on stock exchanges' sustainability-related activities. They demonstrate the progress of stock exchanges while highlighting the challenges and opportunities ahead. Another core purpose is to facilitate the sharing of experiences that encourage exchanges and their regulators to enhance listing rules and regulatory initiatives to include the disclosure of sustainability strategies by listed companies.

The 2014 Global Dialogue was held in Geneva, Switzerland, on 14 October 2014, at the United Nations Palais de Nations. The focus of this event was "Capital Markets for Sustainable Development." It featured over 30 high-level roundtable speakers, consisting of CEOs and Chairmen of Stock Exchanges, investors, companies and standard setters, as well as capital market regulators and policymakers. This event was held as part of the four-day UNCTAD biennial World Investment Forum from October 13 to 17.

The 2012 Global Dialogue was held on 18 June 2012 in Rio de Janeiro, Brazil. It focused on the role of the world's stock exchanges in encouraging responsible, long-term investment and creating sustainable financial markets. The event took place in the days leading up to the United Nations Conference on Sustainable Development (Rio+20) as part of the UN Global Compact's Corporate Sustainability Forum (CSF).

The 2010 Global Dialogue was held on 8 September 2010 in Xiamen, China. It took place against the backdrop of UNCTAD's World Investment Forum and the China International Fair for Investment and Trade (CIFIT) which brought together 1,500 leaders from various stakeholder groups including governments, businesses, international organizations, investment promotion agencies, civil society, and international investment experts and practitioners from across the world.

The 2009 Global Dialogue was held on 2 November 2009. More than 100 top executives from around the world met at UN Headquarters in New York to explore how the world's exchanges can work together with investors, regulators, and companies to enhance corporate transparency, and ultimately performance, on environmental, social and corporate governance (ESG) issues and encourage responsible long-term approaches to investment.

== SSE Regional Dialogues ==
The SSE partners with exchanges, investors and other capital market leaders worldwide to bring capital market players together to identify, discuss and take collective action on common sustainability issues pertinent to their region or globally. These high-level events are open to the public and bring exchanges together with policymakers, regulators, investors, companies and other relevant stakeholders.

For SSE Regional Dialogue: LatAm & Caribbean, Latin America's four largest stock exchanges gathered in Colombia for the first Sustainable Stock Exchanges (SSE) Regional Dialogue: LatAm & Caribbean. The regional version of the flagship SSE Global Dialogue was facilitated by the SSE, hosted by the Colombian Securities Exchange (BVC), and sponsored by the Latin American Sustainable Investment Forum (LatinSIF).

The SSE Regional Dialogue: South East Asia was held on 18 May 2015. The Sustainable Stock Exchanges Regional Dialogue South East Asia kicked off in the heart of Bangkok, Thailand with the participation of more than 150 delegates from 13 countries. The SSE Regional Dialogue, as the first of its kind in South East Asia, offered a unique platform for CEOs of stock exchanges, listed companies and institutional investors, along with high-level policymakers and regulators, to demonstrate leadership and understanding of the sustainable development opportunities and challenges facing capital markets today.

Afternoon workshop sessions were made possible through the support of collaborating partners GRI (Global Reporting Initiative), CDSB (Climate Disclosure Standards Board), ASRIA (Asia Investment Group on Climate Change) and MSCI.

During the Regional Dialogue, leaders of the Hanoi, Hochiminh and Malaysia Stock Exchanges announced their public Commitments to join the SSE initiative as SSE Partner Exchanges.

The SSE Regional Dialogue: Nordic Countries began on 4 November 2015. The Sustainable Stock Exchanges Regional Dialogue: Nordic Countries took place in Helsinki, Finland. The SSE Regional Dialogue, the first of its kind in the region, offered a unique platform for CEO's of stock exchanges, listed companies and institutional investors, alongside high-level policy makers and regulators, to demonstrate leadership and understanding of the sustainable development opportunities and challenges facing capital markets today.

Hosted by Nasdaq Helsinki, the SSE Regional Dialogue welcomed more than 100 participants from across Nordic markets. A high-level policy dialogue took place in the morning of 4 November, followed in the afternoon by practical workshops to assist investors, companies and other capital market stakeholders with integrating sustainable development into investment and business strategies.

Eight new exchanges joined the SSE initiative at the SSE Regional Dialogue: Nordic Countries.

== SSE Leaders Luncheons ==
The SSE partners with exchanges, investors, and other capital market leaders worldwide to bring capital market players together to identify, discuss and take collective action on common sustainability issues alongside key events and UN summits. These events bring exchanges together with policy makers, regulators, investors, companies and other relevant stakeholders for candid conversations aimed at collectively problem solving key issues, challenges and opportunities facing capital markets today.

The SSE Leaders Luncheon: SDGs is held on the eve of the launch of the Sustainable Development Goals (SDGs) to bring together capital market leaders to discuss the role they can play in supporting the achievement of these goals. This high-level dialogue included CEOs from SSE Partner Exchanges, institutional investors and listed companies, joining public policy leaders from international organizations and national governments. All participants had an opportunity to speak and engage with their peers on the critical question of how markets can support sustainable development. The SSE Leaders Luncheon helped to set the agenda for how capital market actors can support the SDGs in the coming years. From sustainability reporting and mobilizing finance to gender equality and global partnerships, stock markets have an important role to play in promoting good corporate practices and facilitating investment in sustainable development.

The SSE Leaders Luncheon: Climate was held in December 2015. World leaders gathered for the 2015 United Nations Climate Change Conference (COP21) to complete a new global agreement. This summit caps a year that has seen numerous momentous international breakthroughs, from the G20 pact on climate policy to the China-USA Joint Presidential Announcement on Climate Change. As climate plays an increasingly prominent role in the development of investment policy and regulation, it also has a growing impact on capital markets, investors and corporations. COP21 set the stage for a new generation of global climate change policies that will influence markets for years to come.

This peer-to-peer CEO summit provided a platform for addressing climate challenges and opportunities and sharing views on the path forward. Hosted by Mirova and Natixis, this United Nations event welcomed an exclusive group of C-level participants from stock exchanges, institutional investors, and listed companies joining public policy leaders from international organizations, national governments and regulatory bodies.

== Partner exchanges ==
Name	Country	Region	Date Announced
Bolsa de Valores de El Salvador	El Salvador	Central America	30 Aug 2023
Armenia Securities Exchange	Armenia	Europe	11 Dec 2019
TMX Group	Canada	North America	19 Feb 2019
Macedonian Stock Exchange	North Macedonia	Europe	23 Jan 2019
Abu Dhabi Securities Exchange (ADX)	United Arab Emirates	Asia	16 Jan 2019
Budapest Stock Exchange (BSE)	Hungary	Europe	11 Jan 2019
Tadawul Stock Exchange	Saudi Arabia	Asia	4 Dec 2018
Quito Stock Exchange	Ecuador	South America	22 Oct 2018
Ulaanbaatar Securities Exchange (UBX)	Mongolia	Asia	24 Sep 2018
Bolsa de Valores de Panama	Panama	South America	11 Sep 2018
Belgrade Stock Exchange (BELEX)	Serbia	Europe	3 Aug 2018
Dhaka Stock Exchange (DSEBD)	Bangladesh	Asia	24 Jun 2018
Hong Kong Exchanges and Clearing Limited (HKEX)	China, Hong Kong	Asia	1 Jun 2018
Ljubljana Stock Exchange (LJSE)	Slovenia	Europe	10 May 2018
Bolsa Nacional de Valores	Costa Rica	South America	8 May 2018
Athens Exchange Group (HELEX)	Greece	Europe	8 Mar 2018
Banja Luka Stock Exchange (BLSE)	Bosnia Herzegovina	Europe	7 Mar 2018
Uganda Securities Exchange (USE)	Uganda	Africa	12 Feb 2018
Bolsas y Mercados Argentinos S.A. (BYMA)	Argentina	South America	20 Dec 2017
Japan Exchange Group (JPX)	Japan	Asia	6 Dec 2017
Shenzhen Stock Exchange (SZSE)	China	Asia	3 Dec 2017
Mongolian Stock Exchange (MSE)	Mongolia	Asia	21 Sep 2017
Shanghai Stock Exchange (SSE)	China	Asia	7 Sep 2017
Australian Securities Exchange (ASX)	Australia	Asia	26 Jun 2017
Chittagong Stock Exchange (CSE)	Bangladesh	Asia	5 Jun 2017
Boursa Kuwait	Kuwait	Asia	15 Nov 2016
Sydney Stock Exchange (SSX)	Australia	Asia	16 Sep 2016
Singapore Exchange	Singapore	Asia	6 Sep 2016
Namibia Stock Exchange	Namibia	Africa	20 Jul 2016
Botswana Stock Exchange (BSE)	Botswana	Africa	20 Jul 2016
Dar es Salaam Stock Exchange	Tanzania	Africa	29 Jun 2016
Dubai Financial Market (DFM)	United Arab Emirates	Asia	2 Jun 2016
Belarusian Currency and Stock Exchange (BCSE)	Belarus	Europe	1 Apr 2016
New Zealand Stock Exchange (NZX)	New Zealand	Asia	30 Mar 2016
Luxembourg Stock Exchange (LuxSE)	Luxembourg	Europe	16 Mar 2016
Amman Stock Exchange (ASE)	Jordan	Africa	10 Mar 2016
Trop – X	Seychelles	Africa	8 Feb 2016
Bourse Régionale des Valeurs Mobilières SA (BVRM)	Western Africa (Benin, Burkina Faso, Guinea Bissau, Côte d'Ivoire, Mali, Niger, Senegal, Togo)	Africa	7 Dec 2015
Zimbabwe Stock Exchange	Zimbabwe	Africa	7 Dec 2015
National Stock Exchange of India	India	Asia	7 Dec 2015
Casablanca Stock Exchange	Morocco	Africa	7 Dec 2015
Qatar Stock Exchange	Qatar	Middle East	7 Dec 2015
Euronext Paris	France	Europe	7 Dec 2015
Euronext Amsterdam	Netherlands	Europe	7 Dec 2015
Euronext Brussels	Belgium	Europe	7 Dec 2015
Euronext London	United Kingdom	Europe	7 Dec 2015
Euronext Lisbon	Portugal	Europe	7 Dec 2015
Bolsas y Mercados Españoles	Spain	Europe	7 Dec 2015
Aequitas Neo	Canada	North America	7 Dec 2015
Oslo Stock Exchange	Norway	Europe	4 Nov 2015
Stockholm Stock Exchange (Nasdaq Stockholm)	Sweden	Europe	4 Nov 2015
NASDAQ OMX Vilnius	Lithuania	Europe	4 Nov 2015
Riga Stock Exchange (Nasdaq Riga)	Latvia	Europe	4 Nov 2015
Iceland Stock Exchange (Nasdaq Iceland)	Iceland	Europe	4 Nov 2015
Helsinki Stock Exchange (Nasdaq Helsinki)	Finland	Europe	4 Nov 2015
Tallinn Stock Exchange (Nasdaq Tallinn)	Estonia	Europe	4 Nov 2015
Copenhagen Stock Exchange (Nasdaq Copenhagen)	Denmark	Europe	4 Nov 2015
Colombo Stock Exchange	Sri Lanka	Asia	24 Nov 2015
Stock Exchange of Mauritius	Mauritius	Africa	24 Nov 2015
Kazakhstan Stock Exchange	Kazakhstan	Asia	24 Nov 2015
Rwanda Stock Exchange	Rwanda	Africa	24 Nov 2015
Bourse des Valeurs Mobilières Tunis (BVMT)	Tunisia	Africa	6 Oct 2015
Korea Exchange	South Korea	Asia	19 May 2015
Hanoi Stock Exchange	Vietnam	Asia	18 May 2015
Ho Chi Minh City Stock Exchange (HoSE)	Vietnam	Asia	18 May 2015
Bursa Malaysia	Malaysia	Asia	18 May 2015
Bucharest Stock Exchange	Romania	Europe	27 March 2015
Nairobi Securities Exchange	Kenya	Africa	10 March 2015
Santiago Stock Exchange	Chile	South America	5 Dec 2014
Jamaica Stock Exchange (JSE)	Jamaica	North America	14 Oct 2014
Lima Stock Exchange (BVL)	Peru	South America	14 Oct 2014
Deutsche Börse	Germany	Europe	1 Oct 2014
Stock Exchange of Thailand (SET)	Thailand	Asia	10 Sep 2014
Mexican Stock Exchange (BMV)	Mexico	North America	26 Aug 2014
Colombia Stock Exchange (BVC)	Colombia	South America	22 Jul 2014
Borsa Italiana	Italy	Europe	2 Jun 2014
London Stock Exchange Group (LSE)	United Kingdom	Europe	2 Jun 2014
Warsaw Stock Exchange (WSE)	Poland	Europe	17 Dec 2013
Nigerian Stock Exchange (NSE)	Nigeria	Africa	31 Oct 2013
New York Stock Exchange (NYSE)	USA	North America	24 Jul 2013
Bombay Stock Exchange (BSE)	India	Asia	28 Sep 2012
NASDAQ OMX	USA	North America	18 Jun 2012
Johannesburg Stock Exchange (JSE)	South Africa	Africa	18 Jun 2012
Egyptian Exchange (EGX)	Egypt	Africa	18 Jun 2012
Borsa Istanbul	Turkey	Asia	18 Jun 2012
BM&FBOVESPA	Brazil	South America	18 Jun 2012
