= Trustee Act =

Trustee Act may refer to:

- Trustee Act 1925
- Trustee Act 2000
