= Trusts (Scotland) Act 1921 =

Act of the Parliament of the United Kingdom

Trusts (Scotland) Act 1921 (Note: Section 1.)
- Act of Parliament
- Parliament of the United Kingdom
- Long title: An Act to consolidate and amend the Law relating to Trusts in Scotland.
- Citation: 11 & 12 Geo. 5. c. 58
- Territorial extent: Scotland (Note: Long title.)

Dates
- Royal assent: 19 August 1921
- Commencement: 19 August 1921 (Note: The Acts of Parliament (Commencement) Act 1793.)
- Repealed: 16 June 2024 (Note: The Trusts and Succession (Scotland) Act 2024 (Commencement No. 1) Regulations 2024.)
Other legislation
Amends	See § Repealed enactments
Repeals/revokes	See § Repealed enactments
Amended by	Colonial Development Act 1929; Statute Law Revision Act 1950; Trustee Investments Act 1961; Trusts (Scotland) Act 1961; Succession (Scotland) Act 1964; Statute Law (Repeals) Act 1976; Statute Law (Repeals) Act 1977; Law Reform (Miscellaneous Provisions) (Scotland) Act 1980; Requirements of Writing (Scotland) Act 1995; Trustee Act 2000; Adults with Incapacity (Scotland) Act 2000; Abolition of Feudal Tenure etc. (Scotland) Act 2000; Charities and Trustee Investment (Scotland) Act 2005; Land Registration etc. (Scotland) Act 2012; Succession (Scotland) Act 2016; Trusts and Succession (Scotland) Act 2024
Repealed by	Trusts and Succession (Scotland) Act 2024
Relates to	Trustee Act 1893

Status: Repealed

Text of statute as originally enacted

Revised text of statute as amended

The Trusts (Scotland) Act 1921 (11 & 12 Geo. 5. c. 58) was an act of the Parliament of the United Kingdom that consolidated enactments related to trusts in Scotland.

== Provisions ==
=== Repealed enactments ===
Section 36 of the act repealed 21 enactments, listed in schedule C to the act.

Citation	Short title	Extent of repeal
9 & 10 Vict. c. 101	Public Money Drainage Act 1846	Section thirty-seven so far as it applies to Scotland.
24 & 25 Vict. c. 84	Trusts (Scotland) Act 1861	The whole act.
26 & 27 Vict. c. 73	India Stock Certificate Act 1863	Section four so far as it applies to Scotland.
27 & 28 Vict. c. 114	Improvement of Land Act 1864	Section sixty so far as it relates to trustees and so far as it applies to Scotland. Section sixty-one so far as it applies to Scotland.
28 & 29 Vict. c. 78	Mortgage Debenture Act 1865	Section forty so far as it applies to Scotland.
30 & 31 Vict. c. 97	Trusts (Scotland) Act 1867	The whole act.
31 & 32 Vict. c. 84	Entail Amendment (Scotland) Act 1868	Section seventeen.
33 & 34 Vict. c. 71	National Debt Act 1870	Section twenty-nine so far as it applies to Scotland.
34 & 35 Vict. c. 27	Debenture Stock Act 1871	The whole act.
40 & 41 Vict. c. 59	Colonial Stock Act 1877	Section twelve so far as it applies to Scotland.
43 & 44 Vict. c. 8	Isle of Man Loans Act 1880	Section seven so far as it relates to trustees and so far as it applies to Scotland.
47 & 48 Vict. c. 63	Trusts (Scotland) Amendment Act 1884	The whole act.
48 & 49 Vict. c. 25	East India Unclaimed Stock Act 1885	Subsection (3) of section twenty-three so far as it applies to Scotland.
50 & 51 Vict. c. 18	Trusts (Scotland) Act 1867 Amendment Act 1887	The whole act.
52 & 53 Vict. c. 39	Judicial Factors (Scotland) Act 1889	Sections eighteen and nineteen.
54 & 55 Vict. c. 34	Local Authorities Loans (Scotland) Act 1891	Subsection (3) of section forty-one. Section forty-four.
54 & 55 Vict. c. 44	Trusts (Scotland) Amendment Act 1891	The whole act.
60 & 61 Vict. c. 8	Trusts (Scotland) Act 1897	The whole act.
61 & 62 Vict. c. 42	Trusts (Scotland) Act 1898	The whole act.
63 & 64 Vict. c. 62	Colonial Stock Act 1900	Section two so far as it relates to trustees and so far as it applies to Scotland. Section three.
10 Edw. 7 & 1 Geo. 5. c. 22	Trusts (Scotland) Act 1910	The whole act.

== Subsequent developments ==
Section 36 of, and schedule C to, the act, which contained the repeal provisions, were repealed as spent by section 1 of, and the first schedule to, the Statute Law Revision Act 1950 (14 Geo. 6. c. 6), which came into force on 23 May 1950..

Sections 10 and 11 of the act, which governed the investment powers of trustees, were repealed by the Trustee Investments Act 1961 (9 & 10 Eliz. 2. c. 62) .

The act was repealed by section 87 of, and schedule to, the Trusts and Succession (Scotland) Act 2024 (asp 2), which came into force on 26 June 2024.
