= Agricultural Marketing Act 1958 =

Act of the Parliament of the United Kingdom

Agricultural Marketing Act 1958 (Note: Section 55(1).)
- Act of Parliament
- Parliament of the United Kingdom
- Long title: An Act to consolidate the Agricultural Marketing Acts, 1931 to 1949 (other than the provisions thereof relating to the sale of eggs), and certain other enactments conferring powers on boards administering schemes under those Acts regulating the marketing of milk, with corrections and improvements made under the Consolidation of Enactments (Procedure) Act, 1949.
- Citation: 6 & 7 Eliz. 2. c. 47
- Territorial extent: United Kingdom (Note: Section 53(1).)

Dates
- Royal assent: 23 July 1958
- Commencement: 23 August 1958 (Note: Section 55(2).)

Other legislation
- Amends: See § Repealed enactments
- Repeals/revokes: See § Repealed enactments
- Amended by: Charities Act 1960; Mortmain (Repeals) Act (Northern Ireland) 1960; Trustee Investments Act 1961; Recorded Delivery Service Act 1962; Northern Ireland Act 1962; Agriculture and Horticulture Act 1964; Industrial Expansion Act 1968; Agriculture (Miscellaneous Provisions) Act 1972; Northern Ireland Constitution Act 1973; Fair Trading Act 1973; Statute Law (Repeals) Act 1974; Agricultural Statistics Act 1979; Hops Marketing Act 1982; Agricultural Marketing (Northern Ireland) Order 1982; Insolvency Act 1986; Agriculture Act 1986; Courts and Legal Services Act 1990; Agriculture Act 1993; Arbitration Act 1996; Trustee Act 2000; Enterprise Act 2002; Criminal Justice Act 2003; Statute Law (Repeals) Act 2004; Agricultural Statistics (Northern Ireland) Order 2004; Inquiries Act 2005; Constitutional Reform Act 2005; Natural Environment and Rural Communities Act 2006; Crime and Courts Act 2013; Enterprise and Regulatory Reform Act 2013 (Competition) (Consequential, Transitional and Saving Provisions) Order 2014; Agriculture and Rural Communities (Scotland) Act 2024; Legislation (Procedure, Publication and Repeals) (Wales) Act 2025; Digital Markets, Competition and Consumers Act 2024 (Consequential Amendments) Regulations 2025

Status: Amended

Text of statute as originally enacted

Revised text of statute as amended

Text of the Agricultural Marketing Act 1958 as in force today (including any amendments) within the United Kingdom, from legislation.gov.uk.

The Agricultural Marketing Act 1958 (6 & 7 Eliz. 2. c. 47) is an act of the Parliament of the United Kingdom that consolidated enactments related to the marketing of agricultural products in the United Kingdom.

== Provisions ==
=== Repealed enactments ===
Section 54(1) of the act repealed 11 enactments, listed in the fourth schedule to the act.

Citation	Short title	Extent of repeal
21 & 22 Geo. 5. c. 42	Agricultural Marketing Act 1931	The whole act.
23 & 24 Geo. 5. c. 31	Agricultural Marketing Act 1933	The whole act except section twenty.
24 Geo. 5. c. 1	Agricultural Marketing (No. 2) Act 1933	The whole act.
24 & 25 Geo. 5. c. 51	Milk Act 1934	The whole act except section ten.
1 Edw. 8 & 1 Geo. 6. c. 66	Milk (Amendment) Act 1937	The whole act.
2 & 3 Geo. 6. c. 46	Milk Industry Act 1939	The whole act.
9 & 10 Geo. 6. c. 29	Agriculture (Artificial Insemination) Act 1946	Section five.
12, 13 & 14 Geo. 6. c. 37	Agriculture (Miscellaneous Provisions) Act 1949	Section six and in section fifteen, subsection (2).
12, 13 & 14 Geo. 6. c. 38	Agricultural Marketing Act 1949	The whole act.
14 Geo. 6. c. 36	Diseases of Animals Act 1950	In section seventy-two, subsection (2).
5 & 6 Eliz. 2. c. 57	Agriculture Act 1957	Section twenty-nine.

== Subsequent developments ==
The act has been amended on several occasions. The Fair Trading Act 1973 inserted section 19A, introducing provisions for investigation of complaints about the operation of agricultural marketing schemes. The Agriculture Act 1986 substituted words in the act. The Agriculture Act 1993 repealed Part I of the act in relation to milk in England and Wales and Scotland with effect from 1 November 1994, and in relation to potatoes with effect from 1 July 1997. Words in section 45(6) were repealed by schedule 37, part 9 of the Criminal Justice Act 2003.

Section 54(1) of, and schedule 4 to, the act were repealed by section 1 of, and part XI of the schedule to, the Statute Law (Repeals) Act 1974, which came into force on 27 June 1974.
