= Agriculture Act 1993 =

Act of the Parliament of the United Kingdom

Agriculture Act 1993 (Note: Section 65(1).)
- Act of Parliament
- Parliament of the United Kingdom
- Long title: An Act to make provision about milk marketing; to make provision about potato marketing; to provide for the payment of grants in connection with the marketing of certain commodities; to terminate national price support arrangements for wool and potatoes; to provide for the publication of an annual report on matters relevant to price support; to amend the Industrial Organisation and Development Act 1947 in relation to agriculture; and for connected purposes.
- Citation: 1993 c. 37
- Territorial extent: England and Wales; Scotland; Northern Ireland (in part); (Note: Section 65(4)–(5).)

Dates
- Royal assent: 27 July 1993
- Commencement: (Note: 27 July 1993 (part I)) (Note: Section 65(2)–(3).)

Other legislation
- Amends: Industrial Organisation and Development Act 1947; Agricultural Marketing Act 1958
- Amended by: Statute Law (Repeals) Act 2004

Status: Amended

Text of statute as originally enacted

Revised text of statute as amended

Text of the Agriculture Act 1993 as in force today (including any amendments) within the United Kingdom, from legislation.gov.uk.

The Agriculture Act 1993 (c. 37) is an act of the Parliament of the United Kingdom. The act ended the Milk Marketing Board and the Potato Marketing Scheme.

It then terminated the national price support arrangements for wool and potatoes and amended the Industrial Organisation and Development Act 1947 (10 & 11 Geo. 6. c. 40).

Commissioners of Inland Revenue v Aberdeen Milk Company Ltd was decided under this act.
