= Salvadoran Stock Exchange =

Stock exchange located in Santa Tecla, La Libertad, El Salvador

- Bolsa de Valores de El Salvador
- Type: Stock exchange
- Location: San Salvador, El Salvador
- Founded: April 27, 1992; 33 years ago
- Owner: Central Securities Depository (CEDEVAL)
- Key people: Rolando Duarte (President) Valentín Arrieta (CEO)
- Currency: United States dollar (USD)
- No. of listings: 34 (2009)
- Market cap: ▲US$4.8 billion (2023)
- Website: www.bolsadevalores.com.sv

The Salvadoran Stock Exchange (Spanish: Bolsa de Valores de El Salvador, BVES) is the stock exchange in the nation of El Salvador. The exchange is used for the securitization of various government infrastructure projects. It is overseen by Central Securities Depository (CEDEVAL).

Rolando Duarte is the President, and Valentín Arrieta is the CEO. As of 2009, there were 34 companies trading on the exchange, the vast majority in finance or insurance businesses.

A stock market was first established in El Salvador in 1965. It was closed on March 26, 1976, due to low levels of activity.

The current stock market was established in April 1992, three months after the Chapultepec Accords brought an end to the Salvadoran Civil War. The market grew from handling U.S. $600 million initially to more than U.S. $3.5 billion in 2011 and more than $4.8 billion in 2023.

In 2017, El Salvador and Panama began to integrate their stock markets. Nicaragua joined this project in 2023. From 2017 to 2023, over U.S. $460 million has been traded between the Salvadoran and Panamanian exchanges. Honduras and Guatemala are expected to join this project in the future.

The BVES is a member of the Federación Iberoamericana de Bolsas (FIAB), an organization of stock exchanges in Latin America, Spain, and Portugal. In August 2023, BVES joined the Sustainable Stock Exchanges Initiative.
