= Horserace Betting and Olympic Lottery Act 2004 =

Act of the Parliament of the United Kingdom

Horserace Betting and Olympic Lottery Act 2004 (Note: Section 42.)
- Act of Parliament
- Parliament of the United Kingdom
- Long title: An Act to make provision for the sale of the Tote; to make provision for the abolition of the horserace betting levy system; to make provision for the establishment of National Lottery games designed to raise money in connection with the hosting by London of the Olympic Games in 2012; and for connected purposes.
- Citation: 2004 c. 25
- Territorial extent: United Kingdom (Note: Section 41.)

Dates
- Royal assent: 28 October 2004
- Commencement: Various (Note: Section 40.)
Other legislation
Amends	Public Records Act 1958; Betting, Gaming and Lotteries Act 1963; Parliamentary Commissioner Act 1967; Horserace Betting Levy Act 1969; Finance Act 1969 (Note: Prospective.); House of Commons Disqualification Act 1975; Northern Ireland Assembly Disqualification Act 1975; Race Relations Act 1976; National Lottery etc. Act 1993; Trustee Act 2000; Freedom of Information Act 2000
Repeals/revokes	Horserace Totalisator and Betting Levy Boards Act 1972; Horserace Totalisator Board Act 1997
Amended by	National Lottery Act 2006; Transfer of Undertakings (Protection of Employment) Regulations 2006; Transfer of Functions (Olympics and Paralympics) Order 2007; Companies Act 2006 (Commencement No. 3, Consequential Amendments, Transitional Provisions and Savings) Order 2007; Companies Act 2006 (Consequential Amendments etc) Order 2008; Companies Act 2006 (Consequential Amendments, Transitional Provisions and Savings) Order 2009; Secretary of State for Culture, Olympics, Media and Sport Order 2010; Crime and Courts Act 2013; Public Bodies (Merger of the Gambling Commission and the National Lottery Commission) Order 2013

Status: Amended

Text of statute as originally enacted

Revised text of statute as amended

The Horserace Betting and Olympic Lottery Act 2004 (c. 25) is an act of the Parliament of the United Kingdom.

== Provisions ==
=== Horse racing ===
The act allowed for the sale of the Horserace Totalisator Board (Tote) to Betfred which had certain conditions. The sale of the Tote was delayed due to a European Commission investigation and the 2008 financial crisis.

The act also abolishes the Horserace Betting Levy Board. The Tote lost its monopoly on pool betting.

=== Olympic Lottery ===
The act allowed for the establishment of the Olympic Lottery Distribution Fund if the United Kingdom was successful in its bid to host the 2012 Summer Olympics.

=== Section 40 - Commencement ===
The following orders have been made under this section:

- The Horserace Betting and Olympic Lottery Act 2004 (Commencement No. 1) Order 2004 (SI 2004/3283 (c. 149))
- The Horserace Betting and Olympic Lottery Act 2004 (Commencement No. 2) Order 2005 (SI 2005/1134 (c. 52))
- The Horserace Betting and Olympic Lottery Act 2004 (Commencement No. 3) Order 2005 (SI 2005/1831 (c. 78))
- The Horserace Betting and Olympic Lottery Act 2004 (Commencement No. 4) Order 2011 (SI 2011/462 (c. 17))
- The Horserace Betting and Olympic Lottery Act 2004 (Commencement No. 5) Order 2011 (SI 2011/1704 (c. 64))
