= Trustee Act 2000 =

Act of the Parliament of the United Kingdom

Trustee Act 2000 (Note: Section 43.)
- Act of Parliament
- Parliament of the United Kingdom
- Long title: An Act to make fresh provision with respect to investment by trustees and persons having the investment powers of trustees, and by local authorities, and for purposes connected therewith.
- Citation: 2000 c. 29
- Territorial extent: England and Wales (Note: Section 42(4).)

Dates
- Royal assent: 23 November 2000
- Commencement: 1 February 2001 (Note: Section 42. The Trustee Act 2000 (Commencement) Order 2001.)
Other legislation
Amends	Trustee Act 1925; Agricultural Marketing Act 1958; Powers of Attorney Act 1971; National Heritage Act 1980
Repeals/revokes	Duchy of Cornwall Management Act 1893
Amended by	Land Registration Act 2002; Horserace Betting and Olympic Lottery Act 2004; Charities Act 2011

Status: Amended

Text of statute as originally enacted

Revised text of statute as amended

The Trustee Act 2000 (c. 29) is an act of the Parliament of the United Kingdom that regulates the duties of trustees in English trust law. Reform in these areas had been advised as early as 1982, and finally came about through the Trustee Bill 2000, based on the Law Commission's 1999 report "Trustees' Powers and Duties", which was introduced to the House of Lords in January 2000. The bill received royal assent on 23 November 2000 and came into force on 1 February 2001 through the Trustee Act 2000 (Commencement) Order 2001, a Statutory Instrument, with the act having effect over England and Wales.

The act covers five areas of trust law: the duty of care imposed upon trustees, trustees' power of investment, the power to appoint nominees and agents, the power to acquire land, and the power to receive remuneration for work done as a trustee. It sets a new duty of care, both objective and standard, massively extends the trustees' power of investment and limits the trustees' liability for the actions of agents, also providing for their remuneration for work done in the course of the trust.

== Background ==
Lawyers and academics had been pushing for reform of this area of law since at least 1982, when the Law Commission published a report advising reform of the rules over trustees delegating their powers to other people. Other trusts reform came about through the Trusts of Land and Appointment of Trustees Act 1996, but this did not cover most of trusts law. Although there were some other small changes (such as a 1996 Statutory Instrument that extended the rights of trustees under the Trustee Investments Act 1961) little else was done. Further papers were published on similar areas in 1997 and 1999, and finally the Trustee Bill 2000 was introduced to the House of Lords in January 2000, implementing the proposals laid out in the Law Commission's 1999 report "Trustees' Powers and Duties". The act was given royal assent on 23 November 2000, and most of it came into effect on 1 February 2001 through the Trustee Act 2000 (Commencement) Order 2001 (SI 2001/49).

== Provisions ==
The act is divided into six parts, forty-three sections and four schedules, and focuses upon five specific areas of law. These are the duty of care imposed upon trustees, trustees' power of investment, the power to appoint nominees and agents, the power to acquire land, and the power to receive remuneration for work done as a trustee.

=== Duty of care ===
Part I of the act sets out a general duty of care, which trustees have towards beneficiaries. Section 1 defines this duty, which is that a trustee,

must exercise such care and skill as is reasonable in the circumstances, having regard in particular -

(a) to any special knowledge or experience that he has or holds himself out as having, and
(b) if he acts as trustee in the course of a business or profession, to any special knowledge or experience that it is reasonable to expect of a person acting in the course of that kind of business or profession.

This test has both an objective and subjective element. There is an objective baseline of care that every trustee, depending on the size and responsibility of their office, to exercise "such care and skill as is reasonable in the circumstances". This codifies the common law and reflects company and insolvency law. It indicates that a professional trustee would be held to a higher standard than a family trustee. The subjective element requires a court to exercise greater scrutiny if a trustee had any special skills, which takes the trustee's ability above the objective baseline. So if a trustee had a special accountancy qualification that trustee would be expected to exercise a greater than normal degree of care over the trust's accounts.

According to Schedule 1, the duty of care may be excluded by the trust instrument, but if it is not, it must be exercised when,

- investing trust capital;
- acquiring or managing land;
- appointing or reviewing agents;
- insuring trust properties;
- exercising powers to compound liabilities;
- dealing with audits and valuations of trust property.

Commentators have agreed that this is largely a reiteration of the previous common law rule on the duty of care. In Speight v Gaunt, Lord Blackburn said that "as a general rule a trustee sufficiently discharges his duty if he takes in managing trust affairs all those precautions which an ordinary prudent man of business would take in managing similar affairs of his own", similar to an objective test. It has been pointed out that the new duty of care creates problems, because it sets a fixed, objective point. It is not known where this point is, however - a professional trustee obviously cannot be held to the standards of a lay trustee, but it has been seen as equally unfair that a lay trustee would be held to the standards of a professional one. This duty, unlike the previous common law duty, at no point requires the trustee to act. The duty of care has been seen to be advantageous to charities compared to the old one, because it allows those charities forced to employ lay trustees to use professional agents to exercise some duties.

=== Investment powers ===
Investment powers and limits on those powers are set out in Part II of the act. Section 3(1) states that "subject to the provisions of this part, a trustee may make any kind of investment that he could make if he was absolutely entitled to the assets of the trust". This is far looser than the previous provisions, which were contained in the Trustee Investments Act 1961. The 1961 Act was repeatedly criticised for its "very conservative investment policy for trustees". The powers of investment trustees were given were restrictive and narrow, and at the same time the trustees were expected to go through expensive and complicated procedures to exercise them. This new power of investment is treated as a default provision - it is overridden if the trust instrument itself restricts the ways trust money can be invested. If the trust instrument was created prior to 3 August 1961, however, its provisions regarding investments are treated as void. The new provisions apply retrospectively, i.e. to trusts created before the passage of the act. They do not, however, apply to trusts governed by the Charities Act 1993, Authorised Unit Trusts or occupational pension schemes.

Section 4 of the act requires trustees to look at the "standard investment criteria" when investing. These criteria are defined in Section 4(3) as the need to check the suitability of investments for the trust, and the importance of diversification. Section 4(2) requires that, having exercised their power of investment, trustees must regularly refer back to the standard investment criteria to check that they are being fulfilled. This does little more than restate what is given in the Trustee Investments Act 1961, however, and this provision has been criticised for not defining "suitable". In Cowan v Scargill [1985] Ch 270 Megarry VC suggested that trustees have an overriding duty to invest solely in the financial interests of beneficiaries, unless the trust instrument laid down otherwise. The act legally obliges trustees to maximise returns. So even though the National Union of Mineworkers' leader, Arthur Scargill, wanted the mineworkers' pensions to be reinvested in the British Coal industry and keep jobs, the court held that because this would make less money than other investments it would be a breach of trust. Subsequent case law has qualified this controversial principle, such as Harries v The Church Commissioners for England [1992] 1 WLR 1241, and it is a point of ongoing debate. It is assumed by academics that, if a trust suffered a loss as a result of a trustee investing in unsuitable areas, the trustee would be liable for breach of trust.

Under Section 5, trustees are required to obtain "proper advice" before investing, unless the circumstances mean that it is inappropriate or unnecessary to do so. "Proper advice" is defined in Section 5(4) as "advice of a person who is reasonably believed by the trustee to be qualified to give it by his ability in and practical experience of financial and other matters relating to the proposed investment". This is an objective test, and as with much of Section 4, is almost identical to the test laid out in the 1961 Act. The advice must be sought before the exercise of any investment power, and is also required if the trustee wishes to change where and how the trust is invested.

=== Acquisition of land ===
Rules on the acquisition of land are covered in Part III of the act. Until the passage of the act, trustees had no right to purchase land with trust money, with two exceptions; first, if the trust instrument authorised or required the trustee to purchase land and second, Section 6(4) of the Trusts of Land and Appointment of Trustees Act 1996, which allowed trustees to buy land either as an investment or for habitation by the beneficiaries.

Under Section 8 of the act, trustees can purchase land "as an investment, for occupation by the beneficiaries or for any other reason". Once this land has been purchased they are free to do with it what they could if they were the absolute owner; they can sell it, lease it or mortgage it. This is a default provision, and can be made irrelevant if the trust instrument contains other rules and requirements. This land may only be bought in Britain; if trustees wish to purchase land outside Britain, they must either invest in companies which own land or alter the trust instrument to allow it.

=== Agents and delegation ===
Part IV of the act covers the delegation of powers to agents, and the trustees liability for their acts. This is an area that has long been criticised by practitioners and academics, particularly the provisions of the Trustee Act 1925. The act allowed the trustees to appoint an agent in good faith, and gave them no liability for the agent's acts. In Re Vickery it was confirmed that a trustee may escape liability for an agent's acts if he acted in good faith, which was simply a test of honesty rather than reasonableness.

Sections 11–20 of the 2000 act cover the appointment of agents. Section 11(1) allows for trustees "[to] authorise any person to exercise any or all of their delegable functions as their agent", with Section 11(2) defining "delegable functions" as any function other than the powers to distribute or dispose of trust assets, allocating fees or other payments, appointing a trustee or further delegating duties. Section 15 requires that, where an administrative function is delegated, special conditions must be satisfied. Section 15(1) makes it mandatory to write and sign a policy agreement, which lays out guidance on how a function should be undertaken.

Sections 21–23 cover the review of agents and the liability of trustees for agents actions. Section 21 identifies that review and liability occurs when the trustees appoints agents, nominees and custodians under the act or under similar provisions in the trust instrument. Section 22 provides a duty on trustees who delegate their powers, with the duty consisting of three elements. Firstly, trustees are required to make sure that agent is suitable for the job he is employed to do. Secondly, they are required to consider whether or not to intervene in the appointment if circumstances demand it. Thirdly, trustees are required to intervene after appointment if the circumstances demand it. Section 23 establishes trustees' liability for the actions of agents; a trustee is liable for negligence if he violates the general duty of care set out in Section 1, but not otherwise.

=== Remuneration ===
Part V of the act, sections 28 to 33, deals with trustees' remuneration. Section 28 states the default position is that trustees are entitled to remuneration if it says so in the trust instrument or if a trustee acts in a "professional capacity". A trust can differ from this default, but the act confirms the recent developments in the common law from the old default position that trustees were entitled to nothing unless it was explicitly stated that they were. Section 29 goes on to say that non-charitable professional trustees are entitled to "reasonable remuneration" which will be a sum that the court thinks is commensurate with the work done, along the principles of quantum meruit. This is automatic if the trustee is a corporation, but will require consent of all other trustees if the trustees are natural persons. Section 30 stipulates that rules on charitable trustee remuneration are to be found in a statutory instrument drawn up by the Secretary of State. Trustees will be reimbursed from the trust fund itself, as will be authorised agents, nominees and custodians who are properly appointed by the trustees all so long as the expenses and payable remuneration are incurred while conducting the affairs of the trust.

=== Repeals ===
The act repealed:

Act	Extent
Trustee Investments Act 1961	Sections 1–3,5,6,8,9,12,13,15 and 16(1), Schedules 1,2 and Paragraph 1(1) of Schedule 4
Charities Act 1993	Sections 70,71, Section 86(2) paragraphs A and B
Duchy of Cornwall Management Act 1893	Entire Act
Settled Land Act 1925	Sections 96, 98(1) and (2), 100
Trustee Act 1925	Part 1, Sections 21,23 and 30
Clergy Pensions Measure 1961	Section 32(2)
House of Commons Members' Fund Act 1962	The words "Subject to the following provisions of this section" in Section 1(2), (3)-(5)
Cereals Marketing Act 1965	Section 18(3)
Agriculture Act 1967	Section 18(3)
Church of England (Pensions) Measure 1988	Section 14(b)
Trusts of Land and Appointment of Trustees Act 1996	Sections 6(4), 9(8), 17(1), Schedule 3, paragraph 3(4)
Cathedrals Measure 1999	Section 16(1)

== See also ==
- English trusts law

== Bibliography ==
- Hudson, Alastair (2009). Equity and Trusts (6th ed.). Routledge-Cavendish. ISBN 978-0-415-49771-8.
- Meakin, Robert (2001). "The Trustee Act 2000: points in practice for charities". Private Client Business. Sweet & Maxwell. ISSN 0967-229X.
- Panesar, Sukhninder (2001). "The Trustee Act 2000". Coventry Law Journal (28). Coventry University.
- Ramjohn, Mohamed (2008). Text, Cases and Materials on Equity and Trusts (4th ed.). Taylor & Francis. ISBN 978-0-415-44294-7.
- Shindler, Geoffrey (2001). "Trustee Act 2000: A Practical Guide on Some Key Features". Elder Law & Finance. 1 (1). Jordan Publishing.
- Wilson, Sarah (2007). Todd & Wilson's Textbook on Trusts (8th ed.). Oxford University Press. ISBN 978-0-19-920326-0.
