= The Tote =

Betting organization

- Industry: Gambling
- Founded: 1928
- Headquarters: Wigan, England
- Key people: John Williamson (Chairman); Alex Frost (Chief Executive Officer)
- Products: Pool betting, sports betting, online casino
- Owner: UK Tote Group
- Website: www.tote.co.uk

The Tote is a British gambling company founded in 1928. It operates the world's largest online pool betting website. Its product offering also includes sports betting and online casino. Business operations are led from its headquarters in Wigan.

The Tote was established and owned by the UK Government until July 2011 when it was sold to Betfred for £265m. It was sold to UK Tote Group – a consortium of over 150 individual investors involved in the sport as racehorse owners and breeders – in October 2019 for £115m. The Tote has retail outlets on 58 of the UK's 59 racecourses, as well as an online division.

Under the ownership of the UK Tote Group, the Tote aims to develop a more competitive product to compete in the UK betting market.

In July 2026, UK Tote Group promoted Paddy Desmond to Chief Operating Officer and hired Eugene Delaney as its B2B Chief Commercial Officer.

== History ==
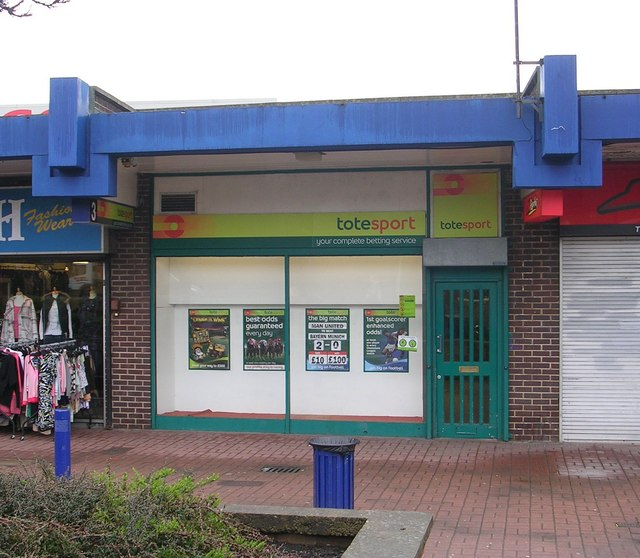
A branch of the Tote in Bramley, Leeds. Later called "Betfred"; now closed

The Racehorse Betting Control Board was created by the Racecourse Betting Act 1928, as a statutory corporation. It was set up by Winston Churchill as a government-appointed board, with the intention of providing a safe, state-controlled alternative to illegal, off-course bookmakers and ensuring that some gambling revenues were put back into the sport of horse racing. The first major race meetings with tote betting were the flat race meetings at Newmarket (July Course) and Carlisle on 2 July 1929.

Under the Betting Levy Act 1961, the board was reconstituted as the Horserace Totalisator Board (the Tote), with responsibility for the redistribution of funds to racing transferred to the Horserace Betting Levy Board.

The Tote opened its first high street betting shop in 1972, and has since grown to employ more than 4,000 staff. Tote Direct was set up in 1992 to channel tote bets from other high street bookmakers into tote pools. Now tote betting is accepted in more than 7,000 betting shops across the UK (the majority of which are non-Tote owned shops) as well as via other online gambling websites.

In 1999, the Tote linked up with Channel 4 Racing to introduce the Scoop6 bet which involves bettors trying to select the winner of six televised races. This bet produced the first horserace betting millionaire. More millionaires followed. A record single-day turnover, in excess of £4 million, was bet into the Scoop6 pool on 22 November 2008.

The Tote has formal pool betting links from similar organisations in Ireland, Germany, France, Holland, Cyprus, Sweden, Denmark, Canada, the US, and South Africa.

The Tote Guarantee was launched in 2020 and means the Tote win price exceeds or matches the industry Start Price. Tote Guarantee was made available to all customers at 55 British racecourses in November 2021.

In 2020, the UK Tote Group agreed a seven-year, strategic alliance with Tote Ireland.

In the same year, the Tote became a founding member of the newly created World Tote Association along with 20 other Tote operators from around the world.

The Tote is also a member of World Pool, and in June 2023 agreed a five-year deal with the Hong Kong Jockey Club to be the exclusive partner for World Pool in UK and Ireland.

=== Privatisation ===
Privatisation was first suggested in 1989 by the then Conservative government, following a study by Lloyds Bank into a possible sell off. However, these plans were met with strong opposition from the racing industry and were later abandoned by the then Home Secretary Michael Howard in 1995.

After the 1997 general election, Howard's Labour successor Jack Straw launched a fresh study, and privatisation of the organisation was made a manifesto commitment in 2001. The Horserace Betting and Olympic Lottery Act 2004 was passed with the intention of converting the Tote from a statutory corporation to a limited company, so that a sale could take place.

The then Chancellor Gordon Brown announced plans for privatisation in the 2006 Budget and the Government invited a racing consortium and Tote staff to formally bid for the Tote by 26 January 2007. This bid was successfully submitted but was rejected by the Department for Culture, Media and Sport as it was backed by private equity.

On 5 March 2008, the Government announced that the Tote would be sold on the open market. However, after an extensive audit, the prevailing financial situation forced the Government to opt to retain the status quo until further notice. On 12 October 2009, Gordon Brown, at that point Prime Minister, announced plans for the sale of the Tote along with a number of other publicly owned assets, although no progress was made before the 2010 general election.

Under the new Coalition government, a competitive bidding process ensued with 18 bidders entering at the first round stage. On 31 January 2011, the government announced that a short-list had been drawn-up for the next round of the process, but declined to confirm which bids were on it. There were believed to be five, including Betfred, David and Simon Reuben, Gala Coral Group, Sports Investment Partners led by Sir Martin Broughton and a foundation set up by the existing management, although there were indications of a sixth. Stan James was suggested as this sixth party, but declined to comment when asked. In May 2011 it was reported that only two bidders remained in the process, Betfred and Sports Investment Partners. On 3 June 2011, it was confirmed that Betfred had been chosen by Culture Secretary Jeremy Hunt as the successful bidder, for a reported figure of £265m. The sale process was completed on 13 July 2011.

=== Key dates ===
- 1928 Racecourse Betting Act passed (August) Racecourse Betting Control Board (the Tote) set up to handle on-course cash pool bets on horse racing
- 1929 First meeting operated under Licence: West Street Harriers (13 March)
- First meeting operated with Board's staff: Old Surrey & Burstow (27 April)
- First major meetings: Newmarket (July Course) and Carlisle (2 July)
- 1930 Tote Investors Ltd set up as an independent company to handle off-course credit tote bets
- 1933 First grants made from Tote profits to Hunters' Improvement Society, promoters of point-to-point meetings and pony racing
- 1956 First sponsored race: Tote Investors Cup (Kempton)
- 1961 Betting Levy Act transferred responsibility for distribution of funds to racing to the Levy Board; Board reconstituted as Horserace Totalisator Board; Tote Investors Ltd opened two betting shops to handle tote pool bets only

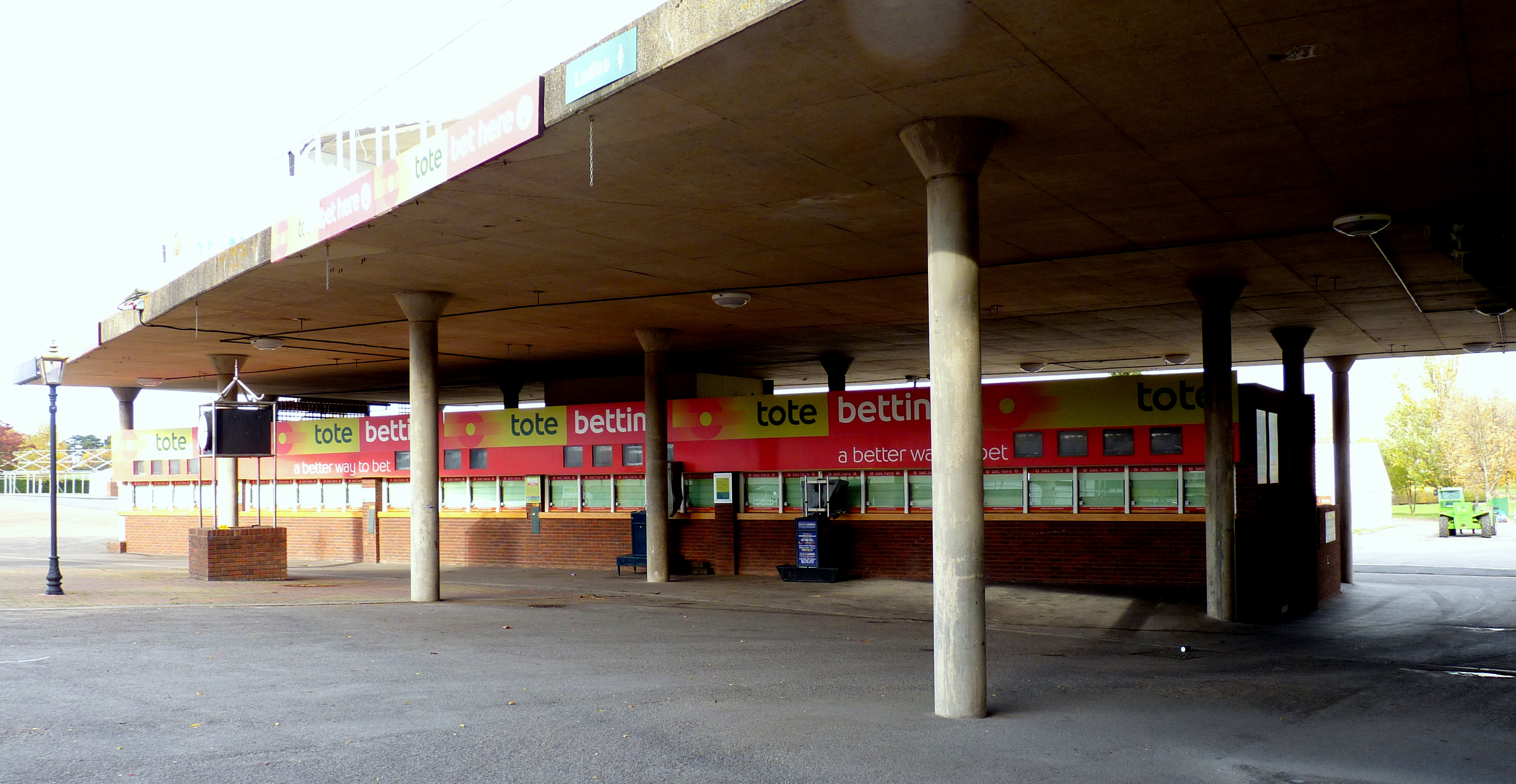
The Tote at Cheltenham racecourse

- 1963 Tote buys Tote Investors Ltd
- 1972 Tote permitted to handle bets on all sports
- 1973 Tote Bookmakers launched
- 1986 Live TV pictures in betting shops
- 1992 Tote Direct launched (joint venture with Corals)
- 1993 Betting shops open in the evening
- 1995 Sunday racing (May: Newmarket and Salisbury)
- 1997 Tote permitted to handle bets on all events, including numbers. Ladbrokes join Tote Direct
- 2002 Tote betXpress internet service launched
- 2004 Official unveiling of totesport/totepool
- 2009 Two year deal to sponsor Hull City A.F.C.
- 2011 Sale of the Tote to Betfred
- 2019 Sale of the Tote to UK Tote Group
- 2019 World Pool is launched at Royal Ascot
- 2020 Seven year alliance between UK Tote Group and Tote Ireland
- 2020 The World Tote Association is formed
- 2022 World Pool days on British and Irish racing grow 44% with turnover of £521 million

=== History of Tote pool bets ===
- 1929 Win and Place pools
- 1930 Daily Double launched (discontinued 1985) Special Autumn Double (Cesarewitch/Cambridgeshire)
- 1931 Ante-post bets on Cambridgeshire and Manchester November Handicap (money was placed in main pools)
- 1933 Straight forecast pool (3 or 4 runner races) (discontinued 1939)
- 1934 Unsuccessful experiment with Single Pools (Win and Place bets in the same pool)
- 1939 Daily Treble (discontinued 1985)
- 1947 : Newbury)
- 1979 Top Three Jockey Pool at Ascot
- 1983 Super Double and Super Treble (Scottish courses only) (discontinued 1983)
- 1991 Trio (discontinued 1998)
- 1994 Quadpot launched (June: Pontefract and Nottingham) and Multibet (May: Goodwood)
- 1998 Trifecta launched (August: Goodwood)
- 1999 Scoop6 launched (July)
- 2000 Exacta launched (January)
- 2008 Swinger and Super7 launched (Super7 Discontinued 2011)
- 2021 New Tote Guarantee available to customers online and on-course
