= Variation of Trusts Act 1958 =

Act of the Parliament of the United Kingdom

Variation of Trusts Act 1958 (Note: Section 3.)
- Act of Parliament
- Parliament of the United Kingdom
- Long title: An Act to extend the jurisdiction of courts of law to vary trusts in the interests of beneficiaries and sanction dealings with trust property
- Citation: 6 & 7 Eliz. 2. c. 53
- Introduced by: Petre Crowder
- Territorial extent: England and Wales (Note: Section 2.)

Dates
- Royal assent: 23 July 1958
- Commencement: 23 July 1958 (Note: The Acts of Parliament (Commencement) Act 1793.)
Other legislation
Amends	County Courts Act 1934
Amended by	Statute Law Revision Act 1948; County Courts Act 1959; Mental Health Act 1959; Northern Ireland Constitution Act 1973; Mental Health Act 1983; Mental Capacity Act 2005
Relates to	Government of Ireland Act 1920; Settled Land Act 1925; Trustee Act 1925; Law of Property Act 1925; Trustee Investments Act 1961

Status: Amended

Text of statute as originally enacted

Revised text of statute as amended

Text of the Variation of Trusts Act 1958 as in force today (including any amendments) within the United Kingdom, from legislation.gov.uk.

The Variation of Trusts Act 1958 (6 & 7 Eliz. 2. c. 53) is an act of the Parliament of the United Kingdom that governs the courts' ability to vary the terms of trust documents. Prior to the 1950s, the courts were willing to approve "compromise" agreements as to what terms meant, not only when they were disputed but also for the benefit of certain parties, such as minors. In 1954, the House of Lords decided in Chapman v Chapman that this would no longer be permitted, creating a gap between the rights of trusts under the Settled Land Act 1925 (which could be altered if there was a flaw) and those trusts that were not (which were affected by the Chapman decision). As a result, following a report by the Law Reform Committee, Petre Crowder introduced the Variation of Trusts Bill to Parliament, where it was given royal assent on 23 July 1958, and came into force as the Variation of Trusts Act 1958.

The act gave the courts near-unlimited discretion to approve "compromise" agreements, for the benefit of infants or other incapable individuals, for individuals who may become beneficiaries, or for unborn beneficiaries. The courts are also able to approve agreements for individuals who may be beneficiaries under protective trusts, with no requirement that the alterations be for their benefit. The courts have interpreted the act's scope fairly widely, stating that almost any "variation" is acceptable, and that "benefit" may mean not just a financial benefit, but also a social or moral one. Despite initial fears that it would allow tax planners another way to hide funds and create a back-and-forth fight between the Chancery Division and Parliament, the act was met with general approval. The ability of the courts to alter trustees' investment powers under the act was criticised as slow and expensive, and as a result this is now covered by the Trustee Investments Act 1961.

== Background ==
Prior to the 1950s, the courts commonly accepted that they could approve a "compromise" agreement where there was a dispute over the precise meaning of words in a trust document. In some cases, the courts used this to rearrange trusts for the benefit of certain parties (such as minors) where there was no real dispute. In 1954 however, the House of Lords decided in Chapman v Chapman [1954] AC 429 that this power was reserved for a genuine dispute. This decision caused frustration: where previously all trusts could be varied, either through the court's ability to create a "compromise" agreement or the rights granted to trusts which came under the Settled Land Act 1925, Chapman limited this right to those created under the 1925 Act. In January 1957 the Lord Chancellor asked the Law Reform Committee "to consider whether any alteration is desirable in the powers of the court to sanction a variation in the trusts of a settlement in the interests of beneficiaries under disability and unborn persons, with particular reference to the decision in Chapman v. Chapman", and a report was presented to Parliament in November of that year. A draft bill was drawn up and introduced by Petre Crowder, the Member of Parliament for Ruislip-Northwood; it received its second reading in the House of Lords on 12 June 1958, and was given royal assent on 23 July 1958.

== Act ==
The act gives the courts almost unlimited power to exercise their jurisdiction to form "compromise" agreements, with Section 1(1) allowing them to approve "any arrangement...varying or revoking all or any of the trusts or enlarging the powers of the trustees of managing or administering any of the property subject to the trusts". This power can be exercised for people in one of four categories: beneficiaries who are incapable of assenting to the change (infants or those who are otherwise incapable); individuals who may "be entitled" to be beneficiaries in the future, but who are not at present; unborn beneficiaries; or people who may be beneficiaries under protective trusts. The first three classes may only have a "compromise" agreement if the alterations are for their benefit, while potential beneficiaries under protective trusts have no such limit. The courts have chosen to interpret "benefit" widely, increasing their powers to alter trusts; in Re Holt's Settlement [1968] 1 All ER 470, Megarry J said that "the word benefit is... plainly not confined to financial benefit, but may extend to social or moral benefit". Under section 1(3), the act does not apply to trusts created by an act of Parliament. The wide scope of the act was quantified in Re Steed's Will Trusts, where the Court of Appeal ruled that the word "arrangement" was "deliberately used in the widest possible senses so as to cover any proposal which any person may put forward for varying or revoking the trusts", essentially allowing the courts the right to make any alteration whatsoever. Despite this, the Court of Appeal noted in Re T's Settlement Trusts [1964] Ch 158 that the court would not permit a compromise agreement where it not only varied the terms of the trust but constituted the creation of an entirely new one.

There is the question as to what to do with proposed "compromise" agreements where it is not certain that a benefit will ensue. In this situation, the courts have sometimes agreed to take the chance, as in Re Holt's Settlement; on other occasions, as in Re Cohen's Settlement Trusts [1965] 3 All ER 139, they have found that if the claimant, a member of a class of beneficiaries, applies and cannot benefit (although other members of the class can), the court is obliged to refuse the request. It is debatable as to whether the intentions of the testator should be taken into account; in Re Steed's Will Trusts [1960] 1 All ER the courts refused to alter a trust document, partially due to the testator's wishes; in Re Remnant's Settlement Trusts [1970] 2 All ER 554, however, the court took the opposite view.

While some critics feared that granting the courts unlimited jurisdiction would create "a most undignified game of chess between the Chancery Division and the legislature", and that it allowed tax planners another way to hide funds, the act received general approval at the time. It was later criticised as expensive and slow in regards to allowing trustees the right to alter their investment powers, and this part of the act was later superseded by the Trustee Investments Act 1961. The second class of beneficiaries covered in Section 1(1) caused problems for the courts; since it only allows the court to alter a trust document where a person "may be entitled", nothing can be done once this entitlement is confirmed.

== Bibliography ==
- Edwards, Richard; Nigel Stockwell (2007). Trusts and Equity (8th ed.). Pearson Longman. ISBN 978-1-4058-4684-4.
- Hudson, Alastair (2009). Equity and Trusts (6th ed.). Routledge-Cavendish. ISBN 0-415-49771-X.
- Price, Leolin (1959). "Variation of Trusts Act, 1958". Modern Law Review. 22 (1). Blackwell Publishing.
- Price, Leolin (1961). "Trustee Investments Act, 1961". Modern Law Review. 24 (6). Blackwell Publishing.
