= Harries v Church Comrs for England =

1992 trust case in English Law

Harries v Church Commissioners for England
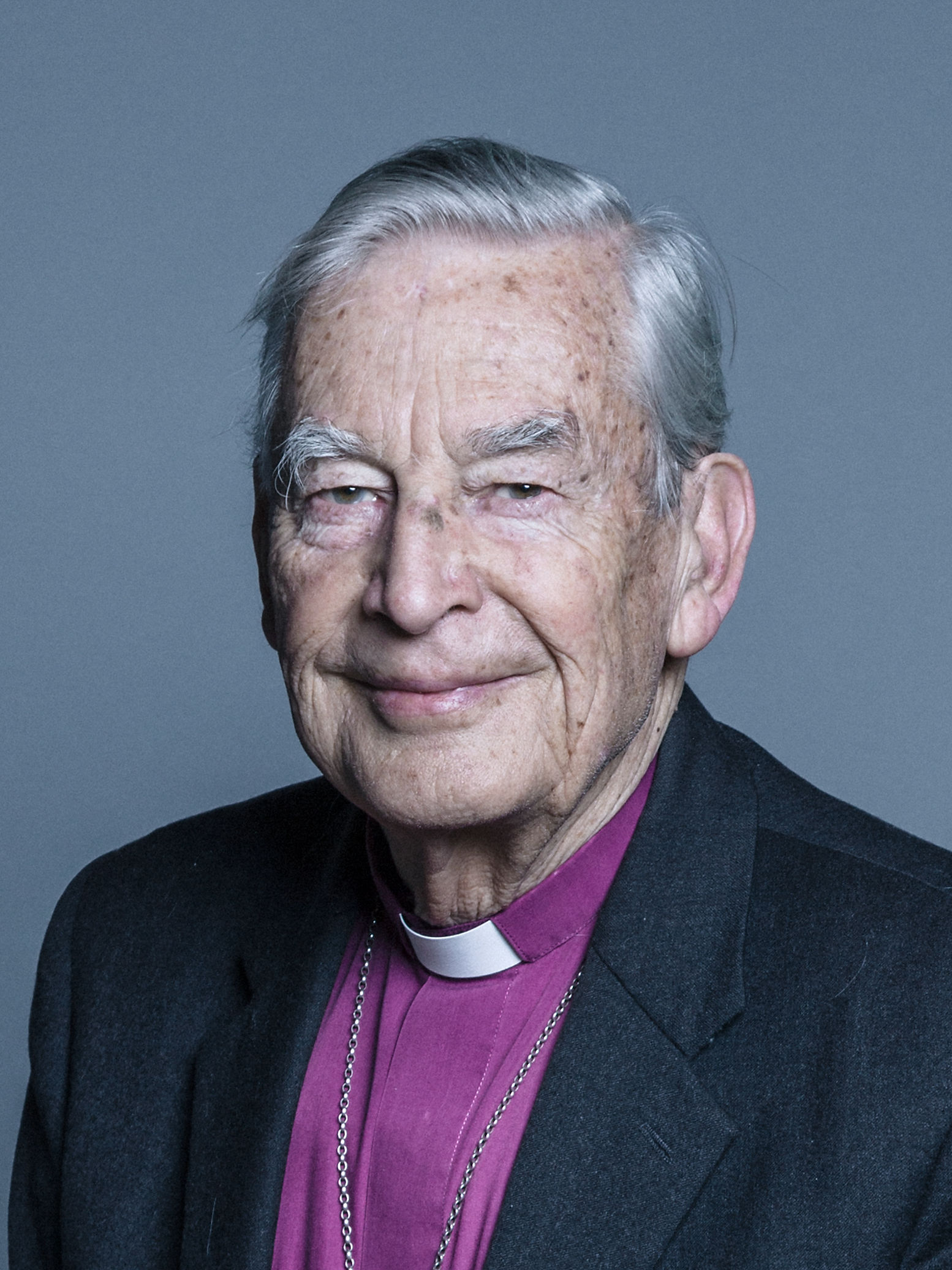
- Court: High Court
- Decided: 25 October 1991
- Citation: [1992] 1 WLR 1241, [1993] 2 All ER 300

Keywords
- Duty of care, ethical investment

Harries v The Church Commissioners for England [1992] 1 WLR 1241 is an English trusts law case, concerning the possibility to invest ethically. It tempers the decision in Cowan v Scargill to show that trustees can make investments, guided by ethical considerations, if it can be shown that overall financial performance would not be harmed, but also if it would be consistent with the purpose of the trust.

== Facts ==
Richard Harries, Bishop of Oxford, challenged the Commissioners to change their investment policy. 85% of the fund provided income for stipends for serving clergy, pensions for retired clergy and housing for both. Harries argued that investments should not be selected that were incompatible with ‘the promotion of the Christian faith through the Church of England’ even if it involved financial detriment. The Commissioners argued their policy was fine, of regarding non-financial considerations so far as it did not ‘significantly jeopardise or interfere with accepted investment principles’. The Commissioners already excluded 13% of companies under its existing investment policy, and evidence showed that a more restrictive policy of not investing in South Africa meant not investing in a further 24% of listed companies (to reach 37% in total).

== Judgment ==
Sir Donald Nicholls, V.-C. held that the Commissioners policy was sound. He went on to say that one can invest ethically if otherwise there would be a conflict with the trust’s objects.

I should mention one other particular situation. There will be instances today when those who support or benefit from a charity take widely different views on a particular type of investment, some saying that on moral grounds it conflicts with the aims of the charity, others saying the opposite. One example is the holding of arms industry shares by a religious charity. There is a real difficulty here. To many questions raising moral issues there are no certain answers. On moral questions widely differing views are held by well-meaning, responsible people. This is not always so. But frequently, when questions of the morality of conduct are being canvassed, there is no identifiable yardstick which can be applied to a set of facts so as to yield one answer which can be seen to be “right” and the other “wrong.” If that situation confronts trustees of a charity, the law does not require them to find an answer to the unanswerable. Trustees may, if they wish, accommodate the views of those who consider that on moral grounds a particular investment would be in conflict with the objects of the charity, so long as the trustees are satisfied that course would not involve a risk of significant financial detriment. But when they are not so satisfied trustees should not make investment decisions on the basis of preferring one view of whether on moral grounds in investment conflicts with the objects of the charity over another. This is so even when one view is more widely supported than the other. I have sought above to consider charity trustees' duties in relation to investment as a matter of basic principle. I was referred to no authority bearing directly on these matters. My attention was drawn to Cowan v Scargill [1985] Ch 270, a case concerning a pension fund. I believe the views I have set out accord with those expressed by Sir Robert Megarry V.-C. in that case, bearing in mind that he was considering trusts for the provision of financial benefits for individuals. In this case I am concerned with trusts of charities, whose purposes are multifarious.

== See also ==
- Buttle v Saunders [1950] 2 All ER 193
- Cowan v Scargill [1985] Ch 270
- Liverpool and District Hospital for Diseases of the Heart v Attorney General [1981] 1 All ER 994
