= Buttle v Saunders =

- Court: High Court
- Citation: [1950] 2 All ER 193

Keywords
- Fiduciary duty, gazumping

Buttle v Saunders [1950] 2 All ER 193 is an English trusts law case, which held that a trustee has a duty to gazump, or break an agreement which has not quite been completed into a formal and binding contract.

== Facts ==
The defendant trustee agreed to sell Mrs Simpson some land for £6,142. A beneficiary of the trust then offered £6,500 for the same land. The trustee refused, since he had already come to an informal agreement with Mrs Simpson. The beneficiary applied for an injunction against the sale to Mrs Simpson, alleging the duty was to obtain the highest price.

== Judgment ==
Wynn-Parry J granted the injunction saying,

The only consideration which was present to their minds was that they had gone so far in the negotiations with Mrs Simpson that they could not properly, from the point of view of commercial morality, resile from those negotiations.

== See also ==
- Cowan v Scargill
