= Principles for Responsible Investment =

Responsible investment framework

Principles for Responsible Investment (UNPRI or PRI) is a voluntary framework supported by the United Nations for an international network of financial institutions working together to implement six aspirational principles, often referenced as "the Principles", guiding them to incorporate environmental, social, and governance (ESG) factors into investment analysis, decision-making, ownership practices, and to report on their progress. The PRI states that its goal is to contribute to the development of a more sustainable global financial system.

The program began in April 2006 at the New York Stock Exchange, when UN Secretary-General Kofi Annan launched it. The initiative emerged from talks in 2005 with a group of investors and experts, aiming to align investment activities with economic, social, and environmental goals.

As of March 2025, the PRI had more than 5,000 signatories representing almost US$140 trillion in assets, according to PRI data. Since 2018, the PRI has set minimum requirements and can remove members who fail to meet them.

== Overview ==
=== About ===
In early 2005, the then UN Secretary-General, Kofi Annan, invited a group of the world's largest institutional investors to join a process to develop the Principles for Responsible Investment. A 20-person investor group drawn from institutions in 12 countries was supported by a 70-person group of experts from the investment industry, intergovernmental organisations and civil society. The Principles were launched in April 2006 at the New York Stock Exchange.

The Principles were incubated by the UNEP Finance Initiative and the UN Global Compact and were developed and launched by a joint Secretariat from both organizations including: James Gifford, Paul Clements Hunt, Georg Kell, Jacob Malthouse, Gordon Hagart, Philip Walker and Gavin Power.

The Principles are based on the notion that environmental, social and governance (ESG) issues, such as climate change and human rights, can affect the performance of investment portfolios and should therefore be considered alongside more traditional financial factors if investors are to properly fulfill their fiduciary duty. The six Principles provide a global framework for mainstream investors to consider these ESG issues.

The PRI was created alongside the Principles to help put the framework into practice.

The Principles saw increased sign-up following the 2008 financial crisis, according to a report in the Financial Times.

The Principles are 'voluntary and aspirational' and they do not have minimum entry requirements or absolute performance standards for responsible investment. However, signatories have an obligation to report on the extent to which they implement the Principles through the annual Reporting and Assessment process.

The PRI has around 200 staff based mostly in London, with offices in New York City, Seoul, São Paulo, Amsterdam, Tokyo and Cape Town.

=== Principles for Responsible Investment ===
The six principles are as follows:

As institutional investors, we have a duty to act in the best long-term interests of our beneficiaries. In this fiduciary role, we believe that environmental, social, and corporate governance (ESG) issues can affect the performance of investment portfolios (to varying degrees across companies, sectors, regions, asset classes and through time). We also recognise that applying these principles may better align investors with broader objectives of society. Therefore, where consistent with our fiduciary responsibilities, we commit to the following:

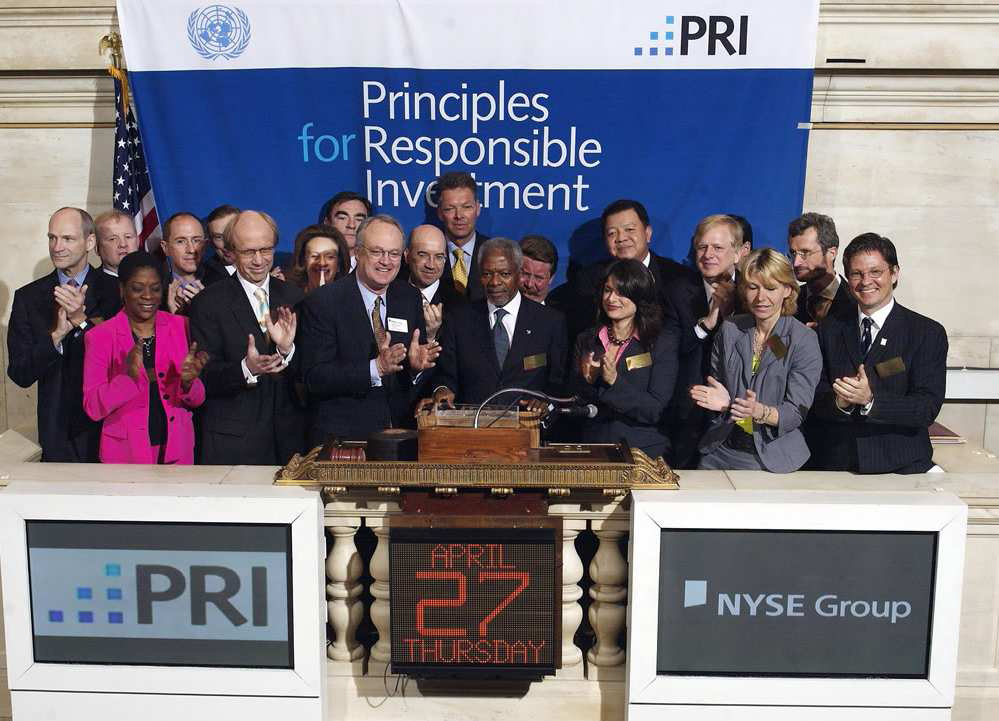
Unveiling of the PRI at the New York Stock Exchange in 2006, attended by founding PRI signatories and the former UN Secretary General Kofi Annan

1. We will incorporate ESG issues into investment analysis and decision-making processes.
2. We will be active owners and incorporate ESG issues into our ownership policies and practices.
3. We will seek appropriate disclosure on ESG issues by the entities in which we invest.
4. We will promote acceptance and implementation of the Principles within the investment industry.
5. We will work together to enhance our effectiveness in implementing the Principles.
6. We will each report on our activities and progress towards implementing the Principles.

== Accountability and minimum requirements ==
In 2018, the PRI told its members that they would need to meet a set of minimum requirements in order to remain members. Members must have a responsible investment policy covering at least half of their assets, someone in the organisation must be responsible for applying it, and senior management must oversee it. Those who did not meet the requirements were given two years to do so before being removed.

At the start of the process, 165 members were warned that they did not meet the requirements, and most of them improved. In 2020, the PRI removed five signatories: four asset managers and one asset owner. These were the first signatories removed for failing to meet the minimum requirements.

=== Partnership initiatives ===
The PRI is a founding member of the United Nations Sustainable Stock Exchanges (SSE) initiative along with the United Nations Conference on Trade and Development (UNCTAD), the United Nations Environment Programme Finance Initiative (UNEP-FI), and the UN Global Compact.

=== PRI Academy ===
In 2014, PRI launched the PRI Academy with the aim of equipping industry professionals with a common language of ESG, based on the latest thinking in responsible investment. The Academy's mission is to support industry-wide fluency in ESG and address the well-recognised industry skills-gap in responsible investment, given the significant obstacles these issues present to successful ESG incorporation.

As of 2026, the PRI Academy has trained over 30,000 individuals from 88 countries.

== Major projects ==
=== Fiduciary duty in the 21st century ===
A report published by the PRI (with UNEP FI, UNEP Inquiry and the UN Global Compact) found that fiduciary duty is not an obstacle to asset owner action on ESG factors. Fiduciary duty in the 21st century looked at fiduciary duty across eight markets (US, Canada, UK, Germany, Brazil, Australia, Japan and South Africa) through a series of events, interviews, case studies and a legal review.

Fiduciary duty has long been a contentious issue, especially in the US. Asset managers and advisers have often cited fiduciary duty as a reason for not incorporating ESG factors into the investment decision-making process, claiming that looking at non-financial indicators was not consistent with their fiduciary duty.

The report found that many investors have yet to fully integrate ESG issues into their investment decision making processes. Some of the reasons for this include outdated perceptions about fiduciary duty and long-term responsible investment.

=== ESG integration for equity investing ===
The PRI launched a guide to help investors – both asset owners and investment managers – who are implementing ESG integration techniques in their investment process. It is the most comprehensive description to date of what ESG-integrated analysis is, and how it works in practice.

The guide contains information and case studies on integration techniques that apply to investment strategies including fundamental, quantitative, smart beta and passive investment. It assists asset owners and investment managers with constructing ESG-integrated investment processes and helps asset owners to assess their managers' integration practices. A chapter on sell-side investment research maps out the types of ESG-integrated research available, and demonstrates brokers' integration techniques.

== See also ==
- UK company law and US corporate law
- Corporate social responsibility
- Institutional investor and Stewardship Code
- Sustainable Asset Management (SAM)
