= Trustee Investments Act 1961 =

Act of the Parliament of the United Kingdom

Trustee Investments Act 1961 (Note: Section 17(1).)
- Act of Parliament
- Parliament of the United Kingdom
- Long title: An Act to make fresh provision with respect to investment by trustees and persons having the investment powers of trustees, and by local authorities, and for purposes connected therewith.
- Citation: 9 & 10 Eliz. 2. c. 62
- Territorial extent: England and Wales; Scotland; Isle of Man; Channel Islands; (Note: Section 17(2)–(5).)

Dates
- Royal assent: 3 August 1961
- Commencement: 3 August 1961 (Note: The Acts of Parliament (Commencement) Act 1793.)
Other legislation
Amends	Trusts (Scotland) Act 1921; Ghana Independence Act 1957; Federation of Malaya Independence Act 1957; Agricultural Marketing Act 1958
Amended by	Building Societies Act 1962; Water Resources Act 1963; London Government Act 1963; National Loans Act 1968; Trustee Savings Banks Act 1969; National Savings Bank Act 1971; Statute Law (Repeals) Act 1974; Statute Law (Repeals) Act 1981; Housing (Consequential Provisions) Act 1985; Building Societies Act 1986; Trustee Act 2000; Abolition of Feudal Tenure etc. (Scotland) Act 2000; Charities and Trustee Investment (Scotland) Act 2005

Status: Partially repealed

Text of statute as originally enacted

Revised text of statute as amended

Text of the Trustee Investments Act 1961 as in force today (including any amendments) within the United Kingdom, from legislation.gov.uk.

The Trustee Investments Act 1961 (9 & 10 Eliz. 2. c. 62) is an act of the Parliament of the United Kingdom that covers where trustees can invest trust funds. Given royal assent on 3 August 1961, it removed the "Statutory Lists" system and replaced it with sets of specific investment areas. The act was heavily criticised for the way it set these areas out, particularly the requirement that trusts trying to invest in multiple areas would need to be permanently divided. A 1997 Law Commission paper called its terms "overly cautious and restrictive", suggesting that some trusts were underperforming as a result. The passing of the Trustee Act 2000 effectively nullified the 1961 act's terms in relation to trustee investment, and the 2000 act is now the principal piece of legislation in this area.

== Background ==
Prior to the 1961 act, the areas trustees could invest in were based on the Trustee Act 1925, which set up a "Statutory Lists" system. The list contained only those investments available at the Post Office, along with land. It did not take into account the deprecation of currency or inflation, meaning that if the trustees invested in stocks and shares they were at risk of losing money simply because of the falling value of the pound sterling. As a result, even though the income from a trust might remain nominally constant, the real value of that income could be much reduced over the lifetime of the trust. This was recognised by lawyers, who had been advising their clients to structure trusts in such a way as to allow their trustees to invest in wider areas than the Statutory Lists. In 1952 the report of the Nathan Committee advocated reform, and the government published a white paper on "Government Policy on Charitable Trusts in England and Wales" in 1955, which proposed a reform of the Statutory Lists system. This came about under the Variation of Trusts Act 1958, which allowed trustees to apply to the courts to widen their investment powers, a process that was expensive and slow.

A statement in the House of Lords on 13 May 1959 promised further reform, and a detailed White Paper was published in December. In November 1960 a Bill based on that report was introduced in the House of Lords, where it was much scrutinised by solicitors and barristers (particularly at the Committee stage) owing to its complexity. The Bill received its royal assent on 3 August 1961, and passed into law as the Trustee Investments Act 1961.

== Act ==
The act replaced the old Statutory Lists system of investments with two sets of "narrow range" investments and a set of "wide range" investments, both covered in the first Schedule of the Act. The first set of "narrow range" investments included Defence Bonds, National Savings Certificates and similar "small" investments, which could be bought at a Post Office and did not require the trustee to seek advice before investing. The second set included debentures in certain British companies and gilt-edged securities, with the trustee expected to seek written advice from a person he believed was qualified to give it before investing. "Wide range" investments included unit trusts and shares in certain British companies, and shares in building societies.

If trustees wished to invest in "wide range" investments, they were required to have the trust fund valued and divided into two parts – three quarters of the value in one part, and a quarter in the other. The quarter was to be invested in "wide range" investments, while the remainder was restricted to "narrow range" investments. The valuation had to be done by "a person reasonably believed by the trustee to be qualified to make it". This division of funds was permanent, and the quarter and three quarters became distinct units. The permanence of the division was the act's most controversial section.

== Aftermath ==
The act was considered a bad one, since it required a "very conservative investment policy for trustees". The powers given to investment trustees were restrictive and narrow, and the trustees were expected to go through expensive and complicated procedures to exercise them. The act was criticised almost immediately for its complexity and outdatedness. A 1997 paper by the Law Commission called it "overly cautious and restrictive", and suggested that some trusts were underperforming because of the difficulty of complying with the act's provisions. The Trustee Act 2000 repealed most of the 1961 act and now serves as the principal piece of guidance on trustee investments.

== Subsequent developments ==
Section 16(2) of, and schedule 5 to, the act were repealed by section 1 of, and part XI of the schedule to, the Statute Law (Repeals) Act 1974, which came into force on 27 June 1974.

== Bibliography ==
- Edwards, Richard; Nigel Stockwell (2007). Trusts and Equity (8th ed.). Pearson Longman. ISBN 978-1-4058-4684-4.
- Hudson, Alastair (2009). Equity and Trusts (6th ed.). Routledge-Cavendish. ISBN 0-415-49771-X.
- Price, Leolin (1961). "Trustee Investments Act, 1961". Modern Law Review. 24 (6). Blackwell Publishing. ISSN 0026-7961.
- Ramjohn, Mohamed (1998). Sourcebook on trusts law (2nd ed.). Routledge. ISBN 1-85941-186-X.
- Wilson, Sarah (2007). Todd & Wilson's Textbook on Trusts (8th ed.). Oxford University Press. ISBN 0-19-920326-1.
