= Pension Law Reform =

Government issued inquiry

Pension Law Reform (1993) Cm 2342, also known as the Goode Report after its leading author, Roy Goode, was a UK government commissioned inquiry into the state of pensions in the United Kingdom, which ultimately led to a set of statutory reforms in the Pensions Act 1995.

== Background ==
In the 1970s, a government white paper recommended that members be given more control over running their pension scheme money, particularly by electing at least half the seats on pension trust boards. In the 1980s and 1990s a series of scandals and corporate collapses led to losses to occupational pension funds, and brought public pressure for changes to pension regulation. In particular, Robert Maxwell, the proprietor of the Mirror News Group had suddenly died and it was then revealed that he had been stealing millions of pounds from his employees' pension schemes.

== Contents ==
The Goode Report recommended legislation for the participation of scheme members in pensions. Trusts were a sound legal vehicle for ‘protecting the pension promise’. In trust documents, employers write the scheme to themselves and nominate all trustees, even in defined contribution schemes where members bear all risks, and this was unsatisfactory since:

members earn their benefits by their work and their contributions. It is their scheme in a very real sense and they have a legitimate interest in its management. ...

But however scrupulous the employer may be, there is no substitute for the discipline of another voice in the decision-making process, who can ensure that the employer-appointed trustees do not allow themselves, consciously or unconsciously, to be unduly influenced by the wishes and concerns of the employer.

== Significance ==
In the Pensions Act 1995 sections 16 to 21, the Conservative government required that employees and beneficiaries had the right to elect representatives to trust boards, unless the employer opted out. In the Pensions Act 2004 the opt out was removed so that one-third of pension trusts or corporations were elected, and the minister could raise this to one-half.

== See also ==
- UK company law
- UK labour law
