= United Nations Environment Programme Finance Initiative =

Sustainable development partnership since 1992

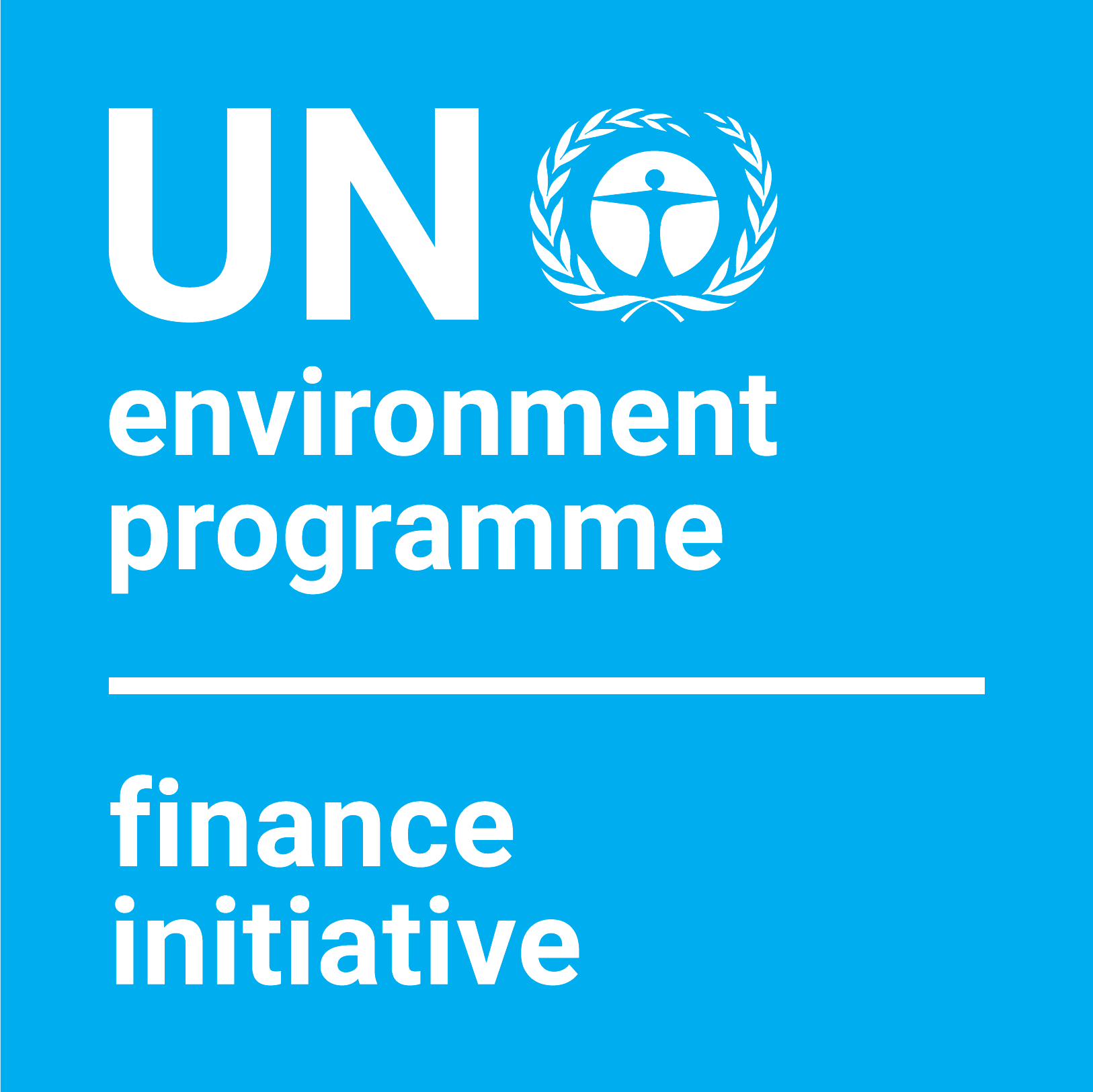
- Abbreviation: UNEP FI
- Formation: 1992
- Type: Programme
- Legal status: Active
- Headquarters: Geneva, Switzerland
- Head: Eric Usher (2015-present)
- Website: www.unepfi.org

The United Nations Environment Programme Finance Initiative (UNEP FI) is a partnership between the United Nations Environment Program (UNEP) and the global financial sector to catalyse action across the financial system to align economies with sustainable development. As the UN partner for the finance sector, they convene financial institutions on a voluntary basis to work together with them, and each other, to find practical solutions to overcome the many sustainability challenges facing the world today. UNEP FI does this by providing practical guidance and tools which support institutions in the finance sector to find ways to reshape their businesses and commit to targets for limiting greenhouse gas emissions, protecting nature, promoting a circular economy and supporting financial inclusion to address inequality. The solutions developed effectively form a blueprint for others in the finance sector to tackle similar challenges and evolve their businesses along a sustainable pathway. The creation and adoption of such a blueprint also informs policy makers concerned with sustainability issues about what would constitute appropriate regulation for the finance sector at large. Founded in 1992, UNEP FI was the first organisation to pioneer engagement with the finance sector around sustainability. The Finance Initiative was responsible for incubating the Principles for Responsible Investment and for the development and implementation of UNEP FI's Principles for Responsible Banking and Principles for Sustainable Insurance as well as the UN-convened net-zero alliances. Today, UNEP FI provides sustainability leadership to more than 400 financial institutions, with assets of well over $80 trillion headquartered around the world.

== History ==
Founded in 1972 following the landmark UN Conference on the Human Environment, the United Nations Environment Programme (UNEP) was conceived to monitor the state of the environment, inform policy-making with science, and coordinate responses to the world's environmental challenges. Over the years, UNEP has worked closely with industry in developing environmental management strategies. It started working with forward-looking organisations in the financial services sector at the beginning of the 1990s, convinced that the financial sector had a valuable contribution to make in protecting the environment while maintaining the health and profitability of their businesses.

=== Launch of the UNEP Finance Initiative ===
In May 1992, in the run-up to the Earth Summit in Rio de Janeiro that year, a small group of banks, including Deutsche Bank, HSBC Holdings, Natwest, Royal Bank of Canada, and Westpac developed the UNEP Statement by Banks on the Environment and Sustainable Development, and the Banking Initiative was formed. This Initiative, which operated under the auspices of UNEP, engaged a broad range of financial institutions, including commercial banks, investment banks, venture capitalists, asset managers, and multi-lateral development banks and agencies which promoted the integration of environmental considerations into all aspects of the financial sector's operations and services. In 1995, UNEP joined forces with a group of leading insurance and reinsurance companies, including General Accident, Gerling Global Re, National Provident, Storebrand, Sumitomo Marine & Fire, Swiss Re, as well as pension funds, to launch the UNEP Statement of Environmental Commitment by the Insurance Industry. In this voluntary commitment, signatory companies pledged to achieve a balance of economic development, the welfare of people and a sound environment.

=== Building the initiative ===
From 1999 the two groups of banks and insurers began to work together on issues of mutual interest, and in 2003, the two groups merged to form the UNEP Finance Initiative. Then, in 2012, UNEP FI and a group of insurance companies took the first steps in anchoring sustainability at the heart of their business strategies when they developed the Principles for Sustainable Insurance, the first global framework for the insurance industry to address environmental, social, and governance risks and opportunities. The development of the Principles led to the largest collaborative initiative between the UN and the insurance industry—the PSI Initiative. Over 200 organisations worldwide have adopted the four Principles for Sustainable Insurance, including insurers representing more than 25% of world premium volume and USD 14 trillion in assets under management.

In 2019, a coalition of 132 banks convened by UNEP FI developed the first global sustainability framework for the banking industry when they launched the Principles for Responsible Banking. The six guiding principles help signatory banks ensure their strategy and practice align with the vision society has set out for its future in the Sustainable Development Goals and the Paris Climate Agreement and bring purpose, vision and ambition to sustainable finance. Signatories commit to embedding the principles across all business areas, at the strategic, portfolio and transactional levels. With the development of principles for the insurance and banking industry in addition to the Principles for Responsible Investment, sustainability blueprints now exist for all sectors of the finance industry.

To fast-track financial institutions' action on decarbonising the global economy, UNEP FI has convened coalitions of actors from across the financial sector – investors, banks, and re/insurers. 2019 saw the launch of the UN-convened Net-Zero Asset Owner Alliance in partnership with the PRI; in April 2021 UNEP FI launched the Net-Zero Banking Alliance, and the Net-Zero Insurance Alliance was born in July 2021. The member-led alliances unite financial institutions that have committed to achieving net-zero GHG emissions in their portfolios by 2050, in line with the Paris Agreement; the members collaborate in working groups to jointly develop tools and guidance.

By 2023, the membership of these alliances had expanded to 86 institutions, collectively managing over USD 9.5 trillion. They achieved a reduction in financed GHG emissions to 213.4 million tons. Additionally, 69 members defined new intermediate climate targets, while 67 set ambitious sub-portfolio targets aiming for significant CO2e reductions between 22–32% by 2025 and 40–60% by 2030. The alliances also directed substantial investments totaling USD 380.6 billion towards climate solutions, particularly in the building and energy sectors.

After the reelection of Donald Trump, most major Wall Street banks backed out of the Net-Zero Banking Alliance after the administration threatened banks with net zero policies. Major banks from Canada, the UK, Switzerland, Australia, and Japan soon followed, with most saying they would continue to follow internal emissions targets. The group declared that it had formally ceased operations on October 3, 2025.

=== PRI ===
For many years, UNEP FI's membership comprised investors and asset managers who worked with UNEP FI on influential initiatives such as the Property Working Group, as well as publishing landmark reports including the "Freshfields Report" regarded as the first major step in mainstreaming responsible investment.

To accelerate leadership in responsible investment and better serve the investment community and the financial industry at large, in 2021, UNEP FI and its sister organisation the Principles for Responsible Investment established a joint initiative, the Investment Leadership Programme (ILP), and merged UNEP FI's investment membership with PRI's. The platform brings together small groups of leading responsible investors to work on initiatives that are considered to be leading best practices. Investors continue to have access to ILP leadership projects and initiatives through their membership in the PRI. Through this collaborative programme, leading investors continue to engage with UNEP FI's network of banks and insurers and continue to work with others to catalyse change across the entire finance industry.

To further mobilise the financial community to support a sustainable, resilient and inclusive economy and ensure that sustainability is considered at the highest level of corporations, in 2021, UNEP FI formed the Leadership Council. The body comprises CEOs and Chairpersons of banks and insurers currently represented on one of the three elected UNEP FI governance bodies; the Global Steering Committee, the Board of the Principles for Responsible Banking or the Board of the Principles for Sustainable Insurance. Chaired by the Executive Director of the UN Environment Programme, the UNEP FI Leadership Council meets annually to provide vision and strategic direction to UNEP FI in orienting its role and that of the UN, in shaping, mainstreaming and deepening sustainability integration across the industry.

== Mission statement ==
UNEP FI's mission is to "help create a financial sector that serves people and planet while delivering positive impacts" and to "inspire, inform and enable financial institutions to improve people's quality of life without compromising that of future generations".

To do so, the Initiative works with members from the banking and insurance industries, technical experts and key stakeholders to convene collective action, facilitate shared learning and co-develop practical resources to equip financial institutions with the knowledge and expertise to make their strategies and operations more sustainable.

The Initiative facilitates collaborative projects to develop methodologies and tools, encourage harmonization, promote advances in good practice, and support leadership to accelerate growth in the quantity and quality of sustainable financial institutions. UNEP FI aims to create an effective network for sharing knowledge and to amplify the collective voice of the finance sector in policy debate, engaging policymakers, regulators and supervisors on the role of the financial sector in contributing to sustainable development.

== Organisation ==
UNEP FI is a Unit within the United Nations Environment Programme's Resources and Markets Branch, itself a Branch of one of the UNEP's eight core divisions, the Industry and Economy Division. UNEP FI's daily activities are run by a Secretariat based in Geneva, Switzerland, led by Eric Usher since 2015.

UNEP FI's main governance bodies are the Annual General Meeting, the Initiative's ultimate decision-making forum, the Global Steering Committee overseeing the strategic orientation of the overall Initiative, the three Industry Committees (Banking, Insurance and Investment), the Thematic Advisory Groups and the Regional Advisory Groups.

== Global and Regional Roundtables ==
UNEP FI holds regular agenda-setting Global and Regional Roundtables to bring together partners and other stakeholders to build momentum to advance sustainable finance market practice and provide clear signals from the financial sector to policymakers on the importance of integrating Environmental, Social and Governance (ESG) issues and sustainability impacts into financial decision-making. The first Global Roundtable (GRT) took place in 1994 in Geneva, Switzerland. Global Roundtables have since then crossed the world taking place every two years in a different part of the world and since 2020 virtually as well.

Regional roundtables take place every other year, providing an opportunity for members and actors in the sustainable finance community to come together locally to discuss the latest trends and innovations and share good practices.

== Notable contributions ==
UNEP FI has been responsible for authoring or editing a number of seminal publications, among which are:

- A Legal Framework for the Integration of Environmental, Social and Governance Issues into Institutional Investment (also known as the 'Freshfields Report, 2005)
- Demystifying Responsible Investment Performance: A review of key academic and broker research on ESG factors (2007)
- Fiduciary Responsibility: Legal and practical aspects of integrating environmental, social and governance issues into institutional investment (2009)
- The Global state of Sustainable Insurance: Understanding and integrating environmental, social and governance factors in insurance (2009)
- The Materiality of Climate Change: How Finance Copes with the Ticking Clock (2009)
- Why environmental externalities matter to institutional investors (2011)
- Guide to Banking and Sustainability (2011) (2016)
- Principles for Sustainable Insurance (2012)
- Sustainability Metrics (2014)
- Principles for Positive Impact Finance (2017)
- ENCORE tool (2018)
- Underwriting environmental, social and governance risks in non-life insurance business (2018)
- Principles for Responsible Banking (2019)
- Fiduciary Duty in the 21st century (2019)
- Financing circularity (2020)
- Testing the application of the EU taxonomy to core banking products (2021)
- Insuring the climate transition: Enhancing the insurance industry's assessment of climate change futures (2021)
- The Climate Risk Landscape: Mapping Climate-related Financial Risk Assessment Methodologies
- Turning the Tide: How to Finance a Sustainable Ocean Recovery (2021)
- Guidelines for Climate Target Setting for Banks (2021)
- A Legal Framework for Impact: sustainability impact in investor decision-making (2021)
- Recommendations for Credible Net-Zero Commitments from Financial Institutions (2021)
